= Larry Leichliter =

American animator and director

- Born: Lawrence Leichliter; United States
- Education: University of California, Berkeley; University of California, Los Angeles
- Years active: 1975–present

Lawrence Leichliter is an American animator and television director. He began his work in animation in 1975 with the made-for-television Peanuts special You're a Good Sport, Charlie Brown. Throughout his career, he has worked on Peanuts animated television films, but he has also contributed to other animated series including Nickelodeon's ChalkZone and The Mighty B!, as well as Cartoon Network's Time Squad, Squirrel Boy, The Marvelous Misadventures of Flapjack, Sym-Bionic Titan, and Adventure Time.

== Career ==
Leichliter's career in animation began in 1975 when he worked on You're a Good Sport, Charlie Brown. This was followed by numerous other Peanuts specials that he was a crew member of throughout the late 1970s and 1980s. Since then, he has worked on many animated television series, particularly those made for Nickelodeon, which include Hey Arnold!, ChalkZone, SpongeBob SquarePants, CatDog, The Fairly OddParents, The Mighty B!, and Catscratch. Leichliter more recently was a director for the Cartoon Network original series Adventure Time, for which he directed 114 episodes and the original short. Adventure Time also garnered him three Primetime Emmy Award nominations in the category "Outstanding Short-Format Animated Program" in 2010, 2011, and 2012. He is currently directing Bee and PuppyCat for Cartoon Hangover. In 2015, he received a Primetime Emmy Award for his work as animation director on Over the Garden Wall.

== Filmography ==
Year	Work	Role	Notes
1975	You're a Good Sport, Charlie Brown	Assistant animator	TV short
1976	It's Arbor Day, Charlie Brown	Assistant animator	TV short
1977	Race for Your Life, Charlie Brown	Animator	Theatrical movie
1977	It's Your First Kiss, Charlie Brown	Animator	TV short
1978	What a Nightmare, Charlie Brown!	Assistant animator	TV short
1979	You're the Greatest, Charlie Brown	Animator	TV short
1980	She's a Good Skate, Charlie Brown	Assistant animator	TV short
1980	Bon Voyage, Charlie Brown (and Don't Come Back!!)	Animator	Theatrical movie
1980	Life Is a Circus, Charlie Brown	Assistant animator	TV short
1981	It's Magic, Charlie Brown	Assistant animator	TV short
1981	Someday You'll Find Her, Charlie Brown	Animator	TV short
1981	No Man's Valley	Animator	TV short
1982	A Charlie Brown Celebration	Animator	TV movie
1982	Hey Good Lookin'	Assistant animator	Theatrical movie
1982	Here Comes Garfield	Animator	TV short
1983	Is This Goodbye, Charlie Brown?	Animator	TV short
1983	It's an Adventure, Charlie Brown	Animator	TV movie
1983	What Have We Learned, Charlie Brown?	Animator	TV short
1983	Garfield on the Town	Animator	TV short
1983–85	The Charlie Brown and Snoopy Show	Animator	TV series; 10 episodes
1984	It's Flashbeagle, Charlie Brown	Animator	TV short
1985	Snoopy's Getting Married, Charlie Brown	Animator	TV short
1985	The Romance of Betty Boop	Animator	TV movie
1985	You're a Good Man, Charlie Brown	Animator	TV short
1986	Happy New Year, Charlie Brown!	Animator	TV short
1986	It's Three Strikes, Charlie Brown	Animator	TV short
1987	Cathy	Animator	TV movie
1988	Snoopy: The Musical	Animator	TV movie
1988	It's the Girl in the Red Truck, Charlie Brown	Graphic blandishment	TV movie
1988	Cathy's Last Resort	Animator	TV movie
1988–89	This Is America, Charlie Brown	Animator	TV mini-series; 7 episodes
1989	Cathy's Valentine	Animator	TV movie
1990	Why, Charlie Brown, Why?	Animator	TV short
1991	Snoopy's Reunion	Animator	TV short
1991	Rock-a-Doodle	Character clean-up artist	Theatrical movie
1992	It's Christmastime Again, Charlie Brown	Graphic blandishment	TV short
1992	Frosty Returns	Animator	TV short
1992	It's Spring Training, Charlie Brown	Animator	TV short
1994	You're in the Super Bowl, Charlie Brown	Supervisor: Taiwan	TV short
1994	A Troll in Central Park	Character clean-up artist	Theatrical movie
1994	Garfield and Friends	Animator (archive footage)	TV series; 1 episode
1994–95	Spider-Man	Animation director	TV series; 3 episodes
1995	Aladdin	Character designer	TV series; 1 episode
1996–98	Hey Arnold!	Director; animation director; supervising director; sheet timer	TV series; 10 episodes
1998	CatDog	Director	TV series; 1 episode
1999–2007	SpongeBob SquarePants	Animation director; sheet timer	TV series; 7 episodes
2001	The Fairly OddParents	Director	TV series; 4 episodes
2001	Time Squad	Director; retake supervisor; timing director	TV series; 2 episodes
2002	A Charlie Brown Valentine	Animation supervisor	TV short
2002	ChalkZone	Supervising director; supervising producer	TV series; 1 episode
2002	Charlie Brown's Christmas Tales	Director	TV short
2002	Jeffrey Cat: Claw and Order	Director; animation timer	TV short/pilot
2002	Baby Looney Tunes	Animation Timing Director	TV series; 5 episodes
2003	Lucy Must Be Traded, Charlie Brown	Director	TV short
2003	I Want a Dog for Christmas, Charlie Brown	Director	TV short
2004	Party Wagon	Animatic, animation supervisor	TV movie
2005–06	Catscratch	Sheet timer; timing director	TV series; 4 episodes
2006	Danger Rangers	Sheet timing	TV series; 1 episode
2006	He's a Bully, Charlie Brown	Director; animation supervisor	TV movie
2007	Squirrel Boy	Sheet timer	TV series; 1 episode
2007–08	Random! Cartoons	Director; sheet timer; lip assignment	TV series; 6 episodes
2008	Ni Hao, Kai-Lan	Sheet timing	TV series; 1 episode
2008–09	The Mighty B!	Director; supervising timing director; sheet timer	TV series; 40 episodes
2009–10	The Marvelous Misadventures of Flapjack	Sheet timer	TV series; 19 episodes
2009	Regular Show - "The Pilot"	Animation director	Web short
2010–12	Adventure Time	Director; supervising director	TV series; 114 episodes
2010–11	Sym-Bionic Titan	Animation director; sheet timer	TV series; 11 episodes
2011	Secret Mountain Fort Awesome	Animation director	TV series; 1 episode
2011	Thank You	Collaborating director	Short
2012–13	Gravity Falls	Timing director	TV series; 11 episodes
2013–16	Bee and PuppyCat	Director	YouTube series;
2013–15	Sofia the First	Co-director	TV series
2016–19	The Loud House	Sheet timer	TV series
