= Sam Jaimes =

American animator

Sam Jaimes is an American animator from Hanna-Barbera and Mendelson-Melendez Productions, who got his start with Walt Disney Productions after serving in the US Navy. He animated for the Peanuts cartoon specials and movies. He directed seven Peanuts specials in the 1980s.

== Films ==
- Sleeping Beauty (1959) – inbetweener
- The Man Called Flintstone (1966) – assistant animator
- A Boy Named Charlie Brown (1969) – animator
- Snoopy Come Home (1972) – graphic blandishment
- Race for Your Life, Charlie Brown (1977) – animator
- The Lord of the Rings (1978) – animator
- Bon Voyage, Charlie Brown (and Don't Come Back!!) (1980) – animator

== Television specials ==
- Alice in Wonderland or What's a Nice Kid Like You Doing in a Place Like This? (1966) – assistant animator
- It Was a Short Summer, Charlie Brown (1969) – graphic blandishment
- Play It Again, Charlie Brown (1971) – graphic blandishment
- Babar Comes to America (1971) – graphic blandishment
- You're Not Elected, Charlie Brown (1972) – graphic blandishment
- There's No Time for Love, Charlie Brown (1973) – graphic blandishment
- A Charlie Brown Thanksgiving (1973) – graphic blandishment
- It's a Mystery, Charlie Brown (1974) – graphic blandishment
- It's the Easter Beagle, Charlie Brown (1974) – animator
- Yes, Virginia, There Is a Santa Claus (1974) – animator
- Be My Valentine, Charlie Brown (1975) – animator
- You're a Good Sport, Charlie Brown (1975) – animator
- It's Arbor Day, Charlie Brown (1976) – animator
- A Flintstone Christmas (1977) – animator
- It's Your First Kiss, Charlie Brown (1977) – animator
- What a Nightmare, Charlie Brown! (1978) – animator
- You're the Greatest, Charlie Brown (1979) – animator
- She's a Good Skate, Charlie Brown (1980) – animator
- Life Is a Circus, Charlie Brown (1980) – animator
- It's Magic, Charlie Brown (1981) – animator
- No Man's Valley (1981) – animator
- Someday You'll Find Her, Charlie Brown (1981) – animator
- A Charlie Brown Celebration (1981) – animator
- Here Comes Garfield (1982) – animator
- It's an Adventure, Charlie Brown (1983) – sequence director/animator
- Garfield on the Town (1983) – animator
- It's Flashbeagle, Charlie Brown (1984) – director
- It's Your 20th Television Anniversary, Charlie Brown (1985) – director of animation
- You're a Good Man, Charlie Brown (1985) – director
- Molly and the Skywalkerz: Happily Ever After (1985) – animator
- Happy New Year, Charlie Brown! (1985) – director
- Snoopy: The Musical (1988) – director/animator
- It's the Girl in the Red Truck, Charlie Brown (1988) – graphic blandishment
- Why, Charlie Brown, Why? (1990) – director/animator
- Snoopy's Reunion (1991) – director
- It's Spring Training, Charlie Brown (1992) – director/animator
- Frosty Returns (1992) – animator
- You're in the Super Bowl, Charlie Brown (1993) – graphic blandishment
- It Was My Best Birthday Ever, Charlie Brown (1997) – graphic blandishment
- Jasper: The Story of a Mule (2005) – character designer

== Television series ==
- Frankenstein, Jr. and the Impossibles (1966) – animator
- Moby Dick and the Mighty Mightor (1967) – animator
- The New Adventures of Huckleberry Finn (1968) – animator
- The Adventures of Gulliver (1968) – animator
- The Charlie Brown and Snoopy Show (1983–1985) – director/segment director (9 episodes)
- This Is America, Charlie Brown (1990–1989) – director (3 episodes)
- Garfield and Friends (1988–1994) – animator (1 episode – 1994)
