= Flashbeagle =

Soundtrack album by various artists
- Released: April 1984
- Genre: Children's music; soundtrack; pop
- Length: 23:16
- Label: Charlie Brown Records
- Producer: Lee Mendelson; Desirée Goyette; Ed Bogas; Jymn Magon

Singles from Flashbeagle
- 1. "Flashbeagle" Released: 1984

Flashbeagle is a soundtrack album associated with the animated television special It's Flashbeagle, Charlie Brown first broadcast on CBS on April 16, 1984. It was released in April 1984 by Charlie Brown Records (distributed by Disneyland Records).

The album features ten songs written by Desirée Goyette and Ed Bogas. It was nominated for Best Recording for Children at the 27th Annual Grammy Awards.

== Background ==
Flashbeagle first appeared in Charles M. Schulz's Peanuts comic strip on November 29, 1983, prior to the television special and album. The November 29, 1983 strip shows Snoopy wearing a headband and thinking, "Flashbeagle!" It's Flashbeagle, Charlie Brown parodies Flashdance and Staying Alive through musical sequences featuring a hoedown, aerobics, "Lucy Says", and Snoopy dancing at a nightclub.

== Composition and musical themes ==
Several tracks on Flashbeagle correspond to musical sequences or character segments from the television special, including "Flashbeagle", "Pigpen Hoedown", "Peppermint Patty's P.E. Program (I'm in Shape)", "Lucy Says", and "Snoopy's Big Debut". The album differs from earlier Peanuts soundtrack albums associated with Vince Guaraldi, using vocal songs and early-1980s pop and dance idioms rather than jazz-based instrumental scoring. The title song is tied to Snoopy's Flashbeagle persona, while "Peppermint Patty's P.E. Program (I'm in Shape)" reflects the special's aerobics sequence and "Pigpen Hoedown" corresponds to its country-dance setting. Additional songs were featured in other Peanuts television material, including The Charlie Brown and Snoopy Show and It's Your 20th Television Anniversary, Charlie Brown.

== Release ==
Flashbeagle was released in April 1984, on vinyl and cassette formats. A promotional 7-inch single containing "Flashbeagle" and "Snoopy" was also issued.

== Awards ==
The album was nominated for Best Recording for Children at the 27th Annual Grammy Awards. The nomination was also listed in UPI coverage of the Grammy nominees in January 1985.

== Track listing ==
All tracks are written by Desirée Goyette and Ed Bogas.

Side one
No.	Title	Lead vocal	Length
1.	"Flashbeagle"	Desirée Goyette; Joey Scarbury	4:07
2.	"Pigpen Hoedown"		1:31
3.	"Don't Give Up, Charlie Brown^{[a]}"		2:07
4.	"Peppermint Patty's P.E. Program (I'm in Shape)"	Gini Holtzman	1:46
5.	"Snoopy"	Desirée Goyette; Joey Scarbury	2:36

Side two
No.	Title	Lead vocal	Length
6.	"Someday, Charlie Brown^{[a]}"	Desirée Goyette	2:40
7.	"Let's Have a Party^{[b]}"	Desirée Goyette	2:14
8.	"Lucy Says"	Jessie Lee Smith	2:16
9.	"Woodstock^{[a]}"	Desirée Goyette	1:42
10.	"Snoopy's Big Debut ^{[a]}"	Robert Towers	2:17
Total length:			23:16

Notes

- ^{^[a]} From It's Your 20th Television Anniversary, Charlie Brown
- ^{^[b]} Theme from The Charlie Brown and Snoopy Show; this version was later used for the second season in 1985

== Personnel ==
Credits adapted from original vinyl release.

- Desirée Goyette – words, music, lead vocals on tracks 1, 5, 6, 7, and 9
- Ed Bogas – words, music, composer, arranger, producer
- Joey Scarbury – co-lead vocals on tracks 1 and 5
- Bill Meyers – horn arrangements on tracks 5, 7, 8, and 10
- George Thomas Charouhas – engineer
- Lee Mendelson – producer
- Jymn Magon – producer
- Charles M. Schulz – illustration
- United Feature Syndicate – phonographic copyright holder

== See also ==
- Lee Mendelson Film Productions
- Peanuts filmography
- Melendez Films
