= Snoopy! The Musical (TV special) =

1988 animated television musical of children's movies

- Genre: Animated musical adaptation
- Based on: Peanuts by Charles M. Schulz; Snoopy! The Musical by; Warren Lockhart; Arthur Whitelaw; Michael Grace
- Written by: Charles M. Schulz
- Directed by: Sam Jaimes
- Voices of: Sean Collins; Ami Foster; Jeremy Miller; Tiffany Billings; Cam Clarke; Kristie Baker; Bill Melendez
- Music by: Larry Grossman
- Country of origin: United States
- Original language: English

Production
- Executive producer: Charles M. Schulz
- Producers: Bill Melendez; Lee Mendelson
- Running time: 48 minutes
- Production companies: Lee Mendelson Film Productions; Bill Melendez Productions

Original release
- Network: CBS
- Release: January 29, 1988

Related
- Happy New Year, Charlie Brown! (1986); It's the Girl in the Red Truck, Charlie Brown (1988)

Snoopy! The Musical is the 31st prime-time animated TV special based on characters from the Charles M. Schulz comic strip Peanuts. It is an animated adaptation of the musical of the same name, and originally aired on the CBS network on January 29, 1988.

This is one of the two musicals in the Peanuts franchise where Snoopy has a speaking voice which only viewers can hear; the other is 1985's You're a Good Man, Charlie Brown.

== Plot ==
A series of vignettes are strung together regarding the Peanuts gang. Each vignette has a song that involves various members of the gang (Consisting of Charlie Brown, Lucy, Linus, Sally, Peppermint Patty, Woodstock, and Snoopy)

- "Don't Be Anything Less Than Everything You Can Be" – Charlie Brown, Peppermint Patty, Sally and Linus sing about being the best that you can be, as Snoopy observes.
- "Snoopy's Song" – Snoopy decides to obey his owner more after Lucy almost convinces Charlie to trade him in for a cat.
- "Woodstock's Theme" – a short musical interlude plays as Woodstock wakes up, flies, and falls down with Snoopy commenting on his technique.
- "Edgar Allan Poe" – Peppermint Patty, Lucy, Sally, Linus, Charlie Brown agonize over the teacher calling on them, figuring that no matter what, the teacher will ask them something having to do with Edgar Allan Poe.
- "I Know Now" – Sally, Peppermint Patty and Lucy sing about what they have learned as they have grown up.
- "The Vigil" – Linus once again holds vigil in the pumpkin patch on Halloween night, in hopes that the Great Pumpkin will appear. Snoopy accompanies him, but wears dark glasses so as to prevent anyone from recognizing him.
- "Clouds" – The Peanuts gang lay about in a grassy meadow, talking about what they see in the clouds.
- "The Great Writer" – Snoopy attempts to compose his written masterpiece: "It Was a Dark and Stormy Night".
- "Poor Sweet Baby" – Peppermint Patty and Charlie Brown discuss understanding what love is.
- "The Big Bow-Wow" – Snoopy is selected as Head Beagle, and celebrates by going out on the town, and performing at a stage show.
- "Just One Person" – The Peanuts gang sing an ensemble piece about believing in yourself.

== Cast ==
- Tiffany Billings as Lucy van Pelt
- Kristi Baker as Peppermint Patty
- Cam Clarke as Snoopy (when talking and singing)
- Sean Collins as Charlie Brown
- Ami Foster as Sally Brown
- Jeremy Miller as Linus van Pelt
- Bill Melendez as Snoopy (when making his dog sounds) and Woodstock (uncredited)

== Production ==
In 1967, Having adapted the musical You're a Good Man, Charlie Brown three years prior, Charles Schulz once again opted to adapt the other musical with the Peanuts gang. Schulz had recently utilized many comic strips for The Charlie Brown and Snoopy Show. Snoopy!!! The Musical marked the first time Snoopy was voiced by Cameron Clarke: Clarke would go on to voice Snoopy in This Is America, Charlie Brown and in the World of Snoopy storybooks.

The song "Poor Sweet Baby" was based on the comic strip on April 8, 1973, and the Broadway version song "Hurry up Face" was based on the comic strip on September 17, 1972.

The idea of Lucy mistaking a potato chip for a butterfly was borrowed from 1969's It Was a Short Summer, Charlie Brown.

Stock footage was used for several sequences:

- Kids leaving school in "Just One Person" is from You're Not Elected Charlie Brown and Be My Valentine, Charlie Brown
- Charlie Brown kissing The Little Red-Haired Girl, flying and landing in his bed is from It's Your First Kiss, Charlie Brown
- Peppermint Patty and Charlie Brown talking under the tree in "Poor Sweet Baby" is from There's No Time for Love, Charlie Brown and It's Arbor Day, Charlie Brown

=== Cameos ===
- Rerun makes a brief cameo in the song "I Know Now" after Linus upsets him and is confronted by their parents.
- The Cat Next Door appears on screen for the first time, resembling Brutus from the 1977 film Race For Your Life, Charlie Brown.
- The Little Red-Haired Girl, again in the "Heather" version, appears comforting Charlie Brown in the "Poor, Sweet Baby" segment.

== Release ==
=== Home media ===
While the special has been released on VHS, it has not seen an official DVD or Blu-ray release in the United States. However, it was released on DVD in the United Kingdom by distributor Firefly Entertainment. It is also one of the few Peanuts specials not to be re-released on Apple TV.
