= It's Flashbeagle, Charlie Brown =

1984 television special

- Genre: Animation television special
- Created by: Charles M. Schulz
- Written by: Charles M. Schulz
- Directed by: Bill Melendez; Sam Jaimes
- Voices of: Brett Johnson; Brad Kesten; Stacy Ferguson; Jeremy Schoenberg; Heather Stoneman; Gini Holtzman; Keri Houlihan; Bill Melendez
- Opening theme: Flashbeagle
- Ending theme: Flashbeagle
- Composers: Ed Bogas; Desirée Goyette
- Country of origin: United States
- Original language: English

Production
- Producers: Lee Mendelson; Bill Melendez
- Editors: Chuck McCann; Roger Donley; Richard Allen
- Running time: 24 minutes
- Production companies: Lee Mendelson Film Productions; Bill Melendez Productions; Charles M. Schulz Creative Associates; United Media Productions

Original release
- Network: CBS
- Release: April 16, 1984

Related
- What Have We Learned, Charlie Brown? (1983); Snoopy's Getting Married, Charlie Brown (1985)

It's Flashbeagle, Charlie Brown is the 27th prime-time animated musical television special based upon the comic strip Peanuts by Charles M. Schulz. It originally aired on CBS on April 16, 1984.

== Background ==
The special is presented as an original musical which features parodies of the early-1980s breakdancing craze, MTV, the films Saturday Night Fever, Flashdance and Footloose, and a number of popular top 40 hit songs of the early 1980s. The program consists of a series vignettes rather than a strong unifying plot.

== Plot ==
After Snoopy defeats Peppermint Patty at football, he celebrates with a dance party ("Flashbeagle").

At school, Peppermint Patty leads her gym class in a workout ("Peppermint Patty's PE Program (I'm in Shape)")

Charlie Brown and Sally host a party, where everyone begins a game of "Simon Says" until Lucy takes charge from 5 ("Lucy Says"). Afterwards, the kids dance to a song about Pig-Pen ("Pigpen Hoedown").

The next morning, Snoopy is sleeping when Charlie Brown berates him for oversleeping while others work.

Later that day, Snoopy decides on an outfit for a night on the town and heads to a discothèque with Franklin, where his dance moves are met with acclaim from the other club-goers ("Flashbeagle (1st Reprise)"). When he heads home exhausted from his performance, Charlie Brown takes notice and can't believe what his dog has done and become.

The next morning, Sally takes a groggy Snoopy to school for Show and Tell. After 5 talks about his pet chameleon, Sally's turn comes, but Snoopy is still exhausted. However, 5 berates Snoopy for just sitting there asleep. He changes all of that by turning on his boom box, causing Snoopy to awaken and dance, and the children gradually join in ("Flashbeagle (2nd Reprise)").

Charlie Brown tells Sally that he plans to lecture Snoopy on his behavior. Sally disagrees because, thanks to Snoopy, she got an "A" for the first time for Show and Tell.

== Voice cast ==
- Brett Johnson as Charlie Brown and 555 95472
  - Brad Kesten as Charlie Brown's speaking voice within songs
  - Kevin Brando as Charlie Brown's singing voice
- Stacy Ferguson as Sally Brown
- Jeremy Schoenberg as Linus van Pelt
  - David T. Wagner as Linus' singing voice
- Heather Stoneman as Lucy van Pelt
  - Jessie Lee Smith as Lucy's singing voice
- Gary Goren as Schroeder/Tommy, the kid
- Gini Holtzman as Peppermint Patty
- Keri Houlihan as Marcie
- Bill Melendez as Snoopy/Woodstock

Frieda Rich, Franklin and Pig-Pen appear but are silent.

== Production ==
After seeing Flashdance, Schulz decided to draw a parody-tribute to what he saw with Snoopy performing as the "flashdancer", sporting the same dance outfit worn by Jennifer Beals; in a November 29, 1983, comic strip that later led to the idea of turning it into an animated TV special.

Bill Melendez explained that the dancing Snoopy in the club scene was done by rotoscoping where the character is drawn over live-action pictures. Flashdance stunt dancer Marine Jahan was chosen to perform routines to provide Snoopy's moves. The animators rotoscoped pictures of Jahan to Snoopy.

Schulz's 12 year old daughter Jill was said to have inspired the "She's in Shape" sequence when Schulz drew images.

The special's cast would go on to provide the voices on the second season of The Charlie Brown and Snoopy Show, save for Gary Golen, who would be replaced by Danny Colby.

== Soundtrack ==
A soundtrack was issued on Disneyland Records under the "Charlie Brown Records" banner (like the earlier "Read-Along" records Disney issued for Peanuts) featuring songs from this special. Half of the other songs later appeared on the 1985 documentary It's Your 20th Television Anniversary, Charlie Brown. Songs were written by Ed Bogas and Desirée Goyette; Goyette sings on the album, alongside Joey Scarbury of "Believe It or Not" fame. The album was produced by Bogas, Goyette, Lee Mendelson and Jymn Magon. Bill Meyers, best known for his work on Earth, Wind & Fire's hit "Let's Groove", did the horn arrangements on some of the songs.

== Home media ==
The special was released on VHS in 1988 by Hi-Tops Video, again on March 9, 1994, on The Snoopy Double Feature V. 2 along with "He's Your Dog, Charlie Brown" from Paramount Home Video, and on DVD by Warner Home Video as a bonus feature to Snoopy's Reunion on April 7, 2009. In 2017, it was released on 4K Blu-ray as a part of the Peanuts Holiday Collection. On October 7, 2025, it was released on the DVD and Blu-Ray collection Peanuts: 75th Anniversary Ultimate TV Specials Collection along with 39 other Peanuts specials.

== Critical reception ==
Mick Martin and Marsha Porter of the Video Movie Guide disliked the special as they compared it to 1983's R-rated movie Flashdance and blamed Charles M. Schulz for his approval of it. They gave it one out of five stars while considering it as "the series' lowest point".

== Bibliography ==
- Celebrating Peanuts: 60 Years - Google Books
