= It's Your 20th Television Anniversary, Charlie Brown =

1985 documentary television special

- Genre: Documentary
- Created by: Charles M. Schulz
- Presented by: Charles Schulz
- Voices of: Brad Kesten (Charlie Brown); Bill Melendez (Snoopy)
- Theme music composer: Vince Guaraldi
- Opening theme: "Let's Have a Party"
- Ending theme: "Someday, Charlie Brown"
- Composers: Desiree Goyette; Ed Bogas

Production
- Executive producer: Lee Mendelson
- Producer: Bill Melendez
- Running time: 60 min.
- Production companies: Lee Mendelson Film Productions; Bill Melendez Productions; United Media Productions

Original release
- Network: CBS
- Release: May 14, 1985

Related
- Snoopy's Getting Married, Charlie Brown (1985); You're a Good Man, Charlie Brown (1985)

It's Your 20th Television Anniversary, Charlie Brown is an animated documentary television special based on characters from the Peanuts comic strip. Hosted by Peanuts creator Charles M. Schulz, the television special originally aired on the CBS network on May 14, 1985. The special featured highlights of the Peanuts specials produced over the last twenty years.

== Voice cast ==
- Brett Johnson as Charlie Brown
- Bill Melendez:as Snoopy

== Cast ==
- Peter Robbins (Charlie Brown, 1963–69)
- Pamelyn Ferdin (Lucy Van Pelt, 1969–71)
- Stacy Ferguson (Sally Brown, 1984–85)
- Gini Holtzman (Peppermint Patty, 1984–85)
- Keri Houlihan (Marcie, 1984–85)
- Chris Inglis (Charlie Brown, 1971)
- Desirée Goyette
- Marine Jahan
- Chuck McCann
- Lee Mendelson
- Joey Scarbury
- Charles M. Schulz
- Jill Schulz
