= Lee Mendelson Film Productions =

American media production company

- Industry: Film production, television production, animation, music publishing
- Founded: April 10, 1964; 62 years ago
- Founder: Lee Mendelson
- Headquarters: Burlingame, California, United States
- Key people: Lynda Mendelson; Glenn Mendelson; Jason Mendelson; Sean Mendelson
- Products: Peanuts television specials, soundtrack albums; Garfield television specials
- Website: mendelsonproductions.com

Lee Mendelson Film Productions (LMFP) is an American production company based in Burlingame, California. Founded by Lee Mendelson in 1963, the company is best known for producing animated television specials and feature films based on Charles M. Schulz's Peanuts comic strip, including A Charlie Brown Christmas (1965), It's the Great Pumpkin, Charlie Brown (1966), and A Boy Named Charlie Brown (1969).

In addition to its work on Peanuts, the company has produced Garfield television specials and series, documentaries, live-action specials, music-related programming, and other television productions. Its work has been recognized by major entertainment and broadcasting organizations, including the Emmy Awards, Peabody Awards, Academy Awards, and Grammy Awards, with much of that recognition connected to children's television, animation, and music-related recordings.

== Background ==
A scene from A Charlie Brown Christmas (1965), which established Lee Mendelson Film Productions' long-running association with the Peanuts franchise.

Lee Mendelson began his television career producing documentary and public affairs programming in the San Francisco Bay Area. His early work included San Francisco Pageant, a KPIX-TV documentary series that received a Peabody Award in 1962.

Mendelson's association with the Peanuts franchise began in 1963 when he approached Charles M. Schulz about producing a documentary on the comic strip entitled A Boy Named Charlie Brown. That project led to a collaboration with animator Bill Melendez and ultimately to A Charlie Brown Christmas (1965), which received both a Peabody and Emmy Award. The success of the special launched a decades-long partnership with Schulz and Melendez spanning television specials, feature films, and music recordings.

In the 1980s, the company expanded into the Garfield franchise, producing a series of television specials and series that earned several Emmy Awards and nominations.

=== Copyright enforcement litigation ===
In May 2026, the company received national media attention after filing four copyright infringement lawsuits over alleged unauthorized uses of music associated with the Peanuts franchise, including compositions by Vince Guaraldi. The lawsuits targeted a variety of defendants, including the United States Department of the Interior, video game publisher GameMill Entertainment, and operators of social media accounts for Heritage Auctions and Buckle-Down, Inc., that had allegedly incorporated Peanuts music into online content. The complaints alleged that the Interior Department used Guaraldi's arrangement of "O Tannenbaum" in social media posts and a digital holiday card; that Heritage Auctions used "Linus and Lucy" in social media posts promoting collectibles auctions; that Buckle-Down used copyrighted Peanuts music in social media posts promoting its merchandise; and that music created for GameMill Entertainment's 2025 video game Snoopy and the Great Mystery Club was substantially similar to Guaraldi's compositions "Linus and Lucy" and "Skating," despite neither composition having been licensed.

The lawsuits received widespread media coverage and highlighted the company's continuing efforts to protect intellectual property associated with the Peanuts television specials and their music catalog.

=== Stephen Colbert licensing dispute ===
The copyright enforcement campaign became the subject of a comedic segment during the final episode of The Late Show with Stephen Colbert, in which host Stephen Colbert joked that house band Louis Cato and the Great Big Joy Machine would perform "Linus and Lucy" without first obtaining a license. Colbert remarked that the performance might "cost CBS money" because the music had not been cleared for broadcast. LMFP later reached a licensing agreement with CBS for the use of the composition, with the payment amount undisclosed. LMFP chairman Jason Mendelson said the company found the segment "funny and entertaining", while emphasizing the need to secure licenses for commercial uses of copyrighted music. Proceeds from the agreement were donated by LMFP to World Central Kitchen.

The agreement involved companies with a long shared history through the Peanuts franchise, as CBS had originally broadcast most Peanuts television specials produced by LMFP between 1965 and 2000.

== Awards and recognition ==
LMFP has received awards and nominations from several major awards organizations, mainly for its television productions. The company's Peabody Award-winning programs include San Francisco Pageant, A Charlie Brown Christmas, Hot Dog (1970), and What Have We Learned, Charlie Brown? (1983).

The company also received Emmy recognition for animated and children's programming, including Peanuts productions, Garfield specials, and retrospective programs. Its Emmy-recognized productions include Life Is a Circus, Charlie Brown, Garfield on the Town, Garfield in the Rough, Garfield's Halloween Adventure, Cathy, Garfield's Babes and Bullets, Here's to You, Charlie Brown: 50 Great Years, and It's Your 50th Christmas, Charlie Brown!.

The company's theatrical work includes a 1970 Academy Award nomination for A Boy Named Charlie Brown for Best Original Song Score, losing to The Beatles' Let It Be. Its music-related recognition includes Grammy Award nominations for Flashbeagle (1984) and a book-and-record adaption of You're in Love, Charlie Brown (1979), both in children's recording categories.

== Filmography ==
=== Feature films ===
Release date	Title	Distributor
December 4, 1969	A Boy Named Charlie Brown	Cinema Center Films
August 9, 1972	Snoopy Come Home	Cinema Center Films
August 24, 1977	Race for Your Life, Charlie Brown	Paramount Pictures
May 30, 1980	Bon Voyage, Charlie Brown (and Don't Come Back!!)	Paramount Pictures

== Television ==
=== Animated specials ===
==== Peanuts ====
Airdate	Title	Network	Notes
December 9, 1965	A Charlie Brown Christmas	CBS	
June 8, 1966	Charlie Brown's All Stars!	CBS	
October 27, 1966	It's the Great Pumpkin, Charlie Brown	CBS	
June 12, 1967	You're in Love, Charlie Brown	CBS	
February 14, 1968	He's Your Dog, Charlie Brown	CBS	
September 27, 1969	It Was a Short Summer, Charlie Brown	CBS	
March 28, 1971	Play It Again, Charlie Brown	CBS	
October 29, 1972	You're Not Elected, Charlie Brown	CBS	
March 11, 1973	There's No Time for Love, Charlie Brown	CBS	
November 20, 1973	A Charlie Brown Thanksgiving	CBS	
February 1, 1974	It's a Mystery, Charlie Brown	CBS	
April 9, 1974	It's the Easter Beagle, Charlie Brown	CBS	
January 28, 1975	Be My Valentine, Charlie Brown	CBS	
October 28, 1975	You're a Good Sport, Charlie Brown	CBS	
March 16, 1976	It's Arbor Day, Charlie Brown	CBS	Final special scored by Vince Guaraldi
October 24, 1977	It's Your First Kiss, Charlie Brown	CBS	
February 23, 1978	What a Nightmare, Charlie Brown!	CBS	
March 19, 1979	You're the Greatest, Charlie Brown	CBS	
February 25, 1980	She's a Good Skate, Charlie Brown	CBS	
October 24, 1980	Life Is a Circus, Charlie Brown	CBS	
April 28, 1981	It's Magic, Charlie Brown	CBS	
October 30, 1981	Someday You'll Find Her, Charlie Brown	CBS	
May 24, 1982	A Charlie Brown Celebration	CBS	
February 21, 1983	Is This Goodbye, Charlie Brown?	CBS	
May 30, 1983	What Have We Learned, Charlie Brown?	CBS	
April 16, 1984	It's Flashbeagle, Charlie Brown	CBS	
March 20, 1985	Snoopy's Getting Married, Charlie Brown	CBS	
January 1, 1986	Happy New Year, Charlie Brown!	CBS	
March 16, 1990	Why, Charlie Brown, Why?	CBS	
May 1, 1991	Snoopy's Reunion	CBS	
May 28, 1992	It's Spring Training, Charlie Brown	CBS	
November 27, 1992	It's Christmastime Again, Charlie Brown	CBS	
January 18, 1994	You're in the Super Bowl, Charlie Brown	NBC	
February 14, 2002	A Charlie Brown Valentine	ABC	
December 8, 2002	Charlie Brown's Christmas Tales	ABC	
August 29, 2003	Lucy Must Be Traded, Charlie Brown	ABC	
December 9, 2003	I Want a Dog for Christmas, Charlie Brown	ABC	
November 20, 2006	He's a Bully, Charlie Brown	ABC	

==== Garfield ====
Airdate	Title	Network
October 25, 1982	Here Comes Garfield	CBS
September 14, 1983	Garfield on the Town	CBS
October 26, 1984	Garfield in the Rough	CBS
October 30, 1985	Garfield's Halloween Adventure	CBS
May 27, 1986	Garfield in Paradise	CBS
May 8, 1987	Garfield Goes Hollywood	CBS
December 21, 1987	A Garfield Christmas Special	CBS
November 22, 1988	Garfield: His 9 Lives	CBS
May 23, 1989	Garfield's Babes and Bullets	CBS
November 22, 1989	Garfield's Thanksgiving	CBS
May 18, 1990	Garfield's Feline Fantasies	CBS
May 8, 1991	Garfield Gets a Life	CBS

==== Other ====
Airdate	Title	Network	Notes
October 21, 1968	The Story of Babar, the Little Elephant	NBC	Babar adaptation Narrator: Peter Ustinov
September 7, 1971	Babar the Elephant Comes to America	NBC	Babar adaptation Narrator: Peter Ustinov
November 23, 1981	No Man's Valley	CBS	
March 20, 1985	The Romance of Betty Boop	CBS	Betty Boop special
May 15, 1987	Cathy	CBS	Cathy adaptation
November 11, 1988	Cathy's Last Resort	CBS	Cathy adaptation
February 10, 1989	Cathy's Valentine	CBS	Cathy adaptation

=== Animated television series ===
Title	Years	Network	Notes
Hot Dog	1970	NBC	Documentary series.
The Charlie Brown and Snoopy Show	1983-1985	CBS	
This Is America, Charlie Brown	1988-1989	CBS	
Garfield and Friends	1989-1994	CBS	
Mother Goose and Grimm	1991-1992	CBS	

=== Live-action and hybrid television specials ===
Airdate	Title	Network	Host	Notes
February 16, 1969	Children's Letters to God	NBC	Gene Kelly	Based on book compiled by Stoo Hample
March 18, 1969	Wonderful World of Pizzazz	NBC	Carl Reiner, Michele Lee	
May 10, 1969	Rod McKuen, The Loner	NBC		Concert
April 2, 1970	It Couldn't Be Done	NBC	Lee Marvin	Music score: The 5th Dimension
April 3, 1970	The Unexplained	NBC	Rod Serling	Encyclopedia Britannica television special
May 23, 1970	The New Communicators Pt. 1	NBC	Peter Fonda	
June 12, 1970	The New Communicators Pt. 2	NBC	Peter Fonda	
April 2, 1971	The Record Makers	NBC	Flip Wilson	
1975	Bill Russell Raps	—	Bill Russell	
October 13, 1975	Travels with Flip	NBC	Flip Wilson	
March 19, 1976	More Travels with Flip	NBC	Flip Wilson	
April 3, 1976	The Sport of the Century	CBS	William Conrad	
December 19, 1976	Christmas Around the World	NBC	Dick Van Dyke, Marilyn McCoo, Jonathan Winters, Gene Kelly	
May 15, 1977	The Billion Dollar Movies	NBC	David Niven	
April 24, 1978	The National Collegiate Cheerleading Championships	CBS	Cheryl Ladd	
May 19, 1979	Family Fun Time, U.S.A.: Marine World	CBS	Harvey Korman, Joey Heatherton	
February 8, 1981	The Big Stuffed Dog	NBC		Peanuts live-action special
1981	The New You Asked for It	NBC	Rich Little, Jack Smith	Pilot
May 24, 1983	Movie Blockbusters: The 15 Greatest Hits of All Time	CBS	Christopher Plummer	
May 7, 1984	John Ritter, Mr. T, Jacqueline Bisset... Going Back Home	ABC		
September 27, 1988	It's the Girl in the Red Truck, Charlie Brown	CBS		Peanuts live-action/animated hybrid

=== Documentaries ===
Airdate	Title	Network	Host	Notes
October 6, 1963	A Man Named Mays	NBC		
1963	A Boy Named Charlie Brown	—		Unaired Peanuts documentary (released in 2005); score by Vince Guaraldi
May 1, 1966	The Magic of Broadcasting	CBS	Bing Crosby, Lucille Ball, Arthur Godfrey, Sheldon Leonard, Rod Serling	Score by John Scott Trotter
December 3, 1967	John Steinbeck's America and Americans	NBC	Henry Fonda	
February 11, 1968	The Fabulous Funnies	NBC	Carl Reiner	
March 17, 1968	Travels with Charley	NBC	Henry Fonda	Based on 1962 travelogue by John Steinbeck
October 17, 1968	The Fabulous Shorts	NBC	Jim Backus	
May 24, 1969	Charlie Brown and Charles Schulz	CBS		Peanuts documentary; score by Vince Guaraldi
April 11, 1972	From Yellowstone to Tomorrow	NBC	George C. Scott	
1972	Close but Free	—		Feature-length docufiction exploring global views on marriage
April 26, 1974	Wild Science	NBC	Peter Falk	
July 17, 1974	A New Ballgame for Willie Mays	—	Jack Klugman	
December 2, 1974	Wild Places	NBC	Paul Newman, Joanne Woodward	
January 9, 1976	Happy Anniversary, Charlie Brown	CBS	Carl Reiner	Peanuts anniversary special
April 17, 1976	The Olympic Champions and Challengers	ABC	Telly Savalas	
January 5, 1979	Happy Birthday, Charlie Brown	CBS	Phyllis George	Peanuts anniversary special
May 15, 1980	The Fantastic Funnies	CBS	Loni Anderson	
October 8, 1980	To Remember...	PBS		Charles M. Schulz reflects on childhood, parenthood, and Snoopy's real-life inspiration, Spike; partially filmed in France
May 14, 1985	It's Your 20th Television Anniversary, Charlie Brown	CBS	Charles M. Schulz	Peanuts anniversary special
May 17, 1988	Happy Birthday, Garfield	CBS	Jim Davis	Garfield anniversary special
February 2, 1990	You Don't Look 40, Charlie Brown	CBS	Michele Lee	Peanuts anniversary special
1997	The Fantastic Funnies: The First 100 Years	CBS		Unaired
May 10, 2000	Here's to You, Charlie Brown: 50 Great Years	CBS	Whoopi Goldberg	Peanuts anniversary special
July 17, 2001	The Making of "A Charlie Brown Christmas"	ABC	Whoopi Goldberg	Peanuts documentary
2002	Common Men/Uncommon Valor	—		
November 30, 2015	It's Your 50th Christmas, Charlie Brown!	ABC	Kristen Bell	Peanuts anniversary special

== Direct-to-video/special format releases ==
=== Peanuts ===
Release date	Title	Format
1978	Tooth Brushing	Educational short
1979	Charlie Brown Clears the Air	Educational short
1980	It's Dental Flossophy, Charlie Brown!	Educational short
1986	It's Three Strikes, Charlie Brown	Video compilation
August 5, 1997	It Was My Best Birthday Ever, Charlie Brown	Direct-to-video
September 12, 2000	It's the Pied Piper, Charlie Brown	Direct-to-video

=== Other ===
Release date	Title	Format	Notes
1966	An Adventure with Spice Islands	Industrial film	Score by Vince Guaraldi
1966	Granny Goose Potato Chips	Television commercial	Score by Vince Guaraldi
1966	Pacific Telephone and Telegraph Company: Susan	Television commercial	Score by Vince Guaraldi
1967	Tips on Baseball from Willie Mays	Educational film	
1967	'67 West	Industrial film	Score by Vince Guaraldi
1970	Come to Your Senses	Experimental film	
1974	Willie Mays Talks Baseball	Educational film	
1974	Bicycles Are Beautiful	Industrial film	Hosted by Bill Cosby; score by Vince Guaraldi
1974	When Things Get Hectic, Think Metric	Industrial film	California Department of Education
December 16, 1986	Wrinkles: In Need of Cuddles	Direct-to-video	

== Music ==
=== Music and stage-related specials ===
Date	Title	Network	Notes
October 24, 1971	Snoopy at the Ice Follies	NBC	Broadcast presentation of stage performance
November 12, 1972	Snoopy's International Ice Follies	NBC	Broadcast presentation of stage performance
February 9, 1973	You're a Good Man, Charlie Brown	NBC	Live-action television film adaptation of the 1967 musical; presented as part of the Hallmark Hall of Fame series
November 13, 1973	Snoopy Directs the Ice Follies	NBC	Follow-up broadcast special of stage performance
May 24, 1978	Snoopy's Musical on Ice	CBS	Broadcast adaptation of Interstate Brands ice show; performance Hosts: Peggy Fleming, Charles M. Schulz
November 6, 1985	You're a Good Man, Charlie Brown	CBS	Animated adaptation of 1967 musical
January 29, 1988	Snoopy! The Musical	CBS	Animated adaptation of 1975 musical

=== Peanuts soundtrack discography ===
After Lee Mendelson's death in December 2019, his sons Jason and Sean Mendelson began reviewing the company's music archives, including materials related to Vince Guaraldi's scores for the Peanuts television specials. During the COVID-19 lockdowns, they located a cache of long-unavailable Guaraldi session tapes, which became the basis for a continuing series of archival soundtrack releases issued by LMFP (owner of the music publishing since 1990), occasionally in association with Craft Recordings. The series has included expanded or premiere soundtrack albums for several Peanuts specials, including A Charlie Brown Thanksgiving, It Was a Short Summer..., You're Not Elected..., Be My Valentine..., It's the Easter Beagle..., You're a Good Sport..., and a combined release of It's Arbor Day... and Charlie Brown's All Stars!.

These releases marked the first time many of Guaraldi's original television recordings had been made commercially available as standalone soundtrack albums. In addition to standard digital and physical releases, the series has included limited vinyl editions and compilation formats, such as Record Store Day selections and the CD box set The Peanuts Collection, Vol. 1.

Release date	Title	Notes
August 26, 2022	It's the Great Pumpkin, Charlie Brown: Original Soundtrack Recording (reissue)	Distributed in conjunction with Craft Recordings
October 20, 2023	A Charlie Brown Thanksgiving: Original Soundtrack Recording 50th Anniversary Special Edition	
July 5, 2024	It Was a Short Summer, Charlie Brown: Original Soundtrack Recording 55th Anniversary Edition	
September 6, 2024	You're Not Elected, Charlie Brown: Original Soundtrack Recording	
January 17, 2025	Be My Valentine, Charlie Brown: Original Soundtrack Recording 50th Anniversary Extended Edition	
March 21, 2025	It's the Easter Beagle, Charlie Brown: Original Soundtrack Recording Peanuts 75th Anniversary Edition	
April 12, 2025	Selections from the Original Soundtrack: It's the Easter Beagle, Charlie Brown	
July 11, 2025	You're a Good Sport, Charlie Brown: Original Soundtrack Recording 50th Anniversary Extended Edition	
October 17, 2025	The Peanuts Collection, Vol. 1	CD limited edition box set containing six previously released Peanuts soundtracks
January 23, 2026	Selections from the Original Soundtrack: Be My Valentine, Charlie Brown	
March 20, 2026	It's Arbor Day, Charlie Brown (50th Anniversary Extended Edition) / Charlie Brown's All Stars! (60th Anniversary Edition): Original Soundtrack Recordings (2026)	
September 18, 2026	It's a Mystery, Charlie Brown: Original Soundtrack Recording Extended Edition (2026)	

== See also ==
- Peanuts filmography
- List of Charlie Brown Records releases
- Melendez Films
