= This Is America, Charlie Brown =

American animated television miniseries

- Title card from "The Mayflower Voyagers"
- Genre: Documentary; Animated television special; Adventure; Comedy; Drama; Historical; Family
- Created by: Charles M. Schulz
- Written by: Charles M. Schulz; Lee Mendelson; Bill Melendez
- Directed by: Bill Melendez; Sam Jaimes; Evert Brown; Sam Nicholson
- Starring: Erin Chase; Jason Riffle; Erica Gayle; Ami Foster; Brittany M. Thornton; Christina Lange; Brandon Stewart; Jeremy Miller; Jason Muller; Marie Cole; Tani Taylor Powers; Keri Houlihan; Curtis Andersen; Hakeem Abdul-Samad; Grant Gelt; Bill Melendez
- Theme music composer: Ed Bogas; Dave Brubeck; David Benoit; George Winston; Wynton Marsalis; Dave Grusin; Vince Guaraldi
- Country of origin: United States
- Original language: English
- No. of episodes: 8

Production
- Producers: Lee Mendelson; Bill Melendez
- Cinematography: Nick Vasu
- Editors: Gordon D. Brenner; Chuck McCann; Warren Taylor
- Running time: 25 minutes
- Production companies: Lee Mendelson–Bill Melendez Productions; Charles M. Schulz Creative Associates; United Media Productions

Original release
- Network: CBS
- Release: October 21, 1988 – May 23, 1989

Related
- It's the Girl in the Red Truck, Charlie Brown (1988); You Don't Look 40, Charlie Brown (1990)

This Is America, Charlie Brown is an eight-part animated television miniseries that depicts a series of events in American history featuring characters from the Charles M. Schulz comic strip Peanuts. It aired from 1988 to 1989 on CBS. The first four episodes aired as a weekly series in October and November 1988; the final four episodes aired monthly from February to May 1989.

Due to the nature of the events portrayed and the historical figures included — such as the Wright Brothers and George Washington — many adults were shown in full view along with the Peanuts gang, something that happened rarely in the animated films and specials and in only one early sequence in the comic strip. These adults were drawn in a style similar to It's Only a Game, another comic strip by Schulz that featured adults, as well other productions that were overseen by Peanuts regular Bill Melendez.

All eight episodes were subsequently rerun by CBS in the summer of 1990. The series as a whole subsequently aired in the U.S. on Disney Channel between 1993 and 1997, then included in the Nickelodeon series You're on Nickelodeon, Charlie Brown between 1998 and 2003. A slightly abridged version of "The Mayflower Voyagers" returned to television in 2008 as companion material to pad the 1973 special A Charlie Brown Thanksgiving to a full one-hour time slot, airing in that arrangement until 2019, after which Apple TV+ withdrew the entire Peanuts filmography from traditional television (the airings of A Charlie Brown Thanksgiving sublicensed to PBS in 2020 and 2021 did not feature "The Mayflower Voyagers," since the excision of commercials allowed the older special to fit in a half-hour slot). It is available for streaming on Apple TV on July 3, 2026.

== Music ==
The series included music by many composers and performers including Peanuts regular Ed Bogas, Dave Brubeck, David Benoit (who would later take over scoring the specials starting with It's Christmastime Again, Charlie Brown), George Winston, Wynton Marsalis and Dave Grusin. This continued a tradition of using jazz musicians for the musical score; original composer Vince Guaraldi had died in 1976, though several of his music scores were reused, notably his signature tune, "Linus and Lucy". This miniseries featured The Winans, Desirée Goyette, and Lou Rawls as the singing vocals (Goyette and Rawls had previously worked with Melendez on the Garfield TV specials).

== Cast ==
=== Regular voice actors ===
- Erin Chase as Charlie Brown
- Erica Gayle as Lucy van Pelt
- Brittany M. Thornton as Sally Brown
- Brandon Stewart as Linus van Pelt
- Jason Mendelson as Peppermint Patty
- Marie Cole as Marcie (in The Great Inventors, The Smithsonian and the Presidency and The Music and Heroes of America)
- Curtis Andersen as Schroeder
- Hakeem Abdul-Samad as Franklin
- Tani Taylor Powers as Marcie (in The Mayflower Voyagers and The Wright Brothers at Kitty Hawk)
- Bill Melendez as Snoopy and Woodstock
- Jason Riffle: Charlie Brown (in The Birth of The Constitution)
- Jeremy Miller: Linus van Pelt (in The Birth of The Constitution)
- Ami Foster: Lucy van Pelt (in The Birth of The Constitution)
- Christina Lange: Sally Brown (in The Birth of The Constitution)
- Keri Houlihan: Marcie (in The Birth of The Constitution)
- Cameron Clarke: Snoopy (singing voice in The Music and Heroes of America)
- Sean Mendelson: Pilgrim Boy (in The Mayflower Voyagers)
- Grant Gelt: Franklin (in The NASA Space Station)

Pig-Pen, Violet, and other characters appear a few times but are silent.

=== Additional voice actors ===
- Frank Welker - Captain Smith (in The Mayflower Voyagers), Pilgrim Explorer 2 (in The Mayflower Voyagers), Squanto (in The Mayflower Voyagers), George Mason (in The Birth of The Constitution), Gouverneur Morris (in The Birth of The Constitution), Wilbur Wright (in The Wright Brothers at Kitty Hawk), Jason Welker (in The NASA Space Station), Alexander Graham Bell (in The Great Inventors), Thomas Edison (in The Great Inventors), Abraham Lincoln (in The Smithsonian and the Presidency), Theodore Roosevelt (in The Smithsonian and the Presidency)
- Gregg Berger - Pilgrim Leader (in The Mayflower Voyagers), Myles Standish (in The Mayflower Voyagers), Pilgrim Explorers (in The Mayflower Voyagers), Orville Wright (in The Wright Brothers at Kitty Hawk), NASA Mission Control (in The NASA Space Station), Thomas Watson (in The Great Inventors), Samuel (in The Smithsonian and the Presidency)
- Chris Collins as Mayflower Watchman (in The Mayflower Voyagers), Samoset (in The Mayflower Voyagers)
- Hal Smith as George Washington (in The Birth of the Constitution), James Wilson (in The Birth of The Constitution), Benjamin Franklin (in The Birth of the Constitution), John Muir (in The Smithsonian and the Presidency)
- Julie Payne - Mrs. Holiday (in The Great Inventors)
- Bud Davis
- Chuck Olson
- Shep Menken
- Brandon Horne
- Marie Wise
- Alissa King

== Episodes ==
No.	Title	Directed by	Written by	Music by	Original release date
1	"The Mayflower Voyagers"	Evert Brown	Charles M. Schulz & Lee Mendelson	Ed Bogas	October 21, 1988
In 1620, the Peanuts gang are among the 30 children aboard the Mayflower set to establish Plymouth Colony. While hardships plague the new colony and claim the lives of many of its members, all of the children survive, and the Pilgrims' faith in God allows them to persevere. In the spring of 1621, with the colony's future uncertain, the Pilgrims meet Native Americans Samoset and Squanto, who miraculously speak English. The natives teach the Pilgrims how to live off the land, leading to the first Thanksgiving and a 50-year peace treaty.
2	"The Birth of the Constitution"	Evert Brown	Charles M. Schulz & Lee Mendelson	George Winston	October 28, 1988
The story takes place in 1787 in Philadelphia. The Founding Fathers are trying to compose the Constitution. They work hard to decide which ideas to include. Charlie Brown and his friends work hard, too. Snoopy serves as watchdog, Peppermint Patty provides water to drink. Charlie Brown oversees "valet parking," and Linus is the usher.
3	"The Wright Brothers at Kitty Hawk"	Sam Jaimes	Charles M. Schulz & Lee Mendelson	Wynton Marsalis	November 4, 1988
In 1903, Charlie Brown and Linus visit Linus' cousin Dolly in Kitty Hawk, North Carolina and watch as the Wright Brothers send their prototype airplane aloft. Additionally, Woodstock demonstrates the principles of flight, Peppermint Patty and Marcie are mechanics for the Wright Brothers aircraft, and Snoopy becomes top dog and oversees the events leading to the flight that changed the world.
4	"The NASA Space Station"	Sam Jaimes	Charles M. Schulz & Lee Mendelson	Dave Brubeck	November 11, 1988
Linus dreams about himself, Charlie Brown, Sally Brown, Lucy van Pelt, "Pig-Pen", Franklin, Peppermint Patty, Snoopy, and Woodstock traveling in outer space.
5	"The Building of the Transcontinental Railroad"	Sam Nicholson	Lee Mendelson & Bill Melendez	Ed Bogas; Vocals by The Winans	February 10, 1989
Charlie Brown tells the story of how two companies, the Union Pacific Railroad and the Central Pacific Railroad, constructed the First transcontinental railroad through plains and imposing mountains. The episode ends when the gang witnesses the completion of the railroad in Promontory, Utah in 1869.
6	"The Great Inventors"	Bill Melendez	Lee Mendelson & Bill Melendez	David Benoit	March 10, 1989
Each member of the Peanuts gang reports on various American inventions. Linus discusses Alexander Graham Bell while Peppermint Patty and Marcie talk about Thomas Edison, and Charlie Brown writes a report on the history of the automobile, namely its development through the respective work of the Duryea Brothers and Henry Ford.
7	"The Smithsonian and the Presidency"	Bill Melendez	Lee Mendelson & Bill Melendez	Dave Grusin	April 19, 1989
The gang visits the Smithsonian Institution, where they discuss three former United States presidents; Abraham Lincoln, Theodore Roosevelt and Franklin D. Roosevelt.
8	"The Music and Heroes of America"	Sam Jaimes	Lee Mendelson & Bill Melendez	Ed Bogas & Desirée Goyette; Vocals by Lou Rawls, Desirée Goyette, & Cameron Clarke	May 23, 1989
Schroeder tries to present a school pageant about great American musicians, ranging from Stephen Foster to John Philip Sousa to rock'n'rollers, but is continually interrupted by the antics of both Snoopy and Lucy, who wants to give her report on famous American heroes—including Susan B. Anthony, Amelia Earhart, George Washington Carver, and Martin Luther King Jr.—on the same stage at the same time. At the end, Charlie Brown names his favorite song: Vince Guaraldi's "Linus and Lucy".

== Home media ==
The 8 episodes, originally released individually on videocassette, were released in a two-DVD collector's set on March 28, 2006, by Paramount Home Entertainment. However, the DVD set went out of print once Warner Bros. purchased the rights to all Peanuts television specials. Warner Home Video has since reissued the miniseries on DVD as of June 17, 2014, with all the episodes presented in remastered form. It was also released on digital format.
