= The Romance of Betty Boop =

- Written by: Ron Friedman
- Directed by: Bill Melendez
- Starring: Desirée Goyette; Frank W. Buxton
- Music by: Harry Ruby; Harry Warren; Desirée Goyette and Ed Bogas (music and lyrics)
- Country of origin: United States
- Original language: English

Production
- Producers: Bill Melendez; Lee Mendelson
- Running time: 25 minutes
- Production company: Mendelson/Melendez Productions

Original release
- Network: CBS
- Release: March 20, 1985

The Romance of Betty Boop is an animated television special featuring Betty Boop that aired on CBS on March 20, 1985. The half-hour special was rebroadcast on CBS in December 1987.

== Plot summary ==
The story is set in New York City in 1939, during the Great Depression. The film opens with a New York montage, as a voiceover in mock period style introduces the story of "a romantic hardworking New Yorker, an independent girl who wants nothing more than to put her feet up and marry a handsome millionaire." Desirée Goyette sings "Just Give 'Em Your Boop-Oop-a-Doop" over the opening credits. Scraps of popular songs, especially "I Only Have Eyes for You", appear throughout the film.

Betty Boop is a girl who is adored by her neighborhood and courted by Freddie the iceman, but who dreams of moving in high society and achieving "personal greatness". Betty sells shoes by day and performs at Club Bubbles by night. Uncle Mischa Bubble, the Russian owner of the club, is threatened by mob boss Johnny Throat and his two henchmen because he cannot pay his debts. Seeing Betty perform on the stage, Throat decides to take over the club to force Betty to go out with him.

Betty sings "I Wanna Be Loved By You" to attract the attention of Waldo Van Lavish, a millionaire playboy. Betty goes on a date with Waldo, during which he says he wants Betty to meet his parents, so she believes he wants to marry her. Later, on her way to meet him, Betty is kidnapped by Throat's henchmen and taken to his apartment. Uncle Mischa calls Freddie to rescue Betty, but Betty escapes on her own. She meets Waldo's aged parents and discovers that Waldo merely wants her to be a maid in his parents' house. At the end, Betty apologizes to Freddie for ignoring him and gives him a kiss. To Freddie's dismay, however, she then gets a call from Hollywood to do a screen test.

== Cast ==
- Desirée Goyette as Betty Boop
- Marsha Meyers as Beverly
- John Stephenson as the Announcer
- Sandy Kenyon as Uncle Mischa Bubbles
- Sean Allan as Freddie
- Frank W. Buxton as the Parrot
- Derek McGrath as Waldo Van Lavish
- Robert Towers as Chuckles
- George R. Wendt as Johnny Throat and Punchie
- Ron Friedman as Ethnic Voices

== Soundtrack ==
- "Just Give 'Em Your Boop-Oop-A-Doop"

Sung by Desiree Goyette

- "Independent Girl"

Sung by Desiree Goyette

- "Bei Mir Bist Du Shein"

Sung by Ron Friedman

- '"I Can't Give You Anything But Love"

Sung by Desiree Goyette

- "I Wanna Be Loved by You"

Sung by Desirée Goyette

- "I Only Have Eyes for You"

Sung by Desirée Goyette and Sean Allan
