= Marine Jahan =

French actress and dancer (born 1958)

- Born: September 17, 1958 (age 67); Versailles, France
- Occupations: Dancer, actress

Marine Jahan (French: [ma.ʁin ʒa.ɑ̃]; born September 17, 1958, in Versailles, France) is a French actress and dancer.

== Career ==
In the United States, she is known for dancing as one of the body-doubles for Jennifer Beals in the 1983 film Flashdance.

At the time of the film's release, Jahan's role raised controversy for several reasons. Beals was a relatively unknown actress before Flashdance, and throughout the film, close-ups purported to be Beals' body were actually of Jahan.

However, Jahan's contribution was not listed in the film's opening or ending credits, and because the film was a hit by the time the truth of her participation became known, viewers felt deceived to learn they were watching Jahan's dancing and bicycle riding, not Beals'. Simpson and Bruckheimer, producers of the film, first claimed they weren't attempting to conceal the use of the pair of doubles, then claimed Jahan was not credited because Paramount Pictures "...shortened the closing credits...".

In 1984, Jahan appeared as a dancer in "Torchie's" bar in Streets of Fire.

In 1985, she worked for Italian broadcast RAI at the show Il tastomatto.

In 1987, Jahan was the featured half-time dancer at Super Bowl XXI during the Flashdance... What a Feeling number.

Jahan was also the model used for Snoopy in the Peanuts special It's Flashbeagle, Charlie Brown; Snoopy was animated as Jahan's dance moves via rotoscoping.

In 1997, Jahan also played the role of Madame St. Cyr in the Broadway production of The Scarlet Pimpernel.

In 1986, she was a guest on the television program The Wizard portraying a paralyzed dancer.
