= Snoopy's Reunion =

1991 animated television special

- Genre: Animated TV Special
- Created by: Charles M. Schulz
- Written by: Charles M. Schulz
- Directed by: Sam Jaimes
- Voices of: Philip Shafran; Josh Keaton; Kaitlyn Walker; Bill Melendez; Megan Parlen; Laurel Page; Steven Slofiar
- Composer: Judy Munsen
- Country of origin: United States

Production
- Executive producer: Lee Mendelson
- Producer: Bill Melendez
- Editor: Rick Hinson
- Camera setup: Nick Vasu
- Running time: 23 minutes
- Production companies: Lee Mendelson Film Productions; Bill Melendez Productions

Original release
- Network: CBS
- Release: May 1, 1991

Related
- Why, Charlie Brown, Why? (1990); It's Spring Training, Charlie Brown (1992)

From left to right: Andy, Marbles, Spike, Snoopy, Olaf, Molly, Rover and Belle. Five of the siblings appeared at some point in the Peanuts comic strip; Molly and Rover only appear in this special.

Snoopy's Reunion is the 34th prime-time animated TV special based upon the comic strip Peanuts, by Charles M. Schulz. It originally aired on the CBS network on May 1, 1991, as part of the animated anthology series Toon Nite. It is one of the few Peanuts specials to feature adults on-screen.

== Plot ==
At the Daisy Hill Puppy Farm, a litter of eight beagles are born to a dog called Missy: Snoopy and his siblings Spike, Belle, Olaf, Molly, Rover, Andy, and Marbles. The puppies spend their time on the farm enjoying food and playing music with each other, but sadly await the day they will all be separated as they are sold by the farmer to new owners. Meanwhile, Charlie Brown, depressed from a recent defeat in baseball, expresses a desire to his sister Sally to have his own dog.

Snoopy is the first puppy to be sold, to a girl named Lila (previously seen in Snoopy Come Home). The other puppies follow, with Olaf being the last one. The farmer and Missy believe that the puppies have gone off to permanent, better lives. Snoopy and Lila bond easily, but after owning him for some time Lila learns that the landlord has changed the rules in her apartment complex, forbidding the ownership of dogs. Heartbroken, she is forced to take Snoopy back to the farm. The farmer assures Snoopy that they will find him a new home, though Snoopy is clearly affected by the separation from Lila.

Charlie Brown discovers an ad in the paper placed by the Daisy Hill Puppy Farm, and travels there with Linus. Charlie Brown and Snoopy meet for the first time, and quickly bond. On their way home, Linus informs Charlie Brown that Snoopy was previously owned by someone else. Charlie Brown declares it does not matter as Snoopy is now his dog. He quickly learns that Snoopy is a rather unusual dog, from sleeping on the roof of his kennel to taking up human activities like sports.

Five years later, Charlie Brown and Sally notice that Snoopy misses his family, and decide to organize a reunion at the Daisy Hill Puppy Farm. They send out invitations to his siblings, who all agree to attend, bringing their instruments along. When they get to the site of the farm, however, they discover that it was sold for redevelopment and is now buried beneath a parking garage. Though Charlie Brown and Sally are saddened, the siblings are happy to be together again and choose to go on with their reunion, playing their instruments together as they did when they were puppies.

At the end of the reunion, Charlie Brown wonders aloud how Snoopy's siblings will get home. Snoopy adapts his World War I flying ace persona and proceeds to fly all of his siblings home on his kennel. An incredulous Charlie Brown asks Linus how this is even possible, to which Linus replies, "Well, he's your dog, Charlie Brown."

== Continuity ==
This special is not adapted from any particular Peanuts storyline in the comics, instead drawing inspiration from various different storylines and media. Namely, it adapts a strip from November 24, 1972, where Snoopy tries to visit the Daisy Hill Puppy Farm with Woodstock only to discover its fate and bemoan that people are "parking on [his] memories" (a line instead spoken in the special by Charlie Brown).

Charles Schulz did not consider material from the television specials and films to be canonical with the Peanuts comic strip. Coupled with Schulz's own tendency to rewrite continuity over the years, this results in some inconsistencies from previous Peanuts media:

- In the comic strip, Snoopy existed as Charlie Brown's dog long before Sally and Linus were born. In this special, Charlie Brown doesn't acquire him until long after they were born.
- In the comic strip, Charlie Brown and Snoopy knew each other before the former adopted him. In this special, Charlie Brown sees Snoopy for the first time.
- In the comic strip, Snoopy acts as an ordinary dog prior to his adoption by Charlie Brown. In this special, he is already talented when Charlie Brown adopts him.
- In Snoopy Come Home, Lila had to take Snoopy back to the Daisy Hill Puppy Farm because she and her parents moved to an apartment building where the landlord did not allow dogs. In this special during the flashback, the "apartment's no dog policy" is retained and is the same reason for Snoopy's return, although Lila lived in the apartment for long and the landlord had suddenly imposed the new rule.
- Originally in the strip and later in the 1972 movie Snoopy Come Home and the 1980 special Life Is a Circus, Charlie Brown, Charlie Brown tells Linus about how a kid dumped sand on him and made him cry, and the next day he and his parents went to the Daisy Hill Puppy Farm to get Snoopy. In this special, the two friends both go to get him.
- In the strip and Snoopy Come Home, Linus calls the Daisy Hill Puppy Farm to find out about Snoopy's history when he goes to see Lila in the hospital, and finds out that he was a "used dog". In this special, when Charlie Brown and Linus go to pick him up, Linus finds out about his history in a ledger sitting on a desk.

== Voice cast ==
- Phil Shafran as Charlie Brown
- Josh Keaton as Linus van Pelt (credited as Josh Wiener)
- Kaitlyn Walker as Sally Brown
- Bill Melendez as Snoopy and his siblings
- Megan Parlen as Lila
- Laurel Page as Lila's mom
- Steve Stoliar as Bus Driver/Farmer

== Home Media ==
On October 7, 2025, it was re-released on the DVD and Blu-Ray collection Peanuts: 75th Anniversary Ultimate TV Specials Collection along with 39 other Peanuts specials.
