= You're a Good Man, Charlie Brown (TV special) =

1985 animated television musical

- Genre: Animation
- Created by: Charles M. Schulz
- Based on: You're a Good Man, Charlie Brown by: Clark Gesner; John Gordon
- Directed by: Sam Jaimes
- Voices of: Brad Kesten; Kevin Brando; David T. Wagner; Jessica Lee Smith; Tiffany Reinbolt; Jeremy Reinbolt; Michael Dockery; Robert Towers; Bill Melendez
- Composers: Clark Gesner; Ed Bogas
- Country of origin: United States
- Original language: English

Production
- Executive producers: Lee Mendelson; Charles M. Schulz
- Producers: Lee Mendelson; Bill Melendez
- Editors: Chuck McCann; Julie Maryon
- Camera setup: Nick Vasu
- Running time: 48 minutes
- Production companies: Charles M. Schulz Creative Associates; United Media Productions; Mendelson-Melendez Productions

Original release
- Network: CBS
- Release: November 6, 1985

Related
- Snoopy's Getting Married, Charlie Brown (1985); Happy New Year, Charlie Brown! (1986)

You're a Good Man, Charlie Brown is the 29th prime-time animated musical television special based upon the comic strip Peanuts, by Charles M. Schulz. This adaptation of the 1967 musical You're a Good Man, Charlie Brown originally aired on the CBS network on November 6, 1985, and rebroadcast on June 14, 1988. The special was produced by Charles M. Schulz Creative Associates and Mendelson-Melendez Productions.

== Plot ==
The program opens with the other Peanuts characters singing the title song to Charlie Brown.

In the next scene, Schroeder plays Beethoven's "Moonlight Sonata" and Lucy sings along. She tries to tell him that they should get married. Schroeder ignores her, then Lucy says, "My aunt Marian was right; never try to discuss marriage with a musician."

Charlie Brown hopes for the first time to be able to keep a kite but he once again fails. Sally writes a letter to Ann Flanders about the Valentine's Day card she gets.

Charlie Brown gives Lucy a Valentine's Day card and mistakenly says, "This is for you, Lucy. Merry Christmas!" Charlie Brown sees Marcie and thinks that she is going to give him a Valentine's Day card but she does not. Lucy comes up to Schroeder again and talks about saucepans, and, again, Schroeder cannot stand it.

Snoopy imagines that he is a wild animal. Charlie Brown, Schroeder, Linus, and Lucy work on their book reports on Peter Rabbit ("Book Report"). Lucy teaches Linus about nature in her own way while Charlie Brown tries to correct her, to no avail ("Little Known Facts").

Charlie Brown writes a letter to his pencil pal about his downfall at his baseball game. Charlie Brown pleads his baseball team to win the game by chanting "T-E-A-M" but fails. Lucy dreams of becoming a queen but gives up dreaming. Charlie Brown tries to get the Little Red-Haired Girl to know him better but fails.

Schroeder's Sing Along has songs for the play in "The Concert" by singing "Home on the Range" with his friends. And the five friends sing while Lucy, Linus, and Sally argue. Lucy wanting her pencil back from Linus, and threatening to tell Sally what he said about her if he did not give back the pencil (Linus called Sally an enigma). Snoopy sings a song devoted to "Suppertime" when he sees Charlie Brown serving him his supper.

In the end, Charlie Brown and all of his gang learn all about "Happiness" and why it's all around them; the special ends with Lucy telling Charlie Brown that he is a good man, pleasing Charlie Brown.

== Voice cast ==
- Brad Kesten as Charlie Brown (speaking voice)
  - Kevin Brando as Charlie Brown (singing voice)
- Michael Dockery as Marcie
- Jeremy Reinbolt as Schroeder
- Tiffany Reinbolt as Sally Brown
- Jessica Lee Smith as Lucy van Pelt
- David T. Wagner as Linus van Pelt
- Robert Towers as Snoopy (when talking and singing)
- Bill Melendez as Snoopy (when making his dog sounds) and Woodstock

Note: Peppermint Patty, Franklin, 5, and Frieda appeared in the special but had no lines.

== Home media ==
Warner Home Video released You're a Good Man, Charlie Brown on DVD for the first time on January 26, 2010, as a part of their Charlie Brown "Remastered Deluxe Edition" line. The DVD included a featurette entitled "Animating a Charlie Brown Musical".

On October 7, 2025, it was released on the DVD and Blu-Ray collection Peanuts: 75th Anniversary Ultimate TV Specials Collection along with 39 other Peanuts specials.
