= Industrial video =

Film created for an industrial company

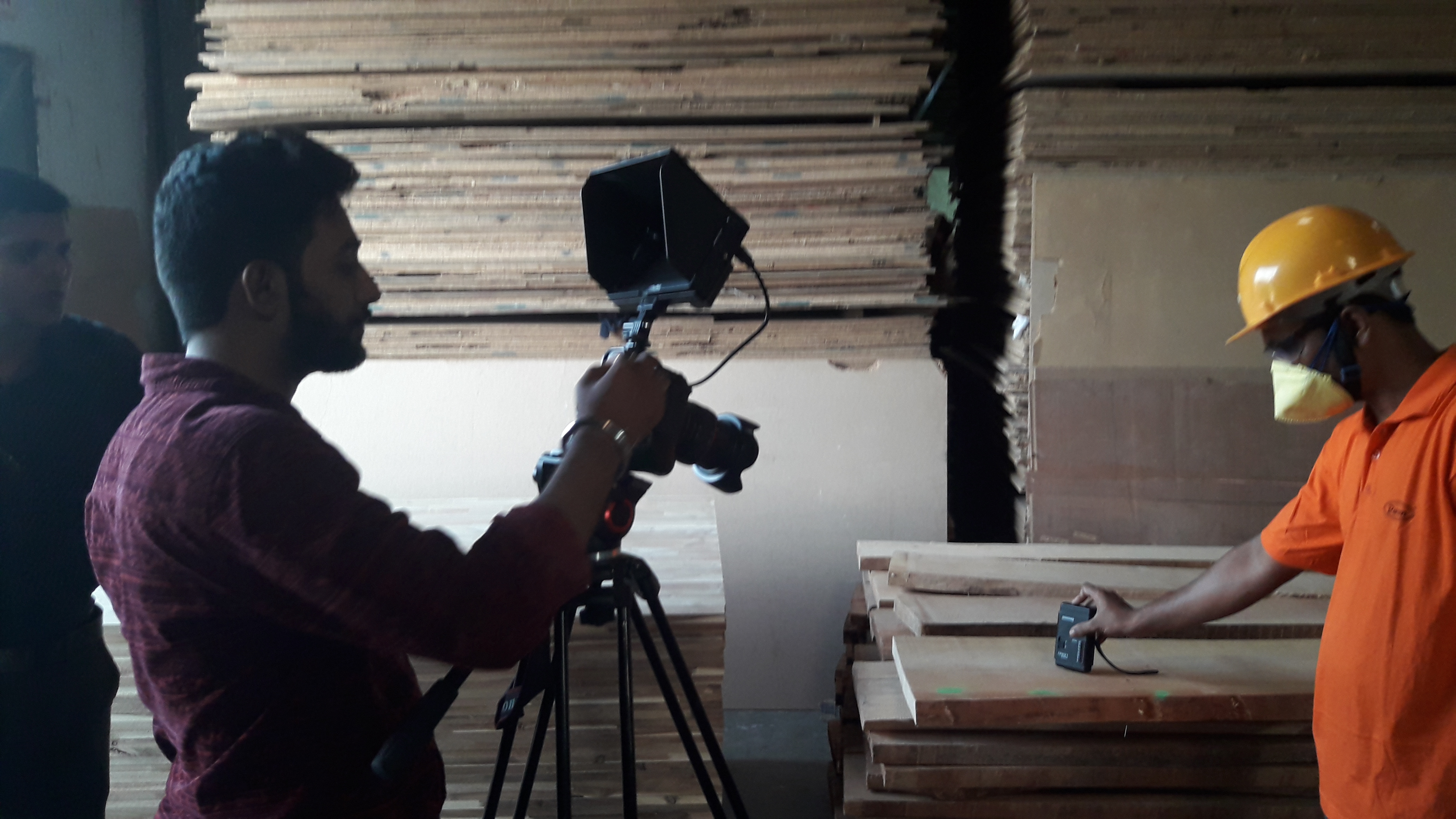
An industrial video being shot in India

An industrial video is a video that targets industry as its primary audience. An industrial video is a type of sponsored film (such as an educational film) which prioritizes pragmatism over artistic value. While the primary purpose of an educational film is to inform an audience, the purpose of an industrial video can vary depending on the client.

== Purposes ==
An industrial video may be used for:

- Marketing, communicating to potential clients the value of services or products.
- Customers, such as a video that explains how to use a product
- Fundraising, such as for informing potential investors about the merits of a company, or generating capital for a charitable cause.
- Corporations, such as a video that shares a CEO's vision with his employees, or a video that warns employees against improper ethical behavior.

Industrial videos have become more prevalent in the market than industrial films because of the lower cost of producing video content.

== Content creation ==
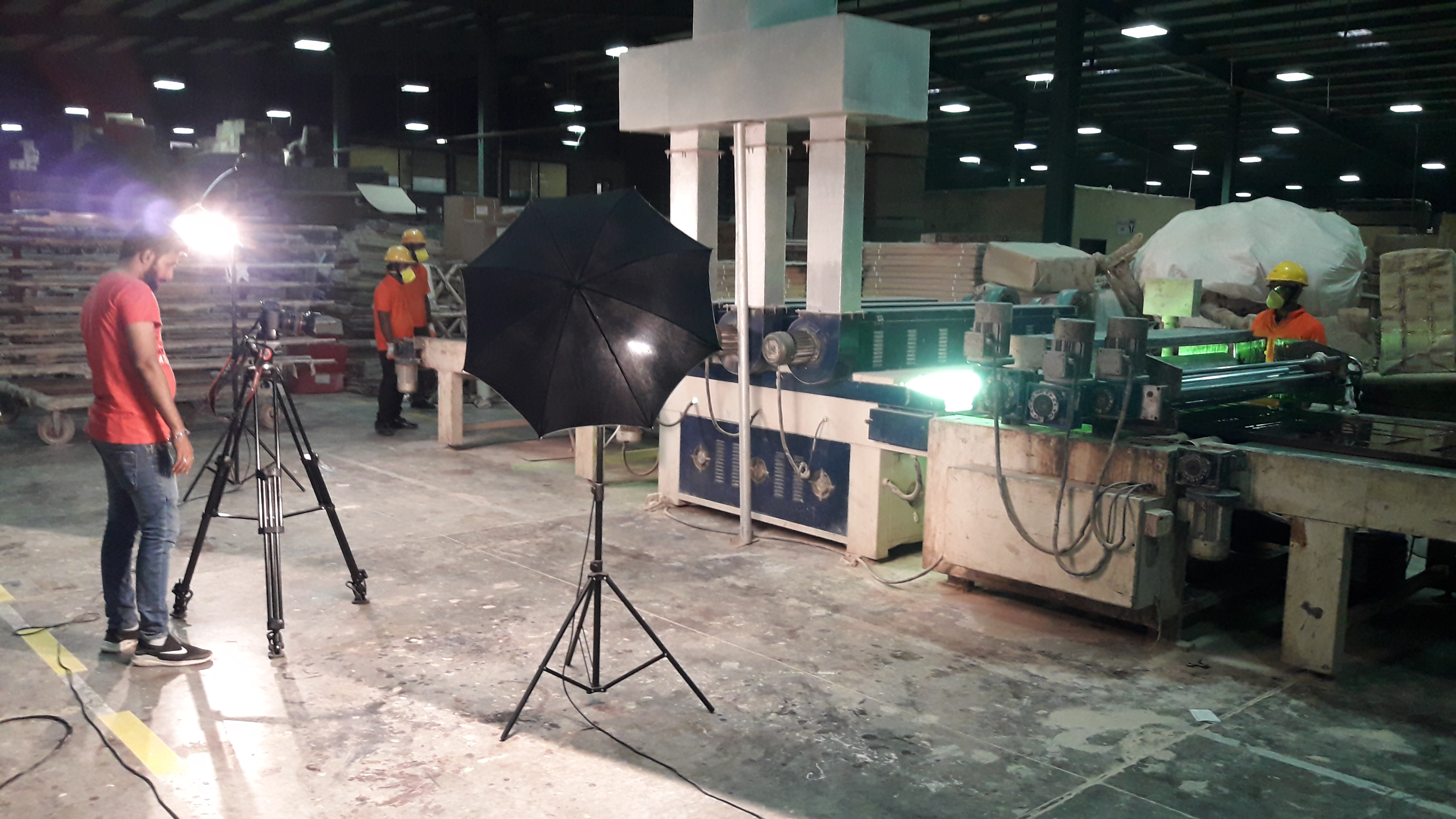
Behind the scenes of an industrial video

Like all filmmaking, industrial videos go through the stages of development, pre-production, production, post-production and distribution. During the development stage, a sponsor chooses a video production company that they believe can best meet their needs. Producers of industrial videos can hire technical writers. These technical writers attempt to translate difficult technical information from "subject matter experts" into a script that is more understandable to a general audience. Alternatively, other industrial video production companies target a specialized niche where the producer, director or writer already has expertise. Once a production company is contracted, the project enters pre-production, when the script is written, talent is hired, and materials are obtained.

These individual elements are used during production, when a video camera records the talent and audio is captured by a microphone. During post-production, the footage from the production phase is assembled into a coherent whole. Finally, the final product is distributed and exhibited. If the project was a training video, the video may be included with the product, so the buyer can learn to use it most effectively. If the project was a marketing video, it may be directly mailed to potential clients to encourage them to buy the product; or, if the product was designed for exhibition, it may be shown at a trade fair. The use of industrial videos for corporate use has been increasing, suggesting that industrial videos will continue to be produced in the future.

== See also ==
- Corporate video
- Technical writer
- Technical communication
- Video production companies
