= It's the Girl in the Red Truck, Charlie Brown =

1988 animated television special

- Genre: Animation/live-action TV special
- Based on: Peanuts by Charles M. Schulz
- Written by: Charles M. Schulz; Monte Schulz
- Directed by: Walter C. Miller
- Starring: Jill Schulz; Molly Brice; Greg Deason
- Voices of: Steven Stoliar; Jason Riffle; Bill Melendez
- Music by: Paul Rodriguez
- Country of origin: United States
- Original language: English

Production
- Executive producer: Charles M. Schulz
- Producers: Bill Melendez; Lee Mendelson
- Running time: 48 minutes
- Production companies: Lee Mendelson Film Productions; Bill Melendez Productions

Original release
- Network: CBS
- Release: September 27, 1988

Related
- Snoopy!!! The Musical (1988); This Is America, Charlie Brown (1988–1989)

It's the Girl in the Red Truck, Charlie Brown is the 32nd prime-time animated television special based upon the comic strip Peanuts, by Charles M. Schulz. It is a hybrid of animation and live-action footage, and features Snoopy’s brother Spike in lieu of the core Peanuts characters. A spin-off focused on Spike's unrequited love for a young woman, it was described as being similar to Beauty and the Beast. This Peanuts special was not well-received by critics.

== Plot ==
Spike waves to a young woman driving an old red Chevrolet pickup truck through the desert of Needles, California every day; it is the highlight of his day. In this combined animated and live-action special, we meet her, aerobics instructor Jenny, who wants to be a big city jazz dancer. She and Spike drive around, looking at the desert scenery and spending some time at a roller rink. However, when Spike is accidentally thrown out of the rink, he runs off, and is pursued by people on a nighttime coyote hunt.

A sub-plot sees Jenny's boyfriend, Jeff, set up an audition for her, which she is angry about because he did it without consulting her.

== Production ==
It is a departure from the usual Peanuts specials. Apart from the animated introduction, the entire show is a mixture of live-action and animation. While most specials include a variety of characters from the comic strip, like Charlie Brown, Snoopy, Linus, and Lucy, this one is centered on Snoopy's brother, Spike.

It starts with a brief animated introduction with Charlie Brown and Snoopy, introducing the character of Spike to audiences. Schulz apparently was against this scene, feeling that fans would already be familiar with the supporting character.

Production of the film took four years, and cost "millions of dollars". A serious film buff who watched both foreign and art films, Schulz commented, "I wanted this to be my Citizen Kane, but it's not."

Many cast members were from Schulz's friends, family, or neighborhood. His daughter, Jill, was cast in the lead role of Jenny, while his son, Monte, helped write the script. Bit player Molly Brice was discovered by Schulz from a Santa Rosa Little Theatre production of The Oldest Living Graduate.

Director Walter Miller's regular projects include the Academy Awards telecast, and was used to working with name actors. Miller and Schulz had previously worked together, when the director worked on a broadcast of a Peanuts ice show. The film's music was provided by Paul Rodriguez, who composed for Redwood Empire's ice shows.

As the animation/live-action technique requires, characters were animated later to work with the motions of the live actors. On occasion, Spike would be the only character to appear on screen, meaning only the set would be filmed. Director Miller commented "I never shot so much plain brown dirt in my life."

Fake saguaro cacti were purchased for $1,000 each, as the actual ones in the desert were not placed right for the action. The truck featured cost just $300, "and looks it".

== Critical reception ==
The special was originally titled The Girl in the Red Truck, and was scheduled to air in March 1988. Numerous production delays caused it to be aired in September 1988, after the release of Who Framed Roger Rabbit. While films throughout the ages have used a mix of animation and live-action (the Alice comedies, Song of the South, Mary Poppins) before, Schulz worried that viewers would assume he copied the new film's technique. He instructed his daughter Jill to clearly emphasize the program's conception date during interviews.

The special was not well-received upon its initial airing and received mixed to negative reviews. The New York Times decided "the similarities between the two [Roger Rabbit and It's the Girl in the Red Truck] are superficial", describing it as "relatively primitive" and "generally clumsy" and stating that the interaction was "not terribly convincing". Of the show's plot, he commented that the "story goes nowhere."

Jill Schulz shouldered much of the blame. John J. O'Connor, critic for The New York Times wrote, "Part of the problem may be that this production is a family project, the sort of thing that gets bogged down in good intentions and parental pride.... Although she is perky and likable, and she does a passable dance routine on roller skates, her performance does little or nothing to enliven the spiritless proceedings."

As of Good Grief being written in 1989, Schulz was still considering further attempts at a "masterpiece". Rheta Grimsley Johnson suggested it might be "a quiet story about cancer", inspired by the special Why, Charlie Brown, Why? which aired in March 1990.

== Cast ==
- Jason Riffle as the voice of Charlie Brown
- Steven Stoliar as French Teacher on Cassette
- Jill Schulz as Jenny
- Molly Brice as Molly
- Greg Deason as Jeff
- Bill Melendez as the voice of Spike

== Home media ==
This special has rarely been televised since its original broadcast in 1988. Disney Channel aired it only once on October 1, 1995, as part of the Peanuts’ 45th anniversary marathon.

The special was released on VHS by Paramount Home Media Distribution on January 9, 1996. It has yet to be released on DVD, Blu-ray, or on any digital formats.
