= Robert Towers =

American actor (born 1936)

- Born: August 19, 1936 (age 89); New York City, New York, U.S.
- Occupation: Actor
- Years active: 1961-2024
- Children: 2

Robert Towers (born August 19, 1936) is a retired American actor who has appeared in many television shows, including Star Trek: The Next Generation. He also played Buster the coke-snorting jockey on It's Always Sunny in Philadelphia in season 3 episode "The Gang Gets Whacked". He played the teenage Benjamin in the feature film, The Curious Case of Benjamin Button. Towers provided the speaking and singing voice of Snoopy in You're a Good Man, Charlie Brown, reprising the role he played on stage in Los Angeles.

== Select filmography ==
=== Animated roles ===
- Doctor Dolittle – Various Animals
- Kidd Video – Cool Cat
- Pole Position – Additional Voices
- You're a Good Man, Charlie Brown – Snoopy (speaking/singing)

=== Television roles ===
- The Banana Splits – Voices / in-suit performer (1969–70: 9 episodes)
- Star Trek: The Next Generation – Rata (1987 episode: "The Battle")
- Angel - High Priest (2003 episode: "Peace Out")
- It's Always Sunny in Philadelphia - Buster (2007 episode: "The Gang Gets Whacked (Part 1)")
- Hannah Montana – Albert Einstein / Old man (2009, 2011: 2 episodes)
- Victorious – Tuberculosis Patient (2011 episode: "Tori Gets Stuck")
- Raven's Home – Commando Joe (2017 episode: "In-vision of Privacy")
- Bunk'd – Gerald Barker (2018 episode: "Finders Keepers, Lou's A Weeper")
- Perry Mason - Thread Factory Owner (2020 episode "Chapter Two")
- Hunters - Heinrich Hansöm (2023 episode "The Home")

=== Film roles ===
- Masters of the Universe – Karg
- Switch – Mental Patient
- The Curious Case of Benjamin Button – Benjamin Button (adult Benjamin)
- Rockin' with Judy Jetson – Additional Voices

=== Video game roles ===
- Star Trek: 25th Anniversary Enhanced – Crewman #1, Biabli, Lights
- Stonekeep – Rek, Sharga Rebel
