= Life Is a Circus, Charlie Brown =

1980 television special

- Genre: Animated television special
- Based on: Peanuts by Charles M. Schulz
- Written by: Charles M. Schulz
- Directed by: Phil Roman
- Voices of: Michael Mandy; Brent Hauer; Casey Carlson; Earl "Rocky" Reilly; Kristen Fullerton; Shannon Cohn; Christopher Donohoe; Bill Melendez
- Music by: Ed Bogas; Judy Munsen
- Country of origin: United States
- Original language: English

Production
- Executive producer: Lee Mendelson
- Producer: Bill Melendez
- Cinematography: Nick Vasu
- Editors: Roger Donley; Chuck McCann
- Running time: 24 minutes
- Production companies: United Media Productions; Lee Mendelson Film Productions; Bill Melendez Productions

Original release
- Network: CBS
- Release: October 24, 1980

Related
- She's a Good Skate, Charlie Brown (1980); It's Magic, Charlie Brown (1981)

Life is a Circus, Charlie Brown is the 20th prime-time animated television special based upon the comic strip Peanuts, by Charles M. Schulz. It originally aired on the CBS network on October 24, 1980. The special won an Emmy Award in 1981 for Outstanding Animated Program.

The special introduces a new character named Fifi who appears again in The Peanuts Movie.

== Plot ==
Snoopy is lying on top of his doghouse when he hears music. He follows the music and finds a circus unloading. Among other animals, he sees three poodles, and immediately latches onto the white one (whom the audience later learns is named Fifi). Polly, the dog's trainer, sees Snoopy and pulls him inside.

The next day, Peppermint Patty calls Charlie Brown to tell him her school gave all students the day off to see the circus. Charlie Brown tells her that his school will be closed as well, and they decide to attend the circus together. At the circus, the children see Snoopy perform as part of a dog act. They all realize it is Snoopy and eventually relish his new career, despite Snoopy's shortcomings, being completely untrained. However, Charlie Brown insists that Snoopy's career is being his dog. Despite Snoopy making a fool of himself during the performance, Polly's boss tells Polly to include Snoopy in future performances, but is to be given the name Hugo The Great.

Later that night, Charlie Brown realizes Snoopy has not returned. He goes to the circus site in time to see Snoopy enter a boxcar, still following Fifi. The gate of the boxcar slams shut on him, and the circus train pulls away. The next scene involves Snoopy trying to find a good, warm place to fall asleep while the train is in motion. First he tries to lie on the humps of a camel, only to slide off in between both humps each time, then he finds what looks like a bale of hay next to one of the bears, which Snoopy settles into. However, it turns out to be a lion, who wakes up and looks at Snoopy contemptuously. Snoopy wakes up and when he sees the lion looking at him, runs away scared, running over the top of the bear (waking it, but that's all) and ending up stopping when he sees other props on the other side of the car. He decides to lie on top of one box, which turns out to be the saw-a-person-in-half magic trick. He falls into that box and his head and feet appear out the holes in each end.

In the morning, after the circus train arrives at its next call, Polly slowly trains Snoopy to become part of the act. First, he is taught to ride a unicycle first on the ground, then on the high wire. Snoopy also learns to do a backflip, and his performance in the next show is an improvement.

Meanwhile, back home, Lucy has decided to board up the doorway of Snoopy's doghouse and place a sign on it which reads "Premises Condemned". Charlie Brown also recounts to Linus the story of why his parents gave him a pet dog. (This story was also told in the film Snoopy Come Home.)

Polly decides to expand the act by getting Snoopy and Fifi to do a trapeze act. Snoopy takes to the air a little more fearlessly, Fifi is initially scared. Eventually it works out, and at the next show, combined with the backflips and the unicycle ride, they are a major success.

After the show, Polly gives Snoopy and Fifi the good news that they are officially the stars of the circus. However, her boss feels their colors do not fit and wants them both dyed pink. She first wrestles Snoopy into a large vat of food coloring, and after he is completely pink, she goes to do the same to Fifi, but Snoopy jumps between them growling menacingly at her. After Polly shows no fear and tells him basically to get out of her way, Snoopy attacks her and wrestles her into the food coloring until she too is all pink, then jumps out and runs away, taking Fifi with him to the bus stop to return home, but Fifi decides to go back to the circus, then Snoopy sadly boards the bus and returns to Charlie Brown.

Back home, Charlie Brown is awakened by the shower running because Snoopy is washing the pink food coloring off him. Charlie Brown sees him exiting the bathroom but says nothing. Snoopy then makes himself some dinner, still crying over being heartbroken from Fifi. Then he realizes that the circus is her life and his home is his life, and he retreats to his doghouse. Upon seeing what Lucy did to it, he rips up the sign and tears the boards off the house. He goes to bed after illuminating a big blinking neon sign which reads "Hugo The Great".

== Voice cast ==
- Michael Mandy as Charlie Brown
- Brent Hauer as Peppermint Patty
- Casey Carlson as Polly
- Earl "Rocky" Reilly as Linus van Pelt
- Kristen Fullerton as Lucy van Pelt
- Shannon Cohn as Marcie
- Christopher Donohoe as Schroeder
- Bill Melendez as Snoopy

== Home media ==
The special was released on RCA's SelectaVision CED format in 1982. It was one of the first two Peanuts specials released on VHS, on a set release by Media Home Entertainment in June 1984 with You're the Greatest, Charlie Brown. Hi-Tops Video released the special by itself on VHS in 1989.

On January 9, 1996, it was paired with Snoopy's Getting Married, Charlie Brown for a double feature release by Paramount Home Video.

It was also included in the 2015 DVD release, Peanuts: Emmy Honored Collection, as well as the DVD release of It's the Easter Beagle, Charlie Brown in the UK from Firefly Entertainment in 2004. It was later included with the deluxe He's Your Dog, Charlie Brown DVD in the US from Warner Home Video on September 21, 2010.

On October 7, 2025, it was released on the DVD and Blu-Ray collection Peanuts: 75th Anniversary Ultimate TV Specials Collection along with 39 other Peanuts specials.
