= Snoopy's Getting Married, Charlie Brown =

1985 Peanuts television special

- Genre: Animation
- Created by: Charles M. Schulz
- Written by: Charles M. Schulz
- Directed by: Bill Melendez
- Voices of: Brett Johnson; Stacy Ferguson; Dawnn D.Leary; Jeremy Schoenberg; Heather Stoneman; Gini Holtzman; Keri Houlihan; Daniel Colby; Bill Melendez
- Composer: Judy Munsen
- Country of origin: United States
- Original language: English

Production
- Executive producer: Charles M. Schulz
- Camera setup: Nick Vasu
- Running time: 24 minutes
- Production companies: Lee Mendelson Film Productions; Bill Melendez Productions; United Media Productions

Original release
- Network: CBS
- Release: March 20, 1985

Related
- It's Flashbeagle, Charlie Brown (1984); It's Your 20th Television Anniversary, Charlie Brown (1985)

Snoopy's Getting Married, Charlie Brown is the 28th prime-time animated television special based on the comic strip Peanuts by Charles M. Schulz. It was originally aired on the CBS network on March 20, 1985.

== Plot ==
Snoopy is performing guard duty for Peppermint Patty, but gets sidetracked when he meets a beautiful poodle named Genevieve. Soon after, Snoopy decides to get married, and wants his brother Spike to be the Best Beagle at his marriage, resulting in Spike traveling a long way from Needles, California and trying to earn money by competing in a dog race, only to be disqualified for being a beagle and not a greyhound.

Snoopy is at first excited, but soon grows nervous at the prospect of marriage, acting miserable at his own bachelor party, and even breaking down into tears hours before the wedding. At the ceremony, everything is in order, until it seems Genevieve is late. Lucy soon arrives with news that Genevieve fell in love with a golden retriever and ran off with him, meaning that the wedding is off. Snoopy is heartbroken at first, but soon lightens up at the prospect of remaining a bachelor, and enjoys salad with Woodstock. Spike returns home to his residence, a gigantic hollowed-out cactus with electricity and modern amenities, and the show ends by Spike enjoying part of the wedding cake by himself.

== Production ==
Snoopy's Getting Married, Charlie Brown was based on a 1977 comic strip storyline. In the storyline, Snoopy's bride-to-be is never seen, and it is Spike that the bride falls for.

== Voice actors ==
- Brett Johnson as Charlie Brown
- Jeremy Schoenberg as Linus van Pelt
- Stacy Ferguson as Sally Brown and Violet
  - Dawnn D. Leary as Sally Brown's singing voice
- Heather Stoneman as Lucy van Pelt
- Gini Holtzman as Peppermint Patty
- Keri Houlihan as Marcie
- Danny Colby as Schroeder
- Bill Melendez as Snoopy, Woodstock and Spike

Patty and Roy appear in silent roles. Franklin and Pig-Pen were voiced by Carl Steven, but they were not spoken as well.

== Legacy ==
In 2007, artists Gail Robinson and Barbara Rossini created a statue, entitled "Mr. Joe Debonair", depicting Snoopy dressed in a tuxedo akin to his appearance in Snoopy's Getting Married, Charlie Brown. During the time it was up, the statue was located in Santa Rosa, California on 1667 W. Steele lane; it has been kept at the Empire Ice Arena since it was taken down.

== Home media ==
Kartes Video Communications released the special on VHS in 1987. In 1989, the special was released on a double feature VHS with You're in Love, Charlie Brown from the same company. On January 9, 1996, Paramount Home Video released the special on a double feature VHS with Life Is a Circus, Charlie Brown. On June 14, 2011, Warner Home Video released the special on DVD for the first time as part of the compilation Happiness is... Peanuts: Snoopy's Adventures. Warner Home Video would release the special again on September 15, 2015, as part of the Peanuts: Emmy Honored Collection DVD.

On October 7, 2025, it was released on the DVD and Blu-Ray collection Peanuts: 75th Anniversary Ultimate TV Specials Collection along with 39 other Peanuts specials.
