= The Charlie Brown and Snoopy Show =

American animated television series

- Season 1 title card
- Also known as: You're on Nickelodeon, Charlie Brown; The Charlie Brown Show; Snoopy
- Genre: Children's television series; Animation; Variety
- Based on: Peanuts by Charles M. Schulz
- Written by: Charles M. Schulz
- Directed by: Bill Melendez; Phil Roman; Sam Jaimes
- Voices of: See below
- Music by: Desirée Goyette; Ed Bogas
- Opening theme: "Let's Have a Party" sung by Desirée Goyette (season 2)
- Ending theme: "Let's Have a Party" sung by Desirée Goyette (season 2)
- Country of origin: United States
- Original language: English
- No. of seasons: 2
- No. of episodes: 18

Production
- Executive producer: Lee Mendelson
- Producers: Lee Mendelson; Bill Melendez
- Editor: Chuck McCann
- Running time: 23 minutes
- Production companies: Lee Mendelson Film Productions; Bill Melendez Productions

Original release
- Network: CBS
- Release: September 17, 1983 – October 12, 1985

The Charlie Brown and Snoopy Show (known as You're on Nickelodeon, Charlie Brown during reruns on Nickelodeon) is an American animated television series featuring characters and storylines from the Charles M. Schulz comic strip Peanuts as first presented for television in the Peanuts animated specials. It aired Saturday mornings on the CBS network from 1983 to 1985.

Due to lower-than-expected ratings, in an attempt to boost viewership, CBS moved the series to 8:00 a.m. Eastern Time early in 1984. It did not help the ratings much, and while the show was not formally cancelled in 1984, further production was on hiatus, and in 1985, CBS ordered five new episodes for what would be a second and final season. Early in 1986, CBS dropped the show due to the ratings still being below expectations.

The Charlie Brown and Snoopy Show is one of the few television series produced by Bill Melendez, whose animation studio generally produced specials. The series re-aired on Disney Channel from 1993 to 1997, and on Nickelodeon from 1998 to 2000. Both networks ran several Peanuts specials and the This Is America, Charlie Brown miniseries alongside The Charlie Brown and Snoopy Show to increase the available number of episodes. Outside the U.S., the series aired on YTV in Canada by 1996, and on the CBBC block on BBC One and BBC Two from 1986 to 2005. It is available for streaming on Apple TV as of July 10, 2026.

== Cast ==
Typical for an animated Peanuts production, the characters were performed by real children, and there was a large cast turnover between the first and second season due to many of the child actors maturing out of their roles, leaving only Jeremy Schoenberg, Jason Muller and Bill Melendez to remain.

- Brad Kesten (season 1) and Brett Johnson (season 2) as Charlie Brown
- Stacy Heather Tolkin (season 1) and Stacy Ferguson (season 2) as Sally Brown
  - Tolkin also voiced Truffles in season 1
  - Ferguson also voiced Patty in season 2
- Angela Lee (season 1) and Heather Stoneman (season 2) as Lucy van Pelt
  - Stoneman also voiced Eudora in season 2
- Jeremy Schoenberg as Linus van Pelt
  - Schoenberg also voiced Floyd in season 1 and Harold Angel in season 2
- Kevin Brando (season 1) and Danny Colby (season 2) as Schroeder
  - Brando also voiced 5 and Thibault in season 1
- Jason Muller as Rerun van Pelt
- Carl Steven (season 2) as Franklin and Pig-Pen
- Victoria Vargas (season 1) and Gini Holtzman (season 2) as Peppermint Patty
- Michael Dockery (season 1) and Keri Houlihan (season 2) as Marcie
  - Dockery also voiced Shermy in season 1
- Mary Tunnell as Frieda (season 1)
  - Tunnell also voiced Eudora in season 1
- Dana Ferguson as Samantha (season 2)
- Bill Melendez as Snoopy and Woodstock

== Episodes ==
=== Series overview ===
Season	Segments	Episodes	Originally released	
Season	Segments	Episodes	First released	Last released
1	75	13	September 17, 1983	December 10, 1983
2	15	5	September 14, 1985	October 12, 1985

=== Season 1 (1983) ===
No. overall	No. in season	Title	Directed by	Original release date
1	1	"Snoopy's Cat Fight"	Sam Jaimes, Bill Melendez	September 17, 1983
Snoopy throws a basketball into Woodstock's nest but Woodstock is angry and throws it into Snoopy.; Charlie Brown tries to impress The Little Red-Haired Girl.; Sally does reports and Show and Tell.; Peppermint Patty and Charlie Brown are given the same desk after Brown's school is demolished; she starts to annoy Charlie Brown, causing them to get sent to the principal, giving them the assignment to write "I will not create a disturbance in class" 100 times.; Schroeder is not happy when Lucy criticizes Beethoven and his music.; Linus loans his blanket to Eudora, who then gives the blanket to the cat next door.
2	2	"Snoopy: Team Manager"	Phil Roman, Bill Melendez	September 24, 1983
Linus and Snoopy try to help Lucy plant her garden.; Rerun sings and recites poetry while he rides on the back of his mom's bike.; Linus's grandmother is coming so Linus mails his blanket to himself but it does not return.; Snoopy is the new manager of the baseball team.
3	3	"Linus and Lucy"	Sam Jaimes; Phil Roman (sequence)	October 1, 1983
Sally does a report on Snoopy and gets a good grade.; Linus tries to teach Sally to kick the football but it runs out of air while Lucy taunts Charlie Brown to kick the football.; Lucy makes "love beads" for Schroeder.; Lucy does not understand if Schroeder may like her.; Schroeder and Charlie Brown throw a snowball at Linus' head but he spins each snowball with his blanket and throws it to them and Lucy makes snow bunnies.; Charlie Brown tries to fly a kite, but he is unsuccessful.; Lucy tries to take out Snoopy's and Linus' slivers and makes Linus shower her with compliments before she gives him a piece of toast.; Lucy thinks she can see the ocean and hits a home run when Schroeder tells her he will kiss her. Note: Re-used animation and dialogue from It's Arbor Day, Charlie Brown is used.
4	4	"Lucy vs. the World"	Sam Nicholson	October 8, 1983
Charlie Brown and Lucy are drinking lemonade and talking. However, Charlie grows sickened when Lucy does not realize that Snoopy has sipped from the same straw she is using and Lucy is disgusted with the faces he is making.; Charlie Brown has grown fed up with Lucy's incompetence towards the baseball team and kicks her off the team. Lucy badmouths the team through the school paper, and resorts to complaining from the sidelines.; Peppermint Patty stays at Charlie Brown's house while her dad is out of town, mistaking Snoopy's doghouse as a 'guest cottage'.; Snoopy finds himself in the running for the prestigious prize and forces the neighborhood kids to nominate him.; Lucy throws Linus out of the house, only to discover that their Mom has given birth to a baby brother (who was named Rerun van Pelt).
5	5	"Linus' Security Blanket"	Dick Horn with Steven C. Melendez	October 15, 1983
Snoopy thinks the cat next door has got Woodstock. A fight ensues, but it turns out that the cat was playing with a yellow glove and Linus goes over to apologize only to be scratched up himself.; Sally gives the wrong answer in class.; Lucy bothers Schroeder.; Charlie Brown refuses to call the ballgame on account of rain, even though waves form around his pitcher's mound. His pitcher's mound begins moving.; Lucy psycho-analyzes Charlie Brown's personality based on sunrises and sunsets.; Lucy taunts Charlie Brown to kick the football by pretending to fall asleep.; Linus gives Snoopy his blanket, in hopes he can break his habit but then Snoopy makes it into two sports coats for him & Woodstock.; Charlie Brown gets tangled in his kite string and hung upside-down from a tree (which was used in A Charlie Brown Celebration).; Snoopy and Woodstock try to catch an afternoon nap. (This also appeared in the special It's an Adventure, Charlie Brown); Snoopy begins clinging to anyone who believes dogs have made the world a better place. Unfortunately, Charlie Brown gets saddled with the grateful beagle. Then Lucy helps him. Charlie Brown then concludes that girls have made the world a better place. Then Lucy clings to Charlie Brown.
6	6	"Snoopy: Man's Best Friend"	Robert E. Balzer	October 22, 1983
Snoopy tries to kiss Lucy while she is sad.; Snoopy stays with Peppermint Patty but cannot get off her water bed.; Charlie Brown tells Linus about when Snoopy took Woodstock and the Beagle Scouts to camp.; Snoopy blows Linus into Patty's pool after he reads The Three Little Pigs and pretends he is the World War I Flying Ace, Charlie Brown is angry with Snoopy and Sally has a new motto ""Speak softly and carry a beagle"" then changes it into "Speak loudly and carry a beagle".
7	7	"Snoopy the Psychiatrist"	Robert E. Balzer	October 29, 1983
Charlie Brown gets good advice from Lucy the psychiatrist and her replacement Snoopy.; Charlie Brown loses his hat and the kite booms into pieces like a balloon.; Peppermint Patty invites Snoopy to a school dance.; Peppermint Patty has recruited a kid named Thiebault for her baseball team. However, he rudely refuses to return Charlie Brown's baseball glove and angrily rejects the notion that girls should play baseball by insulting Marcie.
8	8	"You Can't Win, Charlie Brown"	Bill Melendez	November 5, 1983
Snoopy demonstrates the shaking method of training puppies when Linus doubts a puppy could learn anything from being shaken. (This short is reused from Charlie Brown Cleans The Air.); Woodstock comments on Snoopy's dinner by discussing worms.; Sally learns of danger by throwing a football into Woodstock's nest.; Charlie Brown and his friends win their first game of the season thanks to Rerun.; Linus offers his burnt toast to Woodstock.; Lucy and Linus make snow sculptures.; Charlie Brown tries to teach Snoopy how to sit and heel.; The school ceiling springs a leak over Peppermint Patty's desk.; Lucy helps Charlie Brown fly his kite and Charlie Brown ends up making the kite get caught in Snoopy's doghouse (This also appeared in the special A Charlie Brown Celebration).; Linus tries to live without his blanket for two weeks.; Sally tries to tell jokes in front of her class. (This also appeared in the special It's an Adventure, Charlie Brown)
9	9	"The Lost Ballpark"	Dick Horn, Steven C. Melendez	November 12, 1983
Lucy tries to 'help' Charlie Brown walk properly.; Peppermint Patty and Marcie go to camp, where Marcie fends off the advancements of a love-struck boy named Floyd who keeps calling her "Lambcake".; Linus and Snoopy go truffle-hunting and find a little girl named Truffles. Soon, Linus and Snoopy begin quarreling over who loves her more.; Charlie Brown is shocked when he discovers he cannot play on the vacant lot used for their ballgames.; Note: The Lost Ballpark introduces Snoopy's brother, Spike.
10	10	"Snoopy's Football Career"	Sam Jaimes, Bill Melendez	November 19, 1983
Peppermint Patty is miserable that she has not received a gold star for her class assignments.; Linus deals with Snoopy's constant filching of his blanket.; Lucy grows tired of Schroeder ignoring her and throws his piano into the kite-eating tree.; Linus, Sally, Snoopy and Woodstock work on learning the game of football and Peppermint Patty teaches Marcie.
11	11	"Chaos in the Classroom"	Robert E. Balzer	November 26, 1983
Sally takes Woodstock's nest for Show and Tell and breaks a kid's ruler when a truck runs over it.; Sally tries to kick the football and Charlie Brown makes a little landing after Lucy pulls the football away. Marcie and Peppermint Patty play football.; Peppermint Patty gets mad when Marcie becomes a traffic patroller.; Linus's blanket attacks Lucy. Note: Rocky Relly voices Linus in this short, as this was a deleted scene from It's an Adventure, Charlie Brown.; Snoopy's dish is used for second base, Charlie Brown tries to teach Lucy to bat and Linus is out of the game.
12	12	"It's That Team Spirit, Charlie Brown"	Sam Jaimes, Bill Melendez	December 3, 1983
Snoopy pretends he is a vulture, leaping from trees.; Snoopy steals Linus's blanket and Linus steals Snoopy's supper dish before they each return each other's respective prized possessions.; Peppermint Patty refuses to go to school and sits on Snoopy's doghouse. Marcie drags her down and breaks Snoopy's doghouse. Marcie then tells Peppermint Patty that Snoopy is a beagle.; Rerun observes the world while he is riding on the back of his mother's bike.; Charlie Brown plays baseball in the rain.
13	13	"Lucy Loves Schroeder"	Dick Horn, Steven C. Melendez	December 10, 1983
Charlie Brown goes to Lucy's psychiatry booth for advice on himself fighting the kite-eating tree.; Snoopy pretends to be the World I Flying Ace and steals Sally's term paper.; Charlie Brown gets sent home from camp for being a troublemaker while Peppermint Patty tells Linus how she cried when she saw the Little Red-Haired Girl.; Lucy breaks up with Schroeder, then washes his toy piano.; After hearing noises at night, Snoopy is terrified to sleep outdoors and can't pay his counselor bill, so Charlie Brown has to complete the task.

=== Season 2 (1985) ===
No. overall	No. in season	Title	Original release date
14	1	"Snoopy and the Giant – Shorts: Snoopy's Foot, Giant, Rerun"	September 14, 1985
Snoopy ends up breaking his paw and has to wear a cast, which causes a problem when Peppermint Patty wants Snoopy to play for her team in the next game and Snoopy has broken another paw.; Woodstock's farming skills cause a beanstalk to sprout into the sky, where he and Snoopy encounter a cookie-hoarding giant.; The youngest Van Pelt child has to deal with an odd jack-in-the-box, his mother's biking skills, and a crush on a girl who keeps changing her name every time he sees her.
15	2	"Snoopy's Brother Spike – Shorts: The Pelicans, Great Pumpkin, Spike"	September 21, 1985
Peppermint Patty recruits Charlie Brown to sell popcorn for her team and wear their team mascot's costume.; Linus, Sally, and Snoopy await The Great Pumpkin's arrival, while Peppermint Patty and Charlie Brown go bowling.; Snoopy's brother Spike comes for a visit and is helped to get in shape to battle the cat next door.
16	3	"Snoopy's Robot – Shorts: Snoopy's Robot, Linus and the Blanket, Friends"	September 28, 1985
The gang visits a computer camp, where Snoopy encounters a high-tech robot.; Linus tries to take Lucy's advice and gives up his blanket.; Both Peppermint Patty and Marcie deal with the fact that they might be in love with Charlie Brown.
17	4	"Peppermint Patty's School Days – Shorts: School Days, Snoopy's Trick, Snoopy's Flight"	October 5, 1985
Peppermint Patty and Marcie deal with the day-to-day issues of attending public school.; Snoopy surprises Linus with his 'Cheshire Beagle' disappearing trick.; Snoopy pilots his doghouse to help Schroeder get to a summer music camp.
18	5	"Sally's Sweet Babboo – Shorts: The Play, Sweet Babboo!, Snoopy's Story"	October 12, 1985
Charlie Brown writes an essay about the previous Christmas, where the entire gang took part in a rather disjointed Christmas play. Some elements from this short would be reused for the 1992 special It's Christmastime Again, Charlie Brown.; The Peanuts gang deals with Valentine's Day and unrequited love.; Peppermint Patty writes a school essay about Snoopy's many exploits.

== Theme song ==
The first season's theme was a Vince Guaraldi styled piano-based instrumental written and produced for this series, which was composed by Desirée Goyette and Ed Bogas. The song was given lyrics and released in 1984 as "Let's Have a Party with Charlie Brown and Snoopy" on the album Flashbeagle, the soundtrack to the special It's Flashbeagle, Charlie Brown. On the second season, a shortened version with the lyrics that appeared on the Flashbeagle album was used.

== Home media ==
In 1987, Kartes Video Communications released the show on VHS in 9 volumes (with titles in the style of normal Peanuts specials), with two episodes each. From 1994 to 2001, Paramount Home Video released the show on VHS and LaserDisc in the same fashion, but under the actual title of the show. On June 14, 2011, Warner Home Video released the 14th episode of the show on DVD under a single disc called: Happiness Is... Peanuts: Snoopy's Adventures. They also announced that on October 18, 2011, the eighteenth and final episode of the show would come to DVD under a single disc called: Happiness Is... Peanuts: Snow Days, the thirteenth episode of the show came to DVD under a single disc called: Happiness Is... Peanuts: Friends Forever on December 27, 2011, and the fifteenth episode of the show came to DVD under a single disc called: Happiness Is... Peanuts: Team Snoopy on May 1, 2012. On October 9, 2012, Happiness Is... Peanuts: Go Snoopy Go! featured the twelfth episode of the show. Also, the entire series is available through iTunes. On January 21, 2014, the first, fourth and eleventh episodes appeared on a single disc DVD called Touchdown Charlie Brown. On November 20, 2012, Warner Bros. released the complete series on DVD in Region 1 via their Warner Archive Collection. Nine episodes are on each of the two-disc set. All episodes have previously been released on DVD in Australia and Germany across two 2-disc box sets.
