= Snoopy =

Peanuts comic strip character

- Peanuts character
- First appearance: October 4, 1950 (comic strip)
- Created by: Charles M. Schulz
- Voiced by: Bill Melendez (1959–2008; 2015 archival recordings used in Peanuts Motion Comics, Snoopy's Grand Adventure, and The Peanuts Movie); Bill Hinnant (1966; You're a Good Man, Charlie Brown); Jim Campbell (1967; You're a Good Man, Charlie Brown); Robert Towers (1985); Cam Clarke (1986–1989); Gerald Paradies (2002); Andy Beall (2011); Dylan Jones (2018–present); Terry McGurrin (2019–present)

In-universe information
- Aliases: Joe Cool; World Famous World War I Flying Ace; The World's Greatest Writer; The World Famous Attorney; The World Famous Tennis Pro
- Species: Dog (Beagle)
- Gender: Male
- Family: Brothers: Spike, Andy, Olaf, Marbles, Rover; Sisters: Belle, Molly; Owners: Charlie Brown, Sally Brown, Lila (previously)

Snoopy is one of the central characters in the comic strip Peanuts by American cartoonist Charles M. Schulz. He also appears in all of the Peanuts films and television specials. Debuting in the strip on October 4, 1950, the original drawings of Snoopy were inspired by Spike, one of Schulz's childhood dogs.

A largely anthropomorphic beagle, Snoopy is nearly the polar opposite of his owner, Charlie Brown: he is capable in multiple areas, quick-witted, imaginative, and independent. Snoopy usually spends his days sleeping flat on top of his doghouse or engaging in flights of fancy. This includes pretending to be a World War I flying ace who is the archenemy of the Red Baron, writing essays and short stories on his typewriter, and trying to romance the different neighborhood kids (with the main object of his affections being Lucy Van Pelt, who is disgusted by him). Snoopy is also known for his large family, rivalry with Linus Van Pelt over the latter's blanket, friendship with Peppermint Patty (who, due to his anthropomorphism, believes him to be a "funny-looking kid with [a] big nose" for years), and longstanding best-friendship with the yellow bird Woodstock.

Though anthropomorphic, Snoopy is incapable of diegetic speech. In the strip, he is given thought bubbles that showcase his inner thoughts, but these are removed in the majority of external media. In the specials, Snoopy's vocal effects were done by series producer Bill Melendez; following Melendez's death, his voice has been used via archival recordings on all subsequent films and specials.

Snoopy is widely considered the franchise's breakout character. He has become one of the most recognizable and iconic comic strip characters of all time, and is considered more famous than Charlie Brown in some countries.

== Traits ==
Snoopy is a loyal, imaginative, and good-natured beagle who is prone to imagining fantasy lives, including being an author, a college student known as "Joe Cool", an attorney, and a World War I flying ace. He is perhaps best known in this last persona, wearing an aviator's helmet and goggles and a scarf while carrying a swagger stick (like a stereotypical British Army officer of World War I and II).

Snoopy can be selfish, gluttonous, and lazy at times, and occasionally mocks his owner, Charlie Brown. But on the whole, he shows great love, care, and loyalty for his owner, even though he cannot even remember his name and always refers to him as "the round-headed kid". In the 1990s comic strips, he is obsessed with cookies, particularly the chocolate-chip variety. This, and other instances in which he indulges in large chocolate-based meals and snacks, indicate that chocolate is not poisonous to Snoopy, the way it is for real dogs.

Snoopy piloting his imaginary World War I "Sopwith Camel" fighter bi-plane, disguised as a doghouse

All of his fantasies have a similar formula. Snoopy pretends to be something, usually "world famous", and fails. His short "novels" are never published. His Sopwith Camel is consistently shot down by his imaginary rival enemy, the German flying ace, the "Red Baron". Schulz said of Snoopy's character in a 1997 interview: "He has to retreat into his fanciful world in order to survive. Otherwise, he leads kind of a dull, miserable life. I don't envy dogs the lives they have to live."

Snoopy imagines himself to speak, but never actually does, other than nonverbal sounds and occasionally uttering "Woof". His very articulate thoughts are shown in thought balloons. In the animated Peanuts films and television specials, Snoopy's thoughts are not verbalized. His moods are instead conveyed through moans, yelps, growls, sobs, laughter, and monosyllabic utterances such as "bleah" or "hey" as well as through pantomime. His vocal effects were usually provided by Bill Melendez, who first played the role during Snoopy's appearances on The Tennessee Ernie Ford Show. The only exceptions are in the animated adaptations of the musicals You're a Good Man, Charlie Brown and Snoopy!!! The Musical, in which Snoopy's thoughts are verbalized by Robert Towers and Cameron Clarke, respectively. His dialogue, however, is not "heard" by the other characters, except Woodstock, the bird, and other non-human characters; however, he does remember Charlie Brown's name.

Snoopy's doghouse defies physics and is shown to be bigger on the inside than the outside.

== History ==
Snoopy appeared on October 4, 1950, two days after the first Peanuts strip. He was one of the four original characters, along with Charlie Brown, Patty, and Shermy. He was named Snoopy for the first time in the November 10 strip.

On March 16, 1952, his thoughts were first shown in a thought balloon. Snoopy first appeared upright on his hind legs on January 9, 1956, when he was shown sliding across a sheet of ice after Shermy and Lucy had first done so. He is first shown sleeping on top of his doghouse rather than inside it on December 12, 1958, and first adopts his World War I Flying Ace persona on October 10, 1965. Snoopy's final appearance in the comic was on February 13, 2000, when he was shown sitting on top of his doghouse typing Schulz's farewell message to his readers.

=== Popularity ===
Snoopy appeared as a character balloon in New York City's Macy's Thanksgiving Day Parade in 1968; the balloon depicted Snoopy in his World War I Flying Ace costume. The beagle has been in almost every parade ever since in different costumes, as an ice skater, a jester (to celebrate the new millennium and the parade's 75th anniversary), with Woodstock riding on his head, and an astronaut.

In Wales, the Dogs Trust and Wild in Arts created a trail called A Dog's Trail which spanned across Cardiff, Caerphilly, and Porthcawl in the spring of 2022. The trail raised money for Dogs Trust to use for dog welfare.

== Relationship with other Peanuts characters ==
=== Charlie Brown ===
Despite his history of conflicted loyalties, his constant disrespect for Charlie Brown, and his inability to remember his name (he refers to him as "that round-headed kid"), Snoopy has shown both love and loyalty to his owner. Charlie Brown would often get irritated at Snoopy's flights of fancy with the comment, "Why can't I have a normal dog like everyone else?" He joins Charlie Brown in walking out of a game of Ha-Ha Herman when Peppermint Patty insults Charlie Brown, unaware that Charlie Brown is within earshot. He also helps Charlie Brown recover his autographed baseball when a bully takes it and challenges Charlie Brown to fight him for it. When Charlie Brown has to stop dedicating himself to making Snoopy happy, Snoopy replies, "Don't worry about it. I was already happy." In The Peanuts Movie, Snoopy remains loyal to Charlie Brown, supporting and caring for him throughout the movie.

In early Peanuts strips, Charlie Brown was not Snoopy's owner (as seen in the February 2, 1951, strip), and it was not made clear who, if anyone, his actual owner was. At various times, it was suggested that he was Patty's or Shermy's dog. Charlie Brown was first portrayed as being responsible for Snoopy in the strips of November 1 and 3, 1955; it was not until September 1, 1958, that Snoopy was specifically said to be Charlie Brown's dog. (In the September 20, 1980, strip, Charlie Brown comments that he once told Snoopy to "stay" and "he never went home".)

In both the early strips and the movie Snoopy Come Home, Charlie Brown says that he got Snoopy after being bullied by another kid. His parents took him to the Daisy Hill Puppy Farm to cheer him up, where he met and bought Snoopy. The special Snoopy's Reunion depicts their first meeting.

=== Lucy ===
Snoopy frequently tries to kiss Lucy on the cheek or nose, which Lucy, who is afraid of dog germs, thoroughly hates. Despite her distaste for doggy kisses, Lucy seems to care for Snoopy: in Snoopy Come Home, Lucy is sad to see him go and is (momentarily) glad when he comes back home. In some strips, Lucy goes to Snoopy for help, such as in the April 16, 1961 strip, wherein a jealous Lucy and Frieda are beating each other up at Schroeder's piano, Lucy ends up winning, and shakes hands with Snoopy in the end, looking slightly injured. Snoopy also commandeers Lucy's psychiatric booth either in her absence or when she ends up being the one needing help. In Snoopy!, Lucy and Snoopy hug each other during the song "If Just One Person".

=== Linus ===
Snoopy often tries to steal Linus's blanket, leading to slapstick fights and wild chases, the latter of which usually involve Snoopy running up, grabbing the blanket in his mouth, then running off with Linus holding on for dear life, and finally swinging Linus and the blanket around and around in a circular motion through the air before letting go, and they both fly off to who-knows-where.

=== Lila ===
Lila was Snoopy's owner before Charlie Brown. Snoopy visits her in the cartoon Snoopy Come Home and struggles to decide whether to stay with Charlie Brown or go back to Lila. Lila quickly persuades him to leave Charlie Brown so Snoopy can live with her again. However, upon arriving at her apartment complex, Snoopy is very relieved to see a "NO DOGS ALLOWED" sign and returns to live with Charlie Brown.

=== Peppermint Patty ===
Peppermint Patty often refers to Snoopy as a "funny-looking kid with a big nose", unaware that he is a beagle. In one instance, she has him serve as her attorney in a case involving the school dress code. In the March 21, 1974, strip, Marcie tells Peppermint Patty that Snoopy is a beagle, finally resulting in her realizing his true identity. Snoopy serves as Peppermint Patty's watchdog several times. She is one of the few girls who does not get disgusted after being kissed by him.

=== Sally Brown ===
Like Lucy, Sally does not care that much for Snoopy and often calls him a stupid beagle. Sally usually complains when her big brother asks her to feed Snoopy whenever he is away from home. While she is still an infant, Sally has a friendly and playful relationship with Snoopy. In later years, Sally occasionally enlists Snoopy's help in school assignments. She even treats him to an ice cream cone (a very tall ice cream cone, with scoops of about a dozen flavors) when Snoopy helps her get an "A" on a report about "Our Animal Friends". In one storyline, Sally uses Snoopy as a "weapon" to help protect her from bullies on the playground (Snoopy barks loudly at anyone who threatens Sally, leading Snoopy to comment, "I feel like a can of mace!"), but this ends in disaster when Snoopy sees an old girlfriend of his and runs off to meet her, abandoning Sally and leaving her to get "slaughtered" by the playground bullies.

=== Schroeder ===
Schroeder does not mind much when Snoopy sits against his toy piano, except when Snoopy dances on top of the piano, much to Schroeder's annoyance. He also sometimes plays with the notes coming from the piano.

=== Rerun van Pelt ===
Rerun, the youngest child character in the strip, plays with Snoopy sometimes. In some strips, Rerun and Snoopy are playing cards with each other, both of them clueless about the rules.

=== Woodstock ===
Woodstock is Snoopy's best friend and sidekick. He is a small, yellow bird of indeterminate species. He speaks in a chirping language that only Snoopy and his other bird friends can understand. In return, the birds somehow understand Snoopy's thoughts. In some strips, Snoopy can be seen telling a joke to Woodstock, and both laugh so hard they end up falling off the doghouse. Woodstock sometimes sleeps on top of Snoopy's nose, such as in one strip where Snoopy says, "Never share your pad with a restless bird".

=== Fifi ===
Fifi is a major love interest of Snoopy, and she appears in Life Is a Circus, Charlie Brown and The Peanuts Movie. In Life Is a Circus, Charlie Brown, Snoopy sees Fifi, a white poodle, at a circus and starts to get attracted to her. He and Fifi do a trapeze act, and afterward, he runs away, taking Fifi with him. Fifi decides to go back to the circus; however, leaving Snoopy heartbroken and forced to return to Charlie Brown. In The Peanuts Movie, Fifi (voiced by Kristin Chenoweth) is a pilot just like Snoopy (being redesigned to be bipedal while still retaining her poodle traits), and together they have interaction via Snoopy's typewriter against the Red Baron. He shows how much he cares for her when he cries at Schroeder's house after she is captured by the Red Baron. Snoopy, Woodstock, and the Beagle Scouts set out on a mission to save her. Eventually, they save her, and she shows her affection to Snoopy.

== Siblings ==
Clockwise from top-left: Andy, Spike, Olaf, Rover, Belle, Molly, Snoopy, and Marbles

In the comic strip, Snoopy has seven siblings. Five appeared at various times in the strip: four brothers, Spike, Andy, Marbles, and Olaf; and one sister, Belle. The two others were never mentioned by name in the comic strip, but the whole family appeared in 1991 television special Snoopy's Reunion, introducing the two unknown siblings, identified in the special as Molly and Rover.

Snoopy having seven siblings was an element of the strip that developed as the strip evolved. Originally described in a June 1959 strip as an "only dog", Snoopy went to a family reunion with several unnamed siblings in a May 1965 sequence, stating that they all spoke different languages and couldn't understand each other. In March 1970, Snoopy wrote in his autobiography that he was one of seven puppies, and the number reached its final count of eight beagles in December 1972.

In a 1987 interview, Schulz said that he felt introducing Snoopy's siblings was a mistake, similar to the introduction of Eugene the Jeep in Thimble Theatre: "I think Eugene the Jeep took the life out of Popeye himself, and I'm sure Segar didn't realize that. I realized it myself a couple of years ago when I began to introduce Snoopy's brothers and sisters. I realized that when I put Belle and Marbles in there, it destroyed the relationship that Snoopy has with the kids, which is a very strange relationship. And these things are so subtle when you're doing them, you can make mistakes and not realize them." Schulz elaborated further in another 1987 interview: "Snoopy had a sister, Belle, whom I discovered I really didn't like. I brought in Spike, and I like Spike a lot. But when I brought another brother in — I thought Marbles would make a great name for a dog — I discovered almost immediately that bringing in other animals took the uniqueness away from Snoopy. So the only other animal character who works now is Spike, as long as Spike stays out in the desert."

=== Spike ===
Spike, Snoopy's older brother who lived in the desert, was the most frequently seen sibling in the strip. He was introduced in the August 13, 1975, strip. He was a recurring character between 1984 and 1988, and was also used in one-off appearances sporadically through the rest of Peanuts history. Spike is named after Charles Schulz's childhood dog.

Spike's appearance is similar to Snoopy's, but he is substantially thinner, has a perpetually sleepy-eyed look, sports long, droopy whiskers that look like a mustache, and wears a fedora. He is called Snoopy's older brother during the first story in which he appears. Spike lives in the middle of a desert near Needles, California, mostly interacting with inanimate saguaro cacti and rocks.

He temporarily became Rerun's dog in I Want a Dog for Christmas, Charlie Brown, and also starred in his own television special, It's the Girl in the Red Truck, Charlie Brown. He was also a main character in Snoopy's Getting Married, Charlie Brown, where he is shown traveling from Needles to visit Snoopy to be the best beagle at his wedding.

A large statue of Spike resides inside the Needles Regional Museum in Needles, California. The Schulz family lived in Needles from 1928 to 1930.

=== Belle ===
Belle is Snoopy's sister, who first appeared in the strip on June 28, 1976. She lives in Kansas City, Missouri with her teenage son, whom Snoopy noted as resembling the Pink Panther. Belle herself bears a strong resemblance to Snoopy, but with longer eyelashes. In addition, she wears a lace collar and sometimes wears a pearl necklace.

Belle only made a few appearances in the strip, but is remembered because of the Belle stuffed animal toys sold in the late 1970s and early 1980s. San Francisco toy merchandiser Determined Productions had the license to make Snoopy plush toys, and they introduced Belle plush after receiving many requests from children who wanted a female "sister" doll.

In 1984, Snoopy and Belle inspired fashion designers around the world, including Lagerfeld, Armani, and de la Renta, to create one-of-a-kind outfits in their honor. Both beagles modeled for the "Snoopy in Fashion" exhibition held that year in Japan. "Snoopy & Belle in Fashion" continues to be exhibited as of 2020. Photographs of the exhibition were collected in a 1988 book, Snoopy in Fashion.

There was another traveling exhibition of Snoopy and Belle plush in outfits made by fashion designers in 1990, as a celebration of the comic strip's fortieth anniversary. This exhibition began in Paris at the Louvre Museum, and then to the Mitsukoshi department store in Tokyo, followed by showings in Los Angeles, New York City, London, Milan, and Madrid. Photographs from this collection were published as Snoopy Around the World.

== Reception ==
Snoopy and Charlie Brown were ranked by TV Guide as the 8th greatest cartoon characters of all time.

Some critics feel that the strip suffered a decline in quality after the 1960s. Writing in 2000, Christopher Caldwell argued that the character of Snoopy, and the strip's increased focus on him in the 1970s, "went from being the strip's besetting artistic weakness to ruining it altogether". Caldwell felt that Snoopy "was never a full participant in the tangle of relationships that drove Peanuts in its Golden Age", as he could not talk. He went on to say that Snoopy "was way too shallow for the strip as it developed in the 1960s, and the strips he featured in were anomalies."

Jim Davis noted that Snoopy was a boon from a marketing standpoint, which inspired him to center his comic strip Garfield around a cat: "Snoopy is very popular in licensing. Charlie Brown is not."

A toy titled The Snoopy Snowcone Machine was popular in the '80s and was later recreated in the 2010s by Cra-z-art.

=== Political endorsement controversy ===
On October 5, 2024, a fan account devoted to Snoopy on Twitter posted an endorsement of Donald Trump's presidential candidacy in the 2024 U.S. presidential race. The tweet, which featured an AI-generated portrait of Snoopy shaking the hand of Trump, was widely criticized by many fellow Peanuts fans on social media, several of whom referenced a 1970 letter from creator Schulz in which he stressed the importance of faith in American democracy, writing that "sometimes it is the very people who cry out the loudest in favor of getting back to what they call 'American Virtues' who lack this faith in our country. I believe that our greatest strength lies always in the protection of our smallest minorities." The account deleted the tweet, then did another which acknowledged the support from Trump supporters, and championed continued voter registration in swing states. The account was deactivated shortly thereafter.

The tweet was parodied on the October 12, 2024 edition of the NBC variety show Saturday Night Live, with remarks that, in turn, used the character of Franklin to reference Trump's own controversial comments about Haitian immigrants.

== Awards and honors ==
Schulz was a keen bridge player, and Peanuts occasionally included bridge references. In 1997 the American Contract Bridge League (ACBL) awarded both Snoopy and Woodstock the honorary rank of Life Master, and Schulz was delighted.

On November 2, 2015, Snoopy was honored with a star on the Hollywood Walk of Fame, becoming the second Peanuts-related figure to be inducted with a star, after Schulz.

== In aviation and space ==
=== Use by NASA ===
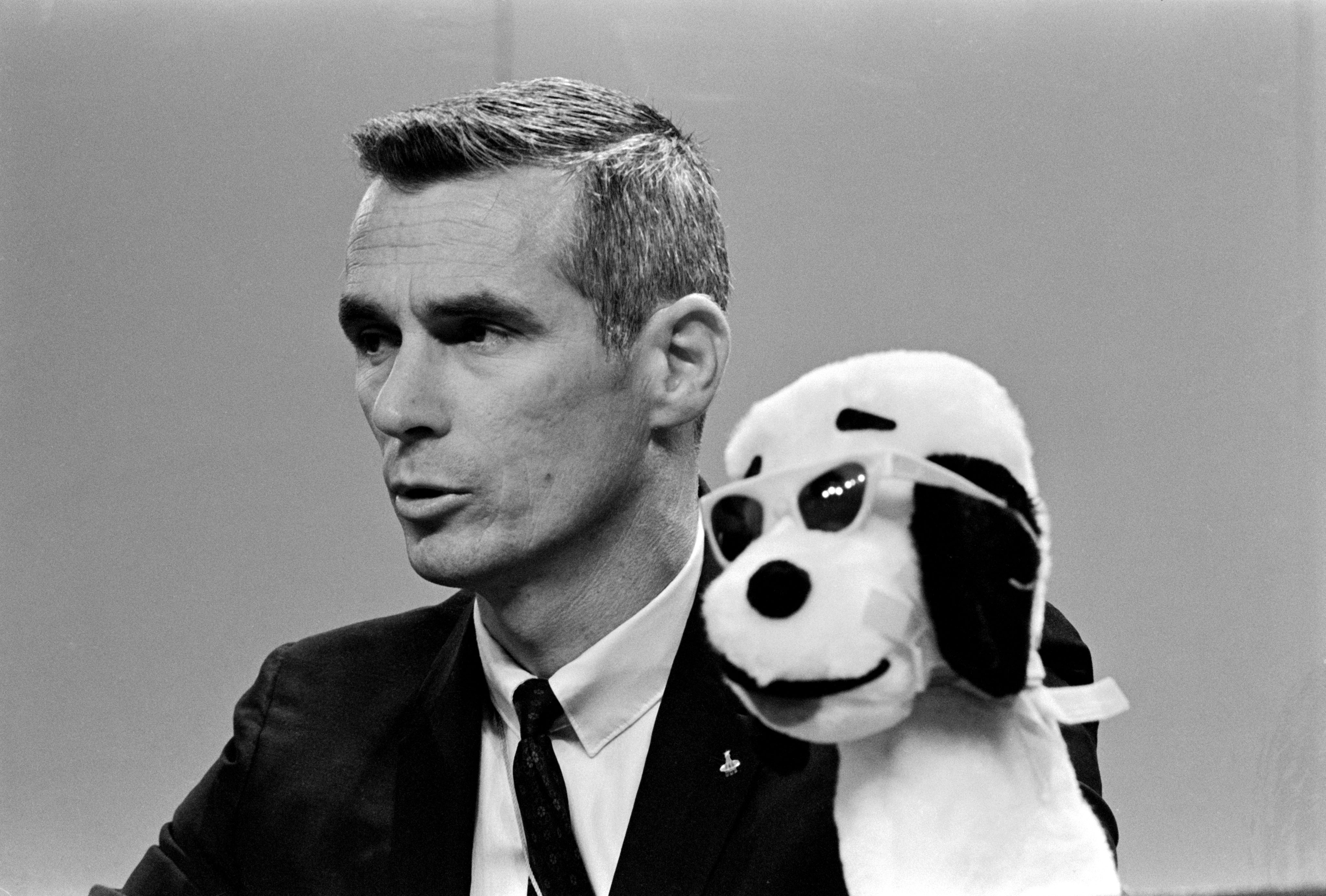
Apollo 10 astronaut Gene Cernan with a Snoopy puppet at a news conference, 1969

- Following the Apollo 1 fire, Snoopy became the official mascot of aerospace safety, testing and the rebuilding of the Apollo Program.
- The Apollo 10 lunar module was named Snoopy and the command module Charlie Brown. While not included in the official mission logo, Charlie Brown and Snoopy became semi-official mascots for the mission, as seen here and here. Schulz also drew some special mission-related artwork for NASA, and several regular strips related to the mission, one showing Snoopy en route to the Moon atop his doghouse with a fishbowl on his head for a helmet. "We have mentioned," wrote television producer Lee Mendelson, "that Charles Schulz is a gambler, a man who doesn't sit pat on success. The New York Times headlined: 'Creator of Peanuts Tempts Fate on Apollo Mission.' Certainly, if a tragedy had occurred, as well it might have, the symbols would forever remain in man's mind as symbols of disaster. But Sparky has always had faith in the Apollo program, from the very start, and he felt if those men could risk their lives, the least he could do would be to risk the popularity of the characters." The strip that ran on July 21, 1969 – one day after Neil Armstrong and Buzz Aldrin landed the Apollo 11 Lunar Module Eagle on the Moon – included a full Moon in the background, with a black mark on it representing the module.
- The fabric cap worn by NASA astronauts as part of the Extravehicular Mobility Unit is known as a "Snoopy cap", a reference to how the white crown and brown earflaps of the cap resemble Snoopy's fur and ears.
- Snoopy is also seen in the mission patch of NASA's Skylab Medical Experiment Altitude Test (SMEAT).
- The Silver Snoopy award is a special NASA honor, in the form of a sterling silver pin with an engraving of Snoopy in a spacesuit helmet. It is given by an astronaut to someone who works in the space program that has gone above and beyond in pursuit of quality and safety.
- In April 2019, Snoopy and NASA announced that Snoopy would return to the Moon aboard NASA Orion in 2024.
- He was a zero-gravity indicator aboard Artemis 1 mission that orbited the moon in 2022.
- In November 2019, Apple TV made a Snoopy in Space series.

=== Other uses ===
- Snoopy is the name of a United States Air Force B-58 Hustler bomber, serial number 55-0665, which was modified to test a radar system.
- American insurance company MetLife used Snoopy as its corporate mascot between 1985 and 2016. Snoopy One, Snoopy Two, and Snoopy J are three airships owned and operated by MetLife that provide aerial coverage of sporting events, and feature Snoopy as the World War I flying ace on their fuselage. As of October 20, 2016, MetLife no longer features Snoopy in its commercials, due to a global rebranding.
- The Charles M. Schulz–Sonoma County Airport in California, named after Schulz, has a logo featuring Snoopy in his World War I flying ace attire flying atop his doghouse.
- Snoopy is the mascot of the 26th Squadron (Barons, pronounced Barones) of the United States Air Force Academy, appearing on their squadron patch.
