= Sally Brown =

Peanuts comic strip character

- Peanuts character
- Sally in the Sunday comics strips, where she had a pink polka-dot dress.
- First appearance: May 26, 1959 (birth and first mention); August 23, 1959 (official debut)
- Created by: Charles M. Schulz
- Voiced by: Cathy Steinberg (1963–1968); Hilary Momberger (1969–1973); Erin Sullivan (1969); Lynn Mortensen (1974–1975); Gail M. Davis (1975–1977); Annalisa Bortolin (1977–1980); Cindi Reilly (1980–1982, 1983); Stacy Heather Tolkin (1983); Stacy Ferguson (1984–1986); Dawnn D. Leary (1985); Tiffany Reinbolt (1985); Elizabeth Lyn Fraser (1986); Ami Foster (1986, 1988); Christina Lange (1988); Brittany M. Thornton (1988–1989); Adrienne Stiefel (1990); Kaitlyn Walker (1991); Mindy Ann Martin (1992); Jamie Hendy (1994); Danielle Keaton (1995, 1997); Ashley Edner (2000); Nicolette Little (2002); Megan Taylor Harvey (2002–2003); Hannah Leigh Dworkin (2003); Olivia Dunford (2006); Sierra Marcoux (2006); Katie Fischer (2006); Claire Corlett (2008–2009); Amanda Pace (2011); Mariel Sheets (2015); Emma Yarovinsky (2016); Taylor Autumn Bertman (2016); Sara J. Gosselin (2018–2019); Hattie Kragten (2019–present)

In-universe information
- Gender: Female
- Family: Charlie Brown (older brother); Unnamed parents; Silas Brown (paternal grandfather); Unnamed uncle; Unnamed paternal grandmother; Snoopy (Dog)
- Nationality: American

Sally Brown is a fictional character in the comic strip Peanuts by Charles Schulz. She is the younger sister of main character Charlie Brown. She was first mentioned in May 1959 and throughout a long series of strips before her first appearance in August 1959. Cathy Steinberg was the first to voice Sally in 1965 for the CBS special A Charlie Brown Christmas; she was five years old at the time.

== History ==
Sally was born on May 26, 1959, with Charlie Brown receiving a telephone call from the hospital and dashing out of the house yelling that he had a new baby sister. She was given the name "Sally" on June 2, 1959. Although Sally was often talked about and was the cause for a celebration that included Charlie Brown passing out chocolate cigars, it was not until August 23, 1959, that she finally made her first appearance in the strip.

Like other characters, such as Linus and Schroeder (who were also introduced to the strip as babies), Sally grew up quickly. The week of August 22, 1960, she took her first steps, and developed a lasting crush on Linus.

Sally went to kindergarten for the first time in a three-week sequence from August 20 to September 7, 1962.

It was originally Linus who expressed a possible romantic interest in Sally. In a strip appearing shortly after Sally's birth, Linus is seen scribbling calculations on a fence. When Charlie Brown wanders by, Linus asks him, "When I'm 22 and Sally is 17, do you think she'll go out with me?"

In a storyline which began on November 29, 1965, Sally was diagnosed with amblyopia ex anopsia (lazy eye) which required her to wear an eye patch for a while.

In September 1974, Sally started talking to her school building, expressing her fears and concerns about going to school. The building would answer back in thought bubbles, although Schulz's intention was that Sally could not hear these replies.

== Character profile ==
Sally has short blonde hair that rises upwards, as well as a tuft of curly hair just above her forehead which occasionally has a bow in it. She wears a dress with small black polka dots, which alternatively is colored either pink or light blue.

Sally is younger than most of the other kids in the series, and thus has very few friends her exact age. Because of her youth, she often has a greater sense of naïveté and dimwittedness, and tends to get mixed up over the smallest things (for example, assuming the phrase “Santa and his reindeer” was actually “Santa and his Rain Gear”).

Like the other kids, Sally sometimes looks down on her older brother, Charlie Brown. At the same time though, she admires him greatly as her sibling and often goes to him for advice. Charlie Brown, meanwhile, loves her greatly but is often exasperated at her eccentricities and lack of intelligence.

Besides her brother, her other most significant relationship is with Linus Van Pelt. Sally has an infatuation with Linus that she does not hide, often referring to him as “My Sweet Babboo” and trying to make the claim that the two are already in a relationship, usually with cartoon hearts forming around her. Linus, meanwhile, is overwhelmed and at times angered by this, usually yelling her down or hiding from her under his blanket, to no avail.

== Portrayals ==
Cathy Steinberg was the first to voice Sally Brown in A Charlie Brown Christmas in 1965. Various actresses have voiced her since. Linda Jenner voiced her from It's a Mystery, Charlie Brown (1974) to Be My Valentine, Charlie Brown (1975). In It's Flashbeagle, Charlie Brown (1984), Snoopy's Getting Married, Charlie Brown (1985), and the 1983 season of The Charlie Brown and Snoopy Show, Sally was voiced by Fergie.

Other voice actresses who have played Sally include:

- Cathy Steinberg (1965–1967)
- Hilary Momberger (1969, 1971–1973)
- Erin Sullivan (1969)
- Lynn Mortensen (1974–1975)
- Gail Davis (1975–1977)
- Annalisa Bortolin (1980)
- Cindi Reilly (1981–1983)
- Stacy Heather Tolkin (1983)
- Stacy Ferguson (1984–1985)
- Tiffany Reinbolt (1985)
- Elizabeth Lyn Fraser (1986)
- Ami Foster (1988)
- Christina Lange (1988)
- Brittany Thornton (1988–1989)
- Adrienne Stiefel (1990)
- Kaitlyn Walker (1991)
- Mindy Ann Martin (1992)
- Jamie Hendy (1994)
- Danielle Keaton (1995–1997)
- Ashley Edner (2000)
- Nicolette Little (2002)
- Megan Taylor Harvey (2002–2003)
- Hanna Leigh Dworkin (2003)
- Sierra Marcoux (2006)
- Claire Corlett (2008)
- Amanda Pace (2011)
- Mariel Sheets (2015)
- Emma Yarovinsky (2016)
- Taylor Autumn Bertman (2016)
- Sara J. Gosselin (2018–2019)
- Hattie Kragten (2019–2025)
- Grace Nicoloau-Wood (2026–present)

Kristin Chenoweth played Sally in the Broadway revival of the musical You're a Good Man, Charlie Brown, winning the Tony Award for Best Featured Actress. The character of Sally had not been in the original production of You're a Good Man, Charlie Brown. In the revival Sally replaced Patty (not to be confused with the later character Peppermint Patty) who had long since disappeared from the comic strip. Sally was most recently played by Milly Shapiro in the 2016 revival of You're a Good Man Charlie Brown.
