= Lee Mendelson =

American animation producer (1933–2019)

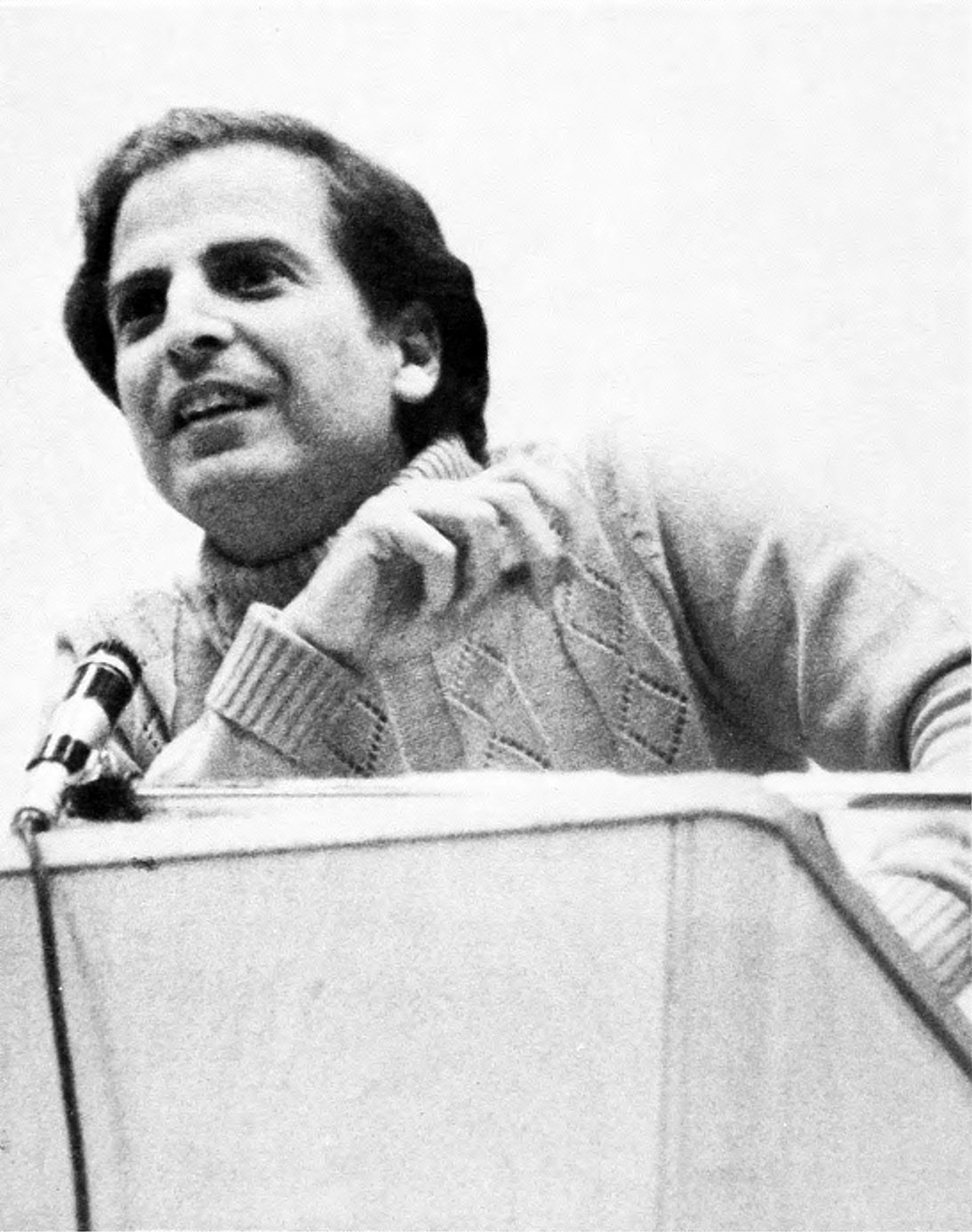
- Mendelson in 1974
- Born: Leland Maurice Mendelson; March 24, 1933; San Francisco, California, U.S.
- Died: December 25, 2019 (aged 86); Hillsborough, California, U.S.
- Education: Stanford University
- Occupation: Television producer
- Years active: 1961–2019
- Known for: Executive producer of Peanuts animated specials
- Spouse: Debbie Mendelson (divorced) Barbara Claire Thompson (m. 1953; div. 1972) Ploenta Inthapruksa (m. 2003)
- Children: 4; including Lynda

Leland Maurice Mendelson (March 24, 1933 – December 25, 2019) was an American television producer of more than 100 programs, including A Charlie Brown Christmas (1965) and additional Peanuts specials. He won four Peabody Awards and 12 Emmy Awards with his company, Lee Mendelson Film Productions.

== Early life and education ==
Mendelson was born in San Francisco on March 24, 1933. He grew up in San Mateo and graduated from San Mateo High School. In 1954 graduated from Stanford University with a degree in English. He then served for three years as a lieutenant in the Air Force. He worked several years for his father, a vegetable grower and shipper.

== Career ==
In 1961, Mendelson began his television career by creating public service announcements for KPIX-TV in San Francisco. A fortunate find of some antique film footage of the 1915 San Francisco World's Fair led him to produce his first documentary, The Innocent Fair, a program covering local history. It led to a series, San Francisco Pageant, for which Mendelson won a Peabody Award.

He left KPIX in 1963 to form his own television and film production company, Lee Mendelson Film Productions, based in Burlingame, California. His first work was a documentary on Willie Mays, A Man Named Mays, which aired nationally on NBC.

=== Peanuts ===
Mendelson saw a Peanuts comic strip about Charlie Brown's baseball team and figured that since he had just "done the world's greatest baseball player, now [he] should do the world's worst baseball player, Charlie Brown." Peanuts creator Charles Schulz, who had enjoyed the Willie Mays program, eagerly agreed to the documentary, marking the start to a 30-year collaboration. The documentary, completed in 1963 and titled A Boy Named Charlie Brown, went unaired because Mendelson failed to find a network.

"Originally nobody wanted [A Charlie Brown Christmas]. All three networks turned it down as did the major advertising agencies and sponsors. I was going nuts. I knew we had something here — everybody loves Charles Schultz’s strip. It was already 15 years old and had been on the cover of Time magazine.

— Lee Mendelson

The Coca-Cola Company approached Mendelson about creating an animated Christmas special, which led to the production of A Charlie Brown Christmas. Schultz recommended the animator and director of the program, Bill Melendez, after previously collaborating on Peanuts-themed Ford advertisements; Mendelson hired jazz composer Vince Guaraldi after hearing his jazz song "Cast Your Fate to the Wind" while driving across the Golden Gate Bridge. Mendelson sketched the lyrics to what would become the opening number, Christmas Time is Here, on a napkin in about 15 minutes and had a nearby church choir record it.

After a hurried six-month production period, A Charlie Brown Christmas aired December 9, 1965 on CBS. The show won both an Emmy and a Peabody award and was the first of over 40 animated Peanuts specials created by Mendelson, Melendez and Schulz. In addition they collaborated on The Charlie Brown and Snoopy Show, which ran on Saturday mornings during the 1980s.

"Coca-Cola called on a Thursday and said, 'We’re looking for a new Christmas special.' I lied and said we’d been working on one for months."

— Mendelson, recalling the origin of A Charlie Brown Christmas (1999)

=== Additional work ===
Mendelson went on to produce more than 100 television specials dealing with topics such as unbelievable human feats and cartoon history, as well as characters including Garfield the cat and Babar the Elephant. His 1968 documentary, Travels with Charley, was based upon the book by John Steinbeck.

"Gentleness is a quality that is seldom understood by television..."

— Peabody Awards citation for A Charlie Brown Christmas (1965)

Mendelson Productions has won 12 Emmys and four Peabodys, as well as numerous Grammy, Emmy, and Oscar nominations.

== Personal life ==
Mendelson lived in Burlingame, California, which he jokingly declared to be "Entertainment Capital of the World" despite its distance from other film and television companies. He said, "I feel not being in Hollywood of New York gives me a better idea of what the people want." Mendelson criticized the television industry for being too geographically concentrated, and felt that the greatest problem facing aspiring TV filmmakers was the "creativity against the corporate structure".

When asked if he read newspaper comics, Mendelson said he "hasn't got time". His family included his wife, Ploenta, and his four children, including actress Lynda Mendelson. He had a stepson and eight grandchildren.

Mendelson died from lung cancer on December 25, 2019, Christmas Day, at his home in Hillsborough, California.
