= It Was My Best Birthday Ever, Charlie Brown =

1997 direct-to-video special directed by Bill Melendez

- Genre: Animated telelvsion special
- Created by: Charles M. Schulz
- Written by: Charles M. Schulz
- Directed by: Bill Melendez
- Voices of: Steven Hartman; Anthony Burch; Jamie Cronin; Danielle Keaton; Brandon Taylor; Bill Melendez; Megan Ellis
- Theme music composer: Vince Guaraldi
- Opening theme: "Rollerblading"
- Ending theme: "Rollerblading"
- Composers: Vince Guaraldi; David Benoit
- Country of origin: United States
- Original language: English

Production
- Executive producers: Lee Mendelson; Jean MacCurdy
- Running time: 24 minutes
- Production companies: United Media; Bill Melendez Productions; Lee Mendelson Film Productions

Original release
- Release: August 5, 1997

Related
- You're in the Super Bowl, Charlie Brown (1994); Good Grief, Charlie Brown: A Tribute to Charles Schulz (2000)

It Was My Best Birthday Ever, Charlie Brown is the 38th animated television special based on characters from the Charles M. Schulz comic strip Peanuts. It is one of two direct-to-video Peanuts specials that have yet to air on U.S. television.

== Plot ==
The special begins with Linus roller-skating all over town. On his way back from a birthday party, he passes by a garden where he hears someone singing ("O Mio Babbino Caro"). As he enters the garden, he learns that a little girl named Mimi is the person that was singing. After Linus and Mimi spend time gardening together, Linus invites her to his birthday party, and she accepts the invitation.

Linus keeps hearing Mimi's singing voice everywhere he goes and can't seem to stop thinking about her. As Linus is writing his guest list for his birthday party, Lucy asks who Mimi is. After Linus tells her, Lucy thinks that it's ridiculous that Linus is inviting a girl that he just met and thinks Mimi will not show up, but Linus is positive that she will.

On the day of Linus' birthday party, Linus wonders where Mimi could be. Lucy and Sally bring out Linus' birthday cake and light the candles, and everybody starts singing "Happy Birthday" to him. Linus tries to get them to stop, but to no avail. As soon as everybody finishes singing, Linus hears Mimi singing "Happy Birthday" from outside. After Mimi finishes singing to Linus, she gives him a flower and a kiss. At first, Linus is sad when Mimi has to leave, but he later starts dancing along with everyone else.

The end of the special shows Linus talking to Charlie Brown about if he'll ever see Mimi again and Woodstock shows up, whistling the song that Mimi sang.

== Cast ==
- Steven Hartman as Charlie Brown
- Anthony Burch as Linus van Pelt
- Jamie Cronin as Lucy van Pelt/Mimi
- Danielle Keaton as Sally Brown
- Brandon Taylor as Pig-Pen
- Megan Ellis as Birthday Girl
- Bill Melendez as Snoopy/Woodstock
- Cathy Cavadini as Mimi's singing voice (uncredited)

Marcie, Shermy, Franklin, Clara (who Linus accidentally called Patty) and Frieda appear but do not have dialogue.

== Production ==
It Was My Best Birthday Ever, Charlie Brown was one of the final television specials completed during creator Charles M. Schulz's lifetime (along with the next special It's the Pied Piper, Charlie Brown). He died in February 2000. It was the last to be released while he was still alive, with It's the Pied Piper Charlie Brown eventually being released in September 2000.

This was also the first Peanuts special to be animated using digital ink and paint (although the backgrounds are still done in the classic hand-painted style of the 1960s–90s specials.)

The song Mimi sings when Linus meets her is the "O mio babbino caro" ("Oh my dear Papa") soprano aria from the 1918 opera Gianni Schicchi by Giacomo Puccini. It was featured on several other Peanuts specials.
