= List of Walt Disney anthology television series episodes (seasons 30–present) =

== The Disney Sunday Movie episodes ==
=== Season 30 (1986) ===
| No. overall | No. in season | Title | Original release date | U.S. viewers (millions) |
|---|---|---|---|---|
| 651 | 1 | Help Wanted: Kids | February 2, 1986 | 15.7 |
This is the first episode under the title The Disney Sunday Movie which aired on ABC. The film featured here is an original film for the program. First episode with CEO Michael Eisner as host. First episode after the revival of the Anthology series and first episode in the second run of the anthology series.
| 652 | 2 | Time Flyer | February 9, 1986 | 15.5 |
This is the television version of The Blue Yonder.
| 653 | 3 | Disney's DTV Valentine | February 14, 1986 | 16.1 |
| 654 | 4 | The Last Electric Knight / 2½ Dads | February 16, 1986 | 15.1 |
A double feature of two hour-long movies.
| 655 | 5 | The Girl Who Spelled Freedom | February 23, 1986 | 15.2 |
| 656 | 6 | The Undergrads | March 2, 1986 | 12.1 |
Originally produced for The Disney Channel in 1985.
| 657 | 7 | The Richest Cat in the World | March 9, 1986 | 14.5 |
| 658 | 8 | Winnie the Pooh and the Honey Tree | March 16, 1986 | 14.7 |
A 1-hour presentation, consisting of the 1966 featurette and 2 Donald Duck and Chip 'n' Dale cartoons. Originally Robin Hood was supposed to be shown on that day, but was postponed and rescheduled to Episode 12 due to an ABC News Special Report on a scheduled speech by President Ronald Reagan about the situation in Nicaragua and Central America at 8:00 PM (ET).
| 659 | 9 | Disney Goes to the Oscars | March 23, 1986 | 10.4 |
A 1-hour presentation. A look back on Disney's reach history of films both live-action and animated.
| 660 | 10 | I-Man | April 6, 1986 | 14.4 |
| 661 | 11 | A Fighting Choice | April 13, 1986 | 12.8 |
| 662 | 12 | Mr. Boogedy | April 20, 1986 | 12.4 |
| 663 | 13 | Robin Hood | April 27, 1986 | 11.4 |
Animated film.
| 664 | 14 | Love Leads the Way | May 4, 1986 | 11.0 |
Originally produced for The Disney Channel in 1984.
| 665 | 15 | Young Again | May 11, 1986 | 12.4 |
A D-TV music video was shown before the feature. This stars Lindsay Wagner and introduces a young Keanu Reeves.
| 666 | 16 | Fuzzbucket / The Deacon Street Deer | May 18, 1986 | 10.6 |
A double feature of two hour-long movies.
| 667 | 17 | Disneyland Summer Vacation Party | May 23, 1986 | 10.1 |
| 668 | 18 | Casebusters / My Town | May 25, 1986 | 9.5 |
A double feature of two hour-long movies.

==== Disney Summer Classics (1986) ====
| No. overall | No. in season | Title | Original release date | U.S. viewers (millions) |
|---|---|---|---|---|
| 669 | 1 | Old Yeller | June 8, 1986 | 10.7 |
Originally released theatrically in 1957, the feature was followed by a behind-the-scenes look at The Great Mouse Detective and a preview of upcoming Summer Classics.
| 670 | 2 | The Apple Dumpling Gang | June 15, 1986 | 9.8 |
Originally released theatrically in 1975
| 671 | 3 | Candleshoe | June 22, 1986 | 9.2 |
Originally released theatrically in 1977
| 672 | 4 | On Vacation with Mickey Mouse and Friends | June 29, 1986 | 9.7 |
A 1-hour presentation. Originally aired as On Vacation in 1956. Animated episode
| 673 | 5 | Kidnapped | July 13, 1986 | 7.7 |
Originally released theatrically in 1960
| 674 | 6 | Donald Duck Quacks Up | July 20, 1986 | 10.2 |
A 1-hour presentation. Originally aired as Kids is Kids in 1961. Animated episode
| 675 | 7 | Herbie Rides Again | July 27, 1986 | 12.7 |
Originally released theatrically in 1974
| 676 | 8 | Disney's DTV Romancin' | September 7, 1986 | 9.3 |
| 677 | 9 | Dumbo | September 14, 1986 | N/A |
Originally released theatrically in 1941. Animated film. Rebroadcast.

=== Season 31 (1986–1987) ===
| No. overall | No. in season | Title | Original release date | U.S. viewers (millions) |
|---|---|---|---|---|
| 678 | 1 | Pete's Dragon | September 21, 1986 | 12.1 |
Originally released theatrically in 1977; Live-action/animated film
| 679 | 2 | Hero in the Family | September 28, 1986 | 12.0 |
| 680 | 3 | Little Spies | October 5, 1986 | 12.6 |
| 681 | 4 | The B.R.A.T. Patrol | October 26, 1986 | 14.4 |
| 682 | 5 | Ask Max | November 2, 1986 | 11.8 |
Stars Jeff Cohen of The Goonies fame.
| 683 | 6 | Walt Disney World's 15th Anniversary Celebration | November 9, 1986 | 14.3 |
| 684 | 7 | The Leftovers | November 16, 1986 | 14.4 |
| 685 | 8 | The Thanksgiving Promise | November 23, 1986 | 15.8 |
| 686 | 9 | Disney's Fluppy Dogs | November 27, 1986 | 5.3 |
| 687 | 10 | Sunday Drive | November 30, 1986 | 14.5 |
| 688 | 11 | The Christmas Toy | December 6, 1986 | 10.7 |
| 689 | 12 | Swiss Family Robinson | December 7, 1986 | 15.0 |
Originally released theatrically in 1960
| 690 | 13 | The Christmas Star | December 14, 1986 | 14.7 |
| 691 | 14 | Mickey's Christmas Carol | December 15, 1986 | 17.1 |
Rebroadcast episode
| 692 | 15 | Tiger Town / Star Tours | December 28, 1986 | 8.9 |
| 693 | 16 | Herbie Goes Bananas | January 11, 1987 | 14.9 |
Originally released theatrically in 1980
| 694 | 17 | Great Moments in Disney Animation | January 18, 1987 | 12.8 |
Discussion of great moments in Disney animation. Clips from various classic animated features and shorts are shown. All-new animated opening sequence.
| 695 | 18 | Double Switch | January 25, 1987 | 8.3 |
| 696 | 19 | You Ruined My Life | February 1, 1987 | 14.1 |
Stars Soleil Moon Frye and Paul Reiser
| 697 | 20 | The Liberators | February 8, 1987 | 10.7 |
As The Disney Sunday Movie debut 1st anniversary
| 698 | 21 | Disney's DTV "Doggone" Valentine | February 13, 1987 | 13.4 |
| 699 | 22 | The Parent Trap II | February 22, 1987 | 16.5 |
| 700 | 23 | Bigfoot | March 8, 1987 | 14.2 |
| 701 | 24 | Young Harry Houdini | March 15, 1987 | 11.9 |
Stars Will Wheaton
| 702 | 25 | Bedknobs and Broomsticks | March 22, 1987 | 13.4 |
Originally released theatrically in 1971; live-action/animated film
| 703 | 26 | Down and Out with Donald Duck | March 25, 1987 | 14.0 |
| 704 | 27 | Double Agent | March 29, 1987 | 11.0 |
| 705 | 28 | Bride of Boogedy | April 12, 1987 | 9.2 |
| 706 | 29 | The Devil and Max Devlin | April 26, 1987 | 9.5 |
Originally released theatrically in 1981
| 707 | 30 | Mary Poppins | May 3, 1987 | 15.9 |
Originally released theatrically in 1964; live-action/animated film
| 708 | 31 | The North Avenue Irregulars | May 10, 1987 | 7.0 |
Originally released theatrically in 1979
| 709 | 32 | Spot Marks the X | May 17, 1987 | 8.8 |
| 710 | 33 | Down the Long Hills | May 24, 1987 | 10.4 |
| 711 | 34 | An All New Adventure of Disney's Sport Goofy | May 27, 1987 | 10.6 |
| 712 | 35 | The Wind in the Willows | July 5, 1987 | 6.9 |
| 713 | 36 | Disney's Fluppy Dogs | August 30, 1987 | 9.0 |
Rebroadcast episode

=== Season 32 (1987–1988) ===
| No. overall | No. in season | Title | Original release date | U.S. viewers (millions) |
|---|---|---|---|---|
| 714 | 1 | Alice in Wonderland | September 27, 1987 | 10.4 |
Originally released theatrically in 1951; animated film; first rebroadcast in over 20 years
| 715 | 2 | The Journey of Natty Gann (Part 1) | October 4, 1987 | 10.2 |
Originally released theatrically in 1985
| 716 | 3 | The Journey of Natty Gann (Part 2) | October 11, 1987 | 11.3 |
Originally released theatrically in 1985
| 717 | 4 | The Return of the Shaggy Dog (Part 1) | November 1, 1987 | 10.7 |
| 718 | 5 | The Return of the Shaggy Dog (Part 2) | November 8, 1987 | 10.1 |
| 719 | 6 | Winnie the Pooh and Tigger Too | November 15, 1987 | 13.1 |
Originally released theatrically in 1974; animated featurette; rebroadcast
| 720 | 7 | Student Exchange (Part 1) | November 29, 1987 | 11.4 |
| 721 | 8 | Mickey's Christmas Carol | December 4, 1987 | 13.7 |
Rebroadcast episode from season 31.
| 722 | 9 | Student Exchange (Part 2) | December 6, 1987 | 10.2 |
| 723 | 10 | A Muppet Family Christmas | December 16, 1987 | 19.3 |
| 724 | 11 | Not Quite Human (Part 1) | December 20, 1987 | 11.4 |
| 725 | 12 | Not Quite Human (Part 2) | December 27, 1987 | 11.1 |
| 726 | 13 | Flight of the Navigator (Part 1) | January 3, 1988 | 13.7 |
Originally released theatrically in 1986
| 727 | 14 | Flight of the Navigator (Part 2) | January 10, 1988 | 14.6 |
Originally released theatrically in 1986
| 728 | 15 | Earth Star Voyager (Part 1) | January 17, 1988 | 11.0 |
| 729 | 16 | Earth Star Voyager (Part 2) | January 24, 1988 | 11.1 |
| 730 | 17 | Rock 'n' Roll Mom | February 7, 1988 | 13.6 |
| 731 | 18 | 14 Going on 30 (Part 1) | March 6, 1988 | 9.3 |
| 732 | 19 | 14 Going on 30 (Part 2) | March 13, 1988 | 8.8 |
| 733 | 20 | Down and Out with Donald Duck | April 29, 1988 | 8.6 |
Rebroadcast episode
| 734 | 21 | Splash, Too (Part 1) | May 1, 1988 | 8.4 |
| 735 | 22 | Splash, Too (Part 2) | May 8, 1988 | 7.2 |
| 736 | 23 | Justin Case | May 15, 1988 | 9.4 |
| 737 | 24 | Captain EO Backstage | May 15, 1988 | 10.4 |
| 738 | 25 | Meet the Munceys | May 22, 1988 | 7.5 |
| 739 | 26 | Roger Rabbit and the Secrets of Toontown | September 13, 1988 | 11.4 |

== The Magical World of Disney episodes ==
=== Season 33 (1988–1989) ===
| No. overall | No. in season | Title | Original release date | U.S. viewers (millions) |
|---|---|---|---|---|
| 740 | 1 | The Magical World of Disney | October 9, 1988 | 16.8 |
As The Magical World of Disney debut and grand opening special program of 54 minutes. It consists of a review of the Walt Disney anthology series' run on television, and also serves as a preview for NBC's 1988-89 television season. The Roger Rabbit cartoon Tummy Trouble was also shown. The special ended with a medley of "Heigh-Ho", "Come Home to the Best, Only on NBC" (NBC's 1988-89 image campaign at the time), "Zip-a-Dee-Doo-Dah", "Supercalifragilisticexpialidocious", and "Smile, Darn Ya, Smile"; followed by the Mouseketeers signing off with the "it's-time-to-say-goodbye" verse of the Mickey Mouse March.
| 741 | 2 | Disney's All-American Sports Nuts | October 16, 1988 | 13.2 |
Featuring star athletes in comedy sketches and integrating classic Animation from the Disney sports library. No original animation produced.
| 742 | 3 | The Goonies | October 23, 1988 | 12.8 |
Produced by Warner Bros.
| 743 | 4 | Dumbo | October 30, 1988 | 20.8 |
Originally released theatrically in 1941. Animated film. Rebroadcast.
| 744 | 5 | Mickey's 60th Birthday | November 13, 1988 | 23.1 |
Produced for the 60th anniversary of Mickey Mouse, much of the footage featured in this special is live-action with newly made animation.
| 745 | 6 | Davy Crockett: Rainbow in the Thunder | November 20, 1988 | 19.7 |
| 746 | 7 | Winnie the Pooh and Tigger Too | November 26, 1988 | 7.1 |
Rebroadcast.
| 747 | 8 | The Absent-Minded Professor | November 27, 1988 | 20.0 |
1988 sequel featuring Harry Anderson.
| 748 | 9 | Mickey's Christmas Carol | December 4, 1988 | 24.1 |
A full hour TV broadcast featuring animated featurette of same plus additional content, with the first half consisting of three winter-themed theatrical Disney shorts. Each segment was preceded by a narrative wraparound segment in which one of the characters (Donald, Pluto (with Mickey translating), Goofy and Mickey, respectively) would talk about his favorite Christmas, thus leading into the cartoon in question. Also includes scenes from Oliver and Company. Rebroadcast episode from seasons 31 and 32.
| 749 | 10 | Disney's All-Star Comedy Circus | December 11, 1988 | 15.7 |
Hosted by Dick Van Dyke.
| 750 | 11 | Davy Crockett: A Natural Man | December 18, 1988 | 14.5 |
| 751 | 12 | Alice in Wonderland | December 24, 1988 | 5.3 |
Originally released theatrically in 1951; animated film; rebroadcast.
| 752 | 13 | Disney's Golden Anniversary of Snow White and the Seven Dwarfs | December 25, 1988 | 11.9 |
A documentary about an animated classic.
| 753 | 14 | An All-New Adventure of Disney's Sport Goofy | January 1, 1989 | 15.0 |
Sport Goofy's humorous take on sports featuring various clips from classic animated shorts. Rebroadcast.
| 754 | 15 | Dinosaur... Secret of the Lost Legend | January 8, 1989 | 17.3 |
Originally released theatrically as Baby: Secret of the Lost Legend by Touchstone Pictures in 1985
| 755 | 16 | Wild Jack: Episode 1 | January 15, 1989 | 14.7 |
| 756 | 17 | Herbie Goes Bananas | January 22, 1989 | 5.9 |
Originally released theatrically in 1980. Rebroadcast.
| 757 | 18 | Winnie the Pooh and a Day for Eeyore | January 29, 1989 | 20.1 |
Animated featurette. Rebroadcast. Was postponed from an unknown earlier date.
| 758 | 19 | Save the Dog | February 5, 1989 | 14.6 |
| 759 | 20 | Mickey's Happy Valentine Special | February 12, 1989 | 18.0 |
Animated special featuring clips from various anthology episodes and animated shorts.
| 760 | 21 | Benji the Hunted | February 19, 1989 | 16.8 |
Originally released theatrically in 1987
| 761 | 22 | The Absent-Minded Professor: Trading Places | February 26, 1989 | 15.6 |
| 762 | 23 | Winnie the Pooh and the Blustery Day | March 5, 1989 | 21.6 |
Animated featurette. Rebroadcast.
| 763 | 24 | Super DuckTales | March 26, 1989 | 16.7 |
Prime time animated special featuring DuckTales.
| 764 | 25 | Sesame Street... 20 Years & Still Counting | April 7, 1989 | 12.6 |
| 765 | 26 | Parent Trap III, Part 1 | April 9, 1989 | 19.3 |
| 766 | 27 | Parent Trap III, Part 2 | April 16, 1989 | 15.1 |
| 767 | 28 | The Disney-MGM Studios Theme Park Grand Opening | April 30, 1989 | 14.6 |
A celebration of the new Disney-MGM studio opening. The show includes various clips from classic animated shorts.
| 768 | 29 | Totally Minnie | May 7, 1989 | 11.1 |
A new animated special featuring Minnie Mouse.
| 769 | 30 | Lots of Luck | May 28, 1989 | 7.0 |
| 770 | 31 | Davy Crockett: A Letter to Polly | June 11, 1989 | 8.2 |
| 771 | 32 | Davy Crockett: Warrior's Farewell | June 18, 1989 | 8.5 |
| 772 | 33 | Wild Jack: Episode 2 | July 9, 1989 | 9.5 |
| 773 | 34 | Wild Jack: Episode 3 | July 16, 1989 | 12.5 |
| 774 | 35 | Disney's Magic in the Magic Kingdom | July 23, 1989 | 11.7 |

=== Season 34 (1989–1990) ===
| No. overall | No. in season | Title | Original release date | U.S. viewers (millions) |
|---|---|---|---|---|
| 775 | 1 | Parent Trap III (Part 1) | September 10, 1989 | 9.2 |
| 776 | 2 | Parent Trap III (Part 2) | September 17, 1989 | 8.2 |
| 777 | 3 | ALF Takes Over the Network | September 24, 1989 | 6.6 |
| 778 | 4 | Brand New Life: Above and Beyond Therapy | October 1, 1989 | 7.8 |
| 779 | 5 | Brand New Life: I Fought the Law | October 15, 1989 | 8.6 |
| 780 | 6 | Brand New Life: Private School | October 22, 1989 | 8.2 |
| 781 | 7 | Ernest Goes to Camp (Part 1) | October 29, 1989 | 10.5 |
Originally released theatrically by Touchstone Pictures in 1987
| 782 | 8 | Ernest Goes to Camp (Part 2) | November 5, 1989 | 9.7 |
Originally released theatrically by Touchstone Pictures in 1987
| 783 | 9 | Polly | November 12, 1989 | 14.1 |
Original musical
| 784 | 10 | Parent Trap: Hawaiian Honeymoon (Part 1) | November 19, 1989 | 10.3 |
| 785 | 11 | Parent Trap: Hawaiian Honeymoon (Part 2) | November 26, 1989 | 9.0 |
| 786 | 12 | A Mother's Courage: The Mary Thomas Story (Part 1) | December 3, 1989 | 10.3 |
| 787 | 13 | A Mother's Courage: The Mary Thomas Story (Part 2) | December 10, 1989 | 9.9 |
| 788 | 14 | Mickey's Christmas Carol | December 17, 1989 | 12.4 |
Rebroadcast episode from seasons 31, 32 and 33. Includes a behind-the-scenes look at The Little Mermaid.
| 789 | 15 | A Muppet Family Christmas | December 24, 1989 | 6.5 |
Rebroadcast episode.
| 790 | 16 | Brand New Life: Children of a Legal Mom | January 7, 1990 | 9.5 |
| 791 | 17 | Exile | January 14, 1990 | 11.5 |
| 792 | 18 | Winnie the Pooh and the Honey Tree | January 21, 1990 | 8.6 |
Animated featurette. Rebroadcast.
| 793 | 19 | Annie | January 28, 1990 | 9.4 |
Produced by Columbia Pictures.
| 794 | 20 | Disneyland's 35th Anniversary Celebration | February 4, 1990 | 8.7 |
| 795 | 21 | A DuckTales Valentine | February 11, 1990 | 9.1 |
An edited version of the episode "Amour or Less" from DuckTales.
| 796 | 22 | The Goonies | February 18, 1990 | 8.7 |
Rebroadcast episode. Produced by Warner Bros.
| 797 | 23 | Can't Buy Me Love | March 4, 1990 | 8.9 |
Originally released theatrically by Touchstone Pictures in 1987
| 798 | 24 | Sky High: Episode 1 | March 11, 1990 | 12.7 |
| 799 | 25 | The Gifted One | March 18, 1990 | 18.4 |
| 800 | 26 | The Rescue | March 25, 1990 | 13.2 |
Originally released theatrically by Touchstone Pictures in 1988
| 801 | 27 | Not Quite Human II | April 1, 1990 | 12.3 |
| 802 | 28 | Spooner (Part 1) | April 22, 1990 | 4.8 |
| 803 | 29 | Spooner (Part 2) | April 29, 1990 | 5.3 |
| 804 | 30 | The Muppets at Walt Disney World | May 6, 1990 | 4.9 |
| 805 | 31 | Brand New Life: The Honeymooners | June 24, 1990 | 9.3 |
| 806 | 32 | A Friendship in Vienna | July 15, 1990 | 4.9 |
| 807 | 33 | Sky High: Episode 2 | August 26, 1990 | 4.7 |
| 808 | 34 | The Goonies | September 2, 1990 | 11.5 |
Rebroadcast episode. Produced by Warner Bros.

=== Season 35 (1990–1991) ===
| No. overall | No. in season | Title | Original release date | U.S. viewers (millions) |
|---|---|---|---|---|
| 809 | 1 | Three Men and a Baby | November 4, 1990 | 19.9 |
Originally released theatrically by Touchstone Pictures in 1987
| 810 | 2 | Polly: Comin' Home! | November 18, 1990 | 6.8 |
Original musical; sequel to Polly, original 1989 television musical
| 811 | 3 | The Muppets Celebrate Jim Henson | November 21, 1990 | 8.6 |
| 812 | 4 | Mickey's Christmas Carol | December 17, 1990 | 12.6 |
Rebroadcast episode from seasons 31, 32, 33 and 34. Includes a behind-the-scenes look at The Rescuers Down Under.
| 813 | 5 | A Mom for Christmas | December 17, 1990 | 17.0 |
| 814 | 6 | Disney Christmas on Ice | December 21, 1990 | 9.9 |
Live-action figure skating set under the themes of various Disney films.
| 815 | 7 | New Kids on the Block at Disney-MGM Studios: Wildest Dreams | January 25, 1991 | 12.6 |
| 816 | 8 | Tag Team | January 26, 1991 | 7.0 |
| 817 | 9 | The 100 Lives of Black Jack Savage | March 31, 1991 | 9.4 |
| 818 | 10 | She Stood Alone | April 15, 1991 | 10.5 |
| 819 | 11 | The Best of Disney: 50 Years of Magic | May 20, 1991 | 12.0 |
TV special and documentary about Disney magic including animation. Last episode to feature original animation of core Disney universe characters.
| 820 | 12 | Plymouth | May 26, 1991 | 8.3 |
| 821 | 13 | Our Shining Moment | June 2, 1991 | 4.1 |
| 822 | 14 | Disney's Great American Celebration | July 4, 1991 | 4.9 |
| 823 | 15 | Acting Sheriff (30 min.) | August 17, 1991 | 4.6 |

=== Season 36 (1991–1992) ===
| No. overall | No. in season | Title | Original release date | U.S. viewers (millions) |
|---|---|---|---|---|
| 824 | 1 | Walt Disney World Past, Present, and Future | October 20, 1991 | N/A |
| 825 | 2 | The Dream is Alive: The 20th Anniversary Celebration of Walt Disney World | October 25, 1991 | 8.1 |
| 826 | 3 | It's the Great Pumpkin, Charlie Brown | October 30, 1991 | 9.8 |
Rebroadcast episode.
| 827 | 4 | Who Framed Roger Rabbit | November 12, 1991 | 9.9 |
Originally released theatrically by Touchstone Pictures in 1988; live-action and animation hybrid film
| 828 | 5 | Honey, I Shrunk the Kids | November 26, 1991 | 12.6 |
Originally released theatrically in 1989
| 829 | 6 | E.T. the Extra-Terrestrial | November 28, 1991 | 18.4 |
Produced by Universal Pictures and Amblin Entertainment.
| 830 | 7 | Mickey's Christmas Carol | December 13, 1991 | 9.5 |
Rebroadcast episode from seasons 31, 32, 33, 34 and 35. Includes a retrospective on Fantasia and a behind-the-scenes look at Beauty and the Beast.
| 831 | 8 | Winnie the Pooh and Christmas Too | December 14, 1991 | 10.8 |
A 1-hour presentation, consisting of the 1991 special, 2 Donald Duck cartoons, and a promo for Beauty and the Beast.
| 832 | 9 | Ernest Saves Christmas | December 14, 1991 | 12.7 |
Originally released theatrically by Touchstone Pictures in 1988
| 833 | 10 | In the Nick of Time | December 16, 1991 | 12.9 |
| 834 | 11 | A Charlie Brown Christmas | December 20, 1991 | 9.6 |
Rebroadcast episode.
| 835 | 12 | The Wish That Changed Christmas | December 20, 1991 | 9.3 |
| 836 | 13 | The Walt Disney World Very Merry Christmas Parade | December 25, 1991 | N/A |
| 837 | 14 | Dead Poets Society | January 3, 1992 | 11.3 |
Originally released theatrically by Touchstone Pictures in 1989
| 838 | 15 | Grand Opening of Euro Disney | April 11, 1992 | 6.7 |
| 839 | 16 | Walt Disney World's Happy Easter Parade | April 19, 1992 | N/A |
| 840 | 17 | Honey, I Shrunk the Kids | April 25, 1992 | 7.9 |
Originally released theatrically in 1989. Rebroadcast episode.
| 841 | 18 | Turner & Hooch | May 2, 1992 | 8.1 |
Originally released theatrically by Touchstone Pictures in 1989

=== Season 37 (1992–1993) ===
| No. overall | No. in season | Title | Original release date | U.S. viewers (millions) |
|---|---|---|---|---|
| 842 | 1 | Dead Poets Society | November 21, 1992 | 8.1 |
Originally released theatrically by Touchstone Pictures in 1989. Rebroadcast episode.
| 843 | 2 | It's Christmastime Again, Charlie Brown | November 27, 1992 | 10.0 |
| 844 | 3 | A Charlie Brown Christmas | December 2, 1992 | N/A |
Rebroadcast episode.
| 845 | 4 | A Garfield Christmas | December 2, 1992 | N/A |
Rebroadcast episode.
| 846 | 5 | To Grandmother's House We Go | December 6, 1992 | 16.9 |
| 847 | 6 | Winnie the Pooh and Christmas Too | December 11, 1992 | 14.3 |
Rebroadcast episode from season 36. Includes these behind-the-scenes looks at Beauty and the Beast and The Muppet Christmas Carol.
| 848 | 7 | Who Framed Roger Rabbit | December 12, 1992 | 7.9 |
Originally released theatrically by Touchstone Pictures in 1988. Rebroadcast episode.
| 849 | 8 | Frosty the Snowman | December 16, 1992 | 12.3 |
Rebroadcast episode.
| 850 | 9 | The Wish That Changed Christmas | December 16, 1992 | 11.8 |
Rebroadcast episode.
| 851 | 10 | Disney Christmas Fantasy on Ice | December 19, 1992 | 16.1 |
| 852 | 11 | Holiday Greetings from The Ed Sullivan Show | December 20, 1992 | 14.3 |
| 853 | 12 | The Walt Disney World Very Merry Christmas Parade | December 25, 1992 | N/A |
| 854 | 13 | The Flintstones: I Yabba-Dabba Do! | February 7, 1993 | 12.4 |
| 855 | 14 | Walt Disney World Happy Easter Parade | April 11, 1993 | N/A |
| 856 | 15 | Bugs Bunny's Bustin' Out All Over | April 22, 1993 | 6.1 |
Produced by Warner Bros. Animation. Rebroadcast episode.
| 857 | 16 | The Magic Paintbrush | April 22, 1993 | 5.6 |
| 858 | 17 | The Olsen Twins Mother's Day Special | May 5, 1993 | 10.5 |
| 859 | 18 | The Best of Disney Music: A Legacy in Song | May 21, 1993 | 10.5 |
| 860 | 19 | Walt Disney World Journey Into Magic | May 23, 1993 | N/A |

=== Season 38 (1993–1994) ===
| No. overall | No. in season | Title | Original release date | U.S. viewers (millions) |
|---|---|---|---|---|
| 861 | 1 | Double, Double, Toil and Trouble | October 30, 1993 | 10.8 |
| 862 | 2 | Mickey's Christmas Carol | December 1, 1993 | 9.4 |
Rebroadcast episode from seasons 31, 32, 33, 34, 35 and 36. Includes a behind-the-scenes look at The Nightmare Before Christmas.
| 863 | 3 | To Grandmother's House We Go | December 4, 1993 | 8.6 |
Rebroadcast episode.
| 864 | 4 | The Flintstones: Hollyrock-a-Bye Baby | December 5, 1993 | 9.8 |
| 865 | 5 | Winnie the Pooh and Christmas Too | December 8, 1993 | 9.7 |
Rebroadcast episode from seasons 36 and 37. Includes a behind-the-scenes look at Aladdin.
| 866 | 6 | Ernest Saves Christmas | December 11, 1993 | 8.8 |
Originally released theatrically by Touchstone Pictures in 1988. Rebroadcast episode.
| 867 | 7 | The Flintstones: A Flintstone Family Christmas | December 18, 1993 | 6.7 |
| 868 | 8 | The Wish That Changed Christmas | December 18, 1993 | 6.9 |
Rebroadcast episode.
| 869 | 9 | A Musical Christmas at Walt Disney World | December 18, 1993 | 14.2 |
| 870 | 10 | A Charlie Brown Christmas | December 22, 1993 | 10.1 |
Rebroadcast episode.
| 871 | 11 | Disney Christmas Fantasy on Ice | December 24, 1993 | 6.9 |
Rebroadcast episode.
| 872 | 12 | The Walt Disney World Very Merry Christmas Parade | December 25, 1993 | N/A |
| 873 | 13 | You're in the Super Bowl, Charlie Brown | January 18, 1994 | 8.0 |
| 874 | 14 | To My Daughter With Love | January 24, 1994 | 20.0 |
On NBC under the umbrella title Disney Night at the Movies.
| 875 | 15 | One More Mountain | March 6, 1994 | 19.6 |
| 876 | 16 | Bedtime with Barney: Imagination Island | April 24, 1994 | 7.7 |
| 877 | 17 | The Sound of Music | April 24, 1994 | 10.8 |
Produced by 20th Century Fox (later owned by Disney and rebranded as 20th Century Studios) and Argyle Enterprises
| 878 | 18 | The Rocketeer | May 7, 1994 | 9.6 |
Originally released theatrically in 1991
| 879 | 19 | Sesame Street's 25th Birthday: Stars and Street Forever | May 18, 1994 | 7.5 |

=== Season 39 (1994–1995) ===
| No. overall | No. in season | Title | Original release date | U.S. viewers (millions) |
|---|---|---|---|---|
| 880 | 1 | Homeward Bound: The Incredible Journey | October 1, 1994 | 9.2 |
Originally released theatrically in 1993
| 881 | 2 | Double, Double, Toil and Trouble | October 29, 1994 | 7.8 |
Rebroadcast episode.
| 882 | 3 | Ernest Scared Stupid | November 5, 1994 | 6.6 |
Originally released theatrically by Touchstone Pictures in 1991
| 883 | 4 | The Shaggy Dog | November 12, 1994 | 9.3 |
Remake of the 1959 film of the same title.
| 884 | 5 | How the West Was Fun | November 19, 1994 | 8.7 |
| 885 | 6 | Disney's Greatest Hits on Ice | November 25, 1994 | 10.0 |
| 886 | 7 | Father of the Bride | November 27, 1994 | 14.6 |
Originally released theatrically by Touchstone Pictures in 1991.
| 887 | 8 | Frosty the Snowman | November 30, 1994 | 11.9 |
Rebroadcast episode.
| 888 | 9 | A Charlie Brown Christmas | December 7, 1994 | 10.6 |
Rebroadcast episode.
| 889 | 10 | The Wonderful World of Disney: 40 Years of Television Magic | December 10, 1994 | 7.5 |
Documentary about Disney animation and its TV legacy
| 890 | 11 | A Garfield Christmas | December 14, 1994 | 8.2 |
Rebroadcast episode.
| 891 | 12 | Mickey's Christmas Carol | December 22, 1994 | 10.6 |
Rebroadcast episode from seasons 31, 32, 33, 34, 35, 36 and 38. Includes a behind-the-scenes look at Rudyard Kipling's The Jungle Book.
| 892 | 13 | Disney Christmas Fantasy on Ice | December 23, 1994 | 8.9 |
Rebroadcast episode.
| 893 | 14 | Pete's Dragon | December 24, 1994 | 3.9 |
Rebroadcast episode.
| 894 | 15 | Walt Disney World's Very Merry Christmas Parade | December 25, 1994 | N/A |
| 895 | 16 | Encino Man | February 4, 1995 | 9.5 |
Originally released theatrically by Hollywood Pictures in 1992
| 896 | 17 | The Computer Wore Tennis Shoes | February 18, 1995 | 8.3 |
Remake of the 1969 film of the same title.
| 897 | 18 | The Adventures of Huck Finn | February 25, 1995 | 7.6 |
Originally released theatrically in 1993
| 898 | 19 | The Wonderful World of Disney: Forty Years of Adventure | March 4, 1995 | N/A |
| 899 | 20 | Pee-wee's Big Adventure | March 4, 1995 | 5.5 |
Produced by Warner Bros.
| 900 | 21 | What About Bob? | March 5, 1995 | 12.7 |
Originally released theatrically by Touchstone Pictures in 1991.
| 901 | 22 | Walt Disney World's Happy Easter Parade | April 16, 1995 | N/A |
| 902 | 23 | The Adventures of Mary-Kate & Ashley: Mystery on the High Seas | April 22, 1995 | 6.6 |
| 903 | 24 | Escape from Witch Mountain | April 29, 1995 | N/A |
Remake of the 1975 film of the same title.
| 904 | 25 | Freaky Friday | May 6, 1995 | 6.9 |
Remake of the 1976 film of the same title.
| 905 | 26 | Three Men and a Little Lady | May 13, 1995 | 7.0 |
Originally released theatrically by Touchstone Pictures in 1990
| 906 | 27 | Honey, I Blew Up the Kid | May 20, 1995 | 6.6 |
Originally released theatrically in 1992
| 907 | 28 | The Shaggy Dog | June 24, 1995 | 6.5 |
Rebroadcast episode.
| 908 | 29 | The Magic Paintbrush | July 1, 1995 | 4.9 |
Rebroadcast episode.
| 909 | 30 | DuckTales the Movie: Treasure of the Lost Lamp | July 1, 1995 | N/A |
| 910 | 31 | The Adventures of Huck Finn | July 22, 1995 | 4.8 |
Rebroadcast episode.
| 911 | 32 | The Computer Wore Tennis Shoes | July 29, 1995 | 5.3 |
Rebroadcast episode.
| 912 | 33 | Who Framed Roger Rabbit | August 18, 1995 | 5.9 |
Rebroadcast episode.
| 913 | 34 | The Adventures of Mary-Kate & Ashley: Mystery on the High Seas | August 26, 1995 | 4.1 |
Rebroadcast episode.

=== Season 40 (1995–1996) ===
| No. overall | No. in season | Title | Original release date | U.S. viewers (millions) |
|---|---|---|---|---|
| 914 | 1 | Encino Man | September 16, 1995 | 7.3 |
Rebroadcast episode. Originally released theatrically by Hollywood Pictures in 1992.
| 915 | 2 | Hocus Pocus | October 28, 1995 | 9.5 |
Originally released theatrically in 1993
| 916 | 3 | Father of the Bride | November 2, 1995 | 9.0 |
Rebroadcast episode.
| 917 | 4 | The Barefoot Executive | November 11, 1995 | 6.0 |
Remake of the 1971 film of the same title.
| 918 | 5 | Disney's Aladdin on Ice | November 17, 1995 | 7.6 |
| 919 | 6 | Annie: A Royal Adventure! | November 18, 1995 | 5.2 |
| 920 | 7 | What About Bob? | November 25, 1995 | 7.1 |
Rebroadcast episode.
| 921 | 8 | Frosty the Snowman | December 1, 1995 | 9.2 |
Rebroadcast episode.
| 922 | 9 | Frosty Returns | December 1, 1995 | 9.9 |
| 923 | 10 | A Charlie Brown Christmas | December 6, 1995 | 11.0 |
Rebroadcast episode.
| 924 | 11 | Mr. Willowby's Christmas Tree | December 6, 1995 | 8.8 |
| 925 | 12 | Winnie the Pooh and Christmas Too | December 21, 1995 | 9.3 |
Rebroadcast episode from seasons 36, 37 and 38. Including The New Adventures of Winnie the Pooh episode "Magic Earmuffs" and a behind-the-scenes look at Toy Story.
| 926 | 13 | Mickey's Christmas Carol | December 21, 1995 | 8.5 |
Rebroadcast episode from seasons 31, 32, 33, 34, 35, 36, 38 and 39. Included a sneak peek of The Hunchback of Notre Dame.
| 927 | 14 | The Sound of Music | December 22, 1995 | 8.8 |
Produced by 20th Century Fox (later owned by Disney and rebranded as 20th Century Studios) and Argyle Enterprises. Rebroadcast episode from season 38.
| 928 | 15 | Homeward Bound: The Incredible Journey | December 23, 1995 | 7.7 |
Originally released theatrically in 1993
| 929 | 16 | Walt Disney World's Very Merry Christmas Parade | December 25, 1995 | N/A |
| 930 | 17 | Disney's Greatest Hits on Ice | December 28, 1995 | 7.5 |
| 931 | 18 | Ernest Rides Again | December 30, 1995 | 7.0 |
| 932 | 19 | Iron Will | January 6, 1996 | 8.0 |
Originally released theatrically in 1994
| 933 | 20 | Splash | February 3, 1996 | 8.3 |
Originally released theatrically by Touchstone Pictures in 1984
| 934 | 21 | Life with Mikey | February 10, 1996 | 6.1 |
Originally released theatrically by Touchstone Pictures in 1993; also known as Give Me a Break.
| 935 | 22 | Freaky Friday | March 2, 1996 | 5.8 |
Rebroadcast episode from season 39.
| 936 | 23 | Disney's Champions on Ice | March 9, 1996 | 7.4 |
| 937 | 24 | The Rocketeer | March 16, 1996 | 6.2 |
Originally released theatrically in 1991
| 938 | 25 | Walt Disney World's Happy Easter Parade | April 7, 1996 | N/A |
| 939 | 26 | Encino Woman | April 20, 1996 | 5.4 |
Sequel to Encino Man.
| 940 | 27 | The Hunchback of Notre Dame Festival of Fun Parade to Celebrate the Premiere / The Hunchback of Notre Dame Festival of Fun Musical Spectacular in New Orleans | June 6, 1996 | N/A |
| 941 | 28 | Disney's Most Unlikely Heroes - The Making of The Hunchback of Notre Dame | June 18, 1996 | 8.1 |
| 942 | 29 | Hunchback of Notre Dame Festival of Fools | June 23, 1996 | N/A |
| 943 | 30 | The Barefoot Executive | July 27, 1996 | 4.5 |
Rebroadcast episode.
| 944 | 31 | Life with Mikey | August 3, 1996 | 4.5 |
Rebroadcast episode. Originally released theatrically by Touchstone Pictures in 1993; also known as Give Me a Break.

=== Season 41 (1996–1997) ===
| No. overall | No. in season | Title | Original release date | U.S. viewers (millions) |
|---|---|---|---|---|
| 945 | 1 | The Lion King | November 3, 1996 | 15.2 |
| 946 | 2 | Father of the Bride | November 9, 1996 | 8.7 |
Rebroadcast episode.
| 953 | 3 | Beauty and the Beast: A Concert on Ice | December 6, 1996 | 8.0 |
| 954 | 4 | Disney's Doug's Secret Christmas (30 min.) | December 14, 1996 | 5.4 |
Episode from the Disney Doug series, produced by Jumbo Pictures.
| 958 | 5 | Honey, I Blew Up the Kid | December 21, 1996 | 5.8 |
Rebroadcast episode.
| 959 | 6 | The Christmas Tree | December 22, 1996 | 9.0 |
| 960 | 7 | Walt Disney World's Very Merry Christmas Parade | December 25, 1996 | N/A |
| 961 | 8 | Blank Check | January 11, 1997 | 7.1 |
| 962 | 9 | Beverly Hills Family Robinson | January 25, 1997 | 6.8 |
| 963 | 10 | In the Army Now | March 8, 1997 | 6.7 |
| 964 | 11 | Walt Disney World Easter Parade | March 30, 1997 | N/A |
| 965 | 12 | The Sandlot | April 5, 1997 | 6.3 |
Produced by 20th Century Fox (later owned by Disney and rebranded as 20th Century Studios) and Island World
| 966 | 13 | Angels in the Outfield | May 11, 1997 | 6.0 |
| 967 | 14 | Disney World's 25th Anniversary | June 9, 1997 | 7.7 |
| 968 | 15 | Disney's Hercules Strikes Manhattan Movie Premiere and Parade | June 15, 1997 | N/A |
| 969 | 16 | Beauty and the Beast: A Concert on Ice | August 9, 1997 | 4.8 |
Rebroadcast episode.

== The Wonderful World of Disney episodes (second run) ==
=== Season 42 (1997–1998)/ABC Family Movie ===
The ABC Family Movie name was used this season for broadcasts of family movies from other companies.

| No. overall | No. in season | Title | Original release date | U.S. viewers (millions) |
|---|---|---|---|---|
| 970 | 1 | Toy Story | September 28, 1997 | 16.4 |
Animated film produced by Pixar; first Pixar film aired on television.
| 971 | 2 | Toothless | October 5, 1997 | 13.9 |
TV film.
| 972 | 3 | Honey, We Shrunk Ourselves | October 12, 1997 | 6.7 |
Includes a behind-the-scenes look at Rodgers and Hammerstein's Cinderella.
| 973 | 4 | Sabrina the Teenage Witch | October 19, 1997 | 9.1 |
Originally aired on Showtime in 1996.
| 974 | 5 | Tower of Terror | October 26, 1997 | 6.9 |
TV film produced for the series.
| 975 | 6 | Rodgers & Hammerstein's Cinderella | November 2, 1997 | 18.4 |
Rebroadcast for its 25th anniversary on August 23, 2022. TV film produced for the series.
| 976 | 7 | Angels in the Endzone | November 9, 1997 | 8.7 |
Sequel to Angels in the Outfield. TV film produced for the series.
| 977 | 8 | Oliver Twist | November 16, 1997 | 7.7 |
| 978 | 9 | The Santa Clause | November 23, 1997 | 10.9 |
| 979 | 10 | The Love Bug | November 30, 1997 | 11.6 |
| 980 | 11 | A Charlie Brown Christmas | December 3, 1997 | 18.0 |
Rebroadcast episode.
| 981 | 12 | A Garfield Christmas | December 3, 1997 | 17.9 |
Rebroadcast episode.
| 982 | 13 | Winnie the Pooh and Christmas Too | December 5, 1997 | 14.4 |
Rebroadcast episode from seasons 36, 37, 38, 40 and 41.
| 983 | 14 | Rudyard Kipling's The Jungle Book | December 7, 1997 | 13.6 |
| 984 | 15 | Frosty the Snowman | December 12, 1997 | 13.6 |
Rebroadcast episode.
| 985 | 16 | Frosty Returns | December 12, 1997 | 13.7 |
Rebroadcast episode.
| 986 | 17 | The Story of Santa Claus | December 12, 1997 | 13.0 |
Rebroadcast episode.
| 987 | 18 | The Online Adventures of Ozzie the Elf | December 13, 1997 | 5.5 |
| 988 | 19 | Santa vs. the Snowman | December 13, 1997 | 6.3 |
| 989 | 20 | The Flintstones | December 14, 1997 | 6.3 |
Presented under ABC Family Movie banner. Live-action film based on the 1960s Hanna-Barbera cartoon of the same name, produced by Universal Pictures, Amblin Entertainment and Hanna-Barbera.
| 990 | 21 | Mickey's Christmas Carol | December 19, 1997 | 9.1 |
Rebroadcast episode from seasons 31, 32, 33, 34, 35, 36, 38, 39 and 40.
| 991 | 22 | Beauty and the Beast: A Concert on Ice | December 20, 1997 | 5.5 |
Rebroadcast episode.
| 992 | 23 | Disney's Christmas Fantasy on Ice | December 20, 1997 | 6.0 |
| 993 | 24 | Flash | December 21, 1997 | 9.9 |
| 994 | 25 | A Little Princess | December 28, 1997 | 12.2 |
Presented under ABC Family Movie banner. Produced by Warner Bros.
| 995 | 26 | Principal Takes a Holiday | January 4, 1998 | 12.3 |
| 996 | 27 | Houseguest | January 11, 1998 | 11.4 |
| 997 | 28 | Ruby Bridges | January 18, 1998 | 9.5 |
The show's introduction was filmed in the White House cabinet room, where Michael Eisner was joined by President Bill Clinton. The movie was followed by an ABC News interview with the real Ruby Bridges.
| 998 | 29 | Look Who's Talking Now | January 25, 1998 | 7.1 |
Presented under ABC Family Movie banner. Produced by TriStar Pictures.
| 999 | 30 | Aladdin and the King of Thieves | February 8, 1998 | 6.7 |
DTV - Animated film.
| 1000 | 31 | The Garbage Picking Field Goal Kicking Philadelphia Phenomenon | February 15, 1998 | 8.0 |
| 1001 | 32 | Sesame Street: Elmopalooza! | February 20, 1998 | 4.7 |
| 1002 | 33 | Casper | February 22, 1998 | 8.8 |
Presented under ABC Family Movie banner. Produced by Universal Pictures and Amblin Entertainment.
| 1003 | 34 | Pocahontas | March 1, 1998 | 9.1 |
Animated film.
| 1004 | 35 | Goldrush: A Real Life Alaskan Adventure | March 8, 1998 | 8.3 |
| 1005 | 36 | Mr. Headmistress | March 15, 1998 | 5.5 |
| 1006 | 37 | The Little Rascals | March 22, 1998 | 9.1 |
Presented under ABC Family Movie banner. Produced by Universal Pictures and Amblin Entertainment.
| 1007 | 38 | Safety Patrol | March 29, 1998 | 4.3 |
| 1008 | 39 | Tourist Trap | April 5, 1998 | 4.9 |
| 1009 | 40 | My Date with the President's Daughter | April 19, 1998 | 7.2 |
| 1010 | 41 | Disney's Animal Kingdom: The First Adventure | April 26, 1998 | 5.9 |
A 1-hour presentation.
| 1011 | 42 | Babe | May 3, 1998 | 8.4 |
Presented under ABC Family Movie banner. Produced by Universal Pictures.
| 1012 | 43 | The Lion King | May 10, 1998 | 7.7 |
Animated film. Includes a sneak peek of The Lion King II: Simba's Pride.
| 1013 | 44 | Miracle at Midnight | May 17, 1998 | 5.2 |
| 1014 | 45 | Andre | May 24, 1998 | 3.6 |
Presented under ABC Family Movie banner. Produced by Paramount Pictures.
| 1015 | 46 | Beverly Hills Family Robinson | May 31, 1998 | 5.0 |
| 1016 | 47 | Monkey Trouble | June 7, 1998 | 5.6 |
Presented under ABC Family Movie banner. Produced by New Line Cinema.
| 1017 | 48 | The Big Green | June 14, 1998 | 4.8 |
| 1018 | 49 | Reflections on Ice: Michelle Kwan Skates to the Music of Disney's Mulan | June 16, 1998 | N/A |
| 1019 | 50 | Born to Be Wild | June 21, 1998 | 3.7 |
Presented under ABC Family Movie banner. Produced by Warner Bros.
| 1020 | 51 | Lassie | June 28, 1998 | 3.8 |
Presented under ABC Family Movie banner. Produced by Paramount Pictures.
| 1021 | 52 | Slam Dunk Ernest | July 5, 1998 | 3.8 |
Presented under ABC Family Movie banner.
| 1022 | 53 | Sabrina the Teenage Witch | July 12, 1998 | 5.1 |
Presented under ABC Family Movie banner.
| 1023 | 54 | Black Beauty | July 19, 1998 | 3.4 |
Presented under ABC Family Movie banner. Produced by Warner Bros.
| 1024 | 55 | Angels in the Endzone | July 26, 1998 | 4.4 |
| 1025 | 56 | Ernest Rides Again | August 2, 1998 | 2.7 |
Presented under ABC Family Movie banner.
| 1026 | 57 | Far from Home: The Adventures of Yellow Dog | August 9, 1998 | 4.7 |
Presented under ABC Family Movie banner. Produced by 20th Century Fox (later owned by Disney and rebranded as 20th Century Studios)
| 1027 | 58 | The Ransom of Red Chief | August 16, 1998 | 3.1 |
| 1028 | 59 | The Garbage Picking Field Goal Kicking Philadelphia Phenomenon | August 23, 1998 | 4.9 |
| 1029 | 60 | 3 Ninjas Kick Back | August 30, 1998 | 4.2 |
Presented under ABC Family Movie banner. Produced by TriStar Pictures.
| 1030 | 61 | Ernest Goes to School | September 6, 1998 | 3.0 |
Presented under ABC Family Movie banner.
| 1031 | 62 | Angels in the Outfield | September 13, 1998 | 5.4 |
| 1032 | 63 | Toothless | September 20, 1998 | 5.1 |

=== Season 43 (1998–1999) ===
| No. overall | No. in season | Title | Original release date | U.S. viewers (millions) |
|---|---|---|---|---|
| 1032 | 1 | George of the Jungle | September 27, 1998 | 7.7 |
Based on Jay Ward properties.
| 1033 | 2 | Sabrina Goes to Rome | October 4, 1998 | 7.9 |
| 1034 | 3 | Noah | October 11, 1998 | 8.5 |
| 1035 | 4 | The Hunchback of Notre Dame | October 18, 1998 | 5.7 |
Animated film.
| 1036 | 5 | Casper | October 25, 1998 | 7.5 |
Rebroadcast episode from season 42. Produced by Universal Pictures and Amblin Entertainment.
| 1037 | 6 | Boo to You Too! Winnie the Pooh | October 31, 1998 | 3.5 |
Rebroadcast episode from season 41.
| 1038 | 7 | 101 Dalmatians | November 1, 1998 | 9.3 |
| 1039 | 8 | A Knight in Camelot | November 8, 1998 | 8.8 |
TV film produced for the series.
| 1040 | 9 | Sleeping Beauty | November 15, 1998 | N/A |
Animated film. Preceded by a sneak preview of A Bug's Life.
| 1041 | 10 | The Santa Clause | November 22, 1998 | 10.1 |
Introduction by Michael Eisner and Tim Allen.
| 1042 | 11 | A Winnie the Pooh Thanksgiving | November 26, 1998 | 3.8 |
A 1-hour presentation. Includes the 1968 featurette Winnie the Pooh and the Blustery Day.
| 1043 | 12 | Flipper | November 29, 1998 | 6.4 |
Produced by Universal Pictures and The Bubble Factory.
| 1044 | 13 | Winnie the Pooh and Christmas Too | December 6, 1998 | 6.7 |
Rebroadcast episode from seasons 36, 37, 38, 40, 41 and 42.
| 1045 | 14 | Beauty and the Beast: The Enchanted Christmas | December 6, 1998 | 6.7 |
DTV-animated film.
| 1046 | 15 | Murder She Purred: A Mrs. Murphy Mystery | December 13, 1998 | 7.1 |
| 1047 | 16 | The Baby-Sitters Club | December 20, 1998 | 4.0 |
Produced by Columbia Pictures.
| 1048 | 17 | The Indian in the Cupboard | December 27, 1998 | 5.3 |
Produced by Paramount Pictures and Columbia Pictures.
| 1049 | 18 | D3: The Mighty Ducks | January 3, 1999 | 5.8 |
| 1050 | 19 | The New Swiss Family Robinson | January 10, 1999 | 9.3 |
| 1051 | 20 | Selma, Lord, Selma | January 17, 1999 | 5.4 |
| 1052 | 21 | A Saintly Switch | January 24, 1999 | 7.1 |
| 1053 | 22 | Muppet Treasure Island | January 31, 1999 | 2.3 |
| 1054 | 23 | Winnie the Pooh: A Valentine for You | February 13, 1999 | 3.9 |
A 1-hour presentation. Including The New Adventures of Winnie the Pooh episode "Groundpiglet Day" and shorts from the then-upcoming Mickey Mouse Works television show.
| 1055 | 24 | Rodgers and Hammerstein's Cinderella | February 14, 1999 | 6.5 |
Rebroadcast episode from season 42.
| 1056 | 25 | Mr. Holland's Opus | February 21, 1999 | 9.3 |
Aired as part of ABC's Flashback Weekend.
| 1057 | 26 | The Little Mermaid | February 28, 1999 | 6.3 |
Animated film.
| 1068 | 37 | Michelle Kwan Skates to Disney's Greatest Hits | March 6, 1999 | N/A |
| 1068 | 37 | Ed | March 7, 1999 | 6.5 |
Produced by Universal Pictures.
| 1069 | 38 | Matilda | March 14, 1999 | 9.1 |
Produced by TriStar Pictures.
| 1070 | 39 | Balloon Farm | March 28, 1999 | 6.2 |
| 1071 | 40 | The Little Rascals | April 4, 1999 | 5.2 |
Rebroadcast episode from season 42. Presented under ABC Big Picture Show banner. Produced by Universal Pictures and Amblin Entertainment.
| 1072 | 41 | Harriet the Spy | April 11, 1999 | 5.6 |
Produced by Paramount Pictures and Nickelodeon Movies.
| 1073 | 42 | Fly Away Home | April 18, 1999 | 5.3 |
Produced by Columbia Pictures.
| 1074 | 43 | Eddie | April 25, 1999 | 6.9 |
| 1075 | 44 | Phenomenon | May 2, 1999 | 7.4 |
Presented under ABC Big Picture Show banner.
| 1076 | 45 | Flubber | May 9, 1999 | 6.5 |
| 1077 | 46 | Father of the Bride | May 16, 1999 | 6.3 |
| 1078 | 47 | Hercules | May 23, 1999 | 5.1 |
Animated film.
| 1079 | 48 | Dogmatic | May 30, 1999 | 4.9 |
| 1080 | 49 | Principal Takes a Holiday | June 6, 1999 | 4.2 |
| 1081 | 50 | Aladdin and the King of Thieves | June 13, 1999 | 3.7 |
| 1082 | 51 | Far from Home: The Adventures of Yellow Dog | June 20, 1999 | 4.0 |
Repeat under The Wonderful World of Disney banner.
| 1083 | 52 | Alaska | June 27, 1999 | 5.7 |
Produced by Castle Rock Entertainment.
| 1084 | 53 | Race the Sun | July 4, 1999 | 3.0 |
Produced by TriStar Pictures.
| 1085 | 54 | Loch Ness | July 11, 1999 | 4.1 |
| 1086 | 55 | Rudyard Kipling's The Jungle Book | July 18, 1999 | 5.3 |
| 1087 | 56 | Angels in the Outfield | July 25, 1999 | 5.2 |
| 1088 | 57 | My Date with the President's Daughter | August 1, 1999 | 5.1 |
| 1089 | 58 | A Kid in King Arthur's Court | August 8, 1999 | 4.1 |
| 1090 | 59 | The Adventures of Pinocchio | August 15, 1999 | 4.3 |
Produced by New Line Cinema and Savoy Pictures.
| 1091 | 60 | The Amazing Panda Adventure | August 22, 1999 | 4.7 |
Produced by Warner Bros.
| 1092 | 61 | Honey, We Shrunk Ourselves | August 29, 1999 | 4.9 |
| 1093 | 62 | Dennis the Menace | September 5, 1999 | 4.6 |
Produced by Warner Bros.
| 1094 | 63 | Sabrina Goes to Rome | September 12, 1999 | 8.0 |
| 1095 | 64 | Noah | September 19, 1999 | 9.1 |

=== Season 44 (1999–2000) ===
| No. overall | No. in season | Title | Original release date | U.S. viewers (millions) |
|---|---|---|---|---|
| 1096 | 1 | Sabrina Down Under | September 26, 1999 | 6.2 |
| 1097 | 2 | H-E Double Hockey Sticks | October 3, 1999 | 3.9 |
TV film produced for the series.
| 1098 | 3 | Sister Act 2: Back in the Habit | October 10, 1999 | 7.6 |
| 1099 | 4 | The Lion King II: Simba's Pride | October 17, 1999 | 7.1 |
Animated film. Preceded by a look at Walt Disney World's millennium celebration. Includes a sneak peek of Annie.
| 1100 | 5 | Father of the Bride Part II | October 24, 1999 | 6.9 |
| 1101 | 6 | It's the Great Pumpkin, Charlie Brown | October 29, 1999 | 5.9 |
Rebroadcast episode.
| 1102 | 7 | Garfield's Halloween Adventure | October 29, 1999 | 5.3 |
Rebroadcast episode.
| 1103 | 8 | Casper | October 31, 1999 | 5.7 |
Rebroadcast episode from seasons 42 and 43. Presented under ABC Big Picture Show banner. Produced by Universal Pictures and Amblin Entertainment.
| 1104 | 9 | Annie | November 7, 1999 | 14.2 |
| 1105 | 10 | Space Jam | November 14, 1999 | 7.0 |
Live-action and animated film Produced by Warner Bros. Animation. Includes a sneak peek of Toy Story 2.
| 1106 | 11 | Jingle All the Way | November 26, 1999 | 7.5 |
Presented under ABC Big Picture Show banner. Produced by 20th Century Fox (later owned by Disney and rebranded as 20th Century Studios).
| 1107 | 12 | The Santa Clause | November 28, 1999 | 10.1 |
| 1108 | 13 | The Year Without a Santa Claus | December 2, 1999 | 6.2 |
Rebroadcast episode.
| 1109 | 14 | A Charlie Brown Christmas | December 3, 1999 | 7.6 |
Rebroadcast episode.
| 1110 | 15 | Snowden's Christmas | December 3, 1999 | 6.5 |
| 1111 | 16 | The Nuttiest Nutcracker | December 3, 1999 | 5.1 |
| 1112 | 17 | Winnie the Pooh and Christmas Too | December 5, 1999 | 6.7 |
Rebroadcast episode from seasons 36, 37, 38, 40, 41, 42 and 43.
| 1113 | 18 | Sesame Street: CinderElmo | December 6, 1999 | 4.1 |
| 1114 | 19 | Frosty the Snowman | December 7, 1999 | 8.4 |
Rebroadcast episode.
| 1115 | 20 | Frosty Returns | December 7, 1999 | 8.4 |
Rebroadcast episode.
| 1116 | 21 | The Story of Santa Claus | December 9, 1999 | 5.4 |
Rebroadcast episode.
| 1117 | 22 | A Garfield Christmas | December 11, 1999 | 4.4 |
Rebroadcast episode.
| 1118 | 23 | Switching Goals | December 12, 1999 | 5.6 |
TV film produced for the series.
| 1119 | 24 | Olive, the Other Reindeer | December 17, 1999 | 6.0 |
| 1120 | 25 | Babe | December 19, 1999 | 6.5 |
| 1121 | 26 | Walt Disney World Christmas Day Parade | December 25, 1999 | 4.5 |
| 1122 | 27 | Wild America | December 26, 1999 | 6.4 |
Produced by Warner Bros.
| 1123 | 28 | George of the Jungle | January 9, 2000 | 9.0 |
| 1124 | 29 | The Loretta Claiborne Story | January 16, 2000 | 7.1 |
| 1125 | 30 | First Kid | January 23, 2000 | 12.5 |
| 1126 | 31 | Flubber | February 4, 2000 | 6.9 |
Rebroadcast episode. Presented under ABC Big Picture Show banner.
| 1127 | 32 | Good Grief, Charlie Brown: A Tribute to Charles Schulz | February 11, 2000 | 6.8 |
| 1128 | 33 | 101 Dalmatians | February 13, 2000 | 7.3 |
| 1129 | 34 | Jungle 2 Jungle | February 20, 2000 | 8.9 |
| 1130 | 35 | Life-Size | March 5, 2000 | 7.9 |
| 1131 | 36 | Model Behavior | March 12, 2000 | 8.1 |
TV film produced for the series.
| 1132 | 37 | The Flintstones | March 19, 2000 | 7.3 |
Presented under ABC Big Picture Show banner. Produced by Universal Pictures, Amblin Entertainment and Hanna-Barbera.
| 1133 | 38 | Mail to the Chief | April 2, 2000 | 5.7 |
| 1134 | 39 | Angels in the Infield | April 9, 2000 | 6.3 |
| 1135 | 40 | Geppetto | May 7, 2000 | 8.0 |
Based on Pinocchio.
| 1136 | 41 | Here's to You, Charlie Brown: 50 Great Years | May 10, 2000 | 4.5 |
| 1137 | 42 | Mulan | May 14, 2000 | 6.1 |
Animated film.
| 1138 | 43 | The Mask | May 21, 2000 | 6.6 |
Produced by New Line Cinema.
| 1139 | 44 | A Kid in King Arthur's Court | May 28, 2000 | 3.7 |
| 1140 | 45 | D3: The Mighty Ducks | June 4, 2000 | 4.2 |
| 1141 | 46 | Gold Diggers: The Secret of Bear Mountain | June 11, 2000 | 6.4 |
Produced by Universal Pictures.
| 1142 | 47 | Kazaam | June 18, 2000 | 4.3 |
| 1143 | 48 | Model Behavior | June 25, 2000 | 4.6 |
| 1144 | 49 | The Adventures of Pinocchio | July 9, 2000 | 3.5 |
| 1145 | 50 | The Pooch and the Pauper | July 16, 2000 | 4.6 |
| 1146 | 51 | Larger than Life | July 23, 2000 | 4.9 |
Produced by United Artists.
| 1147 | 52 | Homeward Bound 2: Lost in San Francisco | July 30, 2000 | 5.6 |
| 1148 | 53 | Rudyard Kipling's The Jungle Book | August 6, 2000 | 5.8 |
| 1149 | 54 | The New Adventures of Spin and Marty: Suspect Behavior | August 13, 2000 | 3.9 |
| 1150 | 55 | Life-Size | August 20, 2000 | 4.5 |
| 1151 | 56 | Houseguest | August 27, 2000 | 4.8 |
| 1152 | 57 | Flipper | September 3, 2000 | 4.1 |
| 1153 | 58 | Space Jam | September 24, 2000 | 4.5 |
Rebroadcast episode. Presented under ABC Big Picture Show banner. Live-action and animated film Produced by Warner Bros. Animation.
| 1154 | 59 | The New Swiss Family Robinson | October 1, 2000 | 9.1 |

=== Season 45 (2000–2001) ===
| No. overall | No. in season | Title | Original release date | U.S. viewers (millions) |
|---|---|---|---|---|
| 1155 | 1 | Mighty Joe Young | October 8, 2000 | 9.6 |
| 1156 | 2 | Sister Act 2: Back in the Habit | October 15, 2000 | 12.7 |
| 1157 | 3 | The Lion King II: Simba's Pride | October 22, 2000 | 11.1 |
Repeated without Walt Disney World and Annie segments. Includes a behind the scenes sneak peek of 102 Dalmatians called On the Set: Tails of 102 Dalmatians.
| 1158 | 4 | Casper | October 29, 2000 | 11.7 |
Rebroadcast episode from seasons 42, 43 and 44. Produced by Universal Pictures and Amblin Entertainment.
| 1159 | 5 | The Growing Pains Movie | November 5, 2000 | 15.0 |
| 1160 | 6 | The Miracle Worker | November 12, 2000 | 17.4 |
| 1161 | 7 | Santa Who? | November 19, 2000 | 16.5 |
| 1162 | 8 | Jingle All the Way | November 25, 2000 | 11.3 |
Rebroadcast episode from season 44. Produced by 20th Century Fox (later owned by Disney and rebranded as 20th Century Studios).
| 1163 | 9 | The Santa Clause | November 26, 2000 | 16.9 |
| 1164 | 10 | Frosty the Snowman | December 2, 2000 | 10.8 |
Rebroadcast episode.
| 1165 | 11 | Frosty Returns | December 2, 2000 | 11.0 |
Rebroadcast episode.
| 1166 | 12 | Winnie the Pooh and Christmas Too | December 3, 2000 | 10.1 |
Rebroadcast episode from seasons 36, 37, 38, 40, 41, 42, 43 and 44.
| 1167 | 13 | The Tangerine Bear: Home in Time for Christmas | December 3, 2000 | 11.0 |
| 1168 | 14 | Mickey's Christmas Carol | December 9, 2000 | 7.4 |
Rebroadcast episode from seasons 31, 32, 33, 34, 35, 36, 38, 39, 40 and 42.
| 1169 | 15 | Annie | December 10, 2000 | 10.6 |
Includes a sneak peek of The Emperor's New Groove.
| 1170 | 16 | A Charlie Brown Christmas | December 11, 2000 | 19.0 |
Rebroadcast episode.
| 1171 | 17 | Snowden's Christmas | December 14, 2000 | 6.4 |
Rebroadcast episode.
| 1172 | 18 | A Garfield Christmas | December 14, 2000 | 7.6 |
Rebroadcast episode.
| 1173 | 19 | Olive, the Other Reindeer | December 14, 2000 | 5.2 |
Rebroadcast episode.
| 1174 | 20 | George of the Jungle | December 17, 2000 | 9.8 |
| 1175 | 21 | The Story of Santa Claus | December 23, 2000 | 6.7 |
Rebroadcast episode.
| 1176 | 22 | The Nuttiest Nutcracker | December 23, 2000 | 6.2 |
Rebroadcast episode.
| 1177 | 23 | Twas the Night Before Christmas with 98 Degrees | December 24, 2000 | 5.3 |
| 1178 | 24 | A Charlie Brown Christmas | December 25, 2000 | 8.4 |
Rebroadcast episode.
| 1179 | 25 | The Mask | January 7, 2001 | 11.5 |
| 1180 | 26 | Jungle 2 Jungle | January 14, 2001 | 10.9 |
| 1181 | 27 | Willy Wonka and the Chocolate Factory | January 21, 2001 | 12.9 |
| 1182 | 28 | Babe | January 28, 2001 | 6.8 |
Produced by Universal Pictures.
| 1183 | 29 | The Parent Trap | February 10, 2001 | 11.7 |
| 1184 | 30 | Dr. Dolittle | February 11, 2001 | 15.6 |
Produced by 20th Century Fox (later owned by Disney and rebranded as 20th Century Studios).
| 1185 | 31 | Dr. Dolittle | February 17, 2001 | 9.4 |
Rebroadcast episode. Produced by 20th Century Fox (later owned by Disney and rebranded as 20th Century Studios).
| 1186 | 32 | Ever After | February 18, 2001 | 10.6 |
Produced by 20th Century Fox (later owned by Disney and rebranded as 20th Century Studios).
| 1187 | 33 | Lady and the Tramp | February 25, 2001 | 14.3 |
Animated film.
| 1188 | 34 | Princess of Thieves | March 11, 2001 | 10.1 |
| 1189 | 35 | Bailey's Mistake | March 18, 2001 | 13.0 |
| 1190 | 36 | Flubber | April 1, 2001 | 9.2 |
| 1191 | 37 | The Miracle Worker | April 15, 2001 | 5.2 |
| 1192 | 38 | Ladies and the Champ | April 22, 2001 | 6.7 |
| 1193 | 39 | Tarzan | April 29, 2001 | 10.6 |
Animated film. Includes a sneak peek of Atlantis: The Lost Empire.
| 1194 | 40 | Ace Ventura: Pet Detective | May 6, 2001 | 8.1 |
Produced by Warner Bros.
| 1195 | 41 | Child Star: The Shirley Temple Story | May 13, 2001 | 12.6 |
| 1196 | 42 | Muppet Treasure Island | May 27, 2001 | 4.0 |
| 1197 | 43 | Harriet the Spy | June 3, 2001 | 5.0 |
Produced by Paramount Pictures and Nickelodeon Movies.
| 1198 | 44 | Walt Disney World Summer Jam Concert | June 10, 2001 | 2.8 |
| 1199 | 45 | Atlantis: The Search for the Lost Empire | June 10, 2001 | 7.5 |
| 1200 | 46 | The Growing Pains Movie | June 24, 2001 | 4.5 |
| 1201 | 47 | Gold Diggers: The Secret of Bear Mountain | July 1, 2001 | 6.5 |
| 1202 | 48 | Eddie | July 8, 2001 | 7.8 |
Produced by Hollywood Pictures.
| 1203 | 49 | Goldrush: A Real Life Alaskan Adventure | July 15, 2001 | 5.4 |
| 1204 | 50 | Homeward Bound 2: Lost in San Francisco | July 22, 2001 | 6.3 |
| 1205 | 51 | Casper | July 29, 2001 | 6.3 |
Repeat under The Wonderful World of Disney banner.
| 1206 | 52 | Ed | August 5, 2001 | 5.9 |
Produced by Universal Pictures.
| 1207 | 53 | Free Willy 3: The Rescue | August 12, 2001 | 6.5 |
Produced by Warner Bros.
| 1208 | 54 | Tom and Huck | August 19, 2001 | 6.4 |
| 1209 | 55 | A Very Brady Sequel | September 2, 2001 | 4.4 |
Produced by Paramount Pictures.
| 1210 | 56 | Lizzie McGuire/Even Stevens | September 9, 2001 | 2.5 |

=== Season 46 (2001–2002) ===
| No. overall | No. in season | Title | Original release date | U.S. viewers (millions) |
|---|---|---|---|---|
| 1211 | 1 | Walt: The Man Behind the Myth | September 16, 2001 | 4.2 |
| 1212 | 2 | The Mask | September 23, 2001 | 4.8 |
Produced by New Line Cinema.
| 1213 | 3 | A Bug's Life | September 30, 2001 | 11.8 |
Animated film produced by Pixar.
| 1214 | 4 | The Emperor's New Groove | October 14, 2001 | 13.1 |
Animated film. Includes Snow White and the Seven Dwarfs featurette presented by Kelly Ripa.
| 1215 | 5 | Liar Liar | October 21, 2001 | 11.2 |
Produced by Universal Pictures and Imagine Entertainment.
| 1216 | 6 | Toy Story | October 28, 2001 | 11.4 |
Animated film produced by Pixar. Rebroadcast episode from season 42.
| 1217 | 7 | It's the Great Pumpkin, Charlie Brown | October 30, 2001 | 12.6 |
Rebroadcast episode.
| 1218 | 8 | Boo to You Too! Winnie the Pooh | October 30, 2001 | 11.3 |
Rebroadcast episode from seasons 41 and 43.
| 1219 | 9 | Toy Story 2 | November 4, 2001 | 14.8 |
Animated film produced by Pixar.
| 1220 | 10 | Saving Private Ryan | November 11, 2001 | 17.9 |
Produced by DreamWorks Pictures, Paramount Pictures, and Amblin Entertainment.
| 1221 | 11 | A Charlie Brown Thanksgiving | November 16, 2001 | 9.5 |
Rebroadcast episode.
| 1222 | 12 | A Winnie the Pooh Thanksgiving | November 16, 2001 | 9.5 |
Rebroadcast episode from season 43.
| 1223 | 13 | The Facts of Life Reunion | November 18, 2001 | 11.5 |
| 1224 | 14 | A Charlie Brown Thanksgiving | November 22, 2001 | 5.2 |
Rebroadcast episode.
| 1225 | 15 | The Rugrats Movie | November 23, 2001 | 6.0 |
Produced by Paramount Pictures, Nickelodeon Movies, and Klasky Csupo.
| 1226 | 16 | The Santa Clause | November 25, 2001 | 15.7 |
| 1227 | 17 | Frosty the Snowman | November 30, 2001 | 12.0 |
Rebroadcast episode.
| 1228 | 18 | Frosty Returns | November 30, 2001 | 12.2 |
Rebroadcast episode.
| 1229 | 17 | Brian's Song | December 2, 2001 | 15.2 |
| 1230 | 18 | A Charlie Brown Christmas | December 6, 2001 | 11.2 |
Rebroadcast episode. A 1-hour presentation. Includes the 2001 documentary The Making of A Charlie Brown Christmas.
| 1231 | 21 | The Parent Trap | December 8, 2001 | 9.2 |
| 1232 | 22 | Santa Who? | December 9, 2001 | 10.5 |
| 1233 | 23 | The Story of Santa Claus | December 14, 2001 | 6.6 |
Rebroadcast episode.
| 1234 | 24 | Winnie the Pooh and Christmas Too | December 16, 2001 | 8.3 |
Rebroadcast episode. Rebroadcast episode from seasons 36, 37, 38, 40, 41, 42, 43, 44 and 45. Including The New Adventures of Winnie the Pooh episode "Magic Earmuffs".
| 1235 | 25 | A Charlie Brown Christmas | December 16, 2001 | 11.4 |
Rebroadcast episode. A 1-hour presentation. Includes the 2001 documentary The Making of A Charlie Brown Christmas.
| 1236 | 26 | Jingle All the Way | December 23, 2001 | 10.8 |
Rebroadcast episode from seasons 44 and 45. Produced by 20th Century Fox (later owned by Disney and rebranded as 20th Century Studios).
| 1237 | 27 | Ernest Saves Christmas | December 24, 2001 | 5.2 |
Rebroadcast episode. Produced by Touchstone Pictures.
| 1238 | 28 | Jack | December 30, 2001 | 9.0 |
Produced by Hollywood Pictures.
| 1239 | 29 | Dr. Dolittle | January 6, 2002 | 11.7 |
Rebroadcast episode. Produced by 20th Century Fox (later owned by Disney and rebranded as 20th Century Studios).
| 1240 | 30 | George of the Jungle | January 13, 2002 | 11.4 |
| 1241 | 31 | Mary Poppins | January 19, 2002 | 8.3 |
| 1242 | 32 | 101 Dalmatians | January 20, 2002 | 9.3 |
| 1243 | 33 | Mouse Hunt | January 27, 2002 | 10.4 |
Produced by DreamWorks Pictures.
| 1244 | 34 | Pocahontas | February 3, 2002 | 5.0 |
| 1245 | 35 | Ace Ventura: Pet Detective | February 10, 2002 | 8.8 |
Produced by Warner Bros.
| 1246 | 36 | Ace Ventura: When Nature Calls | February 11, 2002 | 5.9 |
Produced by Warner Bros.
| 1247 | 37 | Be My Valentine, Charlie Brown | February 14, 2002 | 10.1 |
Rebroadcast episode.
| 1248 | 38 | Winnie the Pooh: A Valentine for You | February 14, 2002 | 8.0 |
Rebroadcast episode from season 43.
| 1249 | 39 | Raiders of the Lost Ark | February 17, 2002 | 7.5 |
Produced by Paramount Pictures and Lucasfilm.
| 1250 | 40 | Indiana Jones and the Temple of Doom | February 18, 2002 | 7.8 |
Produced by Paramount Pictures and Lucasfilm.
| 1251 | 41 | Tarzan | February 24, 2002 | 8.8 |
Animated film; repeated without Atlantis: The Lost Empire sneak peek.
| 1252 | 42 | Cinderella / Rodgers and Hammerstein's Cinderella | March 3, 2002 | 12.3 |
Animated film. Includes a sneak peek of Cinderella II: Dreams Come True.
| 1253 | 43 | Confessions of an Ugly Stepsister | March 10, 2002 | 9.1 |
| 1254 | 44 | Snow White: The Fairest of Them All | March 17, 2002 | 11.0 |
| 1255 | 45 | October Sky | April 7, 2002 | 7.8 |
Produced by Universal Pictures.
| 1256 | 46 | Small Soldiers | April 14, 2002 | 5.3 |
Produced by DreamWorks Pictures and Universal Pictures.
| 1257 | 47 | Armageddon | April 27, 2002 | 8.2 |
Produced by Touchstone Pictures.
| 1258 | 48 | The Sixth Sense | April 28, 2002 | 10.1 |
Produced by Hollywood Pictures.
| 1259 | 49 | The Sixth Sense | May 4, 2002 | 6.4 |
Rebroadcast episode. Produced by Hollywood Pictures.
| 1260 | 50 | Stuart Little | May 5, 2002 | 7.0 |
Produced by Columbia Pictures.
| 1261 | 51 | Dinotopia (Part 1) | May 12, 2002 | 17.0 |
Live-action and CGI mini-series.
| 1262 | 52 | Dinotopia (Part 2) | May 13, 2002 | 13.4 |
Live-action and CGI mini-series.
| 1263 | 53 | Dinotopia (Part 3) | May 14, 2002 | 12.7 |
Live-action and CGI mini-series.
| 1264 | 54 | Dinosaur | May 19, 2002 | 9.1 |
CGI animated film.
| 1265 | 55 | Switching Goals | May 26, 2002 | 3.8 |
| 1266 | 56 | The New Swiss Family Robinson | June 2, 2002 | 8.1 |
| 1267 | 57 | A Knight in Camelot | June 9, 2002 | 5.1 |
| 1268 | 58 | Toy Story | June 16, 2002 | 4.9 |
Animated film produced by Pixar. Rebroadcast episode from season 42. Includes a sneak peek of Lilo & Stitch.
| 1269 | 59 | Ruby Bridges | June 23, 2002 | 5.3 |
| 1270 | 60 | The 6th Man | June 30, 2002 | 4.8 |
| 1271 | 61 | Buddy | July 7, 2002 | 4.2 |
Produced by Columbia Pictures and Jim Henson Pictures.
| 1272 | 62 | Cadet Kelly | July 14, 2002 | N/A |
| 1273 | 63 | First Kid | July 28, 2002 | N/A |
| 1274 | 64 | A Saintly Switch | August 4, 2002 | N/A |
| 1275 | 65 | Peter Pan | August 11, 2002 | N/A |
Animated film
| 1276 | 66 | Toy Story 2 | October 6, 2002 | N/A |
Animated film produced by Pixar
| 1277 | 67 | Dr. Dolittle | October 13, 2002 | N/A |
Rebroadcast episode. Produced by 20th Century Fox (later owned by Disney and rebranded as 20th Century Studios)
| 1278 | 68 | Liar Liar | October 20, 2002 | N/A |
Produced by Universal Pictures and Imagine Entertainment
| 1279 | 69 | A Bug's Life | October 27, 2002 | N/A |
Animated film produced by Pixar

=== Season 47 (2002–2003) ===
| No. overall | No. in season | Title | Original release date |
|---|---|---|---|
| 1280 | 1 | Home Alone 4: Taking Back the House | November 3, 2002 |
| 1281 | 2 | Beauty and the Beast | November 10, 2002 |
Presented by Robby Benson. Includes a sneak peek of Treasure Planet.
| 1282 | 3 | Mr. St. Nick | November 17, 2002 |
| 1283 | 4 | The Santa Clause | November 24, 2002 |
| 1284 | 5 | Pinocchio | December 1, 2002 |
Animated film
| 1285 | 6 | Nancy Drew | December 15, 2002 |
Initially scheduled to air October 20.
| 1286 | 7 | I'll Be Home for Christmas | December 22, 2002 |
| 1287 | 8 | One Hundred and One Dalmatians | January 12, 2003 |
Animated film.
| 1288 | 9 | Sounder | January 19, 2003 |
| 1289 | 10 | Inspector Gadget | February 9, 2003 |
Based in DIC animated series of same name. Includes a sneak peek of Inspector Gadget 2.
| 1290 | 11 | Meredith Willson's The Music Man | February 16, 2003 |
| 1291 | 12 | Tarzan | March 9, 2003 |
| 1292 | 13 | The Emperor's New Groove | March 16, 2003 |
| 1293 | 14 | Disney's The Kid | March 30, 2003 |
| 1294 | 15 | Atlantis: The Lost Empire | April 6, 2003 |
Animated film.
| 1295 | 16 | Dr. Dolittle | April 13, 2003 |
| 1296 | 17 | Eloise at the Plaza | April 27, 2003 |
Live-action and animated film.
| 1297 | 18 | Toy Story | May 25, 2003 |
Animated film produced by Pixar; Rebroadcast episode from seasons 42 and 46. Includes a sneak peek of Finding Nemo
| 1298 | 19 | Ever After | June 1, 2003 |
Produced by 20th Century Fox (later owned by Disney and rebranded as 20th Century Studios)
| 1299 | 20 | 101 Dalmatians | June 22, 2003 |
| 1300 | 21 | Inside the Osmonds | June 29, 2003 |
| 1301 | 22 | Dinosaur | July 6, 2003 |
| 1302 | 23 | The New Swiss Family Robinson | July 13, 2003 |
| 1303 | 24 | Small Soldiers | July 20, 2003 |
| 1304 | 25 | The Pennsylvania Miners' Story | July 27, 2003 |
| 1305 | 26 | Paulie | August 3, 2003 |
Produced by DreamWorks Pictures
| 1306 | 27 | Angels in the Infield | August 10, 2003 |
| 1307 | 28 | Chitty Chitty Bang Bang | August 31, 2003 |
Produced by United Artists
| 1308 | 29 | City Slickers | September 7, 2003 |
Produced by Castle Rock Entertainment

=== Season 48 (2003–2004) ===
| No. overall | No. in season | Title | Original release date |
|---|---|---|---|
| 1309 | 1 | Remember the Titans | September 27, 2003 |
| 1310 | 2 | Lilo & Stitch | October 4, 2003 |
Animated film.
| 1311 | 3 | Toy Story | October 11, 2003 |
Animated film produced by Pixar; Rebroadcast episode from seasons 42, 46 and 47.
| 1312 | 4 | Toy Story 2 | October 18, 2003 |
Animated film produced by Pixar
| 1313 | 5 | Sleeping Beauty | October 25, 2003 |
Animated film
| 1314 | 6 | Phenomenon II | November 1, 2003 |
| 1315 | 7 | 102 Dalmatians | November 8, 2003 |
| 1316 | 8 | The Challenge | November 15, 2003 |
| 1317 | 9 | Eloise at Christmastime | November 22, 2003 |
Live-Action & animated film.
| 1318 | 10 | I'll Be Home for Christmas | December 13, 2003 |
| 1319 | 11 | Mickey Mouse Celebration | December 20, 2003 |
Animated compilation film and TV special.
| 1320 | 12 | The Santa Clause | December 20, 2003 |
| 1321 | 13 | The Sound of Music | December 27, 2003 |
Rebroadcast episode from season 38. Produced by 20th Century Fox (later owned by Disney and rebranded as 20th Century Studios) and Argyle Enterprises
| 1322 | 14 | Liar Liar | January 17, 2004 |
Produced by Universal Pictures and Imagine Entertainment
| 1323 | 15 | A Bug's Life | January 24, 2004 |
Animated film produced by Pixar
| 1324 | 16 | The Parent Trap | January 31, 2004 |
| 1325 | 17 | The Lion King: Special Edition | February 7, 2004 |
Presented by Meredith Vieira. Includes a sneak peek of The Lion King 1 1/2
| 1326 | 18 | The Princess Diaries | February 14, 2004 |
| 1327 | 19 | Cast Away | February 21, 2004 |
Produced by 20th Century Fox (later owned by Disney and rebranded as 20th Century Studios) and DreamWorks Pictures
| 1328 | 20 | Dr. Dolittle | March 13, 2004 |
Produced by 20th Century Fox (later owned by Disney and rebranded as 20th Century Studios)
| 1329 | 21 | Tarzan | March 20, 2004 |
| 1330 | 22 | The Emperor's New Groove | April 3, 2004 |
Includes a sneak peek of Home on the Range
| 1331 | 23 | Remember the Titans | May 1, 2004 |
| 1332 | 24 | A Wrinkle in Time | May 10, 2004 |
| 1333 | 25 | Meredith Willson's The Music Man | July 4, 2004 |
| 1334 | 26 | Princess of Thieves | July 10, 2004 |
| 1335 | 27 | The Miracle Worker | July 17, 2004 |
| 1336 | 28 | Disney's The Kid | August 14, 2004 |
| 1337 | 29 | The Road to El Dorado | August 21, 2004 |
Animated film produced by DreamWorks Animation
| 1338 | 30 | Dinosaur | September 4, 2004 |
CGI animated film.
| 1339 | 31 | Liar Liar | October 9, 2004 |
Produced by Universal Pictures and Imagine Entertainment

=== Season 49 (2004–2005) ===
| No. overall | No. in season | Title | Original release date |
|---|---|---|---|
| 1340 | 1 | Growing Pains: Return of the Seavers | October 16, 2004 |
| 1341 | 2 | Monsters, Inc. | October 30, 2004 |
Animated film produced by Pixar; Preceded by a showing of It's the Great Pumpkin, Charlie Brown; Includes a sneak peek of The Incredibles
| 1342 | 3 | Harry Potter and the Sorcerer's Stone | November 13, 2004 |
Produced by Warner Bros.
| 1343 | 4 | The Rookie | November 20, 2004 |
| 1344 | 5 | Naughty or Nice | December 11, 2004 |
| 1345 | 6 | Remember the Titans | December 18, 2004 |
| 1346 | 7 | The Santa Clause | December 23, 2004 |
| 1347 | 8 | I'll Be Home for Christmas | December 24, 2004 |
Presented under the ABC Friday Movie of the Week banner
| 1348 | 9 | The Sound of Music | December 25, 2004 |
Produced by 20th Century Fox (later owned by Disney and rebranded as 20th Century Studios) and Argyle Enterprises
| 1349 | 10 | Little House on the Prairie (Parts 1 & 2) | March 26, 2005 |
| 1350 | 11 | Little House on the Prairie (Part 3) | April 2, 2005 |
| 1351 | 12 | Little House on the Prairie (Part 4) | April 9, 2005 |
| 1352 | 13 | Little House on the Prairie (Part 5) | April 16, 2005 |
| 1353 | 14 | Little House on the Prairie (Part 6) | April 23, 2005 |
| 1354 | 15 | The Muppets' Wizard of Oz | May 20, 2005 |
| 1355 | 16 | Bambi | June 4, 2005 |
Animated film.
| 1356 | 17 | Tarzan | June 11, 2005 |
| 1357 | 18 | Lilo & Stitch | June 18, 2005 |
| 1358 | 19 | Pocahontas | June 25, 2005 |
| 1359 | 20 | Toy Story | June 30, 2005 |
Animated film produced by Pixar; Rebroadcast episode from seasons 42, 46, 47 and 48.
| 1360 | 21 | The Emperor's New Groove | July 9, 2005 |
Animated film
| 1361 | 22 | The Princess Diaries | July 16, 2005 |
| 1362 | 23 | Monsters, Inc. | October 29, 2005 |
Animated film produced by Pixar

=== Season 50 (2005–2006) ===
| No. overall | No. in season | Title | Original release date |
|---|---|---|---|
| 1363 | 1 | Pirates of the Caribbean: The Curse of the Black Pearl | November 3, 2005 |
| 1364 | 2 | Harry Potter and the Chamber of Secrets | November 19, 2005 |
Produced by Warner Bros.
| 1365 | 3 | Finding Nemo | November 24, 2005 |
Animated film produced by Pixar; Preceded by a showing of A Charlie Brown Thanksgiving; Includes a sneak peek of The Chronicles of Narnia: The Lion, the Witch and the Wardrobe
| 1366 | 4 | The Santa Clause | December 15, 2005 |
| 1367 | 5 | The Sound of Music | December 17, 2005 |
Produced by 20th Century Fox (later owned by Disney and rebranded as 20th Century Studios) and Argyle Enterprises
| 1368 | 6 | Once Upon a Mattress | December 18, 2005 |
| 1369 | 7 | I'll Be Home for Christmas | December 24, 2005 |
| 1370 | 8 | Snow Dogs | December 31, 2005 |
| 1371 | 9 | Enemy of the State | January 21, 2006 |
Produced by Touchstone Pictures
| 1372 | 10 | Road to Perdition | January 28, 2006 |
Produced by DreamWorks Pictures
| 1373 | 11 | Harry Potter and the Sorcerer's Stone | February 4, 2006 |
Produced by Warner Bros.
| 1374 | 12 | The Green Mile | February 11, 2006 |
Produced by Castle Rock Entertainment and Darkwoods Productions
| 1375 | 13 | Cast Away | February 18, 2006 |
Produced by 20th Century Fox (later owned by Disney and rebranded as 20th Century Studios) and DreamWorks Pictures
| 1376 | 14 | Forrest Gump | February 25, 2006 |
Produced by Paramount Pictures and The Tisch Company
| 1377 | 15 | Sweet Home Alabama | March 2, 2006 |
Produced by Touchstone Pictures
| 1378 | 16 | A Beautiful Mind | March 4, 2006 |
Produced by DreamWorks Pictures and Universal Pictures.
| 1379 | 17 | Bringing Down the House | March 9, 2006 |
Produced by Touchstone Pictures
| 1380 | 18 | What Lies Beneath | March 11, 2006 |
Produced by DreamWorks Pictures
| 1381 | 19 | The Sixth Sense | March 18, 2006 |
Produced by Hollywood Pictures
| 1382 | 20 | Signs | March 25, 2006 |
Produced by Touchstone Pictures
| 1383 | 21 | Minority Report | April 8, 2006 |
Produced by 20th Century Fox (later owned by Disney and rebranded as 20th Century Studios) and DreamWorks Pictures
| 1384 | 22 | Pretty Woman | April 22, 2006 |
| 1385 | 23 | Pearl Harbor | April 29, 2006 |
| 1386 | 24 | Seabiscuit | May 6, 2006 |
Produced by DreamWorks Pictures and Universal Pictures.
| 1387 | 25 | Remember the Titans | May 20, 2006 |
| 1388 | 26 | Freaky Friday | May 26, 2006 |
| 1389 | 27 | Enemy of the State | May 27, 2006 |
Produced by Touchstone Pictures
| 1390 | 28 | Toy Story | June 3, 2006 |
Animated film produced by Pixar; Rebroadcast episode from seasons 42, 46, 47, 48 and 49.
| 1391 | 29 | Toy Story 2 | June 10, 2006 |
Animated film produced by Pixar
| 1392 | 30 | Lady and the Tramp | June 17, 2006 |
Animated film.
| 1393 | 31 | A Bug's Life | June 24, 2006 |
Animated film produced by Pixar
| 1394 | 32 | Lilo & Stitch | July 1, 2006 |
Animated film.
| 1395 | 33 | The Princess Diaries | July 8, 2006 |
| 1396 | 34 | Unbreakable | July 15, 2006 |
Produced by Touchstone Pictures
| 1397 | 35 | The Rookie | July 22, 2006 |
| 1398 | 36 | Practical Magic | July 29, 2006 |
Produced by Warner Bros. and Village Roadshow Pictures
| 1399 | 37 | The Recruit | August 5, 2006 |
| 1400 | 38 | Coyote Ugly | August 12, 2006 |
| 1401 | 39 | Cast Away | August 19, 2006 |
Produced by 20th Century Fox (later owned by Disney and rebranded as 20th Century Studios) and DreamWorks Pictures
| 1402 | 40 | Pearl Harbor | August 26, 2006 |
Produced by Touchstone Pictures
| 1403 | 41 | Pirates of the Caribbean: The Curse of the Black Pearl | August 27, 2006 |
| 1404 | 42 | Harry Potter and the Chamber of Secrets | October 21, 2006 |
Produced by Warner Bros.
| 1405 | 43 | Harry Potter and the Prisoner of Azkaban | October 28, 2006 |
Produced by Warner Bros.
| 1406 | 44 | The Polar Express | December 1, 2006 |
Produced by Warner Bros.
| 1407 | 45 | How the Grinch Stole Christmas | December 9, 2006 |
Produced by Universal Pictures and Imagine Entertainment

=== Season 51 (2006–2007) ===
| No. overall | No. in season | Title | Original release date |
|---|---|---|---|
| 1408 | 1 | Finding Nemo | December 16, 2006 |
Animated film produced by Pixar; Repeated without The Chronicles of Narnia: The Lion, the Witch and the Wardrobe sneak peek
| 1409 | 2 | The Santa Clause 2 | December 17, 2006 |
Preceded by a showing of A Charlie Brown Christmas
| 1410 | 3 | The Sound of Music | December 23, 2006 |
Produced by 20th Century Fox (later owned by Disney and rebranded as 20th Century Studios) and Argyle Enterprises
| 1411 | 4 | Pirates of the Caribbean: The Curse of the Black Pearl | December 25, 2006 |
| 1412 | 5 | The Terminal | January 13, 2007 |
Produced by DreamWorks Pictures and Amblin Entertainment
| 1413 | 6 | Seabiscuit | January 20, 2007 |
Produced by DreamWorks Pictures and Universal Pictures.
| 1414 | 7 | Catch Me If You Can | January 27, 2007 |
Produced by DreamWorks Pictures and Amblin Entertainment
| 1415 | 8 | Anchorman: The Legend of Ron Burgundy | February 3, 2007 |
Produced by DreamWorks Pictures and Apatow Productions
| 1416 | 9 | Old School | February 4, 2007 |
Produced by DreamWorks Pictures and The Montecito Picture Company
| 1417 | 10 | Bringing Down the House | February 10, 2007 |
Produced by Touchstone Pictures
| 1418 | 11 | Cast Away | February 17, 2007 |
Produced by 20th Century Fox (later owned by Disney and rebranded as 20th Century Studios) and DreamWorks Pictures
| 1419 | 12 | Forrest Gump | February 24, 2007 |
Produced by Paramount Pictures and The Tisch Company
| 1420 | 13 | Head of State | March 3, 2007 |
Produced by DreamWorks Pictures and 3 Arts Entertainment
| 1421 | 14 | The Sixth Sense | March 10, 2007 |
Produced by Hollywood Pictures
| 1422 | 15 | Legally Blonde 2: Red, White & Blonde | March 17, 2007 |
Produced by Metro-Goldwyn-Mayer Pictures
| 1423 | 16 | Coyote Ugly | March 24, 2007 |
Produced by Touchstone Pictures
| 1424 | 17 | The Rookie | March 31, 2007 |
| 1425 | 18 | Harry Potter and the Sorcerer's Stone | April 21, 2007 |
Produced by Warner Bros.
| 1426 | 19 | Pearl Harbor | April 28, 2007 |
Produced by Touchstone Pictures
| 1427 | 20 | Meet the Fockers | May 5, 2007 |
Produced by DreamWorks Pictures and Universal Pictures.
| 1428 | 21 | The Pacifier | May 19, 2007 |
| 1429 | 22 | Minority Report | June 2, 2007 |
Produced by 20th Century Fox (later owned by Disney and rebranded as 20th Century Studios) and DreamWorks Pictures
| 1430 | 23 | Pirates of the Caribbean: The Curse of the Black Pearl | June 16, 2007 |
| 1431 | 24 | Finding Nemo | June 23, 2007 |
Animated film produced by Pixar; Included a sneak peek of Ratatouille, as well as a look at Nemo-themed attractions at Disney's theme parks hosted by Apolo Anton Ohno.
| 1432 | 25 | The Haunted Mansion | June 30, 2007 |
| 1433 | 26 | Monsters, Inc. | July 7, 2007 |
Animated film produced by Pixar; Included a sneak peek of Disney's The Jungle Book 40th Anniversary Platinum Edition DVD.
| 1434 | 27 | Freaky Friday | July 14, 2007 |
Included the behind the scenes look at High School Musical: The Concert.
| 1435 | 28 | The Princess Diaries | July 21, 2007 |
| 1436 | 29 | The Princess Diaries 2: Royal Engagement | July 28, 2007 |
| 1437 | 30 | Confessions of a Teenage Drama Queen | August 4, 2007 |
| 1438 | 31 | Win a Date with Tad Hamilton | August 18, 2007 |
Produced by DreamWorks Pictures and Red Wagon Entertainment.
| 1439 | 32 | The Cat in the Hat | August 25, 2007 |
| 1440 | 33 | Meet the Fockers | September 9, 2007 |
| 1441 | 34 | Anchorman: The Legend of Ron Burgundy | September 16, 2007 |
Produced by DreamWorks Pictures and Apatow Productions
| 1442 | 35 | The Polar Express | November 30, 2007 |
Produced by Warner Bros.
| 1443 | 36 | How the Grinch Stole Christmas | December 8, 2007 |
Produced by Universal Pictures and Imagine Entertainment
| 1444 | 37 | Surviving Christmas | December 15, 2007 |
Produced by DreamWorks Pictures.

=== Season 52 (2007–2008) ===
| No. overall | No. in season | Title | Original release date |
|---|---|---|---|
| 1445 | 1 | Lemony Snicket's A Series of Unfortunate Events | December 22, 2007 |
Produced by Paramount Pictures
| 1446 | 2 | The Santa Clause 2 | December 23, 2007 |
| 1447 | 3 | Madagascar | December 24, 2007 |
Produced by DreamWorks Animation.
| 1448 | 4 | Pirates of the Caribbean: The Curse of the Black Pearl | December 25, 2007 |
| 1449 | 5 | The Sound of Music | December 30, 2007 |
Produced by 20th Century Fox (later owned by Disney and rebranded as 20th Century Studios) and Argyle Enterprises
| 1450 | 6 | Pearl Harbor | January 12, 2008 |
Produced by Touchstone Pictures
| 1451 | 7 | The Terminal | January 19, 2008 |
Produced by DreamWorks Pictures and Amblin Entertainment
| 1452 | 8 | Pretty Woman | January 26, 2008 |
Produced by Touchstone Pictures
| 1453 | 9 | War of the Worlds | February 2, 2008 |
Produced by Paramount Pictures, DreamWorks Pictures and Amblin Entertainment
| 1454 | 10 | Meet the Fockers | February 3, 2008 |
Produced by DreamWorks Pictures and Universal Pictures.
| 1455 | 11 | Charlie and the Chocolate Factory | February 9, 2008 |
Produced by Warner Bros. and Village Roadshow Pictures.
| 1456 | 12 | Miracle | February 16, 2008 |
| 1457 | 13 | Forrest Gump | February 23, 2008 |
Produced by Paramount Pictures and The Tisch Company
| 1458 | 14 | Old School | March 1, 2008 |
Produced by DreamWorks Pictures and The Montecito Picture Company
| 1459 | 15 | Road to Perdition | March 8, 2008 |
Produced by DreamWorks Pictures
| 1460 | 16 | Catch Me If You Can | March 29, 2008 |
Produced by DreamWorks Pictures and Amblin Entertainment
| 1461 | 17 | Harry Potter and the Sorcerer's Stone | April 5, 2008 |
| 1462 | 18 | Harry Potter and the Chamber of Secrets | April 12, 2008 |
| 1463 | 19 | Harry Potter and the Prisoner of Azkaban | April 19, 2008 |
| 1464 | 20 | Harry Potter and the Goblet of Fire | April 26, 2008 |
| 1465 | 21 | The Chronicles of Narnia: The Lion, the Witch and the Wardrobe | May 3, 2008 |
| 1466 | 22 | The Rookie | May 31, 2008 |
| 1467 | 23 | Finding Nemo | June 7, 2008 |
Animated film produced by Pixar
| 1468 | 24 | Monsters, Inc. | June 14, 2008 |
Animated film produced by Pixar
| 1469 | 25 | Camp Rock | June 21, 2008 |
| 1470 | 26 | The Haunted Mansion | June 28, 2008 |
| 1471 | 27 | Confessions of a Teenage Drama Queen | July 5, 2008 |
| 1472 | 28 | The Princess Diaries 2: Royal Engagement | July 12, 2008 |
| 1473 | 29 | Freaky Friday | July 19, 2008 |
| 1474 | 30 | Peter Pan | July 26, 2008 |
Animated film; included a sneak peek of Tinker Bell
| 1475 | 31 | Lemony Snicket's A Series of Unfortunate Events | August 1, 2008 |
Produced by Paramount Pictures
| 1476 | 32 | War of the Worlds | August 8, 2008 |
Produced by Paramount Pictures, DreamWorks Pictures and Amblin Entertainment
| 1477 | 33 | Legally Blonde | August 15, 2008 |
| 1478 | 34 | Legally Blonde 2: Red, White & Blonde | August 22, 2008 |
| 1479 | 35 | Collateral | August 29, 2008 |
Produced by DreamWorks Pictures
| 1480 | 36 | The Polar Express | November 28, 2008 |
Produced by Warner Bros.
| 1481 | 37 | How the Grinch Stole Christmas | December 5, 2008 |
Produced by Universal Pictures and Imagine Entertainment
| 1482 | 38 | Surviving Christmas | December 13, 2008 |
Produced by DreamWorks Pictures.
| 1483 | 39 | The Santa Clause 2 | December 14, 2008 |
| 1484 | 40 | The Cat in the Hat | December 20, 2008 |
Produced by DreamWorks Pictures and Universal Pictures.
| 1485 | 41 | Charlie and the Chocolate Factory | December 22, 2008 |
Produced by Warner Bros. and Village Roadshow Pictures.
| 1486 | 42 | The Chronicles of Narnia: The Lion, the Witch and the Wardrobe | December 24, 2008 |
| 1487 | 43 | Miracle | December 27, 2008 |
| 1488 | 44 | The Sound of Music | December 28, 2008 |
Produced by 20th Century Fox (later owned by Disney and rebranded as 20th Century Studios) and Argyle Enterprises
| 1489 | 45 | Pirates of the Caribbean: The Curse of the Black Pearl | December 29, 2008 |

=== Season 55 (2009) ===
| No. overall | No. in season | Title | Original release date |
|---|---|---|---|
| 1490 | 1 | Harry Potter and the Sorcerer's Stone | April 18, 2009 |
| 1491 | 2 | Harry Potter and the Chamber of Secrets | April 25, 2009 |
| 1492 | 3 | Harry Potter and the Prisoner of Azkaban | May 2, 2009 |
| 1493 | 4 | Happy Feet | May 8, 2009 |
| 1494 | 5 | Harry Potter and the Goblet of Fire | May 16, 2009 |
| 1495 | 6 | Pirates of the Caribbean: Dead Man's Chest | May 20, 2009 |
| 1496 | 7 | The Haunted Mansion | June 13, 2009 |
| 1497 | 8 | Finding Nemo | August 8, 2009 |
Animated film produced by Pixar
| 1498 | 9 | The Santa Clause 2 | December 19, 2009 |
| 1499 | 10 | The Santa Clause 3: The Escape Clause | December 20, 2009 |
| 1500 | 11 | Pirates of the Caribbean: Dead Man's Chest | December 25, 2009 |
| 1501 | 12 | The Sound of Music | December 27, 2009 |
Produced by 20th Century Fox (later owned by Disney and rebranded as 20th Century Studios) and Argyle Enterprises
| 1502 | 13 | Pirates of the Caribbean: At World's End | December 28, 2009 |

=== Season 56 (2010) ===
| No. overall | No. in season | Title | Original release date |
|---|---|---|---|
| 1503 | 1 | Harry Potter and the Sorcerer's Stone | February 6, 2010 |
Produced by Warner Bros.
| 1504 | 2 | Harry Potter and the Chamber of Secrets | February 13, 2010 |
Produced by Warner Bros.
| 1505 | 3 | Meet the Fockers | February 19, 2010 |
Produced by DreamWorks Pictures and Universal Pictures.
| 1506 | 4 | Harry Potter and the Prisoner of Azkaban | February 20, 2010 |
Produced by Warner Bros.
| 1507 | 5 | Harry Potter and the Order of the Phoenix | February 27, 2010 |
Produced by Warner Bros.
| 1508 | 6 | Meet the Fockers | May 1, 2010 |
Produced by DreamWorks Pictures and Universal Pictures.
| 1509 | 7 | The Game Plan | July 24, 2010 |
| 1510 | 8 | Meet the Fockers | August 28, 2010 |
Produced by DreamWorks Pictures and Universal Pictures.
| 1511 | 9 | Happy Feet | November 26, 2010 |
Produced by Warner Bros. and Village Roadshow Pictures
| 1512 | 10 | Phineas and Ferb Christmas Vacation | December 6, 2010 |
| 1513 | 11 | The Chronicles of Narnia: The Lion, the Witch and the Wardrobe | December 11, 2010 |
| 1514 | 12 | Madagascar | December 18, 2010 |
Produced by DreamWorks Animation.
| 1515 | 13 | The Santa Clause 2 | December 19, 2010 |
| 1516 | 14 | The Santa Clause 3: The Escape Clause | December 19, 2010 |
| 1517 | 15 | How the Grinch Stole Christmas | December 23, 2010 |
Produced by Universal Pictures and Imagine Entertainment
| 1518 | 16 | The Santa Clause 2 | December 24, 2010 |
| 1519 | 17 | The Sound of Music | December 26, 2010 |
Produced by 20th Century Fox (later owned by Disney and rebranded as 20th Century Studios) and Argyle Enterprises
| 1520 | 18 | Charlie and the Chocolate Factory | December 27, 2010 |
Produced by Warner Bros. and Village Roadshow Pictures.

=== Season 57 (2011) ===
| No. overall | No. in season | Title | Original release date |
|---|---|---|---|
| 1521 | 1 | Dreamgirls | January 29, 2011 |
Produced by Paramount Pictures and DreamWorks Pictures
| 1522 | 2 | Over the Hedge | February 19, 2011 |
Produced by Paramount Pictures and DreamWorks Animation
| 1523 | 3 | War of the Worlds | April 9, 2011 |
Produced by Paramount Pictures, DreamWorks Pictures and Amblin Entertainment
| 1524 | 4 | Pirates of the Caribbean: Dead Man's Chest | April 16, 2011 |
| 1525 | 5 | Pirates of the Caribbean: At World's End | May 14, 2011 |
| 1526 | 6 | Harry Potter and the Sorcerer's Stone | July 23, 2011 |
Produced by Warner Bros.
| 1527 | 7 | Harry Potter and the Chamber of Secrets | July 30, 2011 |
Produced by Warner Bros.
| 1528 | 8 | Harry Potter and the Prisoner of Azkaban | August 6, 2011 |
Produced by Warner Bros.
| 1529 | 9 | Harry Potter and the Order of the Phoenix | August 13, 2011 |
Produced by Warner Bros.
| 1530 | 10 | Phineas and Ferb the Movie: Across the 2nd Dimension | August 20, 2011 |
| 1531 | 11 | Charlie and the Chocolate Factory | December 11, 2011 |
Produced by Warner Bros. and Village Roadshow Pictures.
| 1532 | 12 | The Santa Clause 3: The Escape Clause | December 18, 2011 |
| 1533 | 13 | The Sound of Music | December 24, 2011 |
Produced by 20th Century Fox (later owned by Disney and rebranded as 20th Century Studios) and Argyle Enterprises
| 1534 | 14 | How the Grinch Stole Christmas | December 25, 2011 |
Produced by Universal Pictures and Imagine Entertainment
| 1535 | 15 | The Chronicles of Narnia: The Lion, the Witch and the Wardrobe | December 30, 2011 |

=== Season 58 (2012) ===
| No. overall | No. in season | Title | Original release date |
|---|---|---|---|
| 1536 | 1 | Over the Hedge | January 21, 2012 |
Produced by Paramount Pictures and DreamWorks Animation
| 1537 | 2 | Pirates of the Caribbean: At World's End | May 12, 2012 |
| 1538 | 3 | Cars | June 16, 2012 |
Animated film produced by Pixar; The first Wonderful World of Disney episode since 2008.
| 1539 | 4 | The Game Plan | August 11, 2012 |
| 1540 | 5 | The Sound of Music | December 23, 2012 |
Produced by 20th Century Fox (later owned by Disney and rebranded as 20th Century Studios) and Argyle Enterprises
| 1541 | 6 | How the Grinch Stole Christmas | December 25, 2012 |
Produced by Universal Pictures and Imagine Entertainment
| 1542 | 7 | Harry Potter and the Goblet of Fire | December 29, 2012 |
Produced by Warner Bros.
| 1543 | 8 | Harry Potter and the Order of the Phoenix | December 30, 2012 |
Produced by Warner Bros.

=== Season 59 (2013) ===
| No. overall | No. in season | Title | Original release date |
|---|---|---|---|
| 1544 | 1 | Harry Potter and the Chamber of Secrets | February 16, 2013 |
Produced by Warner Bros.
| 1545 | 2 | Dreamgirls | February 23, 2013 |
Produced by Paramount Pictures and DreamWorks Pictures
| 1546 | 3 | Over the Hedge | April 27, 2013 |
Produced by Paramount Pictures and DreamWorks Animation
| 1547 | 4 | The Game Plan | July 20, 2013 |
| 1548 | 5 | The Sound of Music | December 22, 2013 |
Produced by 20th Century Fox (later owned by Disney and rebranded as 20th Century Studios) and Argyle Enterprises
| 1549 | 6 | How the Grinch Stole Christmas | December 24, 2013 |
Produced by Universal Pictures and Imagine Entertainment
| 1550 | 7 | Harry Potter and the Sorcerer's Stone | December 29, 2013 |
Produced by Warner Bros.

=== Season 60 (2014) ===
| No. overall | No. in season | Title | Original release date |
|---|---|---|---|
| 1551 | 1 | Over the Hedge | January 4, 2014 |
Produced by Paramount Pictures and DreamWorks Animation
| 1552 | 2 | Toy Story 3 | February 9, 2014 |
Animated film produced by Pixar
| 1553 | 3 | Dreamgirls | February 15, 2014 |
Produced by Paramount Pictures and DreamWorks Pictures
| 1554 | 4 | Up | February 16, 2014 |
Animated film produced by Pixar
| 1555 | 5 | Lucky Duck | June 20, 2014 |
Disney Jr. original movie
| 1556 | 6 | Harry Potter and the Chamber of Secrets | August 16, 2014 |
Produced by Warner Bros.
| 1557 | 7 | The Sound of Music: Sing-A-Long | December 21, 2014 |
Produced by 20th Century Fox (later owned by Disney and rebranded as 20th Century Studios) and Argyle Enterprises
| 1558 | 8 | How the Grinch Stole Christmas | December 25, 2014 |
Produced by Universal Pictures and Imagine Entertainment

=== Season 61 (2015) ===
| No. overall | No. in season | Title | Original release date |
|---|---|---|---|
| 1559 | 1 | Harry Potter and the Sorcerer's Stone | February 7, 2015 |
Produced by Warner Bros.
| 1560 | 2 | Harry Potter and the Chamber of Secrets | February 14, 2015 |
Produced by Warner Bros.
| 1561 | 3 | Toy Story 3 | April 25, 2015 |
Animated film produced by Pixar
| 1562 | 4 | Harry Potter and the Chamber of Secrets | July 18, 2015 |
Produced by Warner Bros.
| 1563 | 5 | Cars | August 29, 2015 |
Animated film produced by Pixar
| 1564 | 6 | Toy Story at 20: To Infinity and Beyond | December 10, 2015 |
| 1565 | 7 | Toy Story | December 10, 2015 |
Animated film produced by Pixar; Rebroadcast episode from seasons 42, 46, 47, 48, 49 and 50.
| 1566 | 8 | Mary Poppins | December 12, 2015 |
Hosted by Dick Van Dyke
| 1567 | 9 | The Sound of Music: Sing-A-Long | December 20, 2015 |
Produced by 20th Century Fox (later owned by Disney and rebranded as 20th Century Studios) and Argyle Enterprises

=== Season 62 (2016) ===
| No. overall | No. in season | Title | Original release date |
|---|---|---|---|
| 1568 | 1 | The Wonderful World of Disney: Disneyland 60 | February 21, 2016 |
| 1569 | 2 | Monsters University | April 23, 2016 |
Animated film produced by Pixar
| 1570 | 3 | Toy Story | May 21, 2016 |
Animated film produced by Pixar; Rebroadcast episode from seasons 42, 46, 47, 48, 49, 50, and 61.
| 1571 | 4 | Finding Nemo | May 28, 2016 |
Animated film produced by Pixar; Included a sneak peek of Finding Dory.
| 1572 | 5 | Harry Potter and the Chamber of Secrets | May 29, 2016 |
Produced by Warner Bros.
| 1573 | 6 | War of the Worlds | June 9, 2016 |
Produced by Paramount Pictures, DreamWorks Pictures and Amblin Entertainment

=== Season 63 (2016–2017) ===
| No. overall | No. in season | Title | Original release date |
|---|---|---|---|
| 1574 | 1 | Mary Poppins | December 10, 2016 |
| 1575 | 2 | Frozen | December 11, 2016 |
Animated film produced by Walt Disney Animation Studios
| 1576 | 3 | The Sound of Music | December 18, 2016 |
Produced by 20th Century Fox (later owned by Disney and rebranded as 20th Century Studios) and Argyle Enterprises
| 1577 | 4 | Tangled | February 19, 2017 |
Animated film produced by Walt Disney Animation Studios
| 1578 | 5 | Over the Hedge | March 25, 2017 |
Produced by Paramount Pictures and DreamWorks Animation
| 1579 | 6 | Dreamgirls | April 29, 2017 |
Produced by Paramount Pictures and DreamWorks Pictures
| 1580 | 7 | Monsters University | May 13, 2017 |
Animated film produced by Pixar

=== Season 64 (2017–2018) ===
| No. overall | No. in season | Title | Original release date |
|---|---|---|---|
| 1581 | 1 | Big Hero 6 | August 5, 2017 |
Animated film produced by Walt Disney Animation Studios
| 1582 | 2 | Mary Poppins | December 9, 2017 |
| 1583 | 3 | Frozen | December 10, 2017 |
Animated film produced by Walt Disney Animation Studios
| 1584 | 4 | Olaf's Frozen Adventure | December 14, 2017 |
| 1585 | 5 | The Sound of Music | December 17, 2017 |
Produced by 20th Century Fox (later owned by Disney and rebranded as 20th Century Studios) and Argyle Enterprises
| 1586 | 6 | Beauty and the Beast (1991) | December 24, 2017 |
| 1587 | 7 | Inside Out | February 7, 2018 |
Animated film produced by Pixar
| 1588 | 8 | A Bug's Life | February 16, 2018 |
Animated film produced by Pixar
| 1589 | 9 | Wreck-It Ralph | February 23, 2018 |
Animated film produced by Walt Disney Animation Studios
| 1590 | 10 | Over the Hedge | March 24, 2018 |
Produced by Paramount Pictures and DreamWorks Animation
| 1591 | 11 | Toy Story 3 | May 23, 2018 |
Animated film produced by Pixar

=== Season 65 (2018–2019) ===
| No. overall | No. in season | Title | Original release date |
|---|---|---|---|
| 1592 | 1 | Frozen | September 30, 2018 |
Animated film produced by Walt Disney Animation Studios
| 1593 | 2 | Mickey's 90th Spectacular | November 4, 2018 |
| 1594 | 3 | The Sound of Music | December 16, 2018 |
Produced by 20th Century Fox (later owned by Disney and rebranded as 20th Century Studios) and Argyle Enterprises
| 1595 | 4 | Star Wars: The Force Awakens | February 17, 2019 |
| 1596 | 5 | Toy Story 2 | May 15, 2019 |
Animated film produced by Pixar
| 1597 | 6 | The Lion King | May 28, 2019 |

=== Season 66 (2019) ===
| No. overall | No. in season | Title | Original release date |
|---|---|---|---|
| 1598 | 1 | The Little Mermaid Live! | November 5, 2019 |
Intro by Jodi Benson, Ariel's original voice actress Included a sneak peek at Frozen II.
| 1599 | 2 | The Wonderful World of Disney: Magical Holiday Celebration | November 28, 2019 |
| 1600 | 3 | The Sound of Music | December 15, 2019 |
Produced by 20th Century Fox (later owned by Disney and rebranded as 20th Century Studios) and Argyle Enterprises
| 1601 | 4 | Disney Parks Magical Christmas Day Parade | December 25, 2019 |

== The Wonderful World of Disney (Presented by Disney+) episodes ==
This list of episodes is films and specials from the Disney+ library.

=== Season 67 (2020) ===
| No. overall | No. in season | Title | Original release date |
|---|---|---|---|
| 1602 | 1 | Moana | May 20, 2020 |
Animated film produced by Walt Disney Animation Studios. Network television premiere, intro by Dwayne Johnson, the voice actor for Maui
| 1603 | 2 | Thor: The Dark World | May 27, 2020 |
First Marvel Cinematic Universe film to be featured on the series
| 1604 | 3 | Up | June 3, 2020 |
Animated film produced by Pixar. Rebroadcast episode from season 60.
| 1605 | 4 | Big Hero 6 | June 10, 2020 |
Animated film produced by Walt Disney Animation Studios. Rebroadcast episode from Season 64.
| 1606 | 5 | Toy Story 3 | June 17, 2020 |
Animated film produced by Pixar. Rebroadcast episode from seasons 60, 61, and 64.

=== Season 68 (2020–2021) ===
| No. overall | No. in season | Title | Original release date |
|---|---|---|---|
| 1607 | 1 | Guardians of the Galaxy | September 23, 2020 |
Network television premiere.
| 1608 | 2 | Coco | October 14, 2020 |
Animated film produced by Pixar. Network television premiere.
| 1609 | 3 | The Lion King | January 5, 2021 |
World television premiere.
| 1610 | 4 | Captain America: The Winter Soldier | January 12, 2021 |
Network television premiere.
| 1611 | 5 | Cinderella | January 19, 2021 |
Network television premiere.
| 1612 | 6 | Incredibles 2 | May 3, 2021 |
Animated film produced by Pixar. Network television premiere.
| 1613 | 7 | Finding Dory | May 10, 2021 |
Animated film produced by Pixar. Network television premiere.
| 1614 | 8 | Monsters, Inc. | May 17, 2021 |
Animated film produced by Pixar. Rebroadcast episode from seasons 50, 51, 53, and 54.
| 1615 | 9 | Tangled | May 24, 2021 |
Animated film produced by Walt Disney Animation Studios. Rebroadcast episode from season 63.
| 1616 | 10 | The Princess and the Frog | May 31, 2021 |
Animated film produced by Walt Disney Animation Studios. Network television premiere.

=== Season 69 (2021–2022) ===
| No. overall | No. in season | Title | Original release date |
|---|---|---|---|
| 1617 | 1 | Toy Story of Terror! | October 28, 2021 |
Animated TV special produced by Pixar. Rebroadcast special.
| 1618 | 2 | Toy Story 4 | October 28, 2021 |
Animated film produced by Pixar. Network television premiere.
| 1619 | 3 | The Wonderful World of Disney: Magical Holiday Celebration | November 28, 2021 |
Rebroadcast special
| 1620 | 4 | Olaf's Frozen Adventure | December 8, 2021 |
Rebroadcast special
| 1621 | 5 | Toy Story That Time Forgot | December 8, 2021 |
Animated TV special produced by Pixar. Rebroadcast special
| 1622 | 6 | The Sound of Music | December 19, 2021 |
Produced by 20th Century Studios and Argyle Enterprises. Rebroadcast episode from seasons 49, 50, 51, 52, 54, 55, 56, 57, 58, 59, 60, 63, 64, 65, and 66.
| 1623 | 7 | Olaf's Frozen Adventure | December 24, 2021 |
Rebroadcast special
| 1624 | 8 | Prep & Landing | December 24, 2021 |
Animated TV special produced by Walt Disney Animation Studios. Rebroadcast special
| 1625 | 9 | Prep & Landing: Naughty vs. Nice | December 24, 2021 |
Animated TV special produced by Walt Disney Animation Studios. Rebroadcast special
| 1626 | 10 | Disney Parks Magical Christmas Day Parade | December 25, 2021 |
| 1627 | 11 | Frozen | December 30, 2021 |
Animated film produced by Walt Disney Animation Studios. Rebroadcast episode from seasons 63, 64, and 65
| 1628 | 12 | The Lion King | April 23, 2022 |
Rebroadcast episode from Season 68
| 1629 | 13 | Beauty and the Beast | April 30, 2022 |
Rebroadcast episode from Season 47
| 1630 | 14 | Moana | May 9, 2022 |
Animated film produced by Walt Disney Animation Studios. Rebroadcast episode from season 67
| 1631 | 15 | Finding Dory | May 14, 2022 |
Animated film produced by Pixar. Rebroadcast episode from Season 68
| 1632 | 16 | Up | May 16, 2022 |
Animated film produced by Pixar. Rebroadcast episode from Season 67
| 1633 | 17 | Zootopia | May 30, 2022 |
Animated film produced by Walt Disney Animation Studios. Network television premiere.
| 1634 | 18 | Brave | June 6, 2022 |
Animated film produced by Pixar. Network television premiere.

=== Season 70 (2022–2023) ===
| No. overall | No. in season | Title | Original release date |
|---|---|---|---|
| 1635 | 1 | Rodgers & Hammerstein's Cinderella | August 23, 2022 |
Rebroadcast episode from Season 42
| 1636 | 2 | Hocus Pocus | September 29, 2022 |
Rebroadcast episode from Season 40, first broadcast airing in twenty-seven years. Included a sneak peek at Hocus Pocus 2.
| 1637 | 3 | Enchanted | November 17, 2022 |
First broadcast airing in ten years. Included a sneak peek at Disenchanted.
| 1638 | 4 | Mickey Saves Christmas | November 27, 2022 |
Broadcast Television Premiere
| 1639 | 5 | Olaf's Frozen Adventure | November 27, 2022 |
Rebroadcast episode from Season 64 and 69
| 1640 | 6 | The Wonderful World of Disney: Magical Holiday Celebration | November 27, 2022 |
| 1641 | 7 | Frozen 2 | December 1, 2022 |
Animated film produced by Walt Disney Animation Studios. World television premiere
| 1642 | 8 | Avatar | December 11, 2022 |
Produced by 20th Century Studios. Network television premiere
| 1643 | 9 | The Sound of Music | December 18, 2022 |
Produced by 20th Century Studios and Argyle Enterprises. Rebroadcast episode from seasons 49, 50, 51, 52, 54, 55, 56, 57, 58, 59, 60, 63, 64, 65, 66, and 69.
| 1644 | 10 | Home Alone | December 24, 2022 |
Produced by 20th Century Studios and Hughes Entertainment. Network television premiere
| 1645 | 11 | Disney Parks Magical Christmas Day Parade | December 25, 2022 |
| 1646 | 12 | The Lion King | January 8, 2023 |
2019 Remake of the 1994 film. Originally supposed to air January 1, 2023 but was postponed in the wake of the passing of Barbara Walters.
| 1647 | 13 | Finding Nemo | January 15, 2023 |
Animated film produced by Pixar. Rebroadcast episode from Season 51, 52, 53, 54, 56, and 62
| 1648 | 14 | Iron Man | January 22, 2023 |
Produced by Paramount Pictures and Marvel Studios. Network television premiere.
| 1649 | 15 | The Avengers | January 29, 2023 |
Broadcast television Premiere

=== Season 71 (2023–2024) ===
| No. overall | No. in season | Title | Original release date |
|---|---|---|---|
| 1650 | 1 | Shang-Chi and the Legend of the Ten Rings | May 25, 2023 |
World television premiere.
| 1651 | 2 | Up | June 18, 2023 |
Animated film produced by Pixar. Rebroadcast episode from Season 67 and 69.
| 1652 | 3 | Cinderella | June 25, 2023 |
Rebroadcast episode from Season 68.
| 1653 | 4 | Toy Story 2 | July 2, 2023 |
Animated film produced by Pixar. Rebroadcast episode from seasons 46, 47, 52, 65 and 53.
| 1654 | 5 | Ms. Marvel | August 5, 2023 (1–3) |
First Marvel Cinematic Universe television series to be featured on the series
| 1655 | 6 | Ms. Marvel | August 12, 2023 (4–6) |
First Marvel Cinematic Universe television series to be featured on the series
| 1656 | 7 | Jungle Cruise | October 1, 2023 |
World television premiere.
| 1657 | 8 | Cruella | October 8, 2023 |
Network television premiere.
| 1658 | 9 | The Wonderful World of Disney: Disney's 100th Anniversary Celebration | October 15, 2023 |
Kelly Ripa introduces the short film Once Upon a Studio (replayed at the end of the episode) and the world television premiere of Encanto, as well as a sneak peek of Wish.
| 1659 | 10 | The Nightmare Before Christmas | October 22, 2023 |
Network television premiere
| 1660 | 11 | Hocus Pocus | October 29, 2023 |
Rebroadcast episode from seasons 40 and 57.
| 1661 | 12 | Coco | November 5, 2023 |
Animated film produced by Pixar. Rebroadcast episode from Season 68.
| 1662 | 13 | The Empire Strikes Back | November 12, 2023 |
Produced by 20th Century Studios and Lucasfilm Ltd.
| 1663 | 14 | Raya and the Last Dragon | November 19, 2023 |
Animated film produced by Walt Disney Animation Studios. World television premiere.
| 1664 | 15 | The Wonderful World of Disney: Magical Holiday Celebration | November 26, 2023 |
| 1665 | 16 | The Santa Clause | December 3, 2023 |
Rebroadcast episode from Season 42, 43, 44, 45, 46, 47 and 50.
| 1666 | 17 | Mickey Saves Christmas | December 10, 2023 |
Rebroadcast episode from Season 57.
| 1667 | 18 | Olaf's Frozen Adventure | December 10, 2023 |
Rebroadcast episode from seasons 64, 69 and 70.
| 1668 | 19 | Frozen | December 10, 2023 |
Animated film produced by Walt Disney Animation Studios. Rebroadcast episode from seasons 63, 64, 65 and 69.
| 1669 | 20 | The Sound of Music | December 17, 2023 |
Produced by 20th Century Studios and Argyle Enterprises. Rebroadcast episode from seasons 49, 50, 51, 52, 54, 55, 56, 57, 58, 59, 60, 63, 64, 65, 66, 69 and 70.
| 1670 | 21 | Prep & Landing | December 19, 2023 |
Animated TV special produced by Walt Disney Animation Studios. Rebroadcast episode from Season 56.
| 1671 | 22 | Prep & Landing: Naughty vs. Nice | December 19, 2023 |
Animated TV special produced by Walt Disney Animation Studios. Rebroadcast episode from Season 56.
| 1672 | 23 | Home Alone | December 24, 2023 |
Produced by 20th Century Studios and Hughes Entertainment. Rebroadcast episode from Season 70.
| 1673 | 24 | Disney Parks Magical Christmas Day Parade | December 25, 2023 |
| 1674 | 25 | Solo: A Star Wars Story | January 7, 2024 |
Network television premiere.
| 1675 | 26 | The Lion King | January 14, 2024 |
Rebroadcast episode from Season 41 and 42.
| 1676 | 27 | Soul | January 21, 2024 |
Animated film produced by Pixar. World television premiere.
| 1677 | 28 | The Parent Trap | January 28, 2024 |
Rebroadcast episode from Season 46.

=== Season 72 (2024–2025) ===
| No. overall | No. in season | Title | Original release date |
|---|---|---|---|
| 1678 | 1 | Inside Out | June 2, 2024 |
Animated film produced by Pixar. Rebroadcast episode from Season 64. Included a sneak peek of Inside Out 2.
| 1679 | 2 | The Jungle Book | June 16, 2024 |
Network television premiere.
| 1680 | 3 | Up | June 23, 2024 |
Animated film produced by Pixar. Rebroadcast episode from Season 67, 69 and 71.
| 1681 | 4 | The Princess and the Frog | June 30, 2024 |
Animated film produced by Walt Disney Animation Studios. Rebroadcast episode from Season 68.
| 1682 | 5 | Homeward Bound: The Incredible Journey | July 7, 2024 |
Rebroadcast episode from Season 39.
| 1683 | 6 | The Sandlot | July 21, 2024 |
Produced by 20th Century Studios and Island World. Rebroadcast episode from season 41. Postponed a week from its original airdate due to the attempted assassination of Donald Trump.
| 1684 | 7 | The Mighty Ducks | July 28, 2024 |
Rebroadcast episode from Season 39.
| 1685 | 8 | Honey, I Shrunk The Kids | August 4, 2024 |
Rebroadcast episode from Season 36.
| 1686 | 9 | Jungle Cruise | August 18, 2024 |
Rebroadcast episode from Season 71.
| 1687 | 10 | The Princess Diaries | August 25, 2024 |
Rebroadcast episode from Season 49, 51, 52 and 53.
| 1688 | 11 | The Little Mermaid | October 6, 2024 |
World television premiere.
| 1689 | 12 | Haunted Mansion | October 13, 2024 |
Network television premiere.
| 1690 | 13 | Hocus Pocus | October 20, 2024 |
Rebroadcast episode from Season 40, 70 and 71.
| 1691 | 14 | Hocus Pocus 2 | October 27, 2024 |
Network television premiere.
| 1692 | 15 | Coco | November 3, 2024 |
Animated film produced by Pixar. Rebroadcast episode from Season 68 and 71.
| 1693 | 16 | Mrs. Doubtfire | November 10, 2024 |
Produced by 20th Century Studios and Blue Wolf Productions. Network television premiere.
| 1694 | 17 | Indiana Jones and the Dial of Destiny | November 17, 2024 |
Network television premiere.
| 1695 | 18 | Moana | November 24, 2024 |
Animated film produced by Walt Disney Animation Studios. Rebroadcast episode from seasons 67 and 69. Included a sneak peek at Moana 2.
| 1696 | 19 | Mary Poppins | November 28, 2024 |
Rebroadcast episode from Season 31, 47, 62, 63 and 64.
| 1697 | 20 | The Wonderful World of Disney: Holiday Spectacular | December 1, 2024 |
| 1698 | 21 | The Lion King | December 8, 2024 |
Rebroadcast episode from seasons 68, 69, and 70. Included a sneak peek at Mufasa: The Lion King.
| 1699 | 22 | Olaf's Frozen Adventure | December 10, 2024 |
Rebroadcast special.
| 1700 | 23 | Toy Story That Time Forgot | December 10, 2024 |
Animated TV special produced by Pixar. Rebroadcast special.
| 1701 | 24 | Prep & Landing | December 10, 2024 |
Animated TV special produced by Walt Disney Animation Studios. Rebroadcast special.
| 1702 | 25 | Prep & Landing: Naughty vs. Nice | December 10, 2024 |
Animated TV special produced by Walt Disney Animation Studios. Rebroadcast special.
| 1703 | 26 | The Sound of Music | December 15, 2024 |
Produced by 20th Century Studios and Argyle Enterprises. Rebroadcast episode from seasons 49, 50, 51, 52, 54, 55, 56, 57, 58, 59, 60, 63, 64, 65, 66, 69, 70 and 71.
| 1704 | 27 | The Santa Clause | December 22, 2024 |
Presented by Tim Allen and Kat Dennings. Rebroadcast episode from Season 42, 43, 44, 45, 46, 47, 50, and 71.
| 1705 | 28 | Home Alone | December 24, 2024 |
Produced by 20th Century Studios and Hughes Entertainment. Rebroadcast episode from Season 70 and 71.
| 1706 | 29 | Disney Parks Magical Christmas Day Parade | December 25, 2024 |
| 1707 | 30 | Frozen | December 29, 2024 |
Animated film produced by Walt Disney Animation Studios. Rebroadcast episode from Season 63, 64, 65, 69, and 71. Included a sneak peek at Snow White. Original schedule included Frozen II airing after the first film, but was pulled due to the death of Jimmy Carter.
| 1708 | 31 | Toy Story 3 | January 5, 2025 |
Animated film produced by Pixar. Rebroadcast episode from seasons 60, 61, 64 and 67.
| 1709 | 32 | Marley & Me | January 12, 2025 |
Produced by 20th Century Studios. Network television premiere.
| 1710 | 33 | Beauty and the Beast | January 19, 2025 |
Network television premiere.
| 1711 | 34 | The Proposal | January 26, 2025 |
Produced by Touchstone Pictures. Network television premiere.
| 1712 | 35 | Thor: Love and Thunder | February 23, 2025 |
Network television premiere.

=== Season 73 (2025–2026) ===
| No. overall | No. in season | Title | Original release date |
|---|---|---|---|
| 1713 | 1 | Inside Out | June 1, 2025 |
Animated film produced by Pixar. Rebroadcast episode from seasons 64 and 72. Included a sneak peek of Elio.
| 1714 | 2 | Homeward Bound: The Incredible Journey | June 29, 2025 |
Rebroadcast episode from seasons 39 and 72.
| 1715 | 3 | Independence Day | July 3, 2025 |
Produced by 20th Century Studios and Centropolis Entertainment. Network television premiere, joint broadcast with Disney-owned FX.
| 1716 | 4 | The Princess Bride | July 6, 2025 |
Produced by 20th Century Studios, Act III Communications and Buttercup Films. Network television premiere.
| 1717 | 5 | The Sandlot | July 13, 2025 |
Produced by 20th Century Studios and Island World. Rebroadcast episode from seasons 41 and 72.
| 1718 | 6 | Big | July 20, 2025 |
Produced by 20th Century Studios and Gracie Films. Network television premiere.
| 1719 | 7 | Father of the Bride | July 27, 2025 |
Produced by Touchstone Pictures. Rebroadcast episode from season 43.
| 1720 | 8 | Freaky Friday | August 3, 2025 |
Rebroadcast episode from seasons 52, 53 and 54. Included a sneak peek of Freakier Friday.
| 1721 | 9 | The Parent Trap | August 10, 2025 |
Rebroadcast episode from seasons 46 and 71.
| 1722 | 10 | Sister Act | August 17, 2025 |
Presented by Whoopi Goldberg. Produced by Touchstone Pictures. Network television premiere.
| 1723 | 11 | The Princess Diaries | August 24, 2025 |
Rebroadcast episode from seasons 49, 51, 52, 53 and 72.
| 1724 | 12 | Indiana Jones and the Dial of Destiny | September 7, 2025 |
Rebroadcast episode from season 72.
| 1725 | 13 | Jungle Cruise | September 14, 2025 |
Rebroadcast episode from seasons 71 and 72.
| 1726 | 14 | Guardians of the Galaxy Vol. 3 | September 28, 2025 |
Network television premiere.
| 1727 | 15 | Black Panther: Wakanda Forever | October 5, 2025 |
Network television premiere.
| 1728 | 16 | Haunted Mansion | October 12, 2025 |
Rebroadcast episode from season 72.
| 1729 | 17 | Edward Scissorhands | October 19, 2025 |
Produced by 20th Century Studios. Network television premiere.
| 1730 | 18 | Hocus Pocus | October 26, 2025 |
Rebroadcast episode from seasons 40, 70, 71 and 72.
| 1731 | 19 | The Greatest Showman | November 2, 2025 |
Produced by 20th Century Studios, Chermin Entertainment and Laurence Mark Productions. Network television premiere.
| 1732 | 20 | The Devil Wears Prada | November 9, 2025 |
Produced by 20th Century Studios. Network television premiere.
| 1733 | 21 | Sweet Home Alabama | November 16, 2025 |
Produced by Touchstone Pictures. Rebroadcast episode from season 51.
| 1734 | 22 | Zootopia | November 23, 2025 |
Animated film produced by Walt Disney Animation Studios. Rebroadcast episode from season 69. Included a sneak peek of Zootopia 2.
| 1735 | 23 | Mary Poppins | November 27, 2025 |
Rebroadcast episode from season 31, 47, 62, 63, 64 and 72.
| 1736 | 24 | Prep & Landing | November 30, 2025 |
Animated TV special produced by Walt Disney Animation Studios. Rebroadcast episode from seasons 56, 71 and 72.
| 1737 | 25 | Prep & Landing: Naughty vs. Nice | November 30, 2025 |
Animated TV special produced by Walt Disney Animation Studios. Rebroadcast episode from seasons 56, 71 and 72.
| 1738 | 26 | Prep & Landing: The Snowball Protocol | November 30, 2025 |
Network television premiere.
| 1739 | 27 | Olaf's Frozen Adventure | November 30, 2025 |
Rebroadcast episode from seasons 64, 69, 70, 71 and 72.
| 1740 | 28 | Santa Claus Is Comin' to Town | November 30, 2025 |
Network television special.
| 1741 | 29 | The Wonderful World of Disney: Holiday Spectacular | December 1, 2025 |
| 1742 | 30 | The Santa Clause | December 7, 2025 |
Rebroadcast episode from seasons 42, 43, 44, 45, 46, 47, 50, 71 and 72.
| 1743 | 31 | Avatar: The Way of Water | December 14, 2025 |
Produced by 20th Century Studios and Lightstorm Entertainment. Network television premiere.
| 1744 | 32 | The Sound of Music | December 21, 2025 |
Produced by 20th Century Studios and Argyle Enterprises. Rebroadcast episode from seasons 49, 50, 51, 52, 54, 55, 56, 57, 58, 59, 60, 63, 64, 65, 66, 69, 70, 71 and 72.
| 1745 | 33 | Home Alone | December 24, 2025 |
Produced by 20th Century Studios and Hughes Entertainment. Rebroadcast episode from seasons 70, 71 and 72.
| 1746 | 34 | Disney Parks Magical Christmas Day Parade | December 25, 2025 |
| 1747 | 35 | Elemental | December 28, 2025 |
Animated film produced by Pixar. Network television premiere.
| 1748 | 36 | That Thing You Do! | January 11, 2026 |
Produced by 20th Century Studios. Network television premiere.
| 1749 | 37 | Mrs. Doubtfire | January 18, 2026 |
Produced by 20th Century Studios and Blue Wolf Productions. Rebroadcast episode from season 72.

=== Season 74 (2026–2027) ===
| No. overall | No. in season | Title | Original release date |
|---|---|---|---|
| 1750 | 1 | The Devil Wears Prada | May 3, 2026 |
Produced by 20th Century Studios. Rebroadcast episode from season 73.
| 1751 | 2 | Star Wars: The Force Awakens | May 24, 2026 |
Produced by Lucasfilm Ltd. Rebroadcast episode from season 65.
| 1752 | 3 | Who Framed Roger Rabbit | May 31, 2026 |
Produced by Touchstone Pictures, Amblin Entertainment and Silver Screen Partners III. Rebroadcast episode from seasons 36, 37 and 39.
| 1753 | 4 | Toy Story 4 | June 7, 2026 |
Rebroadcast episode from season 69. Included a sneak peek of Toy Story 5.
| 1754 | 5 | Sister Act | June 21, 2026 |
Produced by Touchstone Pictures. Rebroadcast episode from season 73.
| 1755 | 6 | Armageddon | June 28, 2026 |
Produced by Touchstone Pictures, Jerry Bruckheimer Films and Valhalla Motion Pictures. Rebroadcast episode from season 46.
| 1756 | 7 | Independence Day | July 2, 2026 |
Produced by 20th Century Studios and Centropolis Entertainment. Rebroadcast episode from season 73, joint broadcast with Disney-owned FX.
| 1757 | 8 | The Sandlot | July 5, 2026 |
Produced by 20th Century Studios and Island World. Rebroadcast episode from seasons 41, 72 and 73.
| 1758 | 9 | Moana | July 6, 2026 |
Animated film produced by Walt Disney Animation Studios. Rebroadcast episode from seasons 67, 69 and 72. Included a sneak peek at Moana.
| 1759 | 10 | What About Bob? | July 12, 2026 |
Produced by Touchstone Pictures. Rebroadcast episode from seasons 39 and 40.
| 1760 | 11 | Speed | July 19, 2026 |
Produced by 20th Century Studios and Mark Gordon Company. Network television premiere.
| 1761 | 12 | True Lies | July 26, 2026 |
Produced by 20th Century Studios and Lightstorm Entertainment. Network television premiere.
| 1762 | 13 | Cocktail | August 2, 2026 |
Produced by Touchstone Pictures, Silver Screen Partners III and Interscope Communications. Network television premiere.
| 1763 | 14 | While You Were Sleeping | August 9, 2026 |
Produced by Hollywood Pictures and Caravan Pictures. Network television premiere.
| 1764 | 15 | Disney Princess: The Ultimate Concert Celebration | August 16, 2026 |
| 1765 | 16 | The Princess Diaries | August 16, 2026 |
Rebroadcast episode from seasons 49, 51, 52, 53, 72 and 73.
| 1767 | 18 | Father of the Bride Part II | August 23, 2026 |
Produced by Touchstone Pictures. Rebroadcast episode from season 44.
| 1768 | 19 | 9 to 5 | August 30, 2026 |
Produced by 20th Century Studios and IPC Films. Network television premiere. Original schedule included Sister Act 2: Back in the Habit airing in its timeslot, but was changed due to the death of Dolly Parton.
| 1769 | 20 | The Parent Trap | September 13, 2026 |
Rebroadcast episode from seasons 46, 71 and 73.
| 1770 | 21 | Inside Out 2 | September 27, 2026 |
Animated film produced by Pixar. Network television premiere.
| 1771 | 22 | Cruella | October 4, 2026 |
Rebroadcast episode from season 71.
| 1772 | 23 | The Sixth Sense | October 11, 2026 |
Produced by Hollywood Pictures, Spyglass Entertainment, The Kennedy/Marshall Company, and Barry Mendel Productions. Rebroadcast episode from seasons 46, 50 and 51.
| 1773 | 24 | Hocus Pocus | October 18, 2026 |
Rebroadcast episode from seasons 40, 70, 71, 72 and 73.
| 1774 | 25 | Ghostbusters | October 25, 2026 |
Produced by Columbia-Delphi Productions and Black Rhino. Network television premiere.
| 1775 | 26 | Mrs. Doubtfire | November 1, 2026 |
Produced by 20th Century Studios and Blue Wolf Productions. Rebroadcast episode from seasons 72 and 73.
| 1776 | 27 | Beauty and the Beast | November 8, 2026 |
Rebroadcast episode from seasons 47 and 69.
| 1777 | 28 | Sister Act 2: Back in the Habit | November 15, 2026 |
Produced by Touchstone Pictures. Rebroadcast episode from season 44.
| 1778 | 29 | Frozen 2 | November 22, 2026 |
Rebroadcast episode from season 70. Included a sneak peek at Hexed.
| 1779 | 30 | Mickey's Christmas Carol | November 25, 2026 |
Rebroadcast episode from seasons 31, 32, 33, 34, 35, 36, 38, 39, 40, 42 and 45.
| 1780 | 31 | Mary Poppins | November 26, 2026 |
Rebroadcast episode from season 31, 47, 62, 63, 64, 72 and 73.
| 1781 | 32 | The Sound of Music | November 29, 2026 |
Produced by 20th Century Studios and Argyle Enterprises. Rebroadcast episode from seasons 49, 50, 51, 52, 54, 55, 56, 57, 58, 59, 60, 63, 64, 65, 66, 69, 70, 71, 72 and 73.
| 1782 | 33 | Die Hard | December 6, 2026 |
Produced by 20th Century Studios, Gordon Company and Silver Pictures. Network television premiere.
| 1783 | 34 | The Fantastic Four: First Steps | December 13, 2026 |
Network television premiere.
| 1784 | 35 | Father of the Bride | December 20, 2026 |
Produced by Touchstone Pictures. Rebroadcast episode from seasons 43 and 73.
| 1785 | 36 | The Santa Clause | December 23, 2026 |
Rebroadcast episode from Season 42, 43, 44, 45, 46, 47, 50, 71, 72 and 73.
| 1786 | 37 | Home Alone | December 24, 2026 |
Produced by 20th Century Studios and Hughes Entertainment. Rebroadcast episode from seasons 70, 71, 72 and 73.
| 1787 | 38 | Mufasa: The Lion King | December 27, 2026 |
Network television premiere.
