= Good Grief, Charlie Brown: A Tribute to Charles Schulz =

- Genre: documentary television special
- Voices of: Christopher Johnson; Bill Melendez
- Country of origin: United States
- Original language: English

Production
- Running time: 22 minutes

Original release
- Network: CBS
- Release: February 11, 2000

Related
- You Don't Look 40, Charlie Brown (1990); Here's to You, Charlie Brown: 50 Great Years (2000); It's the Pied Piper, Charlie Brown (2000)

Good Grief, Charlie Brown: A Tribute to Charles Schulz is a documentary television special that features a tribute to Charles M. Schulz and his creation Peanuts.

The television special, the first of the 2000s, was originally aired on the CBS Television Network on February 11, 2000, one day before Schulz died.

== Cast ==
- Scott Adams - Himself
- Eugene Cernan - Himself
- Walter Cronkite - Host/Himself
- Jim Davis - Himself
- Matt Groening - Himself
- Charles M. Schulz - Himself
- Cathy Guisewite - Herself
- Jean Schulz - Herself
- Donna Wold - Herself
- Christopher Johnson - Charlie Brown (voice)
- Bill Melendez - Snoopy (voice)
