= Here's to You, Charlie Brown: 50 Great Years =

2000 documentary television special

- Genre: documentary television special
- Voices of: Christopher Ryan Johnson; Corey Padnos; Rachel Davey; Bill Melendez
- Country of origin: United States
- Original language: English

Production
- Running time: 60 mins
- Production company: Lee Mendelson/Bill Melendez Productions

Original release
- Network: CBS
- Release: May 10, 2000

Related
- Good Grief, Charlie Brown: A Tribute to Charles Schulz (2000); It's the Pied Piper, Charlie Brown (2000)

Here's to You, Charlie Brown: 50 Great Years is a documentary television special featuring a tribute to Charles M. Schulz and his creation Peanuts. This was the final Peanuts project that Charles M. Schulz ever worked on before his death, and it was originally aired on the CBS Television Network in 2000 making it the last Peanuts special to air on CBS.

== Cast ==
- Faith Hill – Herself
- B.B. King – Himself
- Walter Cronkite – Himself
- Joe Montana – Himself
- Willie Mays – Himself
- Whoopi Goldberg – Host (later replaced by Snoopy as star guest)
- Joe Cipriano – Announcer (later mayor)
- Christopher Johnson – Charlie Brown (voice)
- Charles M. Schulz – Himself
- Joe Torre – Himself
- Corey Padnos – Linus van Pelt (voice)
- Rachel Davey – Lucy van Pelt and Peppermint Patty (voice)
- Bill Melendez – Snoopy and Woodstock (voice)
