= It's the Pied Piper, Charlie Brown =

2000 animated home video

- Genre: Animated television special
- Created by: Charles M. Schulz
- Based on: Pied Piper of Hamelin
- Written by: Charles M. Schulz
- Directed by: Bill Melendez
- Theme music composer: David Benoit
- Country of origin: United States
- Original language: English

Production
- Producers: Lee Mendelson; Bill Melendez; Mike Wallis
- Running time: 25 minutes
- Production companies: United Media; Lee Mendelson Film Productions; Melendez Films

Original release
- Release: September 12, 2000

Related
- Here's to You, Charlie Brown: 50 Great Years (2000); A Charlie Brown Valentine (2002)

It's the Pied Piper, Charlie Brown is the 39th and last animated special produced under the supervision of Charles M. Schulz. Based on characters from the comic strip Peanuts, it was originally released exclusively in VHS and DVD formats on September 12, 2000, seven months after Schulz's death.

== Plot ==
Charlie Brown recounts the story of the Pied Piper of Hamelin to his sister Sally. She dismisses an alternate option, War and Peace, due to its heavier weight.

In this retelling, the town suffers from a mouse infestation, as Sally insists on substituting mice for rats, which she dislikes. The mice, engaging in activities such as sports and dancing, disrupt the lives of the townspeople. To address the issue, the mayor contracts the "Pied Piper Beagle," portrayed by Snoopy, promising him a year's supply of dog food as compensation. Snoopy, using his concertina, successfully leads the mice out of the town.

When the mayor reneges on the payment despite a signed contract, Snoopy retaliates by luring the mayor and his officials away with his music.

Charlie Brown concludes the tale. Sally expresses skepticism about the story's plausibility in real life. Outside, Snoopy begins playing music from his doghouse. Linus, Lucy, Franklin, and Peppermint Patty join in, dancing to the rhythm. Lucy, frustrated, orders Charlie Brown to intervene and stop Snoopy.

== Cast ==
- Quinn Beswick - Charlie Brown
- Ashley Edner - Sally Brown
- Corey Padnos - Linus van Pelt
- Rachel Davey - Lucy van Pelt
- Frank Welker - The Mayor (speaking voice)
  - Randy Crenshaw - The Mayor (singing voice)
- Neil Ross - Interviewer/Townsperson/The Mayor's Council (speaking voices)
  - Randy Crenshaw, Michael Mishaw, Gene Morford, and Don Shelton - The Mayor's Council (singing voices)
- Pat Musick - First Woman
- Joan Van Ark - Secretary
- Bill Melendez - Snoopy/Woodstock/Mice Sounds

Violet, Peppermint Patty, Schroeder, Pig-Pen, Marcie, and Franklin also appear but have no lines.
