= Al Pabian =

American animator

Albert Frank Pabian (1918–2015) was an American animator from Chuck Jones Enterprises and Mendelson-Melendez Productions. He animated for the Peanuts cartoon specials and films. He animated three Peanuts films in the 1970s and the 1980s and also animated thirty-five Peanuts specials in the 1970, the 1980s, the 1990s and the 2000s.

== Films ==
- Jerry, Jerry, Quite Contrary (1966), (short) - animator
- Snoopy Come Home (1972) - graphic blandishment
- Race for Your Life, Charlie Brown (1977) - animator
- Bon Voyage, Charlie Brown (and Don't Come Back!!) (1980) - animator

== Television specials ==
- Play It Again, Charlie Brown (1971) - graphic blandishment
- You're Not Elected, Charlie Brown (1972) - graphic blandishment
- There's No Time for Love, Charlie Brown (1973) - graphic blandishment
- A Charlie Brown Thanksgiving (1973) - graphic blandishment
- It's a Mystery, Charlie Brown (1974) - graphic blandishment
- It's the Easter Beagle, Charlie Brown (1974) - animator
- Yes, Virginia, There Is a Santa Claus (1974) - animator
- Be My Valentine, Charlie Brown (1975) - animator
- You're a Good Sport, Charlie Brown (1975) - assistant animator
- It's Arbor Day, Charlie Brown (1976) - assistant animator
- It's Your First Kiss, Charlie Brown (1977) - animator
- What a Nightmare, Charlie Brown! (1978) - assistant animator
- Raggedy Ann and Andy in The Great Santa Claus Caper (1978) - assistant animator
- You're the Greatest, Charlie Brown (1979) - animator
- She's a Good Skate, Charlie Brown (1980) - assistant animator
- Life Is a Circus, Charlie Brown (1980) - assistant animator
- It's Magic, Charlie Brown (1981) - assistant animator
- No Man's Valley (1981) - animator
- Someday You'll Find Her, Charlie Brown (1981) - assistant animator
- A Charlie Brown Celebration (1981) - animator
- Here Comes Garfield (1982) - animator
- Is This Goodbye, Charlie Brown? (1983) - animator
- It's an Adventure, Charlie Brown (1983) - animator
- What Have We Learned, Charlie Brown? (1983) - animator
- Garfield on the Town (1983) - animator
- It's Flashbeagle, Charlie Brown (1984) - director
- Garfield in the Rough (1984) - key assistant animator
- The Romance of Betty Boop (1985) - animator
- Snoopy's Getting Married, Charlie Brown (1985) - animator
- Garfield's Halloween Adventure (1985) - assistant animator
- You're a Good Man, Charlie Brown (1985) - animator
- Happy New Year, Charlie Brown! (1985) - animator
- Garfield in Paradise (1986) - assistant animator
- Cathy (1987) - animator
- Snoopy: The Musical (1988) - animator
- Cathy's Last Resort (1988) - animator
- It's the Girl in the Red Truck, Charlie Brown (1988) - graphic blandishment
- Cathy's Valentine (1989) - animator
- Why, Charlie Brown, Why? (1990) - animator
- Snoopy's Reunion (1991) - animator
- It's Spring Training, Charlie Brown (1992) - animator
- Frosty Returns (1992) - animator
- It Was My Best Birthday Ever, Charlie Brown (1997) - graphic blandishment
- A Charlie Brown Valentine (2002) - clean-up artist
- Charlie Brown's Christmas Tales (2002) - clean-up artist
- I Want a Dog for Christmas, Charlie Brown (2003) - clean-up artist

== Television series ==
- The Charlie Brown and Snoopy Show (1983–1985) - animator (9 episodes)
- This Is America, Charlie Brown (1990–1989) - animator (7 episodes)
- Garfield and Friends (1988–1994) - animator (1 episode - 1994)

== Video games ==
- Get Ready for School, Charlie Brown! (1995) - animator
- Snoopy's Campfire Stories (1996) - animator
