= Judy Munsen =

American composer (born 1949)

- Born: February 23, 1949 (age 77)
- Occupation: composer
- Years active: 1977–1992

Judy Munsen (born February 23, 1949) is a composer for several television programs during the mid-1970s. Munsen succeeded Vince Guaraldi after his death in February 1976, working alongside Ed Bogas, composing music for several Peanuts specials between 1977 and 1992 as well as the film Bon Voyage, Charlie Brown (and Don't Come Back!!). One review of the latter score was negative: "Musically, the score by the duo of Ed Bogas (who worked on Race for Your Life) and Judy Munsen feels incomplete without incorporating any of Vince Guaraldi’s iconic themes." On the other hand, another reviewer called A Charlie Brown Valentine "one of the most tightly plotted Peanuts specials out there, with a strong narrative that ... manages to treat us to a more abstract sequence covered by a song sung by Judy Munsen."

== Works ==
Her works include:

- Race for Your Life, Charlie Brown: Music Supervisor
- It's Your First Kiss, Charlie Brown: Composer
- What a Nightmare, Charlie Brown!: Music Supervisor
- You're the Greatest, Charlie Brown: Composer
- She's a Good Skate, Charlie Brown: Composer
- Bon Voyage, Charlie Brown (and Don't Come Back!!): Composer
- Life Is a Circus, Charlie Brown: Composer
- It's Magic, Charlie Brown: Composer
- Someday You'll Find Her, Charlie Brown: Composer
- A Charlie Brown Celebration: Composer
- Is This Goodbye, Charlie Brown?: Composer
- What Have We Learned, Charlie Brown?: Composer
- Snoopy's Getting Married, Charlie Brown: Composer
- Two Daddies?: Composer
- Why, Charlie Brown, Why?: Composer
- Snoopy's Reunion: Composer
- It's Spring Training, Charlie Brown: Composer
