= A Charlie Brown Celebration =

1982 animated television special

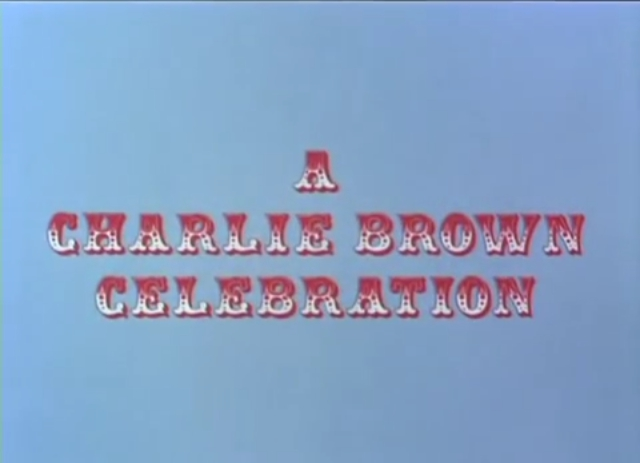
- Genre: Animation; Family
- Based on: Peanuts by Charles M. Schulz
- Written by: Charles M. Schulz
- Directed by: Bill Melendez
- Voices of: Casey Carlson; Shannon Cohn; Christopher Donohoe; Kristen Fullerton; Brent Hauer; Michael Mandy; Earl Reilly; Cindi Reilly; Bill Melendez
- Music by: Ed Bogas; Judy Munsen
- Country of origin: United States
- Original language: English

Production
- Producers: Lee Mendelson; Bill Melendez
- Editors: Chuck McCann; Roger Donley
- Running time: 48 minutes
- Production companies: Bill Melendez Productions; Lee Mendelson Film Productions

Original release
- Network: CBS
- Release: May 24, 1982

Related
- Someday You'll Find Her, Charlie Brown (1981); Is This Goodbye, Charlie Brown? (1983)

A Charlie Brown Celebration is the 23rd prime-time animated television special based upon the comic strip Peanuts, by Charles M. Schulz, who appears in a live-action prologue, and the first hour-long special. It originally aired on the CBS network on May 24, 1982 and consists of a number of stories adapted from the comic strip.

Michael Mandy returned to reprise his role for Charlie Brown for the final time, as Brad Kesten would take over in Is This Goodbye, Charlie Brown?

== Production ==
The formula used in this special, several stories with one or two-word titles, was later adapted for the Saturday morning CBS series, The Charlie Brown and Snoopy Show, which premiered in 1983, and used in another special, It's an Adventure, Charlie Brown. A compilation of short stories also make up You're a Good Man, Charlie Brown (both the stage musical and animated special), Snoopy!!! The Musical (both the stage musical and animated special), and Charlie Brown's Christmas Tales. Schulz first toyed with using vignettes in the 1973 special There's No Time for Love, Charlie Brown.

There are a number of storylines:

- "School": Charlie Brown, Sally Brown, Lucy van Pelt, Linus van Pelt, and Schroeder are going to school. The others are going into third grade, but Sally is going into first grade.
- "Kite": Charlie Brown is flying a kite while Snoopy is resting, and Lucy and Linus are talking about Edgar Allan Poe.
- "Charlie Brown's School Days": Charlie Brown, Linus, Sally, Peppermint Patty, and Franklin are going to school.
- "Sally": Sally, Eudora, and Snoopy are at summer camp. Eudora teases Snoopy.
- "Linus and Sally": Linus is reading his report on summer camp. Miss Othmar is horrified by references to queen snakes. Charlie Brown is worried because he studied the wrong chapter, and Sally refuses to draw a cow leg.
- "Peppermint Patty": Peppermint Patty is having trouble in school and tries to find a private one to attend instead. Following Snoopy's advice, she goes to the Ace Obedience School and quickly graduates from it, not realizing it is a dog school. The teacher and principal from Peppermint Patty's elementary school do not believe she has already graduated. When she finds out what has happened, she ends up fighting the vicious cat next door, mistaking him for Snoopy.
- "Linus": Linus and Sally are going on a field trip. Linus is reunited with Truffles. Sally and Truffles fight over Linus and he gets stuck on a farm roof. It is up to Snoopy and Woodstock to save him.
- "Piano": Lucy annoys Schroeder while he is playing his piano. Lucy throws the piano down the sewer. Schroeder tries to get it back with Charlie Brown's help. As Schroeder walks away almost crying, Lucy says that if he were to play it now, he'd strike a "sewer note". She laughs for a while then explains after he loved her, he'd appreciate the humor. When Schroeder tries to call the piano company, Lucy yells over the phone for the company to take its time on delivery.
- "Lucy": Lucy is very angry and feels she has nothing for which to be thankful. She wants Linus to get logs for the fireplace, playing jokes on him and talking about Abraham Lincoln while he fetches them.
- "Peppermint Patty and Marcie": Marcie tries to make some baseball caps for Peppermint Patty's team.
- "Charlie Brown": Charlie Brown gets sick and goes to the hospital. Sally takes the opportunity to move into his room but Peppermint Patty, Marcie and Lucy are worried about him. Lucy promises that, if Charlie Brown gets better, she will never pull the football away from him again. Linus tells Charlie Brown's mother about this. When Charlie Brown recovers, Lucy is forced to go through with her promise. However, Charlie Brown misses the ball and kicks Lucy's hand. She says that next time Charlie Brown goes to the hospital, he should stay there.

== Voice cast ==
- Michael Mandy as Charlie Brown
- Kristen Fullerton as Lucy van Pelt
- Earl Reily as Linus van Pelt
- Cindi Reily as Sally Brown
- Casey Carlson as Eudora and Truffles
- Shannon Cohn as Marcie
- Brent Hauer as Peppermint Patty
- Christopher Donohoe as Schroeder and Franklin
- Bill Melendez as Snoopy and Woodstock

== Production notes ==
Although Lucy taunts Charlie Brown to kick the football in this special, this is the first time she promises never to pull it away again. When Charlie Brown gets ill at a ball game, Lucy promises never to pull the ball away. She does not pull the ball away when Charlie Brown gets better, but he misses and kicks her arm, resulting in her arm being encased in a cast. Charlie Brown is mentioned as kicking it in the It's Magic, Charlie Brown special.

It was the second (and last) episode for Kristen Fullerton as Lucy van Pelt, after when Sydney Penny voiced Lucy in It's Magic, Charlie Brown, Penny decided she would let Fullerton voice Lucy in this episode, she voiced Lucy in Life Is a Circus, Charlie Brown and A Charlie Brown Celebration, in the next special, Fullerton was replaced by Angela Lee.

This is the first hour-long animated Peanuts special.

== Stock footage ==
Scenes from this special recycle footage and ideas from There's No Time for Love, Charlie Brown (1973) and Play It Again, Charlie Brown (1971).

In The Charlie Brown and Snoopy Show episode "Linus' Security Blanket" the scene where Charlie Brown and his kite get stuck in a tree is different, but in You Can't Win, Charlie Brown the scene where Charlie Brown, Snoopy, Lucy and Linus are caught up with his kite on the doghouse is the same.

== Home media ==
A Charlie Brown Celebration was released on VHS in 1987 by Kartes Communications, and again in 1995 from Paramount Home Video, and on DVD from Warner Home Video on October 4, 2016, when it was paired with the 50th anniversary DVD for Charlie Brown's All-Stars.

On October 7, 2025, it was released on the DVD and Blu-Ray collection Peanuts: 75th Anniversary Ultimate TV Specials Collection along with 39 other Peanuts specials.
