= Dick Deadeye =

Dick Deadeye is a character in:

- H.M.S. Pinafore
- Dick Deadeye, or Duty Done
