= Scott Beach =

American actor, DJ and writer (1931–1996)

- Born: Alvin Scott Beach; January 13, 1931; Portland, Oregon, U.S.
- Died: February 13, 1996 (aged 65); San Francisco, California, U.S.
- Occupations: Actor, writer, DJ
- Years active: 1964–1995
- Spouse: Neva Beach
- Children: 2

Alvin Scott Beach (January 13, 1931 – February 13, 1996) was an American actor, writer and DJ, best known for his performance in the 1960s-themed 1973 film American Graffiti.

== Life and career ==
Born Alvin Scott Beach, he appeared in numerous motion pictures, most notably as a German scientist patterned after Wernher von Braun in The Right Stuff. His deep voice was often heard in films. He once said that director George Lucas liked his voice and often used him in his films, beginning with THX 1138. Beach also appeared as Mr. Gordon in American Graffiti and provided an uncredited stormtrooper voice in Star Wars.

Beach was an early and beloved performer at the original Renaissance Pleasure Faires in Agoura and Novato, California, where for many years he portrayed the Lord Mayor of the Shire and was a mentor and an inspiration to many aspiring actors. Along with his acting career, Beach was a natural for radio and was on the staff of KSFO in San Francisco, California. During a radio broadcast on January 28, 1973, he reported that the Agreement on Ending the War and Restoring Peace in Viet Nam had been signed on the previous day in Paris, France. That agreement, also known as the Paris Peace Accords, ended direct U.S. military involvement in the Viet Nam War. Beach concluded his report about the peace agreement by stating, "I fear that the last U.S. soldier to die in Vietnam is still alive." He was correct; the last American death in Viet Nam was not until April 29, 1975 (see McMahon and Judge). Beach also served as the original announcer on The Newlywed Game after being beaten out for the hosting job by Bob Eubanks; Johnny Jacobs eventually replaced Beach as announcer.

Beach twice served as the narrator in performances of Arthur Honegger's King David with the Masterworks Chorale of San Mateo, California. He also narrated other performances of the oratorio in both the original French and the English translation used by the Masterworks Chorale. He was the host of the San Francisco Opera broadcasts over KKHI during the early 1970s. Beach also provided the voice of the comic strip cat Garfield in the character's first television appearance in the 1980 anthology special The Fantastic Funnies; he was later replaced in that role by Lorenzo Music.

== Personal life ==
Beach was married to Neva Beach, together they had two children; Dylan and Sarah. Dylan and Sarah voiced Charlie Brown and Lucy Van Pelt (respectively) in It's Arbor Day, Charlie Brown.

== Death ==
Beach died on February 13, 1996, at the California Pacific Medical Center at the age of 65.

== Filmography ==
=== Film ===
Year	Title	Role	Notes
1964	Too Tough to Care	Ramshaw	Educational short film
1968	Bullitt	Man	Uncredited
1969	The Shepherd	Narrator	Short Film
1970	The Miller's Tale	Narrator (voice)	Short Film
1971	THX 1138	Announcer (voice)	
1972	One is a Lonely Number	Frawley King	Credited as A. Scott Beach
1973	American Graffiti	Mr. Gordon	
1973	Bizarre Devices	Radio Host	
1974	The Second Coming of Suzanne	Reporter	
1975	The Grizzly & the Treasure	Narrator (voice)	Uncredited
1977	Star Wars: Episode IV – A New Hope	Stormtrooper (voice)	Uncredited
1980	Bon Voyage, Charlie Brown (and Don't Come Back!!)	Waiter / Baron / Driver / Tennis Announcer / English Voice / American Male (voice)	
1981	Chu Chu and the Philly Flash	Harry	
1982	Out	Sailor	
1983	The Right Stuff	Chief Scientist	
1983	To Be or Not to Be	Narrator	
1986	Stand by Me	Mayor Grundy	
1988	Tucker: The Man and His Dream	Floyd Cerf	
1993	Mrs. Doubtfire	Judge	
1994	Getting Even with Dad	Wino	

=== Television ===
Year	Title	Role	Notes
1979	You're the Greatest, Charlie Brown	Announcer (voice)	TV special
1980	She's a Good Skate, Charlie Brown	Coach / Announcer (voice)	TV special
1980	Life Is a Circus, Charlie Brown	Announcer (voice)	TV special
1986	Blacke's Magic	Pemberton	Episode: "Breathing Room (Pilot)
1990	Midnight Caller	Vinnie Delano	Episode: "Three for the Money"
1994	You're in the Super Bowl, Charlie Brown	Announcer (voice)	TV special

=== Video games ===
Year	Title	Role	Notes
1995	Psychic Detective	Drunk Inmate	

== Discography ==
=== Singles ===
Year	Title	Notes
1976	"Religion and Politics"	Rereleased in Dr. Demento's Dementia Royale (1980)
