= Morville-le-Héron =

- Commune
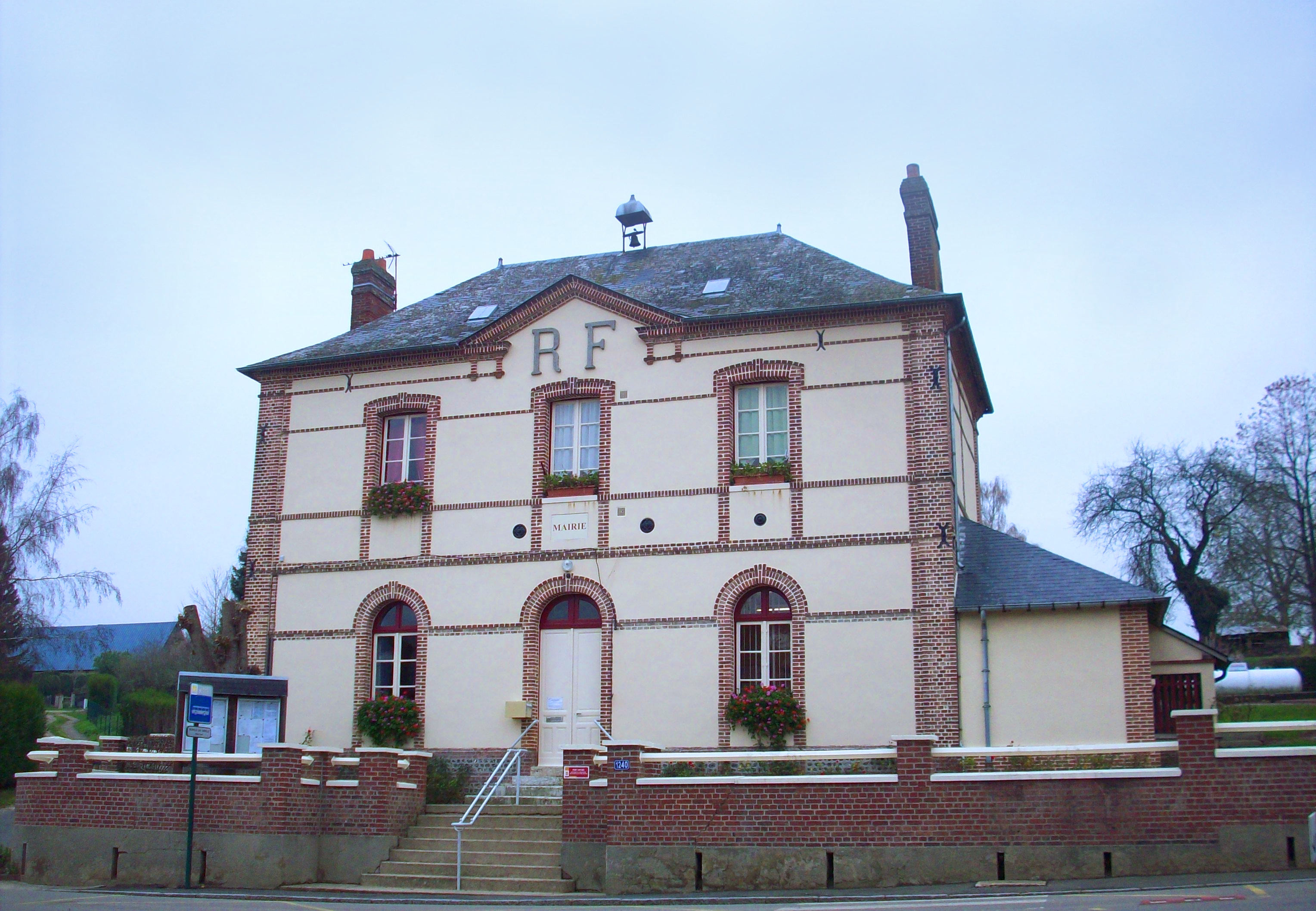
- The town hall in Morville-sur-Andelle
- Location of Morville-le-Héron
- Location within France Location within Normandy
- Coordinates: 49°28′40″N 1°25′56″E
- Country: France
- Region: Normandy
- Department: Seine-Maritime
- Arrondissement: Dieppe
- Canton: Gournay-en-Bray
- Intercommunality: CC 4 rivières

Government
  - Mayor (2026–32): Patrick Frere
- Area^{1}: 15.89 km^{2} (6.14 sq mi)
- Highest elevation: 183 m (600 ft)
- Lowest elevation: 62 m (203 ft)
- Population (2023): 538
  - Density: 33.9/km^{2} (87.7/sq mi)
- Time zone: UTC+01:00 (CET)
  - Summer (DST): UTC+02:00 (CEST)
- INSEE/Postal code: 76455 /76780
- ^{1} French Land Register data, which excludes lakes, ponds, glaciers > 1 km^{2} (0.386 sq mi or 247 acres) and river estuaries.

Morville-le-Héron (French pronunciation: [mɔʁvil lə eʁɔ̃]) is a commune in the Seine-Maritime department in the Normandy region in northern France. It was formed on 1 January 2025, with the merger of Morville-sur-Andelle and Le Héron.

== See also ==
- Communes of the Seine-Maritime department
