= Tooth Brushing =

- Genre: Educational film
- Created by: Charles M. Schulz
- Directed by: Bill Melendez
- Voices of: Arrin Skelley; Daniel Anderson; Michelle Muller; Bill Melendez
- Opening theme: "Heartburn Waltz"
- Composer: Vince Guaraldi
- Country of origin: United States
- Original language: English

Production
- Executive producer: Lee Mendelson
- Producer: Bill Melendez
- Running time: 5 minutes

Original release
- Release: 1978

Related
- It's Dental Flossophy, Charlie Brown

Tooth Brushing is a short educational film based upon the comic strip Peanuts, by Charles M. Schulz. It was originally created in 1978 for the American Dental Association. The film was directed by Bill Melendez, in the style of the animated Peanuts TV specials which aired on CBS. It was distributed to schools in 16 mm film format.

== Plot ==
Charlie Brown is seen leaving the office of Dr. Jones, his dentist, in a happy and excited mood, as the dentist has given him instructions on proper tooth brushing. He encounters Snoopy on the way home and asks his dog to join him to practice the techniques. They reach the van Pelt house, where Linus invites them inside. In the van Pelt bathroom, Charlie Brown shares what he learned with Linus and Snoopy. As Charlie Brown explains how to brush their teeth properly, both Linus and Snoopy demonstrate the desired techniques, clearly shown so the audience can see. Snoopy uses Lucy's toothbrush, much to Linus' horror. Lucy returns home to find her brother and friends gathered in the bathroom. Charlie Brown begins to explain how he is teaching them the proper brushing techniques, but Lucy cuts him off mid-sentence and proceeds, in her usual confident fashion, to demonstrate her own abilities (Snoopy quickly replaces Lucy's toothbrush on the counter before she notices). As Charlie Brown and Linus react with disgust, Lucy uses her brush (wondering why it is still wet) to prove that she is the best at brushing her teeth. As Charlie Brown and Snoopy leave, Charlie scolds Snoopy to "never use anyone else's toothbrush!" He also tells Linus that the dentist wants him to return soon for instructions on the proper use of dental floss; while he says this, Snoopy takes out a packet of floss and snaps a short piece, twirls it between his fingers, and uses it. Charlie Brown then remarks, "Good grief! Why can't I have a normal dog like everyone else?". He then walks away, followed by Snoopy.

== Voices ==
- Charlie Brown: Arrin Skelley
- Linus van Pelt: Daniel Anderson
- Lucy van Pelt: Michelle Muller
- Snoopy: Bill Melendez

These are the same voice actors used on the CBS animated Peanuts specials of the era.

== Music score ==
Tooth Brushing was produced following the death of longtime Peanuts television specials composer Vince Guaraldi. Several variations of "Heartburn Waltz," taken from the score of Be My Valentine, Charlie Brown (1975) were used throughout.

== Sequels ==
A second Peanuts educational film about teeth, It's Dental Flossophy, Charlie Brown, was released in 1979.
