= Over Her Dead Body (2008 film) =

- Theatrical release poster
- Directed by: Jeff Lowell
- Written by: Jeff Lowell
- Produced by: Peter Safran; Paul Brooks
- Starring: Eva Longoria Parker; Paul Rudd; Lake Bell; Lindsay Sloane; Jason Biggs
- Cinematography: John Bailey
- Edited by: Matt Friedman
- Music by: David Kitay
- Production companies: Gold Circle Films; The Safran Company
- Distributed by: New Line Cinema
- Release date: February 1, 2008
- Running time: 95 minutes
- Country: United States
- Language: English
- Budget: $10 million
- Box office: $21.5 million

Over Her Dead Body is a 2008 American romantic comedy film starring Eva Longoria, Paul Rudd, Lake Bell, Lindsay Sloane and Jason Biggs. It was written and directed by Jeff Lowell. The film is about Kate (Longoria), who dies on the day of her wedding to fiancé Henry (Rudd). He subsequently begins a relationship with psychic Ashley (Bell) who becomes haunted by Kate trying to sabotage their relationship.

The film was released in the United States and Canada on February 1, 2008. It received negative reviews from critics.

== Plot ==
Kate and Henry are a happy couple. Henry proposed to Kate and they are about to be married, but on the day of their wedding, Kate is accidentally killed by an ice sculpture angel, because of the actions of an ice sculptor. Unaware that she has died and her soul left her body, Kate awakens in Purgatory and wastes time arguing with an angel who finally leaves before she can explain to Kate what she must do to move on.

A year later, Henry's sister Chloe hopes he will find closure by consulting Ashley, a psychic who also runs a catering business with her gay best friend Dan. After an unsuccessful first meeting, Chloe gives Kate's diary to Ashley so she can pretend to communicate with Kate and convince Henry to move on with his life. In the process, Henry and Ashley fall in love with each other, much to the consternation of Kate, who has been watching over Henry. When Kate voices her displeasure, Ashley hears her, unaware of what it means.

Angry over Ashley's deception and uncertain of what she is supposed to do, Kate later encounters the ice sculptor and discovers that he is also a ghost (a result of a drunk driving crash). He explains to her that they must deal with their unfinished business. Believing that her job is to protect Henry, Kate proceeds to harass Ashley (who is the only one who can see or hear Kate). Using her ghostly abilities of intangibility, levitation, and auditory hallucination, Kate hopes to force Ashley to break up with Henry. Ashley persists, but then Henry discovers the fraud with the diary and breaks off the relationship. Despondent over the break-up, Ashley turns to Dan for solace but is further distraught when Dan reveals that he is not gay and has secretly been in love with her for years. Over time, Ashley and Dan eventually reconcile.

After several months of watching Henry fall back into a depressed funk, Kate encounters the sculptor once more, who points out that if she had resolved her unfinished business, she would have moved on to Heaven by now. When the sculptor asks her what she really wants, Kate reluctantly admits that she only wants Henry to be happy, and realizes that he could be happy with Ashley. Then the sculptor reveals that Kate is his unfinished business and he has to get her to do the right thing before moving on, which he does. Kate first attempts to convince Ashley to get back together with Henry but Ashley does not believe her change of heart, and is preparing to fly to Las Vegas with Dan. In desperation, Kate finds she is able to talk to Henry through his pet parrot and gets him to meet Ashley at the airport. Realizing that Henry has forgiven her and that she has Kate's blessing, Ashley joyfully embraces Henry. At their wedding, Ashley delays her walk down the aisle to sit briefly in the back pew, to promise Kate that she will strive to make Henry happy. Also at the wedding, Dan makes a new connection with Chloe. Now ready to move on, Kate arrives once more in Purgatory, congratulated for her efforts by the angel, and requests the "orb of true light" collected from Kate's loved ones. The angel leaves once again, leaving Kate in Purgatory.

== Cast ==
- Eva Longoria as Kate (as Eva Longoria Parker)
- Paul Rudd as Henry
- Lake Bell as Ashley
- Lindsay Sloane as Chloe
- Stephen Root as Ice Sculptor
- Kali Rocha as the Angel
- W. Morgan Sheppard as Father Marks
- Sam Pancake as Bill
- Jason Biggs as Dan

== Reception ==
=== Critical response ===
On Rotten Tomatoes, the film has an approval rating of 14% based on 107 reviews and an average rating of 3.7/10. The site's critical consensus reads, "With few laughs and little romantic chemistry, Over Her Dead Body lacks the ingredients of a successful romantic comedy." On Metacritic, the film has a score of 30 out of 100 based on 29 critics, indicating "generally unfavorable reviews". Audiences polled by CinemaScore gave the film an average grade of "C+" on an A+ to F scale.

The film received an overall "C" grade from critics on Yahoo! Movies. Matt Pais of the Chicago Tribune said it "is all talk and not much action, and if it weren’t for Rudd and Bell bringing a few sly details to the party there wouldn’t be any party at all." A. O. Scott of The New York Times said "...could be much worse. But it also could have been, with a little more effort, a lot better."

James Berardinelli of ReelViews called it "as mediocre a motion picture as you're likely to find in a multiplex this season." Sean Axmaker of the Seattle Post-Intelligencer said "...it's as flat as day-old soda, a comedy completely lacking in bubbles or fizz." Radio Times gave the film one star out of five: "There's nothing worse than a bungled comedy, but this just might be it."

=== Box office ===
The film opened in eleventh place at the box office with US$4 million in its opening weekend. As of October 5, 2008, the film had grossed a total of $21,458,111 worldwide.

== Home media ==
The film was released on DVD on May 6, 2008.

== See also ==
- List of ghost films
- Kiss Me Goodbye
- Truly Madly Deeply
