= Patricia Patts =

American actress, singer, songwriter and entrepreneur (b. 1967)

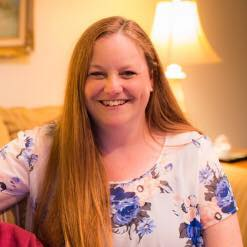
- Born: Patricia Ann Patts; July 31, 1967 (age 58); Sacramento, California, U.S.
- Occupation(s): Actress, singer, songwriter, author, entrepreneur
- Years active: 1977–present
- Known for: Voice of Peppermint Patty, Annie (musical)

Patricia Patts (born July 31, 1967) is an American actress, singer, songwriter and entrepreneur. She played the lead role in the 1978 Los Angeles touring production of Annie, and the voice of Peppermint Patty on the Peanuts TV specials from 1979 to 1980.

== Biography ==
Patts was born July 31, 1967, in California. She is one of five children, all of whom were involved in acting or music. She started as a child actor in the early 1970s performing in local theatre companies in the Pasadena area. At age six, she appeared in her first commercial for Mama Celeste Pizza.

Patts attended Pasadena Alternative School and, while a student, was appointed to a student trustee's position on the Pasadena Board of Education.

In 1977, Norman Lear was casting for a new version of The Little Rascals. Patts had originally auditioned for the role of Darla, but since she wasn't the Darla type, they wrote in a new role for her; Rocky. That year she also had a small role in the short lived TV show, A Year at the Top. In 1978, she auditioned, along with 2,000 other girls, for a role in the Los Angeles touring production of Annie. She won the title role and went on to play the part in San Francisco and Los Angeles between 1978 and 1979. At the same time, she was also the voice of Peppermint Patty for the Peanuts cartoons.

Patts went on to work on a number of television shows including Archie Bunker's Place, TV 101, Student Exchange (TV movie), The Judge, K*I*D*S, and A Place to Call Home (TV movie). She also has roles in the films Party Line and For Keeps.

In 2013, Patts opened a business called Write Off the Row. In 2017, in anticipation of the 40th Anniversary of the musical Annie, she was invited by Inside Edition to New York to celebrate the musical. She was featured on the news show singing "Something was Missing" from Annie.

She currently lives outside of Nashville, Tennessee.

== Filmography ==
Year	Title	Role	Notes
1977	The Little Rascals	Rocky	Series Regular
1977	A Year at the Top	Patricia	Guest
1979	You're the Greatest, Charlie Brown	Peppermint Patty	TV special Voice Over
1980	She's a Good Skate, Charlie Brown	Peppermint Patty	TV special Voice Over
1980	Bon Voyage, Charlie Brown (And Don't Come Back!)	Peppermint Patty	Movie Voice Over
1980	The Fantastic Funnies	Herself	TV special
1983	Archie Bunker's Place	Cathy Berger	Guest
1983	K*I*D*S	Penny	PBS TV Series Regular - Emmy Award, Best Series for Children & Youth
1987	Student Exchange	Dancer	TV movie
1987	A Place to Call Home	Sarah Gavin	TV movie
1987	The Judge	Amish Girl	Guest
1988	Party Line	Jennifer	Feature Film Lead
1988	For Keeps	Desdemona	Feature Film
1989	TV 101	Sandy	Guest
2025	The Red Room	Caretaker	Short, Silent Film Released on Youtube
2025	The Empty House	Aunt	Short, Silent Film Released on Youtube

== Theater ==
Year	Show	Role	Theater
1978-1979	Annie	Annie	Curran Theater/Shubert Theater
1995	Unsinkable Molly Brown	Molly Brown	Glendale Center Theater
1997	Annie	A Star is Born	TPAC
2004	Dickens of a Christmas	Ghost of Christmas Present	Boiler Room Theater

== Discography ==
Year	Artist	Song title	Album title
2016	Erin Mclendon	When God Made a Woman	Making It Up As We Go
2016	Amy Taylor	Kids Again	Amy Taylor
