= Bill Melendez =

American animator and voice actor (1916–2008)

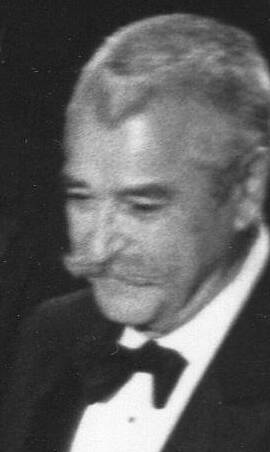
- Melendez in 1987
- Born: José Cuauhtémoc Melendez; November 15, 1916; Hermosillo, Sonora, Mexico
- Died: September 2, 2008 (aged 91); Santa Monica, California, U.S.
- Other names: C. Melendez; J.C. Melendez; William Melendez
- Occupations: Animator; director; producer; voice actor
- Years active: 1938–2006
- Employers: Walt Disney Productions (1938–1941); Warner Bros. Cartoons (1941–1949); UPA (1949–1953)
- Notable work: Peanuts animated specials
- Spouse: Helen Melendez (m. 1940)
- Children: 2, including Steven C. Melendez

José Cuauhtémoc "Bill" Melendez (November 15, 1916 – September 2, 2008) was a Mexican-American animator, director, producer, and voice actor. Melendez was known for working on the Peanuts animated specials, as well as providing the voices of Snoopy and Woodstock. Before Peanuts, he previously worked as an animator for Walt Disney Productions, Warner Bros. Cartoons, and UPA.

In a career spanning over 60 years, he won six Primetime Emmy Awards and was nominated for thirteen more. In addition, he was nominated for an Oscar and five Grammy Awards. The two Peanuts specials, A Charlie Brown Christmas and What Have We Learned, Charlie Brown?, which he directed, were each honored with a Peabody Award.

== Early life ==
A native of Hermosillo, Sonora, Mexico, Melendez was educated in American public schools in Douglas, Arizona. He later attended the Chouinard Art Institute in Los Angeles (which would later become California Institute of the Arts).

== Early animation work (1935–1961) ==
On completion of his studies, Melendez found his first job at a lumber mill. After watching Snow White and the Seven Dwarfs, he gained employment at Disney in 1938, where he worked as an assistant animator to Hawley Pratt whom he befriended and worked together to developed a naval game with toy ships. He worked on what are now considered classics: Pinocchio, Fantasia, Dumbo, and Bambi and he worked once as an animator for a Donald Duck short, The Flying Jalopy. Following the 1941 Disney strike, Melendez was hired by Leon Schlesinger Productions, later known as Warner Bros. Cartoons, where he served as animator on the Looney Tunes and Merrie Melodies series. He worked in Bob Clampett's unit, first as an assistant animator for Rod Scribner, and then as a full animator starting with Wagon Heels, that was also his first on-screen credit as "C. Melendez". After Clampett's departure in 1945, the unit was given to Arthur Davis. When the number of animation units at Warner Bros. was reduced from four to three in 1947, Melendez along with Emery Hawkins moved to Robert McKimson's unit for some time.

After animating several shorts for McKimson, Melendez was fired by producer Edward Selzer. Afterwards, he moved over to United Productions of America (UPA), where he animated on cartoons such as Gerald McBoing-Boing (1950). Melendez also produced and directed thousands of television commercials, first at UPA, then John Sutherland Productions and Playhouse Pictures. In 1963, Melendez founded his own studio in the basement of his Hollywood home. As of 2009, Bill Melendez Productions is still active and is run by his son Steven C. Melendez. In addition to animation, Melendez was once a faculty member at the University of Southern California's Cinema Arts Department.

Melendez would also be referenced in the 1961 Looney Tunes short The Pied Piper of Guadalupe, where his name was used for a music instructor for Sylvester to learn how to play the flute. At that point, Melendez has been away from Warner Bros. for ten years.

== Peanuts franchise (1959–2006) ==
In 1959, while at Playhouse Pictures, Melendez was hired to do some animated television commercials featuring characters from the comic strip Peanuts for the Ford Motor Company. These animations were seen by documentary producer Lee Mendelson, and Mendelson hired Melendez to do some interstitial animations for a film he was producing about the comic strip entitled A Boy Named Charlie Brown.

Melendez was the only person Peanuts creator Charles M. Schulz trusted to turn his popular comic creations into television specials. He and his studio worked on every single television special and direct-to-video film for the Peanuts gang and Melendez directed the majority of them. He provided the vocal effects for Snoopy and Woodstock in every single production, voice acting the characters in the studio by uttering gibberish, and the voices were mechanically sped up at different speeds to represent the two different characters, although some later specials had Snoopy speaking in a clear voice, reflecting how he would be thinking to himself in the comics.

According to an article in The New York Times published shortly after his death, Melendez did not intend to do voice acting for the two characters. "Schulz would not countenance the idea of a beagle uttering English dialogue, Mr. Melendez recited gibberish into a tape recorder, sped it up and put the result on the soundtrack." He also directed, did the animation for, and provided voice acting in the first four Peanuts theatrical films, A Boy Named Charlie Brown (1969), Snoopy Come Home (1972), Race for Your Life, Charlie Brown (1977), and Bon Voyage, Charlie Brown (1980), as well as the video games Get Ready for School, Charlie Brown! (1995) and Snoopy's Campfire Stories (1996).

The last Peanuts-related production he worked on was He's a Bully, Charlie Brown (2006). Melendez and Lee Mendelson, who also worked on the Peanuts specials, films, and TV shows, formed their own production team and did other animated specials. They were responsible for the first two Garfield animated specials, Here Comes Garfield (1982) and Garfield on the Town (1983), as well as Frosty Returns (1992), the pseudo-sequel to Rankin/Bass' Frosty the Snowman (1969).

== National Student Film Institute ==
During the 1980s and 1990s Melendez served on the advisory board of the National Student Film Institute.

== Death ==
Melendez died at Saint John's Health Center in Santa Monica, California, on September 2, 2008, at the age of 91. No cause of his death was made public, but he had been in declining health after a fall a year earlier. Melendez was cremated and his ashes were given to his family.

=== Posthumous return to Peanuts ===
Archive recordings of his work as Snoopy and Woodstock were used for the film The Peanuts Movie. This makes him the only member of the film's cast to have been involved in a previous Peanuts project, save for Kristin Chenoweth, who won a Tony Award for her performance as Sally Brown in You're a Good Man, Charlie Brown on Broadway. Melendez also has archival recordings on the film's game, Snoopy's Grand Adventure.

== Melendez Films ==
Bill Melendez Productions Melendez Films Melendez Features, Inc.
- Type: Privately held
- Industry: Animation; Film
- Founded: 1962 (as Bill Melendez Productions)
- Founder: Steven C. Melendez; Bill Melendez
- Headquarters: London, England, United Kingdom; Burbank, California, United States; Hermosillo, Sonora, Mexico
- Key people: J.C. Melendez; Steven C. Melendez; Kaj Melendez; Mirza-Javed Melendez
- Products: Animated feature films
- Number of employees: 70 (at peak)
- Divisions: Mendelson/Melendez Productions
- Website: Bill Melendez Inc

Melendez Films (formerly Bill Melendez Productions and Melendez Features, Inc.) is a film animation studio. It was founded in 1962 by Steven C. Melendez, the son of Bill. The studio produced the ambitious animated feature film Dick Deadeye, based on the operettas of Gilbert and Sullivan. In 1979 the company produced a one-and-a-half-hour television special based on the C.S. Lewis classic book The Lion, the Witch and the Wardrobe, and the film subsequently won two Emmy Awards for "best animated film" and "script adaptation". Melendez Films has also produced many series for television including "Fred Basset" and "The Perishers", as well as educational mini films like Molly and the Skywalkerz for PBS, which were not rebroadcast for a couple of decades and did not surface on home media until after the 1998 VHS debut.

The company continues to create commercials in France, Italy, Spain, the Netherlands, Germany, Greece and Sweden as well as the UK and the U.S. working for clients such as Scandinavian Airlines, Schick, British Rail, Colgate, Ferrero, and the British Government.

=== Mendelson/Melendez Productions ===
Mendelson/Melendez Productions
- Formerly: Lee Mendelson/Bill Melendez Productions
- Predecessor: Playhouse Pictures
- Founded: 1965
- Founders: Lee Mendelson; Bill Melendez
- Defunct: 2006
- Fate: Retirement of co-founder Bill Melendez
- Successor: Film Roman; Lee Mendelson Film Productions; Bill Melendez Productions
- Products: Peanuts; Garfield (until 1983); The Fantastic Funnies; No Man's Valley
- Owner: Lee Mendelson Film Productions; Bill Melendez Productions

Mendelson/Melendez Productions (sometimes credited as Mendelson-Melendez Productions and formerly as Lee Mendelson/Bill Melendez Productions or Lee Mendelson Film Productions) was an American animation studio founded in 1965 and was active until Melendez's retirement in 2006. It was mostly famous for its Peanuts animated specials.

== Filmography ==
=== Films ===
| Year | Film | Animator | Producer | Director | Actor | Role | Notes |
|---|---|---|---|---|---|---|---|
| 1940 | Pinocchio | Yes | No | No | No | | Assistant animator |
| 1940 | Fantasia | Yes | No | No | No | | Assistant animator |
| 1941 | Dumbo | Yes | No | No | No | | Assistant animator |
| 1942 | Bambi | Yes | No | No | No | | Assistant animator |
| 1943 | The Flying Jalopy | Yes | No | No | No | | |
| 1943 | A Corny Concerto | Yes | No | No | No | | Assistant animator |
| 1943 | Falling Hare | Yes | No | No | No | | Assistant animator |
| 1943 | An Itch in Time | Yes | No | No | No | | Assistant animator |
| 1945 | Draftee Daffy | Yes | No | No | No | | Assistant animator |
| 1945 | Wagon Heels | Yes | No | No | No | | |
| 1945 | The Bashful Buzzard | Yes | No | No | No | | |
| 1946 | Book Revue | Yes | No | No | No | | |
| 1946 | Baby Bottleneck | Yes | No | No | No | | |
| 1946 | Kitty Kornered | Yes | No | No | No | | |
| 1946 | The Great Piggy Bank Robbery | Yes | No | No | No | | |
| 1946 | The Big Snooze | Yes | No | No | No | | |
| 1947 | Goofy Gophers | Yes | No | No | No | | |
| 1947 | The Foxy Duckling | Yes | No | No | No | | |
| 1947 | Doggone Cats | Yes | No | No | No | | |
| 1947 | Mexican Joyride | Yes | No | No | No | | |
| 1947 | Catch as Cats Can | Yes | No | No | No | | |
| 1948 | Two Gophers from Texas | Yes | No | No | No | | |
| 1948 | What Makes Daffy Duck | Yes | No | No | No | | |
| 1948 | A Hick a Slick and a Chick | Yes | No | No | No | | |
| 1948 | Nothing But the Tooth | Yes | No | No | No | | |
| 1948 | Bone Sweet Bone | Yes | No | No | No | | |
| 1948 | The Rattled Rooster | Yes | No | No | No | | |
| 1948 | Dough Ray Me-ow | Yes | No | No | No | | |
| 1948 | The Pest That Came to Dinner | Yes | No | No | No | | |
| 1948 | Odor of the Day | Yes | No | No | No | | |
| 1948 | The Stupor Salesman | Yes | No | No | No | | |
| 1948 | Riff Raffy Daffy | Yes | No | No | No | | |
| 1949 | Holiday for Drumsticks | Yes | No | No | No | | |
| 1949 | Porky Chops | Yes | No | No | No | | |
| 1949 | Bowery Bugs | Yes | No | No | No | | |
| 1949 | Bye, Bye Bluebeard | Yes | No | No | No | | |
| 1949 | A Ham in a Role | Yes | No | No | No | | |
| 1950 | Punchy de Leon | Yes | No | No | No | | |
| 1950 | Boobs in the Woods | Yes | No | No | No | | |
| 1950 | Spellbound Hound | Yes | No | No | No | | |
| 1950 | The Leghorn Blows at Midnight | Yes | No | No | No | | |
| 1950 | The Miner's Daughter | Yes | No | No | No | | |
| 1950 | An Egg Scramble | Yes | No | No | No | | |
| 1950 | What's Up Doc? | Yes | No | No | No | | |
| 1950 | It's Hummer Time | Yes | No | No | No | | |
| 1950 | Giddyap | Yes | No | No | No | | |
| 1950 | Trouble Indemnity | Yes | No | No | No | | |
| 1950 | A Fractured Leghorn | Yes | No | No | No | | |
| 1950 | Pop 'im Pop! | Yes | No | No | No | | |
| 1950 | Gerald McBoing-Boing | Yes | No | No | No | | |
| 1950 | Bushy Hare | Yes | No | No | No | | |
| 1950 | Dog Collared | Yes | No | No | No | | |
| 1950 | Albert in Blunderland | Yes | No | No | No | | |
| 1951 | Hare We Go | Yes | No | No | No | | |
| 1951 | Bungled Bungalow | Yes | No | No | No | | |
| 1951 | A Fox in a Fix | Yes | No | No | No | | |
| 1951 | Corn Plastered | Yes | No | No | No | | |
| 1951 | Georgie and the Dragon | Yes | No | No | No | | |
| 1951 | The Wonder Gloves | Yes | No | No | No | | |
| 1952 | The Oompahs | Yes | No | No | No | | |
| 1952 | Willie the Kid | Yes | No | No | No | | |
| 1952 | Madeline | Yes | No | No | No | | |
| 1953 | Little Boy with a Big Horn | Yes | No | No | No | | |
| 1953 | Christopher Crumpet | Yes | No | No | No | | |
| 1953 | Gerald McBoing-Boing's Symphony | Yes | No | No | No | | |
| 1954 | Ballet-Oop | Yes | No | No | No | | |
| 1954 | It's Everybody's Business | Yes | No | No | No | | |
| 1957 | Energetically Yours | Yes | No | Yes | No | | |
| 1963 | It's a Mad, Mad, Mad, Mad World | Yes | No | No | No | | |
| 1969 | A Boy Named Charlie Brown | No | Yes | Yes | Yes | Snoopy | |
| 1970 | The Rainbow Bear | Yes | No | Yes | No | | |
| 1972 | Snoopy Come Home | No | Yes | Yes | Yes | Snoopy, Woodstock | |
| 1975 | Dick Deadeye, or Duty Done | No | No | Yes | No | | |
| 1975 | Escape to Witch Mountain | Yes | No | No | No | | |
| 1977 | Race for Your Life, Charlie Brown | No | Yes | Yes | Yes | Snoopy, Woodstock | |
| 1978 | Tooth Brushing | No | Yes | Yes | Yes | Snoopy | |
| 1980 | Bon Voyage, Charlie Brown (and Don't Come Back!!) | No | Yes | Yes | Yes | Snoopy, Woodstock | |
| 1985 | Molly and the Skywalkerz: Happily Ever After | No | No | Yes | No | | Television film for PBS, later, VHS video |
| 1989 | Molly and the Skywalkerz: Two Daddies? | No | No | Yes | No | | Television film for PBS, later, VHS video |
| 1992 | Cool World | Yes | No | No | No | | |
| 2015 | The Peanuts Movie | No | No | No | Yes | Snoopy, Woodstock | archival recordings |

=== Television ===
| Year | Film | Animator | Producer | Director | Actor | Role | Notes |
|---|---|---|---|---|---|---|---|
| 1956 | The Gerald McBoing-Boing Show | Yes | No | No | No | | 1 episode: The Election/The Fifty-First Dragon/Twirlinger Twins in the Ballet Lesson |
| 1960 | The Bugs Bunny Show | Yes | No | No | No | | classic cartoons |
| 1963 | A Boy Named Charlie Brown | Yes | No | Yes | Yes | Snoopy | |
| 1965 | A Charlie Brown Christmas | No | Yes | Yes | Yes | Snoopy | |
| 1966 | Charlie Brown's All Stars! | No | Yes | Yes | Yes | Snoopy | |
| 1966 | It's the Great Pumpkin, Charlie Brown | No | Yes | Yes | Yes | Snoopy | |
| 1967 | You're in Love, Charlie Brown | No | Yes | Yes | Yes | Snoopy | |
| 1968 | He's Your Dog, Charlie Brown | No | Yes | Yes | Yes | Snoopy | |
| 1968 | The Bugs Bunny/Road Runner Hour | Yes | No | No | No | | classic cartoons |
| 1969 | Turn-On | Yes | No | No | No | | 1 episode |
| 1969 | It Was a Short Summer, Charlie Brown | No | Yes | Yes | Yes | Snoopy | |
| 1971 | Play It Again, Charlie Brown | No | Yes | Yes | Yes | Snoopy | |
| 1971 | Babar Comes to America | No | Yes | Yes | No | | |
| 1972 | You're Not Elected, Charlie Brown | No | Yes | Yes | Yes | Snoopy, Woodstock | |
| 1973 | There's No Time for Love, Charlie Brown | No | Yes | Yes | Yes | Snoopy | |
| 1973 | A Charlie Brown Thanksgiving | No | Yes | Yes | Yes | Snoopy, Woodstock | |
| 1974 | It's a Mystery, Charlie Brown | No | Yes | No | Yes | Snoopy, Woodstock | |
| 1974 | It's the Easter Beagle, Charlie Brown | No | Yes | No | Yes | Snoopy, Woodstock | |
| 1974 | Yes Virginia, There Is a Santa Claus | No | Yes | Yes | No | | |
| 1975 | Be My Valentine, Charlie Brown | No | Yes | No | Yes | Snoopy, Woodstock | |
| 1975 | You're a Good Sport, Charlie Brown | No | Yes | No | Yes | Snoopy, Woodstock | |
| 1976 | It's Arbor Day, Charlie Brown | No | Yes | No | Yes | Snoopy, Woodstock | |
| 1976 | The Sylvester & Tweety Show | Yes | No | No | No | | classic cartoons |
| 1977 | It's Your First Kiss, Charlie Brown | No | Yes | No | Yes | Snoopy, Woodstock | |
| 1978 | What a Nightmare, Charlie Brown! | No | Yes | Yes | Yes | Snoopy | |
| 1979 | You're the Greatest, Charlie Brown | No | Yes | No | Yes | Snoopy, Woodstock | |
| 1979 | The Lion, the Witch and the Wardrobe | No | No | Yes | No | | Also credited for story adaptation |
| 1980 | She's a Good Skate, Charlie Brown | No | Yes | No | Yes | Snoopy | |
| 1980 | Life Is a Circus, Charlie Brown | No | Yes | No | Yes | Snoopy | |
| 1981 | It's Magic, Charlie Brown | No | Yes | No | Yes | Snoopy, Woodstock | |
| 1981 | Someday You'll Find Her, Charlie Brown | No | Yes | No | Yes | Snoopy, Woodstock | |
| 1981 | No Man's Valley | No | Yes | Yes | No | | |
| 1982 | A Charlie Brown Celebration | No | Yes | Yes | Yes | Snoopy, Woodstock | |
| 1982 | Here Comes Garfield | No | Yes | No | No | | |
| 1983 | Is This Goodbye, Charlie Brown? | No | Yes | No | Yes | Snoopy, Woodstock | |
| 1983 | It's an Adventure, Charlie Brown | No | Yes | Yes | Yes | Snoopy, Woodstock | |
| 1983 | What Have We Learned, Charlie Brown? | No | Yes | Yes | Yes | Snoopy, Woodstock | |
| 1983 | Garfield on the Town | No | Yes | No | No | | |
| 1983–1985 | The Charlie Brown and Snoopy Show | No | Yes | Yes | Yes | Snoopy, Woodstock | |
| 1984 | It's Flashbeagle, Charlie Brown | No | Yes | Yes | Yes | Snoopy, Woodstock | |
| 1985 | Snoopy's Getting Married, Charlie Brown | No | Yes | Yes | Yes | Snoopy, Woodstock, Spike | |
| 1985 | The Romance of Betty Boop | No | Yes | Yes | No | | |
| 1985 | It's Your 20th Television Anniversary, Charlie Brown | No | Yes | Yes | Yes | Snoopy | |
| 1985 | You're a Good Man, Charlie Brown | No | Yes | No | Yes | Snoopy (non-speaking), Woodstock | |
| 1986 | Happy New Year, Charlie Brown! | No | Yes | Yes | Yes | Snoopy, Woodstock | |
| 1987 | Cathy | No | Yes | No | No | | |
| 1988 | Snoopy: The Musical | No | Yes | No | Yes | Snoopy (non-speaking), Woodstock | |
| 1988 | It's the Girl in the Red Truck, Charlie Brown | No | Yes | No | Yes | Spike | |
| 1988 | Cathy's Last Resort | No | Yes | No | No | | |
| 1988–1989 | This Is America, Charlie Brown | No | Yes | Yes | Yes | Snoopy, Woodstock | Also credited as writer for 4 episodes |
| 1989 | Cathy's Valentine | No | Yes | No | No | | |
| 1990 | You Don't Look 40, Charlie Brown | No | Yes | Yes | Yes | Himself | |
| 1990 | Why, Charlie Brown, Why? | No | Yes | No | Yes | Snoopy, Woodstock | |
| 1990 | Merrie Melodies: Starring Bugs Bunny and Friends | Yes | No | No | No | | classic cartoons |
| 1991 | Snoopy's Reunion | No | Yes | No | Yes | Snoopy, Snoopy's Siblings | |
| 1992 | It's Spring Training, Charlie Brown | Yes | Yes | No | Yes | Snoopy, Woodstock | |
| 1992 | It's Christmastime Again, Charlie Brown | No | Yes | Yes | Yes | Snoopy, Woodstock | |
| 1992 | Frosty Returns | No | Yes | Yes | No | | |
| 1994 | You're in the Super Bowl, Charlie Brown | No | Yes | Yes | Yes | Snoopy, Woodstock | |
| 1995 | That's Warner Bros.! | Yes | No | No | No | | classic cartoons |
| 1997 | It Was My Best Birthday Ever, Charlie Brown | No | Yes | Yes | Yes | Snoopy, Woodstock | |
| 2000 | Here's to You, Charlie Brown: 50 Great Years | No | Yes | Yes | Yes | Snoopy, Woodstock | |
| 2000 | It's the Pied Piper, Charlie Brown | No | Yes | Yes | Yes | Snoopy | |
| 2002 | A Charlie Brown Valentine | No | Yes | Yes | Yes | Snoopy | |
| 2002 | Charlie Brown's Christmas Tales | No | Yes | No | Yes | Snoopy, Woodstock | |
| 2003 | Lucy Must Be Traded, Charlie Brown | No | Yes | Yes | Yes | Snoopy | |
| 2003 | I Want a Dog for Christmas, Charlie Brown | No | Yes | Yes | Yes | Snoopy, Woodstock, Spike | |
| 2006 | He's a Bully, Charlie Brown | No | Yes | Yes | Yes | Snoopy, Woodstock | |
| 2008 | Peanuts Motion Comics | No | No | No | Yes | Snoopy | archival recordings |

=== Video games ===
| Year | Game | Animator | Producer | Director | Actor | Role | Notes |
|---|---|---|---|---|---|---|---|
| 1995 | Get Ready for School, Charlie Brown! | Yes | Yes | Yes | Yes | Snoopy, Woodstock | |
| 1996 | Snoopy's Campfire Stories | Yes | No | Yes | Yes | Snoopy, Woodstock | |
| 2015 | The Peanuts Movie: Snoopy's Grand Adventure | No | No | No | Yes | Snoopy, Woodstock | archival recordings |
