= Lindsay Sloane =

American actress (born 1977)

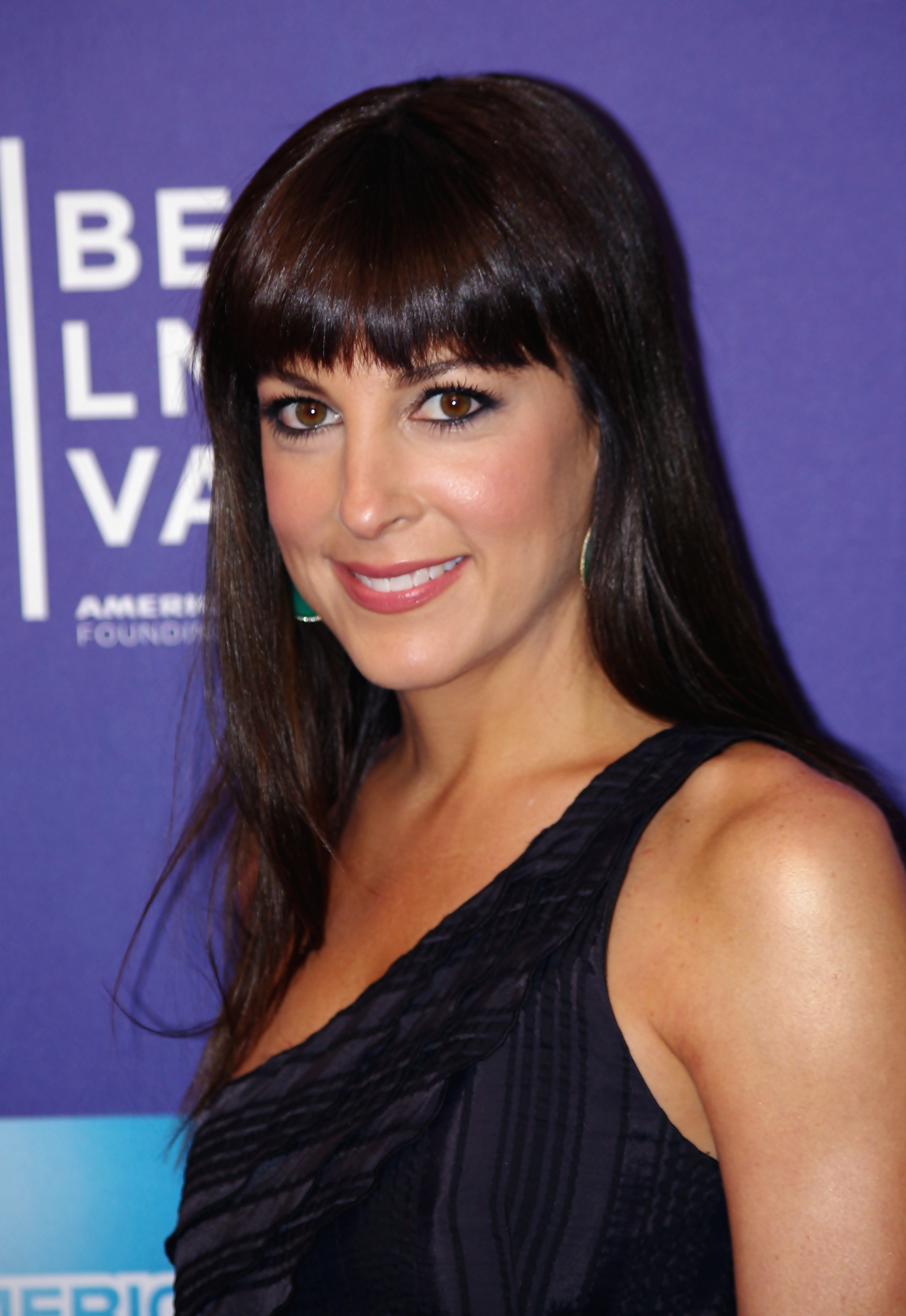
- Sloane at the 2011 Tribeca Film Festival premiere of A Good Old Fashioned Orgy.
- Born: Lindsay Sloane Leikin; August 8, 1977 (age 49); Long Island, New York, U.S.
- Occupation: Actress
- Years active: 1990–present
- Spouse: Dar Rollins (m. 2004)
- Children: 2

Lindsay Sloane Leikin-Rollins (born August 8, 1977) is an American actress. She is known for playing Valerie Birkhead on Sabrina the Teenage Witch (1997–99) and Emily in The Odd Couple (2015–17). She has also starred in films such as Bring It On (2000), Over Her Dead Body (2008), She's Out of My League (2010), The Other Guys (2010), Horrible Bosses (2011), and its sequel Horrible Bosses 2 (2014).

== Early life ==
Lindsay Sloane Leikin was born on Long Island to Renée, a children's librarian, and Joey Leikin, a sales manager. She is Jewish. She attended Chatsworth High School in Chatsworth, Los Angeles.

== Career ==
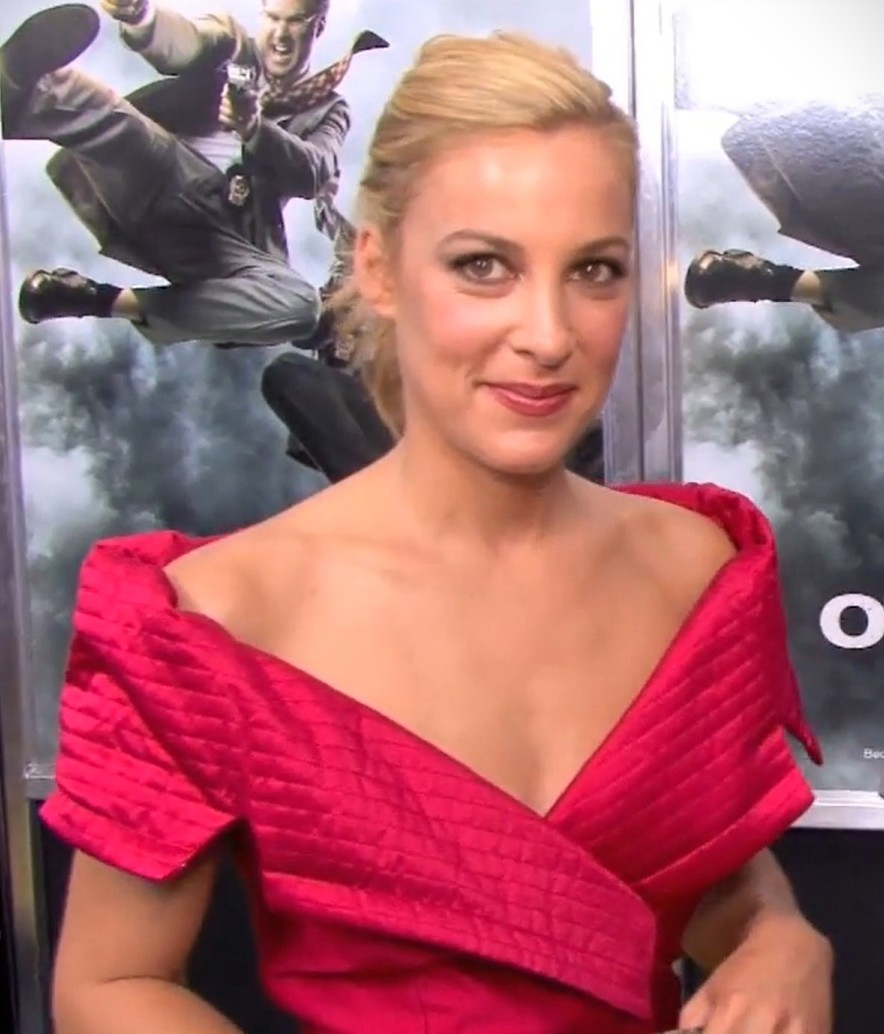
Sloane at premiere of her film The Other Guys in 2010

After moving to Los Angeles, Sloane signed with an agent at the age of eight. Her mother once drove her to an audition through the 1992 LA Riots. Her first recurring television role was as Alice Pedermeir on The Wonder Years from 1991 to 1993. She played Zoey Miller for seven episodes on the short-lived NBC sitcom Mr. Rhodes. She later played Valerie Birkhead on Sabrina the Teenage Witch from 1997 to 1999, and starred in Sabrina Down Under, a spinoff movie to the series as a different character, a mermaid named Fin. Sloane joined the casts of the short-lived series Grosse Pointe and The Stones. She auditioned unsuccessfully for many roles in a number of television shows including Blossom and Full House.

Sloane also appeared in episodes of Dharma & Greg, My So-Called Life, That '70s Show, The West Wing, Entourage, Greg the Bunny, How I Met Your Mother, The League, and Psych. Sloane was featured in the seventh season of Weeds, playing Maxeen, a character who hires Silas for a modeling gig and dates Andy. Most recently, she appeared in the main cast of the CBS sitcom The Odd Couple as Emily.

Her film résumé includes roles in Bring It On, Exposed, The In-Laws, Nancy Drew, Sabrina Down Under, Over Her Dead Body, She's Out of My League, The Other Guys and The Accidental Husband. She voiced the older sister in Why, Charlie Brown, Why?. As well as a guest role as Stephanie in Mr. Sunshine, Sloane also appears in the movie Horrible Bosses as Charlie Day's character's fiancée Stacy and in the 2011 movie A Good Old Fashioned Orgy.

== Personal life ==
In 2004, Sloane met and later married Dar Rollins, a talent agent's assistant, who became an agent for International Creative Management. The couple have two daughters.

== Filmography ==
=== Film ===
Year	Title	Role	Notes
1998	Win a Date	Dalia	Short film
1999	Seven Girlfriends	Daphne	
2000	Bring It On	Big Red	
2003	The In-Laws	Melissa Peyser	
2003	Exposed	Minnie	
2004	Dog Gone Love	Rebecca	
2006	The TV Set	Laurel Simon	
2007	Nancy Drew	Boutique Clerk	Uncredited
2008	Over Her Dead Body	Chloe Mills	
2008	The Accidental Husband	Marcy	
2009	Water Pills	Mary	Short film
2009	The Six Wives of Henry Lefay	Autumn	
2010	She's Out of My League	Marnie	
2010	The Other Guys	Francine	
2010	Worst Enemy	Stacy	Short film
2011	A Good Old Fashioned Orgy	Laura LaCarubba	
2011	Horrible Bosses	Stacy Arbus	
2012	Darling Companion	Ellie	
2014	Horrible Bosses 2	Stacy Arbus	
2019	Endings, Beginnings	Billie	

=== Television ===
Year	Title	Role	Notes
1990	Why, Charlie Brown, Why?	Big Sister (voice)	Television film
1991–1993	The Wonder Years	Alice Pedermeir	Recurring role; 6 episodes
1994	My So-Called Life	Ruthie	Episode: "Halloween"
1995	CBS Schoolbreak Special	Tina	Episode: "Between Mother and Daughter"
1996–1997	Mr. Rhodes	Zoey Miller	Regular role; 8 episodes
1997	Promised Land	Rebecca Gold	Episode: "Intolerance"
1997	Working	Debbie Rainer	Episode: "Close Quarters"
1997	Dharma & Greg	Jennifer	Episode: "Haus Arrest"
1997–1999	Sabrina the Teenage Witch	Valerie Birkhead	Regular role; 50 episodes
1999	Batman Beyond	Jackie Wallace	Episode: "Earth Mover"; voice role
1999	Sabrina Down Under	Fin	Television film
1999	Student Affairs	Wendy	Television film
2000	That '70s Show	Patty	Episode: "Eric Gets Suspended" & "Kitty and Eric's Night Out"
2000	The West Wing	Zoey's classmate	Episode: "Six Meetings Before Lunch"
2000	M.Y.O.B.	Summer Raynes	Episode: "Boys in the Band"
2000–2001	Grosse Pointe	Marcy Sternfeld	Main role; 17 episodes
2001	The Fighting Fitzgeralds	Officer Gloria	Episode: "Blood, Sweat & Fitz"
2001	Going to California	Lisa B.	Recurring role; 3 episodes
2002	Greg the Bunny	Chelsea	Episode: "Jewel Heist"
2002	Homeward Bound	Rebecca Ashton	Television film
2003	Strange Frequency	Lara	Television film
2003	Miss Match	Daphne	Episode: "Matchmaker, Matchmaker"
2004	The Stones	Karly Stone	Main role; 7 episodes
2004	DeMarco Affairs	Sammy DeMarco	Television film
2005	The X's	Skipper	Episode: "License to Slumber/Three Days of the Coin Op"; voice role
2006	Entourage	Nicole	Episode: "I Wanna Be Sedated"
2006–2007	Help Me Help You	Sasha Hoffman	Recurring role; 4 episodes
2009	Pulling	Donna	Television film
2009	How I Met Your Mother	Jen	Episode: "Double Date"
2010	Livin' on a Prayer	Gina	Television film
2010	The League	Lindsay	Episode: "Kegel the Elf"
2011	Mr. Sunshine	Stephanie	Episode: "Heather's Sister"
2011	Funny or Die Presents	Various	Recurring role; 3 episodes
2011	Weeds	Maxeen	Recurring role; 3 episodes
2011	Childrens Hospital	Pat	Episode: "Home Is Where the Hospital Is"
2012	Ben and Kate	Louise	Episode: "Emergency Kit"
2012	The League	Lindsay	Episode: "Our Dinner with Andre"
2012	Psych	Melinda	Episode: "Shawn and the Real Girl"
2014	Psych	Sandra Panitch	Episode: "Remake A.K.A. Cloudy... With a Chance of Improvement"
2014	Kroll Show	Carrie Stitz	Episode: "Banff Is on Fire"
2014	Drunk History	Nancy Reagan	Episode: "Hollywood"
2014	Really	Margaret	Episode: "Pilot"
2014–2017	Playing House	Tina Steigerman	Recurring role; 8 episodes
2015	Childrens Hospital	Roxanne	Episode: "Just Like Cyrano de Bergerac"
2015–2017	The Odd Couple	Emily	Regular role; 38 episodes
2017	I'm Sorry	Grocery Woman	Episode: "Weekend Alone"
2023	The Wonder Years	Judy Hitman	Episode: "Blockbusting"

=== Video games ===
Year	Title	Role	Notes
1999	Lands of Lore III	Goldy	Voice role
