= Bon Voyage, Charlie Brown (and Don't Come Back!!) =

1980 American animated comedy-drama film

- Theatrical release poster
- Directed by: Bill Melendez
- Written by: Charles M. Schulz
- Based on: Peanuts by Charles M. Schulz
- Produced by: Bill Melendez; Lee Mendelson
- Starring: Arrin Skelley; Daniel Anderson; Patricia Patts; Casey Carlson; Annalisa Bortolin; Laura Planting; Bill Melendez
- Edited by: Roger Donley; Chuck McCann
- Music by: Ed Bogas; Judy Munsen
- Production companies: Bill Melendez Productions; Lee Mendelson Film Productions
- Distributed by: Paramount Pictures
- Release date: May 30, 1980
- Running time: 76 minutes
- Country: United States
- Language: English
- Box office: $2 million

Bon Voyage, Charlie Brown (and Don't Come Back!!) is a 1980 American animated mystery comedy film based on the Peanuts comic strip by Charles M. Schulz. It is the fourth full-length feature film in the Peanuts series. Directed by Bill Melendez from a screenplay by Schulz, it stars the voices of Arrin Skelley, Daniel Anderson, Patricia Patts, Casey Carlson, Annalisa Bortolin, and Laura Planting. The film follows Charlie Brown and his friends as they travel to France as foreign exchange students, while simultaneously learning about a mysterious letter sent by the niece of a local baron.

Bon Voyage, Charlie Brown was released in the United States on May 30, 1980 and grossed $2 million domestically. It was the last film produced during Schulz's lifetime, and the last one until The Peanuts Movie (2015).

== Plot ==
At Charlie Brown's school, Linus Van Pelt introduces to his class two French students, Babette and Jacques, who will be spending two weeks there to get accustomed to the United States. In exchange, Charlie Brown and Linus are chosen to visit France. Charlie Brown heads home and invites Snoopy and Woodstock to go with him. He gets a call from Peppermint Patty, who tells him that she and Marcie were also chosen to go to France as a student exchange. Charlie Brown also gets a letter from France, but cannot read it because it is written in French. He is not very positive about the trip because of the letter he got, but Marcie, who has been studying French, translates the letter, explaining that Charlie Brown has been invited to stay at the Château du Mal Voisin (House of the Bad Neighbor). Charlie Brown cannot understand why someone in France would invite him to their home, let alone know who he is.

The group arrive first in London and travel across the English Channel to France via hovercraft. Upon their arrival, they rent a Citroën 2CV, which is driven by Snoopy as the children are too young to drive. Peppermint Patty and Marcie go to stay at a farm in Morville-sur-Andelle, where they meet a local boy named Pierre. Marcie and Pierre develop a mutual attraction between them, but Peppermint Patty convinces herself that Pierre likes her. In Le Héron, Charlie Brown, Linus, Snoopy, and Woodstock camp outside the chateau, which is owned by a reclusive baron. His niece, Violette Honfleur, frequently leaves Charlie Brown and Linus food.

Linus eventually enters the chateau's attic and learns from Violette that Charlie Brown's grandfather, Silas, had served in the United States Army, and helped them during World War II. The baron returns home and Violette tries hiding Linus, but she inadvertently starts a fire in the attic. Charlie Brown runs to get Peppermint Patty and Marcie and Pierre summons the fire department, while Snoopy and Woodstock get an old fashioned fire hose from a shed. The children rescue Linus and Violette while Snoopy uses the hose to keep the fire under control until the fire department arrives.

Thankful for the chateau's rescue, the baron allows the gang inside and Charlie Brown learns the truth behind the mysterious letter he received from Violette: one of the villagers toured the United States when he got a haircut from Charlie Brown's father, whereupon Violette was able to find Silas's grandson. Charlie Brown later bids Violette and Pierre goodbye as he, Snoopy, Woodstock, Linus, Peppermint Patty, and Marcie leave to see more of the French countryside.

== Voice cast ==
- Arrin Skelley as Charlie Brown
- Daniel Anderson as Linus van Pelt
- Patricia Patts as Peppermint Patty
- Casey Carlson as Marcie
- Annalisa Bortolin as Sally Brown
- Laura Planting as Lucy van Pelt
- Bill Melendez as Snoopy, Woodstock
- Pascale De Barolet as Pierre
- Roseline Rubens as Violette Honfleur, Violet, Patty, Frieda and Sophie
- Debbie Muller as Flight Attendant
- Scott Beach as Waiter, Baron, Driver, Tennis Announcer, English Voice and American Male

== Production ==
Schulz stated that he conceived the idea for the story while visiting the Manoir de Malvoisine in Le Héron, a location where he had been briefly stationed as a soldier during World War II. The château serves as a central setting in the film.

This production is among the few instances within the Peanuts media franchise — and the sole theatrical film — in which adult characters are both visible and intelligible.

== Reception ==
The film had a mixed reception. On Rotten Tomatoes, the film has two negative reviews and one positive review from three critics.

== Home media ==
Paramount Home Entertainment released the film on VHS, Betamax and LaserDisc in the 1980s in 4:3 format. It was released on DVD on October 6, 2015, with the image cropped to widescreen, followed by a Blu-ray release as part of the four-film Snoopy Collection on May 18, 2021. The film was subsequently released as a standalone Blu-ray in the US on March 15, 2022.

== See also ==
- What Have We Learned, Charlie Brown?
- Peanuts filmography
