= Steven C. Melendez =

American film director and producer (born 1945)

- Born: Steven Cuitlahuac Melendez; October 19, 1945 (age 80); Los Angeles, California, U.S.
- Occupations: Film director, producer, animator, film editor
- Years active: 1966–present
- Spouse: Brita Melendez
- Father: Bill Melendez

Steven Cuitlahuac Melendez (born October 19, 1945) is an American film and television director, producer and animator. He is the second son of Peanuts animator Bill Melendez.

== Biography ==
He was born in Los Angeles where he gained his early experience in film as an editor with Bill Melendez Productions working on an early Peanuts special, Babar the Elephant, a suite of commercials and the feature film A Boy Named Charlie Brown.

Melendez moved to London in 1970 to establish the studio's European office where he produced numerous television and cinema commercials, the feature film Dick Deadeye, and the animated adaptation of The Lion, the Witch and the Wardrobe, for which he won an Emmy.

== Career ==
Melendez's worked on the 1979 animated television adaptation of The Lion, the Witch and the Wardrobe, which he produced for CBS.
