= Raggedy Ann and Andy in The Pumpkin Who Couldn't Smile =

- TV Guide ad
- Written by: Chuck Jones
- Directed by: Chuck Jones
- Starring: Daws Butler; June Foray; Steven Rosenberg; Les Tremayne
- Theme music composer: Earl Robinson
- Country of origin: United States
- Original language: English

Production
- Producer: Chuck Jones
- Running time: 30 minutes
- Production companies: Chuck Jones Enterprises; Bobbs-Merrill Company

Original release
- Network: CBS
- Release: October 31, 1979

Raggedy Ann and Andy in The Pumpkin Who Couldn't Smile (a.k.a. simply The Pumpkin Who Couldn't Smile) is a 1979 animated Halloween television special featuring Raggedy Ann and Raggedy Andy. Produced, directed and written by Chuck Jones, it was first televised October 31, 1979 on CBS. The special was a sequel to the 1978 Christmas special, Raggedy Ann and Andy in The Great Santa Claus Caper.

== Synopsis ==
Raggedy Ann (June Foray), Raggedy Andy (Daws Butler), and their dog, Raggedy Arthur, notice how cruel their neighbor Aunt Agatha (Foray) is and how sad her nephew Ralph (Steven Rosenberg) is on Halloween but realize that Aunt Agatha has a Scrooge-like attitude towards the holiday. At first, the Raggedeys seem upset with how Aunt Agatha treats her nephew and think that she is really mean to treat him in such a way by not allowing Ralph to go trick or treating with the rest of the children in the neighborhood. Then they come up with an idea on how to make Ralph happy. Raggedy Ann reasons that if there is an unhappy little boy where they live, then there must be an unhappy pumpkin somewhere out there waiting for a little boy. The Raggedeys set out to find the pumpkin who is just right for Ralph.

The abandoned pumpkin in the pumpkin patch (Les Tremayne) is very gloomy and emits pumpkin seeds as tears every time he weeps. The only way to cheer up a sad pumpkin is to take it to Ralph as a gift, and then persuade Aunt Agatha to change her Ebenezer Scrooge-like behavior on Halloween, by restoring, in her dreams, the memory of how Agatha (or Aggie, as she was called in her childhood) once wore a witch costume that she absolutely loved. Agatha wakes up and realizes that she was wrong on not allowing Ralph to go trick or treating and, discovering Ralph and the now smiling pumpkin in his room, greats the pumpkin. The film ends with Aunt Agatha putting on a witches' hat and carrying a broom while Ralph wears a pirate's costume. Both Aunt Agatha and Ralph merrily go trick or treating together and Aunt Agatha finds a newfound joy for the Halloween season.

== Voice cast ==
- June Foray as Raggedy Ann/Aunt Agatha (credited as Mrs. Hobart Donavan)/Neighbor
- Daws Butler as Raggedy Andy
- Steven Rosenberg as Ralph
- Les Tremayne as The Pumpkin

== Reception ==
The special brought in a 14.4/24 rating/share, ranking third in its timeslot, behind NBC's Real People (20.0/33) and ABC's Eight Is Enough (18.0/30).
