= Raggedy Ann and Andy in The Great Santa Claus Caper =

- 1993 UAV Corporation VHS cover
- Written by: Chuck Jones
- Directed by: Chuck Jones
- Starring: Daws Butler; June Foray; Les Tremayne
- Theme music composer: Dean Elliott
- Country of origin: United States
- Original language: English

Production
- Producers: Chuck Jones; Mary Roscoe
- Running time: 24 minutes
- Production companies: Chuck Jones Enterprises; The Bobbs-Merrill Company
- Budget: $375,000

Original release
- Network: CBS
- Release: November 30, 1978

Raggedy Ann and Andy in The Great Santa Claus Caper, a.k.a. simply The Great Santa Claus Caper, is an animated American television special featuring Raggedy Ann and Raggedy Andy. Produced by Chuck Jones Enterprises, the special was first broadcast November 30, 1978 on CBS. The special was followed in 1979 by Raggedy Ann and Andy in The Pumpkin Who Couldn't Smile. This is the first special to feature Jones' original character, a dog named Raggedy Arthur, who would go on to become a staple of Raggedy Ann merchandise.

Kellogg's and Parker Brothers were the special's primary advertisers in its original broadcast.

== Synopsis ==
Inventor and "in"-efficiency expert Alexander Graham Wolf, who looks and sounds like Wile E. Coyote, is planning to take over Santa's workshop. Overhearing this, Comet, one of Santa's reindeer, asks Raggedy Ann, Raggedy Andy, and their dog Raggedy Arthur to help her because they're easy to carry and aren't bothered by cold weather.

At the factory, Alexander is using a machine to encase all the toys in blocks of a transparent and unbreakable substance called gloopstik (made by the Gloopstik Corporation), to ensure that they'll last forever, even though the children won't be able to play with them. He then intends to charge the children for the gloopstik-encased toys and become rich.

After arriving, the Raggedies soon meet Alexander, and he tries to interest them with his machine. At first, Andy is intrigued by the idea, but Ann thinks that it's awful. However, when Alexander uses his machine to encase Arthur, both Raggedies become angry. Andy demands that Alexander change their dog right back. Within minutes, Alexander tries to do so to Andy and has the claw grab him and toss him in the machine, while Ann furiously protests and orders Alexander to put Andy down. When he tries to do so to Ann, Andy (who is unharmed) climbs out of the top of the machine and when he sees Alexander chasing Ann, he gets furious and takes control of the machine. He then encases Alexander in a Christmas tree-shaped block. Ann and Andy laugh until Alexander tells them that gloopstik is unbreakable. At which point they become really worried, and run, hug and tell Arthur that they still love him even though he's stuck. Then the block disintegrates, and the Raggedys realize that love is the one thing that can destroy the gloopstik. Breaking the fourth wall, they ask all the children at home to shout "LOVE", which causes all the gloopstik blocks to fall apart, including the one in which Alexander's trapped. Having learned his lesson, Alexander destroys his machine (by pushing a button that causes it to consume itself) and leaves the workshop, just before Santa wakes up.

== Voices ==
- June Foray as Raggedy Ann, Comet (uncredited)
- Daws Butler as Raggedy Andy
- Les Tremayne as Alexander Graham Wolf, Santa Claus (uncredited)

== Credits ==
- Production Designed by: Ray Aragon
- Written, Produced and Directed by: Chuck Jones
- Master Animators: Ben Washam, Virgil Ross, Phil Monroe, Ken Champin, Lloyd Vaughan, Irv Anderson, Manny Perez, Tom Ray
- Music Composed and Conducted by: Dean Elliott
- Backgrounds: Walt Peregoy
- Key Animator: Marlene Robinson
- Assistant Animators: Joe Roman, Carol Millican, Al Pabian, Bob Tyler, Jean Washam, Retta Davidson, Sammie Lanham
- Editor: Sam Horta · Horta Editorial and Sound, Inc.
- Camera: Animagraphics, Bemiller Camera
- Ink & Paint: Celine Miles with Paulino García DeMingo, Sue Dalton, Colene Gonzales, Anna Lois Ray, Staci Maniskas
- Graphics: Don Foster
- Production Checker: Margie Roach
- Assistant to the Producer: Marian Dern
- Associate Producer and Production Manager: Mary Roscoe
