= Le Héron =

Commune in Seine-Maritime, France

- Part of Morville-le-Héron
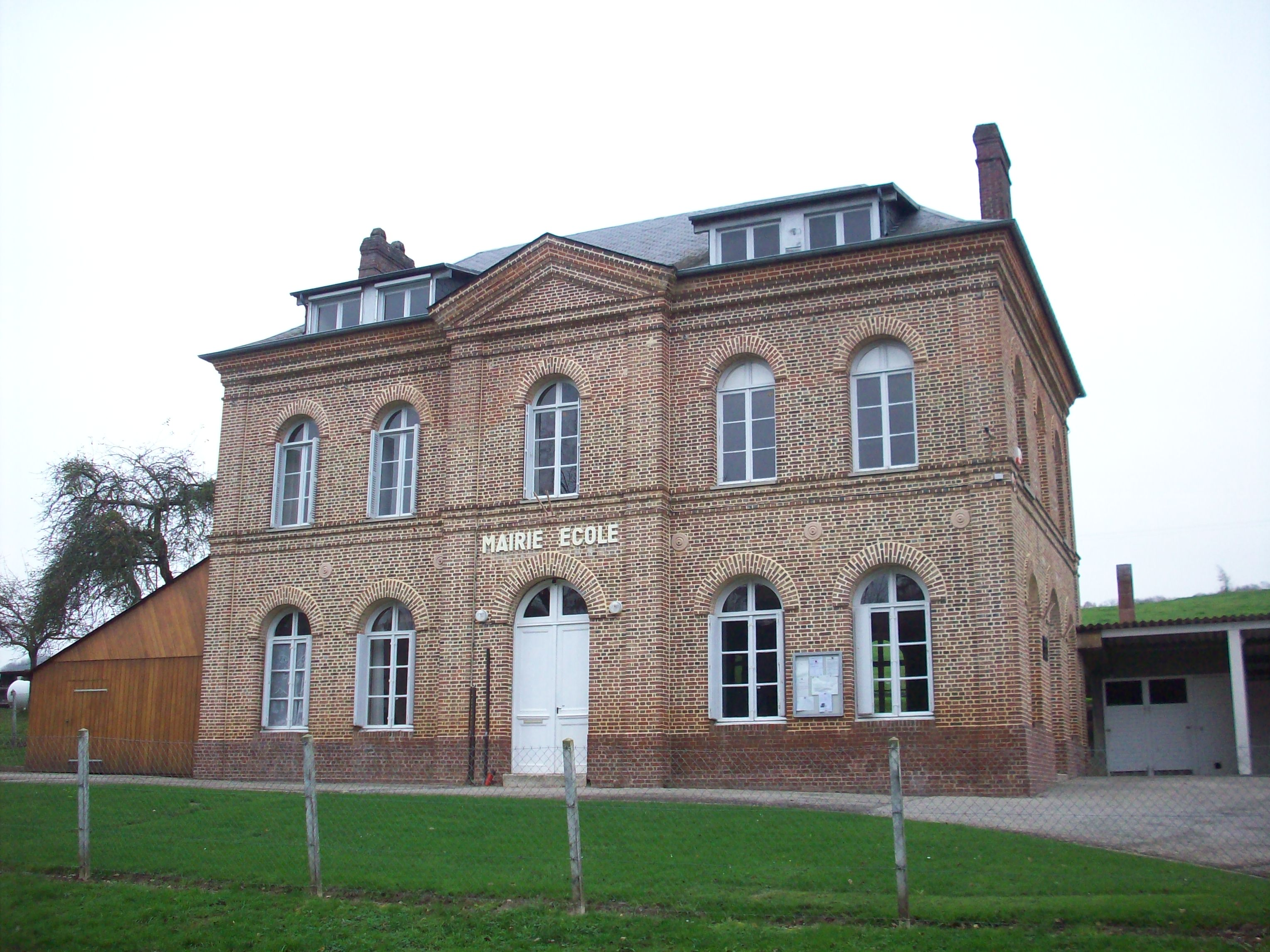
- The town hall and school in Le Héron
- Location of Le Héron
- Location within France Location within Normandy
- Coordinates: 49°29′51″N 1°23′39″E
- Country: France
- Region: Normandy
- Department: Seine-Maritime
- Arrondissement: Dieppe
- Canton: Gournay-en-Bray
- Commune: Morville-le-Héron
- Area^{1}: 10.72 km^{2} (4.14 sq mi)
- Elevation: 80 m (260 ft)
- Highest elevation: 183 m (600 ft)
- Lowest elevation: 62 m (203 ft)
- Population (2022): 250
  - Density: 23/km^{2} (60/sq mi)
- Time zone: UTC+01:00 (CET)
  - Summer (DST): UTC+02:00 (CEST)
- Postal code: 76780
- ^{1} French Land Register data, which excludes lakes, ponds, glaciers > 1 km^{2} (0.386 sq mi or 247 acres) and river estuaries.

Le Héron (French pronunciation: [lə eʁɔ̃], before 1962: Héron) is a former commune in the Seine-Maritime department in the Normandy region in north-western France. On 1 January 2025, it was merged into the new commune of Morville-le-Héron.

== Geography ==
A small forestry and farming village situated at the confluence of the small Héron river with the Andelle, some 16 miles (26 km) east of Rouen at the junction of the D 13, D 46 and the D 62 roads.

== Population ==
Historical population
Year	Pop.	±% p.a.
1968	233	—
1975	239	+0.36%
1982	242	+0.18%
1990	236	−0.31%
1999	231	−0.24%
2007	243	+0.64%
2012	246	+0.25%
2017	252	+0.48%
Source: INSEE

== Places of interest ==
- An eighteenth-century château and its park.
- The seventeenth-century fortified manorhouse at Malvoisine. Manoir de Malvoisine also appeared in the movie Bon Voyage, Charlie Brown (and Don't Come Back!!).
- A nineteenth-century chapel.
- The remains of the church of Notre-Dame et Saint-Gilles, dating from the twelfth century, burnt down in 1879.

== See also ==
- Communes of the Seine-Maritime department
