= Dick Deadeye, or Duty Done =

1975 British animated film by Bill Melendez

- Cover of VHS release
- Directed by: Bill Melendez
- Written by: Robin Miller; Leo Rost; Additional material: Gene Thompson; Victor Spinetti
- Story by: Robin Miller; Leo Rost
- Based on: The works of Gilbert and Sullivan
- Produced by: Steven C. Melendez
- Starring: Victor Spinetti; Peter Reeves; Miriam Karlin; Barry Cryer; Long John Baldry
- Edited by: Roger Donley; Steven Cuitlahuac Melendez; Babette Monteil
- Music by: Score: Jimmy Horowytz; Music: Arthur Sullivan; Lyrics: W. S. Gilbert; Additional lyrics: Robin Miller
- Production company: Bill Melendez Productions
- Distributed by: Cinema International Corporation
- Release dates: 1975 (United Kingdom); July 1976 (United States)
- Running time: 81 minutes
- Country: United Kingdom
- Language: English

Dick Deadeye, or Duty Done is a 1975 British animated musical comedy film directed by Bill Melendez and designed by Ronald Searle, based on the 19th century comic operas of Gilbert and Sullivan.

The comically convoluted plot, by Robin Miller and Leo Rost, with additional material by Gene Thompson and Victor Spinetti, is a pastiche of many of the Gilbert and Sullivan operas, particularly Trial by Jury, The Sorcerer, H.M.S. Pinafore, The Pirates of Penzance, Patience, Iolanthe and The Mikado, in which the protagonist, Able Seaman Dick Deadeye (voiced by Spinetti), is sent by Queen Victoria on a quest to recover the "Ultimate Secret" from the Sorcerer, who has stolen it. The music is borrowed from many Savoy operas, with new or modified lyrics by Robin Miller and orchestrations updated in a contemporary popular style by conductor Jimmy Horowytz.

== Plot ==
Queen Victoria sends Dick Deadeye, a sailor, to recover the "Ultimate Secret" from two thieves, the Sorcerer and his reptilian henchman, the Shameleon, who are trying to sell it to the Pirate King. At a military parade ("Entrance of the Peers"), Dick sees the Sorcerer speaking with the Pirate King. There, Nanki sees his evil twin brother Poo (same), who is picking pockets. Dick goes for backup to headquarters, the Hexagon ("Here's a how-dee-do"), finding the Captain and the Major-General ("I am the very model of a modern major general").

Dick proceeds to the pirates' lair, "The Queen's Nose" ("Oh, better far to live and die"). There, Rose Maybud, the barmaid, wants to find "a man of pure evil", so she can reform him. She and Dick have a moment ("Prithee, pretty maiden"), but she loses interest, since he is good. The Sorcerer and his sidekick arrive ("My name is John Wellington Wells"). The Pirate King finalises the deal to buy the Secret for a modest sum of pirate booty, and the Sorcerer goes to get it, followed by Dick.

Dick arrives at the Sorcerer's shop and asks for a potion to make him handsome ("Sprites of earth and air"); he tries to grab the Secret, but it falls through the window into the basket of Little Buttercup, a buxom seller of ribbons, laces and marine supplies. Poo steals the basket; everyone chases him, including three policemen ("A policeman's lot is not a happy one"), but they mistake Nanki for Poo and arrest him. The Judge at his trial ("All hail great Judge"; "Now, Jurymen, hear my advice") flirts with Buttercup ("I'm called Little Buttercup"), ignores Nanki's evidence ("A wandering minstrel I" and "I swear to tell the truth" based on "When I go out of door"), sentences Nanki to 200 years in the Tower of London ("A Judge is he, and a good judge too") and leaves with Buttercup.

At the Tower, Nanki muses on his lot and lost love ("Farewell my own"). The spirit of Yum-Yum is trapped in Nanki's shamisen ("Just as the moon must have the sun", based on "The sun whose rays") and needs Nanki "to make me a whole woman". Poo agrees to return the Secret to the Sorcerer in exchange for learning his tricks, but the pirates drag them to "The Queen's Neck". The Secret is in code, and the Sorcerer must decipher it. Since Poo is so evil, Rose decides to love him and intends to reform him. Meanwhile, at the Hexagon, Dick sees the Rear-Admiral and his sisters, cousins and aunts ("I am the monarch of the sea"). He gives the Captain ("He remains an Englishman") command of the Pinafore and allows Dick to recruit a crew from the prisoners. At the Tower, Nanki sings for the prisoners ("The flowers that bloom in the spring"), who nearly all enlist.

The Sorcerer and Poo are on the pirate ship ("Pour, oh pour the pirate sherry"). Rose, disguised as a pirate, sneaks aboard. Meanwhile, with the Judge, Major-General and Rear-Admiral, the Captain takes command of the Pinafore ("When I was a lad"; "We sail the ocean blue"; and "I am the Captain of the Pinafore"). They pursue the pirate ship, assisted by two giant cherubs ("Go, ye heroes"). Poo overfeeds the Sorcerer, who gets seasick and hands over the Secret. The two crews meet and greet each other warmly. The Pirate King fights the Captain, but the King's trousers fall, and the strawberry birthmark on his backside is seen. Buttercup reveals that as a wetnurse, she mixed up the infant Pirate King and Captain (recognisable by the birthmark; "A many years ago"); the King and the Captain swap clothes and titles.

Poo sails to the nearby island of Utopia with the Secret, now pursued by everyone ("With cat-like tread"). He meets the Regent of Utopia, Princess Zara and her court of singing showgirls ("Hail, hail, and how-dee-do", based on "With cat-like tread"; "Land of sand and sea and sun", in the style of The Beach Boys). Zara has Poo arrested. The Sorcerer regains the Secret and is chased by Dick and the former Pirate King. They find that the Secret is in mirror-writing and says: "It's love that makes the world go round" ("If you go in"). Nanki and Poo combine into a person composed of both good and evil. The shamisen releases the spirit of Yum Yum (the Queen of Utopia). The Sorcerer falls in love with Buttercup, while Rose and Dick are reunited. Once the Secret is out, war and crime cease around the world ("Here's a how-dee-do") and all live happily ever after ("Entrance of the Peers", reprise).

== Musical numbers ==
- "Entrance of the Peers" (Iolanthe)
- "Here's a how-dee-do" (The Mikado)
- "I am the very model of a modern major general" (The Pirates of Penzance)
- "Oh, better far to live and die" (Pirates)
- "Prithee, pretty maiden" (Patience)
- "My name is John Wellington Wells" (The Sorcerer)
- "Sprites of earth and air" (The Sorcerer)
- "A policeman's lot is not a happy one" (Pirates)
- "All hail great Judge" (Trial by Jury)
- "Now, Jurymen, hear my advice" (Trial)
- "I'm called Little Buttercup" (H.M.S. Pinafore)
- "A wandering minstrel I" (The Mikado)
- "I swear to tell the truth" ("When I go out of door" from Patience)
- "A Judge is he, and a good judge too" (Trial)
- "Farewell my own" (Pinafore)
- "Just as the moon must have the sun" ("The sun whose rays" from The Mikado)
- "I am the monarch of the sea" (Pinafore)
- "He remains an Englishman" (Pinafore)
- "The flowers that bloom in the spring" (The Mikado)
- "Pour, oh pour the pirate sherry" (Pirates)
- "When I was a lad" (Pinafore)
- "We sail the ocean blue" (Pinafore)
- "I am the Captain of the Pinafore" (Pinafore)
- "Go, ye heroes" (Pirates)
- "A many years ago" (Pinafore)
- "With cat-like tread" (Pirates)
- "Hail, hail, and how-dee-do" ("Come friends who plough the sea" from Pirates, combined with "Land of sand and sea and sun", in the style of The Beach Boys)
- "It's love that makes the world go round" (part of "If you go in" from Iolanthe)
- "Here's a how-dee-do" (reprise) (The Mikado)
- "Entrance of the Peers" (reprise)

== Cast ==
The following is the voice cast of the film, together with role(s) played, and the opera from which the character originated:

Role	Spoken by	Sung by	From Savoy opera
Dick Deadeye	Victor Spinetti	Victor Spinetti	H.M.S. Pinafore
John Wellington Wells	Peter Reeves	Peter Reeves	The Sorcerer
Captain of the Pinafore	Peter Reeves	Peter Reeves	Pinafore
The Pirate King	George A. Cooper	Ian Samwell	The Pirates of Penzance
The Prisoner	—	Ian Samwell	(Note: The Prisoner sings "The flowers that bloom in the Spring" from The Mikado)
Little Buttercup	Miriam Karlin	Miriam Karlin	Pinafore
Utopian Maiden	Miriam Karlin	Miriam Karlin	Utopia, Limited
Nanki	John Newton	Casey Kelly	The Mikado
Poo	John Newton	Casey Kelly	The Mikado
Queen Victoria	Beth Porter	—	—
Princess Zara	Beth Porter	—	Utopia
Yum-Yum	Beth Porter	Linda Lewis	Mikado
Rose Maybud	Julia McKenzie	Liza Strike	Ruddigore
Monarch of the Sea	Francis Ghent	Long John Baldry	Pinafore
Major General	Francis Ghent	Long John Baldry	Pirates
Judge	Barry Cryer	Barry Cryer	Trial by Jury
