= Quigley (musician) =

American social media influencer and musician

Casey Potter Carlson Goode, known professionally as Quigley, is an American social media influencer and electropop musician based in Van Nuys, California. She runs the "Officially Quigley" blog and Instagram page.

== Biography ==
Born Casey Potter Carlson, Goode is originally from Eden Prairie, Minnesota. In 2009, when she was still known as Casey Carlson, she auditioned for American Idol with a cover of "A Thousand Miles" by Vanessa Carlton. Making it to the top 36 she performed "Every Little Thing She Does is Magic" by the Police, but was eliminated by the judges (Randy Jackson, Kara DioGuardi, Paula Abdul, and Simon Cowell). She subsequently adopted the name "Quigley" and collaborated with Frankmusik on the 2012 EP Pleiades. She later released the 2015 EP Initium, which was her solo debut. It was preceded by the singles "Beginning of Anything" and "Lost Again". In 2019, she was a finalist in the "fashion" section of the 11th Shorty Awards.

== Discography ==
=== Extended plays ===
- Pleiades (2012)
- Initium (2015)
