= You're the Greatest, Charlie Brown =

1979 television special

- Genre: Animated television special
- Created by: Charles M. Schulz
- Directed by: Phil Roman
- Voices of: Arrin Skelley; Patricia Patts; Casey Carlson; Michelle Muller; Daniel Anderson; Tim Hall; Bill Melendez
- Composers: Ed Bogas; Judy Munsen
- Country of origin: United States
- Original language: English

Production
- Executive producer: Lee Mendelson
- Producer: Bill Melendez
- Editors: Roger Donley; Chuck McCann
- Running time: 24 minutes
- Production companies: Lee Mendelson Film Productions; Bill Melendez Productions

Original release
- Network: CBS
- Release: March 19, 1979

Related
- What a Nightmare, Charlie Brown! (1978); She's a Good Skate, Charlie Brown (1980)

You're the Greatest, Charlie Brown is the 18th prime-time animated TV special based upon the comic strip Peanuts, by Charles M. Schulz. It originally aired on the CBS network on March 19, 1979, making it the last Peanuts TV special of the 1970s.

== Plot ==
In 1980, Charlie Brown decides to enter the Junior Olympics at his school after it is revealed he and his family are not going on vacation after all (even though he thought he would). The decathlon is the only thing left open, and Charlie Brown accepts the challenge (of course after everyone else there refused to take on such a tough event before Charlie Brown showed up).

Peppermint Patty, who is the school's coordinator for the Junior Olympics, oversees Charlie Brown's rigorous training for the event. Marcie also watches (and gives encouragement), and Snoopy works out with him (showing how in-shape he is and how out of shape Charlie Brown is in the process). During a review of the ten events, Peppermint Patty worries about whether or not he could win and decides to enter Marcie to back him up.

On day one, Charlie Brown is introduced to his competitors: Marcie, Freddie Fabulous from Fremont, the defending Decathlon champ and smug egotist, and Snoopy's alter ego from Ace Obedience School, The Masked Marvel. He places well in the first five events, enough to place him in third after the day is over. Lucy states she is annoyed that Charlie Brown cannot be a total blockhead by his third-place ranking, as the Masked Marvel came in dead last (even after winning the final event of the first day, the 400m dash).

Day two starts off rough for Charlie Brown. First, he feels nervous due to the increased pressure, then he performs poorly in the 110m high hurdles, knocking down all but one hurdle and finishing last by a mile. However, after a tough talk from Peppermint Patty, a great showing in the pole vault and first-place finishes in the discus and javelin throw get him to first place. The 1500m run was the last event and be the school's hero. When Charlie Brown gains the lead over Freddie Fabulous, Lucy is aghast that the world must be ending since Charlie Brown is coming in first. Unfortunately, after taking the lead, Charlie Brown closes his eyes and daydreams of his victory and winds up running off the track, off the school grounds, and out of contention, much to Peppermint Patty's shock.

It is learned afterward that their school still won the Junior Olympics, due to Marcie winning the 1500m (and thus the decathlon) after Freddie Fabulous and The Masked Marvel got into a tangle in the last ten yards. Peppermint Patty consoles Charlie Brown, telling him that everybody knows he did his best. Marcie arrives and Charlie Brown congratulates her on the win. Marcie, in turn, replies, "You're a great competitor and a real gentleman. I think you're the greatest, Charles." Uncharacteristically, she then lifts her glasses and winks at Charlie Brown, who blushes.

== Voice cast ==
- Arrin Skelley as Charlie Brown
- Michelle Muller as Lucy van Pelt
- Bill Melendez as Snoopy, Woodstock
- Patricia Patts as Peppermint Patty
- Casey Carlson as Marcie
- Daniel Anderson as Linus van Pelt
- Tim Hall as Freddie Fabulous
- Scott Beach as Announcer

Note: Sally Brown appears, but has no speaking lines. Schroeder, Pig-Pen, and "5" also appear and have one line, but their voices are unknown.

== Home media ==
It was released to DVD on January 27, 2009, by Warner Home Video as a bonus feature to You're a Good Sport, Charlie Brown. It appeared in remastered form in the Peanuts 1970s Collection Vol. 2 on June 1, 2010. Before that, the special was released on CED in 1981, and on VHS by Media Home Entertainment in 1984, Hi-Tops Video in 1988, and by Paramount Home Media Distribution on March 9, 1994. The special occasionally saw airings on American TV channel Nickelodeon from 1998 to 2000 as part of Nickelodeon's umbrella branding for Peanuts programming, You're on Nickelodeon, Charlie Brown!.

On October 7, 2025, it was released on the DVD and Blu-Ray collection Peanuts: 75th Anniversary Ultimate TV Specials Collection along with 39 other Peanuts specials.
