= What Have We Learned, Charlie Brown? =

1983 animated TV special

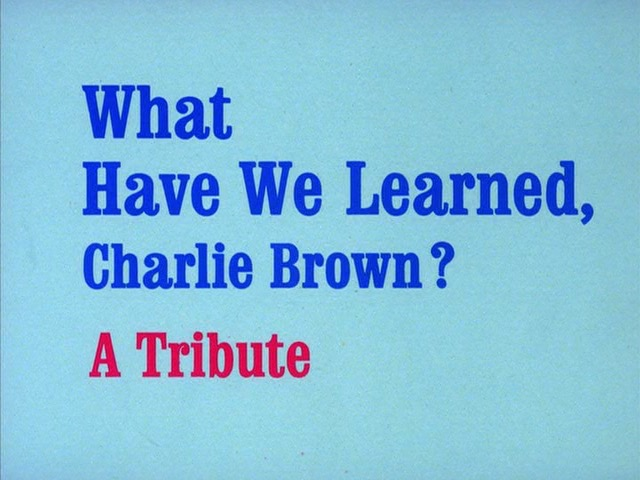
- Also known as: What Have We Learned, Charlie Brown? A Tribute
- Genre: Animation
- Based on: Peanuts by Charles M. Schulz
- Written by: Charles M. Schulz
- Directed by: Bill Melendez
- Voices of: Brad Kesten; Victoria Vargas; Jeremy Schoenberg; Stacy Heather Tolkin; Michael Dockery; Monica Parker; Bill Melendez
- Music by: Judy Munsen
- Country of origin: United States
- Original language: English

Production
- Producers: Lee Mendelson; Bill Melendez
- Editors: Chuck McCann; Roger Donley
- Running time: 24 minutes
- Production companies: Bill Melendez Productions; Lee Mendelson Film Productions

Original release
- Network: CBS
- Release: May 30, 1983

Related
- Bon Voyage, Charlie Brown (and Don't Come Back!!) (1980); It's an Adventure, Charlie Brown (1983); It's Flashbeagle, Charlie Brown (1984)

What Have We Learned, Charlie Brown? A Tribute is the 26th prime-time animated television special based upon the comic strip Peanuts, by Charles M. Schulz, who introduced the special. It originally aired on the CBS network on May 30, 1983, Memorial Day in the United States, and one week prior to the 39th anniversary of the D-Day Invasion. It was rebroadcast on CBS on May 26, 1984 and again on May 29, 1989.

== Plot ==
The special opens with Charlie Brown at home and he takes a book from his shelf titled "My Trip". His younger sister, Sally, approaches and asks him what he's doing. Charlie Brown tells her that he's making a photo album with pictures he took in France when he, Linus, Peppermint Patty, Marcie, Snoopy, and Woodstock went there for a student exchange. Sally realizes that Charlie Brown never told her what happened after the fire in the chateau and how he got home, and asks if he learned anything. From there, it is shown in a flashback:

As they begin to head back from the chateau to the train station for the return trip to London (where they would return to America by plane), their problematic rented Citroën 2CV slows their progress, before breaking down entirely in a small French town. Renting another one from an elderly French lady (who immediately accepts their offer after realizing Snoopy is, in fact, a World War I Flying Ace) they soon become lost and camp at a nearby beach for the night. Linus, however, wakes up shortly before daybreak and walks along the beach, realizing they are at Omaha Beach.

Linus then tells of the battle of D-Day, leading the group to the nearby cemetery for all of the American soldiers. The voice of General Dwight D. Eisenhower is also heard, reminiscing about the experiences of the battle. Archival news footage is also used, in some cases with the characters inserted through rotoscoping.

While proceeding up north, they head towards Ypres, which Linus recognized as the site of a series of battles during World War I. They arrive at a field of red poppies, which grew throughout the wastelands of battles fought during the war, and which serves as a marker for the Ypres battle site. Linus then recites John McCrae's famous poem In Flanders Fields, after directing the group to the British field dressing station where McCrae was inspired to write the poem.

They come away realizing what the impact of the wars were, and how important the sacrifice of the soldiers was. Standing among the field of red poppies, Linus then turns and asks, "What have we learned, Charlie Brown?". The scene flashes back to Charlie Brown and Sally. She then tells him that he is pasting the pictures upside down.

== Voice cast ==
- Brad Kesten as Charlie Brown
- Jeremy Schoenberg as Linus van Pelt
- Stacy Heather Tolkin as Sally Brown
- Brent Hauer/Victoria Vargas as Peppermint Patty
- Michael Dockery as Marcie
- Monica Parker as French Lady
- Bill Melendez as Snoopy and Woodstock

== Production ==
The special directly follows the events of the 1980 theatrical feature film Bon Voyage, Charlie Brown (and Don't Come Back!!). Charlie Brown, Linus, Snoopy, Peppermint Patty, Marcie, and Woodstock are returning from their student exchange in France. The film was purposefully open-ended in case there could be other adventures among the characters prior to returning home.

Charles Schulz said about its development,

I kept thinking how interesting it would be if they should somehow get lost on this little trip and end up at Omaha Beach and envision the scenes of the famous D-Day Invasion of World War II. I even thought that they might pass through Belgium and we could show some landscapes affected by World War I, and how emotional it could be if one of the characters somehow could be made to recite the immortal poem, John McCrae's In Flanders Fields.

Schulz struggled with development of the story line until shortly after his open-heart surgery in 1981. While recuperating, he was able to finalize the concept with a common line that would tie everything together, "What Have We Learned, Charlie Brown?"

== Award ==
The special won a Peabody Award for "distinguished achievement and meritorious public service" in broadcasting. Schulz would later say of the acclaim,

The Peabody award we received for What Have We Learned, Charlie Brown? was a very gratifying response to the program, plus many wonderful letters from appreciative young viewers who said that they now understood what happened on June 6, 1944. We labeled this show with the subtitle A Tribute, because that was exactly what we wanted it to be: no more and no less. It proved also that the characters of Charlie Brown, Linus, Snoopy and the others were close enough to being real to handle delicately a subject that other animated characters would destroy.

== Home media ==
The special was released on VHS by Kartes Video Communications in 1987 and again by Paramount on June 25, 1996. The special is available for purchase on iTunes together with You're Not Elected, Charlie Brown and He's a Bully, Charlie Brown, and is now available on DVD in the Peanuts Emmy Honored Collection. On October 7, 2025, it was released on the DVD and Blu-Ray collection Peanuts: 75th Anniversary Ultimate TV Specials Collection along with 39 other Peanuts specials.
