= Why, Charlie Brown, Why? =

1990 animated television special

- Genre: Animated television special Comedy-drama; Family
- Created by: Charles M. Schulz
- Written by: Charles M. Schulz
- Directed by: Sam Jaimes
- Voices of: Kaleb Henley; Brandon Stewart; Adrienne Stiefel; Jennifer Banko; Olivia Burnette; Bill Melendez; Lindsay Sloane; Brittany M. Thornton; Dion Zamora
- Composer: Judy Munsen
- Country of origin: United States

Production
- Executive producer: Lee Mendelson
- Producer: Bill Melendez
- Camera setup: Nick Vasu
- Running time: 23 minutes
- Production companies: Lee Mendelson Film Productions; Bill Melendez Productions

Original release
- Network: CBS
- Release: March 16, 1990

Related
- You Don't Look 40, Charlie Brown (1990); Snoopy's Reunion (1991)

Why, Charlie Brown, Why? is a 1990 American animated television special, and the 33rd prime-time animated TV special based upon the comic strip Peanuts by Charles M. Schulz. It originally aired on March 16, 1990, and was also nominated for an Emmy.

== Plot ==
At the beginning of the special, Charlie Brown, Linus, Sally, and a girl named Janice Emmons — a new friend and classmate of Charlie Brown and Linus — are seen waiting for the school bus. It's heavily implied that Linus is in love with Janice. While getting on the bus, Janice accidentally hits her arm on the bus railing, causing it to bruise. Linus notices that Janice bruises easily, and she mentions that she never used to. When they arrive at school, Janice starts feeling so ill that she has to go home sick. Three days later, her classmates discover that she is in the hospital.

After school, Linus and Charlie Brown decide to visit Janice in the hospital, where she tells them that she has leukemia. Charlie Brown asks if Janice is going to die, which upsets Linus for a moment, but Janice assures them otherwise. She explains what tests the doctors did to discover that she had leukemia and explains that while some of the tests were painful, not all of them were. She then shows them her IV line and explains her chemotherapy. Janice expresses her determination to recover from her illness, vowing to return to school someday. The news of his friend's illness hits Linus especially hard, and when he and Charlie Brown leave the hospital, Linus turns to him and asks, "Why, Charlie Brown, why?" before then going home, feeling disgruntled about what happened to Janice.

Once at home, Linus tells his sister Lucy about Janice's illness. Lucy at first does not seem to care, but when Linus mentions that he touched Janice's forehead when she felt ill at school, Lucy is immediately worried that Janice's illness might be contagious. Linus explains that leukemia is not contagious, but Lucy refuses to change her ignorant attitude towards Janice's condition. She demands that Linus take back the glass of milk he handed her earlier, fearing that he might be transmitting the illness. Linus gets back at Lucy by refusing to accept, so as not to get her "crabbiness".

Sometime later, Janice comes back to school, wearing a cap to cover her bald head, as she has lost her hair to the chemotherapy. This attracts the attention of a schoolyard bully, who makes fun of Janice's baldness until an enraged Linus explains that she has leukemia and asks the other boy if he would like to go through what she has gone through. The bully quickly softens and apologizes.

As Christmas approaches, Linus goes to Janice's house to give her a present, but her sisters inform Linus that she is at the hospital again, receiving treatment. One of the sisters complains about the attention Janice has been receiving, but later admits she and her other sister feel excluded due to Janice's illness. Linus gives her the present and leaves.

By the beginning of spring, Janice returns from the hospital and tells Linus she has a surprise for him, and she reveals the surprise at the end of the special while playing on the swings: her long blonde hair has grown back even longer than it was before, marking the end of her chemotherapy and her apparent recovery and presumed remission from the illness. As the credits roll, her cap falls to the ground, and Janice laughs one last time.

== Hymn ==
This special also included a brief rendition of the hymn "Farther Along", sung by Becky Reardon. The song played in the background as an angry Linus tries to make sense of Janice's illness.

== Cast ==
- Brandon Stewart as Linus Van Pelt
- Kaleb Henley as Charlie Brown
- Olivia Burnette as Janice Emmons
- Adrienne Stiefel as Sally Brown
- Jennifer Banko as Lucy Van Pelt
- Dion Zamora as schoolyard bully
- Brittany M. Thornton as Janice's curly-haired sister
- Lindsay Sloane as Janice's red-haired sister
- Bill Melendez as Snoopy and Woodstock

Peppermint Patty, Schroeder, Marcie, Franklin, Violet, and Shermy make cameo appearances.

== Production and reception ==
The idea for Why, Charlie Brown, Why? was conceived by Sylvia Cook, a registered nurse at the Stanford Children's Hospital. In December 1985, Cook sent a letter to Charles M. Schulz, asking him to produce a short animated film about cancer for young patients featuring the Peanuts characters. Schulz was initially doubtful because of the anticipated high production costs. Eventually, Cook received input from the American Cancer Society, which convinced Schulz to produce, rather than just a five-minute film, a half-hour special about the subject. Producer Bill Melendez and CBS initially balked at this idea, but eventually agreed to do it because of Schulz's enthusiasm for the project. The script of the special was completely written by Schulz, with Cook and the American Cancer Society serving as consultants.

The special has been shown in hospitals and in public education systems, primarily elementary schools and junior high schools, as a method for explaining the subject to children, and is also a part of the Pennies for Patients fundraiser campaign organized by The Leukemia & Lymphoma Society. The special has rarely aired on US television since its original premiere; Disney Channel has re-aired it while Nickelodeon and ABC, which at different points have withheld the rights to the Peanuts specials, have not. It has been seen on Boomerang in some European countries. The special is also streaming on Apple TV+, remastered to high definition.

A book adaptation of the special, titled Why, Charlie Brown, Why? A Story About What Happens When a Friend is Very Ill, was published by Pharos Books some weeks before the special's premiere on CBS, and was reissued in 2002. The original printing featured a foreword by actor Paul Newman.

Critical reaction to the special was overwhelmingly positive, with reviewers praising it for its realism, emotional weight, and poignancy, and for Janice's bravery in facing her disease.

The first airing of this special brought in an 8.7 household rating and a 16 percent audience share, ranking 65th out of 86 shows that week, and was watched by 15 million viewers.

== Nominations ==
Why, Charlie Brown, Why? was nominated for the Emmy for an Outstanding Animated Program (For Programming One Hour or Less) and the Humanitas Prize.

== Home Media ==
Why, Charlie Brown, Why? was first released on VHS in 1991, in the United Kingdom. It was followed by an American and Canadian release on August 1, 1995. The special was included as bonus feature on a 1995 LaserDisc release of You're a Good Man, Charlie Brown.

Why, Charlie Brown, Why? made its DVD debut on September 15, 2015, as part of the Peanuts EMMY Honored Collection. The special was remastered for this release.

On October 7, 2025, it was re-released on the DVD and Blu-Ray collection Peanuts: 75th Anniversary Ultimate TV Specials Collection along with 39 other Peanuts specials.
