= Morville-sur-Andelle =

- Part of Morville-le-Héron
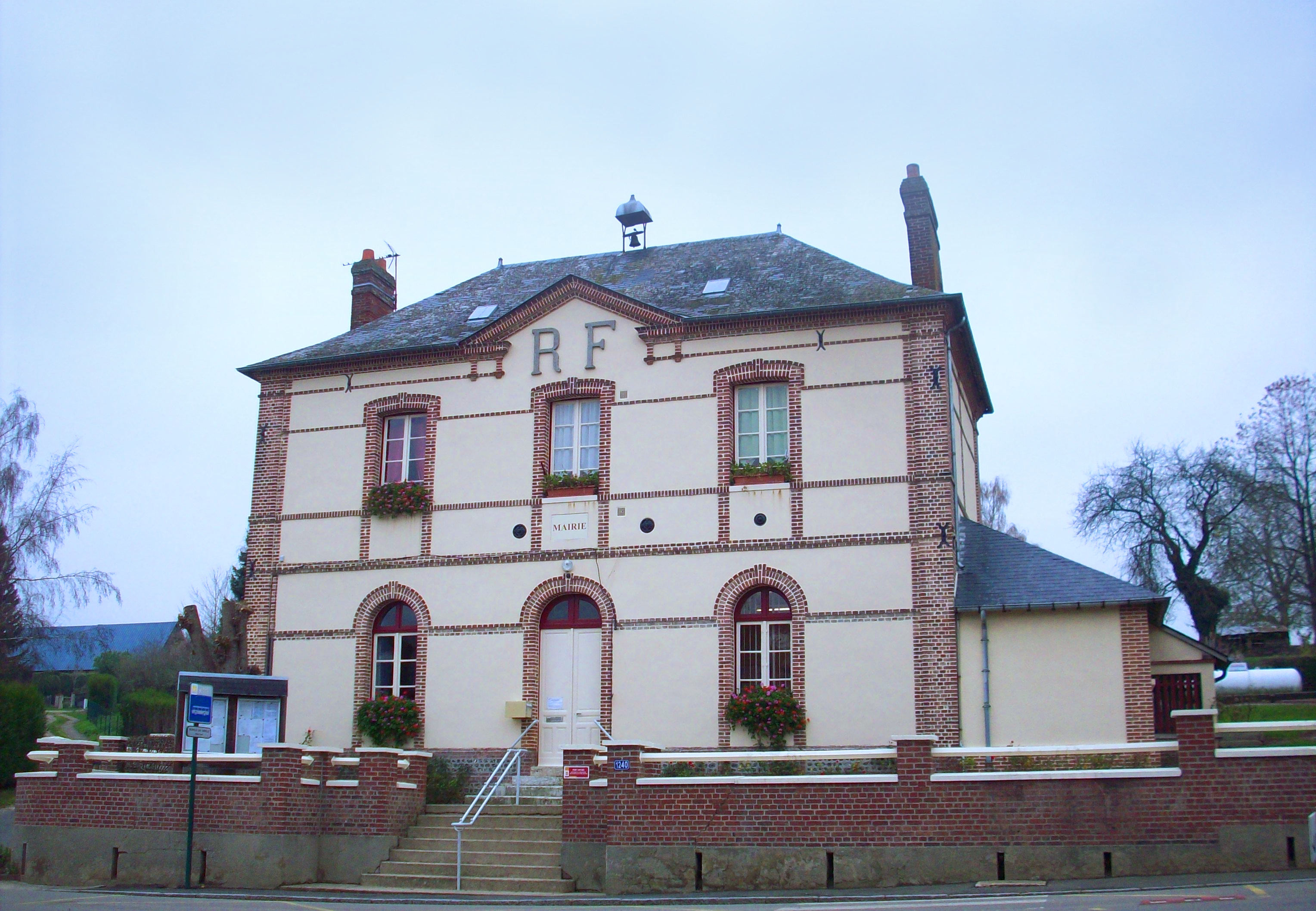
- The town hall in Morville-sur-Andelle
- Location of Morville-sur-Andelle
- Location within France Location within Normandy
- Coordinates: 49°28′40″N 1°25′56″E
- Country: France
- Region: Normandy
- Department: Seine-Maritime
- Arrondissement: Dieppe
- Canton: Gournay-en-Bray
- Commune: Morville-le-Héron
- Area^{1}: 5.17 km^{2} (2.00 sq mi)
- Elevation: 80 m (260 ft)
- Highest elevation: 175 m (574 ft)
- Lowest elevation: 65 m (213 ft)
- Population (2022): 293
  - Density: 56.7/km^{2} (147/sq mi)
- Time zone: UTC+01:00 (CET)
  - Summer (DST): UTC+02:00 (CEST)
- Postal code: 76780
- ^{1} French Land Register data, which excludes lakes, ponds, glaciers > 1 km^{2} (0.386 sq mi or 247 acres) and river estuaries.

Morville-sur-Andelle is a former commune in the Seine-Maritime department in the Normandy region in northern France. On 1 January 2025, it was merged into the new commune of Morville-le-Héron.

== Geography ==
The commune of Morville-sur-Andelle is centred on a small farming village situated by the banks of the river Andelle in the Pays de Bray, some 15 miles (24 km) east of Rouen at the junction of the D62 and the D238 roads.

== Population ==
Historical population
Year	Pop.	±% p.a.
1968	173	—
1975	177	+0.33%
1982	190	+1.02%
1990	173	−1.16%
1999	223	+2.86%
2007	278	+2.79%
2012	287	+0.64%
2017	345	+3.75%
Source: INSEE

== Places of interest ==
- The church of Saint-Ouen is 18th century with vestiges from the 13th century in the tower. The bronze bell dates from 1657.
- Moulin (mill) de l'Andelle, situated at Imberville, built in 1839.

== See also ==
- Communes of the Seine-Maritime department
