= She's a Good Skate, Charlie Brown =

1980 animated television special

- Genre: Animated television special
- Based on: Peanuts by Charles M. Schulz
- Directed by: Phil Roman
- Voices of: Patricia Patts; Casey Carlson; Bill Melendez; Jason Victor Serinus; Arrin Skelley; Debbie Muller; Scott Beach; Daniel Anderson; Laura Planting
- Music by: Ed Bogas; Judy Munsen
- Country of origin: United States
- Original language: English

Production
- Executive producer: Lee Mendelson
- Producer: Bill Melendez
- Cinematography: Nick Vasu
- Editors: Roger Donley; Chuck McCann
- Running time: 24 minutes
- Production companies: Lee Mendelson Film Productions; Bill Melendez Productions; United Media Productions

Original release
- Network: CBS
- Release: February 25, 1980

Related
- You're the Greatest, Charlie Brown (1979); Life Is a Circus, Charlie Brown (1980)

She's a Good Skate, Charlie Brown is the 19th prime-time animated television special based on the comic strip Peanuts by Charles M. Schulz and a spin off around Peppermint Patty and Marcie. It originally aired on the CBS network on February 25, 1980, making it the first Peanuts special of the 1980s. It is also one of the few Peanuts animated specials to feature clear and intelligible adult voices. From 2010-2019, ABC had the rights to air this special, which it paired with Happy New Year, Charlie Brown!

== Plot ==
Peppermint Patty is practicing figure skating with her coach Snoopy for an upcoming competition, but the many days of getting up to practice at 4:30 A.M. are starting to take their toll, and she falls asleep constantly in class. One of her practices is halted briefly when a group of ten ice hockey players threatens her if she does not leave the ice so they can play. Peppermint Patty and Snoopy take care of the situation by shoving the lead ice hockey players on each squad, causing both teams of ice hockey players to fall on top of each other like dominoes and be swept off the ice by Snoopy.

Later that day after an afternoon practice, Marcie, who is observing, invites Peppermint Patty over to her house for hot cocoa and cookies. Once there, Peppermint Patty notices that Marcie has a sewing machine. Despite Marcie explaining that it is her mother's machine, and that she does not know how to sew, Peppermint Patty commissions her to make a dress for the competition. With that settled, they head to a fabric store and buy the supplies. As expected, the dress does not come out good on Marcie's part, looking more like a sleeveless poncho, to which Marcie defends her mistake by reminding her that she told her she did not know how to sew, and that the homespun outfit was Peppermint Patty's idea, not hers. Peppermint Patty heads back outside and almost tearfully shows Snoopy the mangled dress. He leads her back to Marcie's and, taking the dress from Peppermint Patty, returns to the sewing machine and almost instantly sews the dress into a top-notch skating outfit.

However, Snoopy is less helpful when Peppermint Patty complains that her hair is a "mousey blah" style. Snoopy brings in a large red gift box, and inside is a large red curly-haired wig that makes Peppermint Patty look like Little Orphan Annie. After trying it on, Peppermint Patty rolls her eyes and dumps the wig on Snoopy's head.

The day of the competition has arrived. All the contestants are first practicing altogether, then they clear while Snoopy clears the ice. The first two contestants end up falling and get rather low scores. The third contestant does not fall, and gets such a good score that the pressure is on for Peppermint Patty. Unfortunately, disaster seems to strike as her music tape goes haywire in the cassette deck. While Snoopy frantically tries to fix it and ends up in a fight with the machine on the ice, Peppermint Patty is starting to sweat as she holds her opening pose longer than she expected, and all the rest of the Peanuts characters in the audience worry that she will be disqualified. However, disaster is averted when Woodstock steps up to the microphone and whistles the music "O mio babbino caro".

Peppermint Patty receives the highest score, and has won the competition. She is shown on the stand with her trophy, while the runners-up stand below her with silver and bronze medals. On the way out, she is talking with Snoopy about her performance, and Snoopy is back as his grumbling, coaching self. She finally asks if he has anything nice to say, and she gets kissed on the cheek by him, much to her delight. Woodstock is shown bringing up the rear whistling the music again.

== Figure skating animation ==
The skating portrayed in the film is quite accurate for the time. Peppermint Patty is seen practicing compulsory figures and her free skating routine uses realistic figure skating jumps, spins, and choreography. The skating scenes were animated using the rotoscoping technique, using Schulz's own daughter (credited as Amy Schulz) as one of the models. Some of the skating footage appears in the concluding animation associated with the credits.

== Original strips ==
This program was written from a relatively long series of Peanuts comic strips originally published in 1974. The strip had other subplots that were left out of the special, and changes were made to the storyline for the special:

- In the strip, after the disaster with Patty's skating dress, Marcie's mother stepped in to make the alterations. It was Snoopy who altered the dress in the TV special.
- After Patty gets her dress she wants to do something with her self-described "mousy-blah" hair, so she ultimately decides to go to Charlie Brown's dad's barber shop, but Charlie Brown forgot to tell his dad she was a girl (added to which Peppermint Patty told Charlie Brown's dad that she could strike him out in three pitches), so he gives her a boy's haircut, much to her despair. To cover up the mistake, Patty wears an afro wig several sizes too big. This scene is altered in the special, with the wig a gift from Snoopy and promptly refused.
- Patty arrives at the competition and only at that point finds out that it is for roller skating, not ice skating, but not before she gets into trouble inadvertently damaging the rink floor with her skate blades. Patty returns from the competition realizing she still owes Snoopy for her lessons. Having no money, she gives him her wig as payment.

== Voice cast ==
- Patricia Patts as Peppermint Patty
- Casey Carlson as Marcie
- Bill Melendez as Snoopy
- Jason Serinus as Woodstock (whistling)
- Debbie Muller as Teacher, shopkeeper
- Scott Beach as Announcer
- Arrin Skelley as Charlie Brown
- Daniel Anderson as Linus van Pelt
- Laura Planting as Lucy van Pelt

== Skaters ==
- Mary Ellen Kinsey (as Mary Kinsey)
- Karen Hutton
- Amy Schulz

== Home media ==
On September 6, 1995, Paramount Home Video released the special on a double-feature VHS with Play It Again, Charlie Brown. Warner Home Video released it on October 18, 2011, under a single-disc DVD Happiness Is...Peanuts: Snow Days. It was also released by Hi-Tops Video in 1988, and previously released in 1985 by Media Home Entertainment with It's Flashbeagle, Charlie Brown. This special was re-released as part of the DVD box set Snoopy's Holiday Collection on October 1, 2013.

On October 7, 2025, it was released on the DVD and Blu-Ray collection Peanuts: 75th Anniversary Ultimate TV Specials Collection along with 39 other Peanuts specials.
