= It's an Adventure, Charlie Brown =

1983 television special

- Genre: Animated television special
- Created by: Charles M. Schulz
- Written by: Charles M. Schulz
- Directed by: Bill Melendez
- Voices of: Michael Catalano; Angela Lee; Earl Reilly; Cindi Reilly; Brent Hauer; Michael Dockery; Brad Schacter; Brian Jackson; Jason Castellano; Gerard Goyette Jr. Jenny Lewis; Johnny Graves; Joel Graves; Jason Muller; John Hiestand; Bill Melendez
- Composers: Ed Bogas; Desiree Goyette
- Country of origin: United States
- Original language: English

Production
- Producers: Lee Mendelson; Bill Melendez
- Editors: Chuck McCann; Roger Donley
- Running time: 48 minutes
- Production companies: Bill Melendez Productions; Lee Mendelson Film Productions; United Media Productions

Original release
- Network: CBS
- Release: May 16, 1983

Related
- Is This Goodbye, Charlie Brown? (1983); What Have We Learned, Charlie Brown? (1983)

It's an Adventure, Charlie Brown is the 25th prime-time animated television special based upon the comic strip Peanuts, by Charles M. Schulz. It was originally aired on the CBS network on May 16, 1983. It, along with 1982's A Charlie Brown Celebration, inspired the Saturday Morning series The Charlie Brown and Snoopy Show.

== Format ==
The special is a compilation consisting of eight individual stories adapted from the stories in the comic strip:

- Sack: Adapted from a June 11 to July 5, 1973 comic strip storyline, Charlie Brown is having hallucinations as a result of a rash on the back of his head resembling the stitchings of a baseball, most notably seeing the rising sun as a baseball. After consulting with his doctor, he goes to camp in an attempt to get over his hallucinations. To hide his rash, he puts a paper bag over his head. Charlie Brown's fellow campers begin calling him "Sack" and elect him as camp president, constantly professing their respect and admiration for him. When he removes his sack the next morning, however, he becomes unpopular again. Charlie Brown watches the sun rise, fearing that it will appear as a rising baseball. Instead, the sun is replaced with the face of Alfred E. Neuman, the mascot of Mad Magazine.
- Caddies: Peppermint Patty and Marcie become golf caddies. They are forced to deal with an obnoxious supervisor and a pair of female golfers whose bickering degenerates into violence. Fed up with their duties, they quit the job, but not before making $1.
- Kite: Charlie Brown, sick of the Kite Eating Tree, bites it as retaliation for eating his kites. Shortly after, he receives a letter from the Environmental Protection Agency threatening action against him. To evade the EPA, Charlie Brown runs away from home. He wanders into a strange neighborhood and accepts a job offer to coach a younger baseball team, even though this requires that he sleep in a cardboard box at night. Charlie Brown gains the respect and admiration of his players despite their incompetence. He discovers that his new team's first game is against his old team. Charlie Brown's old teammates inform him that he can come home, as the Kite Eating Tree was blown over in a storm, thus clearing his name.
- Song: Lucy comes to Schroeder's house, annoying him while he tries to play many pieces.
- Sally: Sally tells jokes in class. (This story was added as part of The Charlie Brown and Snoopy Show.)
- Butterfly: Peppermint Patty falls asleep with a butterfly resting on her nose, and Marcie fools her into believing it turned into an angel. Peppermint Patty attempts to contact religious leaders to share her story but is unsuccessful.
- Blanket: Lucy attempts to get rid of Linus' blanket twice: first by burying it and later by turning it into a kite and letting it go. When separated from his blanket, Linus has a panic attack and is desperate to find it. Thankfully, Snoopy goes to great lengths to get his blanket back for him both times. (Scenes from this story were recreated in Happiness is a Warm Blanket, Charlie Brown)
- Woodstock: Woodstock performs many of his antics in front of Snoopy, who is taking an afternoon nap. (This story was added as part of The Charlie Brown and Snoopy Show.)

== Voice cast ==
- Michael Catalano as Charlie Brown
- Angela Lee as Lucy van Pelt
- Earl "Rocky" Reilly as Linus van Pelt
- Cindi Reilly as Sally Brown
- Brent Hauer as Peppermint Patty
- Michael Dockery as Marcie
- Brad Schacter as Schroeder
- Brian Jackson as Camp Kids
- Jason Castellano as Camp Kids
- Gerard Goyette Jr. as Caddie Master
- Jenny Lewis as Ruby
- Johnny Graves as Austin
- Joel Graves as Leland
- Jason Muller as Milo
- John Hiestand as Joe Mouth
- Bill Melendez as Snoopy and Woodstock

== Home media ==
It was first released on VHS by Hi-Tops Video in 1987. On October 7, 2025, it was released on the DVD and Blu-Ray collection Peanuts: 75th Anniversary Ultimate TV Specials Collection along with 39 other Peanuts specials.
