= Someday You'll Find Her, Charlie Brown =

1981 television special directed by Phil Roman

- Genre: Animated television special
- Based on: Peanuts by Charles M. Schulz
- Written by: Charles M. Schulz
- Directed by: Phil Roman
- Voices of: Grant Wehr; Earl Reilly; Nicole Eggert; Jennifer Gaffin; Melissa Strawmeyer; Bill Melendez
- Music by: Ed Bogas; Judy Munsen
- Country of origin: United States
- Original language: English

Production
- Executive producer: Lee Mendelson
- Producer: Bill Melendez
- Running time: 24 minutes
- Production company: Lee Mendelson-Bill Melendez Productions

Original release
- Network: CBS
- Release: October 30, 1981

Related
- It's Magic, Charlie Brown (1981); A Charlie Brown Celebration (1982)

Someday You'll Find Her, Charlie Brown is the 22nd prime-time animated television special based upon the comic strip Peanuts, by Charles M. Schulz. It originally aired on the CBS network on October 30, 1981.

The special was directed by Phil Roman. This is the only time Charlie Brown was voiced by Grant Wehr and is Wehr's only acting credit. Michael Mandy returned as Charlie Brown's voice for the final time in A Charlie Brown Celebration.

== Plot ==
Charlie Brown is watching a football game on television when he spots a girl in the stands whom he falls in love with. He is then crushed when the game ends, and he feels he may never see her again. Determined to not lose his true love, he enlists Linus to help him find her.

The pair return to the football stadium to try to locate where she was sitting. Charlie Brown remembers she was sitting next to tunnel #13, because that's his lucky number. He has Linus sit where he determined she was sitting to recreate the shot in his head. Charlie Brown and Linus try asking someone in the ticket booth to find out who she is, but no one knows. Someone there suggests they check the season ticket records downtown, and that is where they go. They encounter two girls during the search, but neither are the one they seek.

Finally, they make their way to the Happy Valley Farm, where the third girl lives. Snoopy and Woodstock are already there, and after Snoopy has some major problems getting across the cattle guard at the intersection of the main driveway, he and Woodstock encounter a rather mean bobcat named Brutus who chases them back across those rollers (where Snoopy has problems again), where they finally meet up with Charlie Brown and Linus. Charlie Brown unwisely dismisses Snoopy's attempts to warn him of Brutus, and he and Linus walk in past the cat, petting him as they pass. Soon they too are chased by Brutus.

Linus learns on the phone of another entrance and is warned that Brutus is actually very sweet but does not like strangers very much. They finally get to the house, where Linus encounters the correct girl, but completely forgets about Charlie Brown and falls for her instead as she carries a security blanket similar to his. She reciprocates his feelings. Linus enters her home, leaving Charlie Brown alone. Charlie Brown, after being chased from the yard by Brutus, decides to wait for hours.

When Linus returns, he talks about how special she is and how they've decided to spend some time together. He is completely oblivious to Charlie Brown's exasperation. A depressed Charlie Brown returns home. The next day, he meets with Linus at the brick wall, who then leaves, as he has been invited to the farm for a family barbecue. After he leaves, Charlie Brown flips through a book of quotes on love, which he carries with him. However, rather than inspiring him, the sayings he reads only depress him further.

== Voice cast ==
- Grant Wehr as Charlie Brown
- Earl Reilly as Linus Van Pelt
- Bill Melendez as Snoopy and Woodstock
- Nicole Eggert as First girl
- Jennifer Gaffin as Mary Jo
- Melissa Strawmeyer as Teenager
- Jackson Beck as Brutus (uncredited)

== Home media ==
Someday You'll Find Her, Charlie Brown was released to DVD by Paramount Home Media Distribution on January 6, 2004, as a bonus feature with the special A Charlie Brown Valentine, and re-released in the same manner by Warner Home Video on December 28, 2010.

Before that, it was released on VHS by Media Home Entertainment on February 14, 1985 and Hi-Tops Video in 1989, and as part of a double feature with the special There's No Time for Love, Charlie Brown on both VHS and LaserDisc by Paramount on January 11, 1995.

On October 7, 2025, it was released on the DVD and Blu-Ray collection Peanuts: 75th Anniversary Ultimate TV Specials Collection along with 39 other Peanuts specials.

== Critical reception ==
The special was nominated for Outstanding Individual Achievement - Animated Programming and Outstanding Animated Program at the 34th Primetime Emmy Awards but did not win either category.

Mick Martin and Marsha Porter's Video Movie Guide gave this TV special two out of five stars as they described it as a "lamentable tale" and blamed the film's character Mary Jo for substituting the Little Red-Haired Girl as Charlie Brown's crush.
