= It's Magic, Charlie Brown =

1981 television special

- Genre: Animated TV Special
- Based on: Peanuts by Charles M. Schulz
- Written by: Charles M. Schulz
- Directed by: Phil Roman
- Voices of: Sydney Penny; Cindi Reilly; Earl Reilly; Bill Melendez; Michael Mandy; Shannon Cohn; Brent Hauer; Casey Carlson
- Music by: Ed Bogas; Judy Munsen
- Country of origin: United States
- Original language: English

Production
- Executive producer: Lee Mendelson
- Producer: Bill Melendez
- Running time: 24 minutes
- Production companies: Lee Mendelson Film Productions; Bill Melendez Productions; United Media Productions

Original release
- Network: CBS
- Release: April 28, 1981

Related
- Life Is a Circus, Charlie Brown (1980); Someday You'll Find Her, Charlie Brown (1981)

It's Magic, Charlie Brown is the 21st prime-time animated television special based upon the comic strip Peanuts, by Charles M. Schulz. It originally aired on April 28, 1981.

== Plot ==
Charlie Brown decides that Snoopy needs to educate himself, and gives him his library card to check out a few books. Snoopy takes out a book about magic and performs a magic show as "The Great Houdini." He ends the show by making Charlie Brown disappear. A sudden rainstorm ends the show early, and Charlie Brown is left invisible. Snoopy tries several dumb ideas to make him visible again, instead of magic, including draping a sheet over him, which only scares Charlie Brown when he looks in the mirror and sees what he thinks is a ghost.

Charlie Brown realizes he has a golden opportunity to kick Lucy's football without her knowing. Charlie Brown finally succeeds in kicking the football four times and taunts her about it. Furious, Lucy gives Snoopy his magic book and threatens him into bringing back Charlie Brown.

Snoopy manages to bring Charlie Brown back after blindly shooting his invisibility counter spell in an attempt to find him. Charlie Brown turns back to normal while he attempts to kick Lucy's football again before she pulls it away at the last second. Regardless, Charlie Brown is happy that he finally kicked the football, although Lucy says no one will believe him. Charlie Brown says that Snoopy will believe him since he made it possible for him. When Lucy scoffs at Snoopy, the insulted beagle magically levitates Lucy into the sky, and leaves her stuck there as payback until Linus pulls her down with his blanket during the credits. After being brought down by Linus, a defeated and humiliated Lucy walks home.

== Cast ==
- Michael Mandy as Charlie Brown
- Sydney Penny as Lucy van Pelt
- Cindi Reilly as Sally Brown
- Earl Reilly as Linus van Pelt, Franklin
- Brent Hauer as Peppermint Patty
- Shannon Cohn and Casey Carlson as Marcie
- Christopher Donohone as Schroeder
- Bill Melendez as Snoopy, Woodstock

== Home media ==
It's Magic, Charlie Brown was released on DVD on September 2, 2008, as a bonus feature on Warner Home Video's remaster of It's the Great Pumpkin, Charlie Brown.

On October 7, 2025, it was released on the DVD and Blu-Ray collection Peanuts: 75th Anniversary Ultimate TV Specials Collection along with 39 other Peanuts specials.
