= Is This Goodbye, Charlie Brown? =

1983 US animated television film

- Genre: Animated television special
- Created by: Charles M. Schulz
- Written by: Charles M. Schulz
- Directed by: Phil Roman
- Voices of: Brad Kesten; Jeremy Schoenberg; Angela Lee; Stacy Heather Tolkin; Kevin Brando; Victoria Vargas; Michael Dockery; Bill Melendez
- Music by: Judy Munsen
- Country of origin: United States
- Original language: English

Production
- Executive producer: Charles M. Schulz
- Producers: Lee Mendelson; Bill Melendez
- Running time: 24 minutes
- Production companies: Bill Melendez Productions; Lee Mendelson Film Productions; Charles M. Schulz Creative Associates; United Media Productions

Original release
- Network: CBS
- Release: February 21, 1983

Related
- A Charlie Brown Celebration (1982); It's an Adventure, Charlie Brown (1983)

Is This Goodbye, Charlie Brown? is the 24th prime-time animated television special based upon the comic strip Peanuts, by Charles M. Schulz. It was originally aired on the CBS network on February 21, 1983. In the special, Charlie Brown tries to cope with learning that Linus and Lucy are moving away. The special is adapted from a storyline from the comic strip that lasted from May 9 to May 21, 1966.

== Plot ==
This special begins when Linus calls the Brown house and Sally picks up. She gets very excited that her so-called “Sweet Babboo” is on the other line. Upset at being called that, he tries to ask if Charlie Brown is home but Sally asks if he called to ask her to a movie. He furiously repeats that he wants to talk to her brother. However, she misinterprets that and tells him she will be waiting outside for him to pick her up, after which she gives the phone to Charlie Brown. Linus then tells Charlie that he will be over right away. When he arrives, he tells Charlie Brown they will have to move due to his father's job transfer, much to the former’s surprise and dismay.

Lucy then goes to Schroeder to tell him the same, and gives him a picture of her so he will always remember her. When asked "But what if I want to forget you and turn it around?", she reveals it to be double-sided.

Charlie Brown sadly watches the Van Pelts' belongings being loaded into a moving truck then goes to Lucy's psychiatry booth, where he tells her how miserable things will be without Linus. After angrily reminding him that she is also leaving, she introduces her replacement: Snoopy, who changes the booth’s cost on the sign from 5 cents to 50 cents (presumably more than Charlie Brown's allowance). Then Linus and Charlie Brown are shown playing their final baseball game together.

Later, Lucy walks over to the Brown house and finds Sally waiting out front, claiming she is waiting for Linus to take her to a movie. Lucy tries to break the news to her that her family is moving, including Linus, but Sally doesn't believe her.

Linus then invites Charlie Brown to his and Lucy's going away party. When asked if she wants to come, Sally insists that Linus is going to pick her up and take her to a movie later. The going away party is catered by Snoopy, who feeds everyone dog food with water causing everyone to leave disgusted.

The next day, Linus and Lucy say their last goodbyes to Charlie Brown. As they pull out, Linus throws Snoopy his security blanket as a way to remember him. After the van Pelts leave, Charlie Brown sadly walks home, where he finds Sally still waiting for Linus on the porch. When her brother tells her that Linus and his family have moved away, Sally walks inside in despondence. Then Schroeder comes by looking for Lucy, only for Charlie Brown to reveal that the Van Pelts have moved away (while also berating him for his hypocrisy: according to Charlie Brown, Schroeder never cared for Lucy), much to his shock. He claims he thought she was kidding, then grows upset that he never got to say goodbye. In a later scene, Schroeder is seen playing the piano with the musical staff above him, and Lucy’s head appears between the treble and bass staff. When he notices, he stops playing and breaks the fourth wall in a nod to the 1971 special Play It Again, Charlie Brown: "Don't tell me I've grown accustomed to that face.".

The next day, Charlie Brown tells Peppermint Patty that he is upset over Linus moving away. Convinced that he needs help, she enlists Marcie for some advice. When Marcie asks her if she likes him, she naturally denies it. She later walks home trying to convince herself that she couldn't love a loser like him.

That night while Peppermint Patty is trying to sleep, she imagines Charlie Brown is feeling bad about himself and decides to call him to make him feel better. When she does, Charlie Brown is so tired that he doesn't seem to be listening to what Peppermint Patty is saying. She invites him on a date to the movies, but makes it seem as if Charlie Brown is asking her instead. She says she wants to go with him to a movie, then hangs up and goes to sleep feeling good about herself. Charlie Brown suddenly wakes up shocked to himself near the phone, thinking he just dreamt he was talking to Peppermint Patty.

The next day, Peppermint Patty is waiting for Charlie Brown to pick her up for their date. Marcie visits him at the wall, noticing how tired he looks. He tells her that for some strange reason, he woke up at midnight by the phone after dreaming he spoke to Peppermint Patty. She realizes what is happening and tells Peppermint Patty that he's not coming, but she doesn't believe Marcie and continues to wait.

Later that day, Peppermint Patty calls Charlie Brown, upset that he didn't show up for their date. She continues to bother him but says she won't take revenge on him, and when they hang up he says, "I never know what's going on." Sally expects a phone call from Linus but Charlie Brown reminds her that Linus moved, and that even if he was still here he likely wouldn't be calling her. Charlie Brown then shows her a postcard from him which only reads about her: "Have you seen any good movies lately?"

Later, Charlie Brown notices moving trucks in front of the van Pelt house again. He looks to see what is going on and is excited to find Linus! He tells him his father didn't like his new job so they are moving back. Just then, Lucy gets out of the car decrying how their neighborhood still looks the same, to which Linus says, "Oh yeah. She's back too," before Snoopy throws Linus his security blanket back. The special ends after Lucy teases to Schroeder that she’s returned.

== Voice actors ==
- Brad Kesten as Charlie Brown
- Jeremy Schoenberg as Linus van Pelt
- Angela Lee as Lucy van Pelt
- Stacy Heather Tolkin as Sally Brown
- Bill Melendez as Snoopy and Woodstock
- Kevin Brando as Schroeder and Franklin
- Victoria Vargas as Peppermint Patty
- Michael Dockery as Marcie

Patty, Roy, Pig-Pen, Violet, and Shermy have silent roles.

== Home media ==
The special was released on VHS by Hi-Tops Video in 1987 and Paramount Home Video on June 25, 1996. It was released for the first time on DVD alongside Charlie Brown's Christmas Tales as a CVS Pharmacy Exclusive offer on November 3, 2009, and then solicited to the wider market in 2010. It was re-released as part of the box set Snoopy's Holiday Collection on October 1, 2013.

On October 7, 2025, it was released on the DVD and Blu-Ray collection Peanuts: 75th Anniversary Ultimate TV Specials Collection along with 39 other Peanuts specials.
