= List of animation awards =

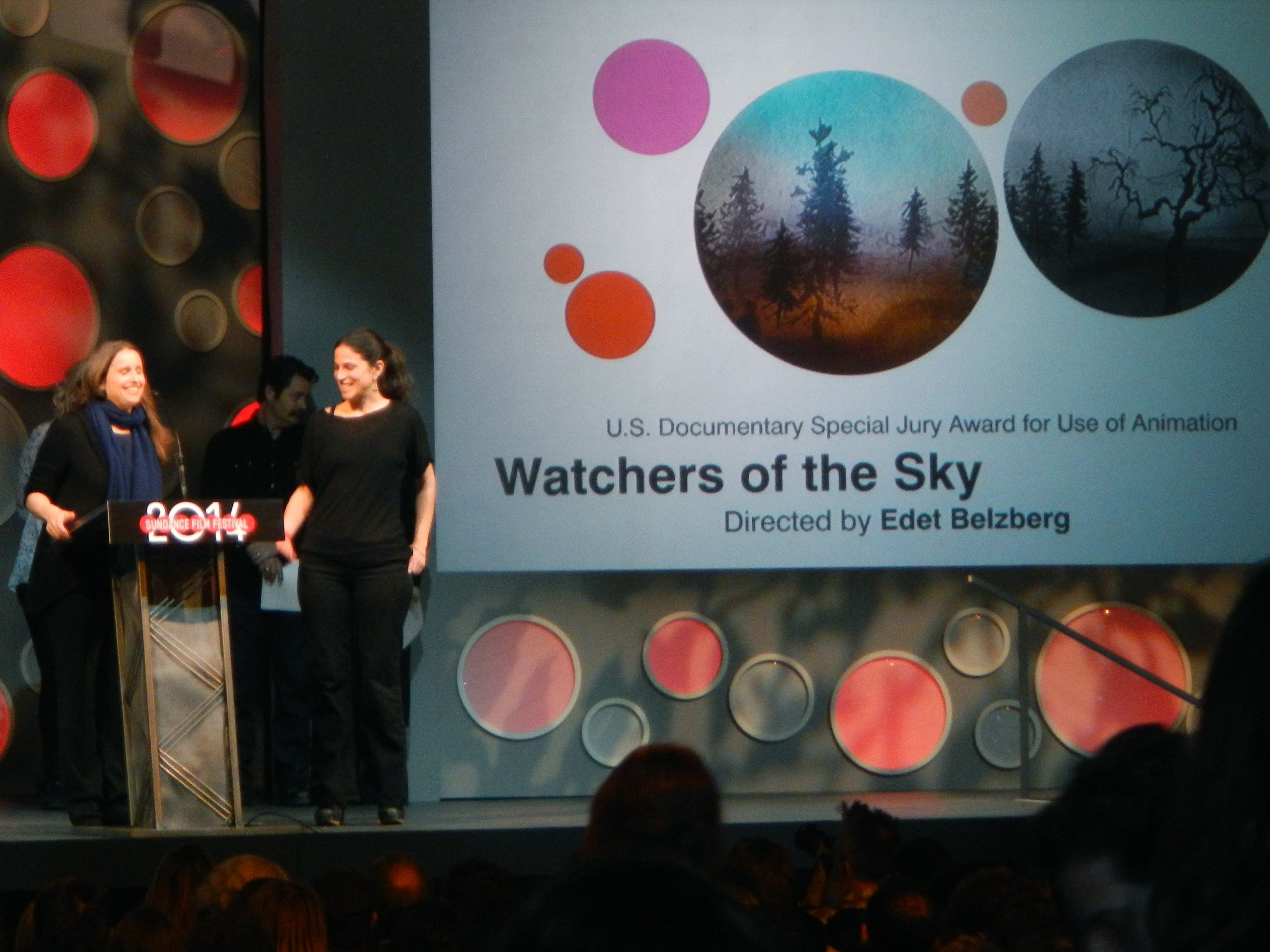
Watchers of the Sky Animation Award at the 2014 Sundance Film Festival

This list of animation awards is an index of articles about notable awards for animation. It excludes animated feature films awards, which are covered by a separate list. It includes a list of Japanese anime awards.

== General ==
Region	Award	Venue / sponsor	Notes
Asia-Pacific	Asia Pacific Screen Award for Best Animated Feature Film	UNESCO, FIAPF and Brisbane City Council, Australia	since 2007
Europe	European Film Award for Best Animated Film	European Film Academy	since 2009
Spain	Goya Award for Best Animated Film	Academy of Cinematographic Arts and Sciences of Spain (AACCE)	since 1989
United Kingdom	BAFTA Award for Best Animated Film	British Academy of Film and Television Arts	since 2006
India	National Film Award for Best Animated Film	Directorate of Film Festivals	since 2006
Australia	AACTA Award for Best Short Animation	Australian Academy of Cinema and Television Arts	Australian short animated film
United Kingdom	British Animation Awards	britishanimationawards.com	Many categories
United States	Academy Award for Best Animated Feature	Academy of Motion Picture Arts and Sciences	Feature length
United States	Academy Award for Best Animated Short Film	Academy of Motion Picture Arts and Sciences	Oscar
Nigeria	Africa Movie Academy Award for Best Animation	Africa Movie Academy Awards	Best animated films for the year, since 2008
Brazil	Anima Mundi	Ancine	
Croatia	Animafest Zagreb	International Animated Film Association	Various categories
Philippines	Animahenasyon	Animation Council of the Philippines	Works of veteran and novice Filipino animators
India	Ann Awards	AnimationXpress.com	Various categories
France	Annecy International Animated Film Festival	International Animated Film Association	
United States	Annie Awards	International Animated Film Association	
Canada	Canadian Screen Award for Best Animated Short	Academy of Canadian Cinema & Television	
Europe	Cartoon d'or	Cartoon d'or	Best European animated short film
France	César Award for Best Animated Short Film	Académie des Arts et Techniques du Cinéma	since 2011
United States	Critics' Choice Movie Award for Best Animated Feature	Critics Choice Association	
United States	Student Illustrator Award	Kevin Dang	
United States	Daytime Emmy Award for Outstanding Pre-School Children's Animated Program	Academy of Television Arts & Sciences	
United States	Detroit Film Critics Society Award for Best Animated Feature	Detroit Film Critics Society	
Europe	Emile Awards	European Animation Awards Academy	
India	Federation of Indian Chambers of Commerce and Industry (FICCI) Best Animated Frames (BAF) Awards	Federation of Indian Chambers of Commerce and Industry	Best Animated Film
India	Flying Elephant Competition	Toonz Animation India	Various Categories
United States	Golden Globe Award for Best Animated Feature Film	Hollywood Foreign Press Association	
China	Golden Rooster Award for Best Animation	Golden Rooster Awards	since 1981
Germany	Hamburg Animation Award	Hamburg Chamber of Commerce	
Ireland	Irish Animation Awards	Animation Ireland	
United States	June Foray Award	International Animated Film Association	Significant and benevolent or charitable impact on the art and industry of animation
Hungary	Kecskemét Animation Film Festival	Kecskemét Animation Film Festival	Various categories
United States	Los Angeles Film Critics Association Award for Best Animated Film	Los Angeles Film Critics Association	
Spain	Premios Quirino	Tenerife Film Commission	
United States	Primetime Emmy Award for Outstanding Animated Program	Academy of Television Arts & Sciences	
United States	Saturn Award for Best Animated Series on Television	Academy of Science Fiction, Fantasy and Horror Films	
United States	Saturn Award for Best Animated Film	Academy of Science Fiction, Fantasy and Horror Films	
United States	Primetime Emmy Award for Outstanding Individual Achievement in Animation	Academy of Television Arts & Sciences	
United States	Primetime Emmy Award for Outstanding Short Form Animated Program	Academy of Television Arts & Sciences	
Canada	Prix Iris for Best Animated Short Film	Québec Cinéma	
United States	Producers Guild of America Award for Best Animated Motion Picture	Producers Guild of America	
Canada	Spark Animation Awards	Spark Computer Graphics Society	Qualifying event for the Academy Awards and the Canadian Screen Awards honoring excellence in global and Canadian animated works such as short films, features, student works, commercials, music videos, game cinematics, and VFX pieces in various styles; since 2008
Netherlands	Suzanne Award	Blender Foundation	Animation using Blender (software)
United States	Teen Choice Award for Choice Animated Series	Teen Choice Awards	
United States	Visual Effects Society Award for Outstanding Visual Effects in an Animated Feature	Visual Effects Society	
United States	Winsor McCay Award	Annie Awards	
United States	Writers Guild of America Award for Television: Animation	Writers Guild of America	
United States	NAACP Image Award for Outstanding Animated Motion Picture	NAACP Image Awards	
United States	NAACP Image Award for Outstanding Short Form (Animated)	NAACP Image Awards	
United States	NAACP Image Award for Outstanding Animated Series	NAACP Image Awards	

== Anime awards ==
Country	Award	Venue / sponsor	Notes
United States	American Anime Awards	New York Comic Con	Excellence in the release of anime and manga in North America
Japan	Anime Grand Prix	Animage	Readers' votes decide Anime of the Year, Best Voice Actor, Male and Female characters of the Year and Song of the Year
Germany	AnimaniA Awards	AnimagiC	Anime series and films, manga, video games and Japanese music, Awards by German anime magazine AnimaniA
Japan	Animation Kobe	City of Kobe	Creators and creations
Japan	Animax Anison Grand Prix	Animax	Anime song music competition
Japan	Animax Taishō	Animax	Anime scriptwriting
United States	Crunchyroll Anime Awards	Crunchyroll	Various categories
Japan	Japan Academy Film Prize for Animation of the Year	Japan Academy Film Prize	Animated film
Japan	Japan Media Arts Festival Animation awards	Agency for Cultural Affairs	Animation awards
Japan	Mainichi Film Award for Best Animation Film	Mainichi Film Awards	Best animated feature film
Japan	Newtype Anime Awards	Newtype	Anime, various categories
Japan	Ōfuji Noburō Award	Mainichi Film Awards	Animation excellence
Japan	Seiyu Awards	Tokyo Anime Center	Voice acting in anime and other media in Japan
Japan	Sugoi Japan Award	Yomiuri Shimbun	Manga, Anime, Light novel and Entertainment novel
Japan	Tokyo Anime Award	Tokyo International Anime Fair	Anime, various categories

== See also ==
- Lists of awards
- List of media awards
- List of film awards
- List of television awards
- List of submissions for the Academy Award for Best Animated Feature
