= Primetime Emmy Award for Outstanding Animated Program =

Award for animated programming

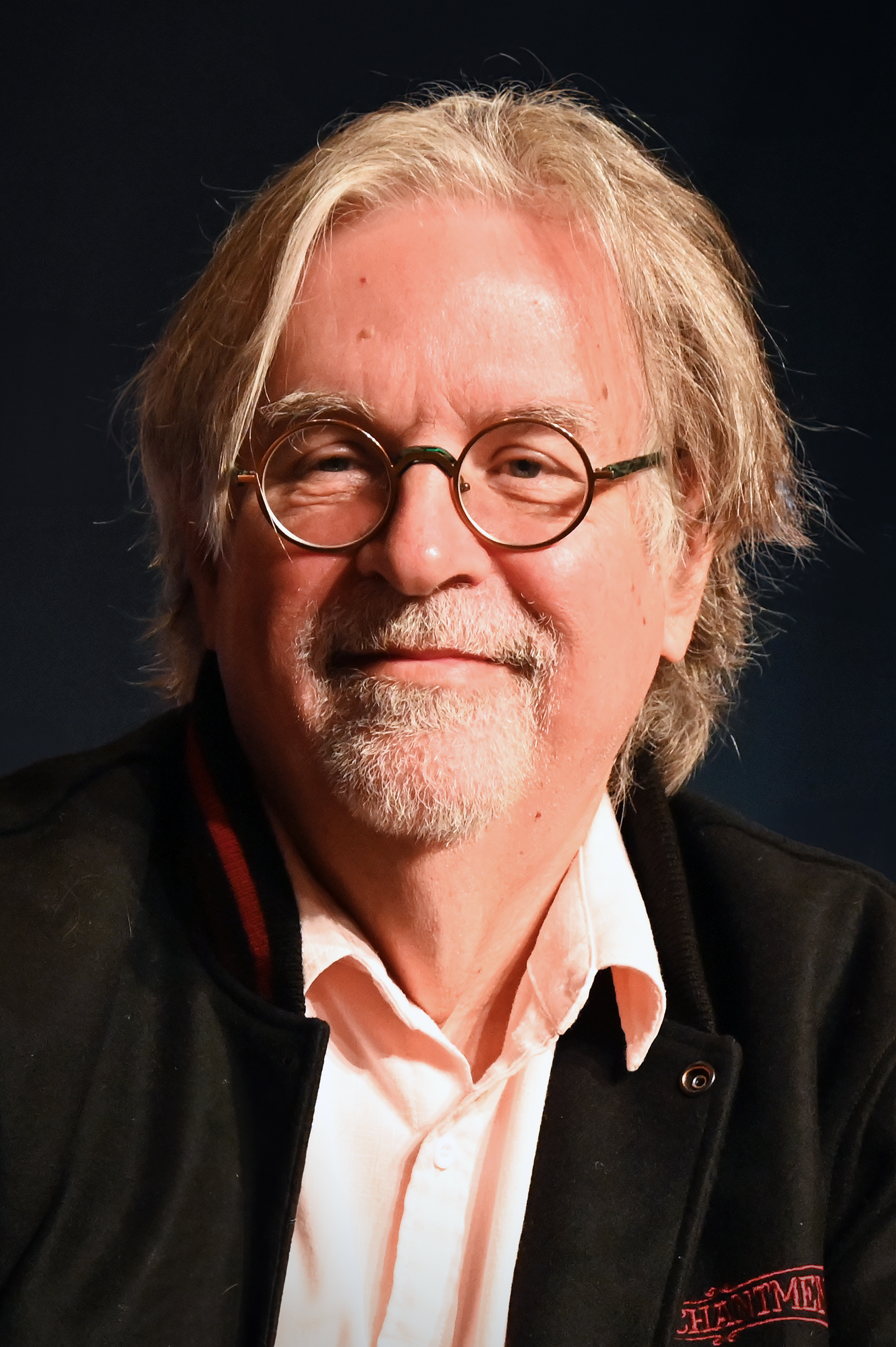
- Matt Groening, creator of The Simpsons and Futurama, received the most wins (14) and nominations (42) of that category.
- Awarded for: Outstanding Animated Program
- Country: United States
- Presented by: Academy of Television Arts & Sciences
- First award: 1979
- Currently held by: South Park (2026)
- Website: emmys.com

The Primetime Emmy Award for Outstanding Animated Program is a Creative Arts Emmy Award which is given annually to an animated series.

In the following list, the first titles listed in gold are the winners; those not in gold are nominees, which are listed in alphabetical order. The years given are those in which the ceremonies took place.

== Rules ==
Animated programs have the option to compete in broader program categories such as Outstanding Comedy Series, but cannot also submit for Outstanding Animation Program in the same year. The Simpsons, for instance, unsuccessfully submitted the episodes "A Streetcar Named Marge" and "Mr. Plow" in 1993 and 1994 while Family Guy was successfully nominated in 2009. Several animated programs won Outstanding Children's Program prior to 1979 and, in the years since, Rugrats, Winnie the Pooh specials and Star Wars Rebels have been nominated for that award.

Prior to 1989, all of the nominated programs were specials produced outside the confines of a running series. The category was divided into programs "one hour or less" and "more than one hour" from 1989 to 2009, with episodes of running series becoming eligible. Programs that are 15 minutes or less were given their own category, Outstanding Short Form Animated Program, in 2008.

== Winners and nominations ==
=== 1970s ===
Year	Program	Nominees	Network
1979 (31st)
1979 (31st)	The Lion, The Witch and the Wardrobe	David D. Connell, executive producer; Steven C. Melendez, producer	CBS
1979 (31st)	Happy Birthday, Charlie Brown	Lee Mendelson, producer	CBS
1979 (31st)	You're the Greatest, Charlie Brown	Lee Mendelson, executive producer; Bill Melendez, producer	CBS

=== 1980s ===
Year	Program	Nominees	Network
1980 (32nd)
1980 (32nd)	Carlton Your Doorman	Barton Dean & Lorenzo Music, producers	CBS
1980 (32nd)	Pontoffel Pock, Where Are You?	David H. DePatie & Friz Freleng, executive producers; Dr. Seuss	ABC
1980 (32nd)	The Pink Panther in: Olym-Pinks	David H. DePatie, executive producer; Friz Freleng, producer	ABC
1980 (32nd)	She's a Good Skate, Charlie Brown	Lee Mendelson, executive producer; Bill Melendez, producer	CBS
1981 (33rd)
1981 (33rd)	Life Is a Circus, Charlie Brown	Lee Mendelson, executive producer; Bill Melendez, producer	CBS
1981 (33rd)	Bugs Bunny: All American Hero	Hal Geer, executive producer; Friz Freleng, producer	CBS
1981 (33rd)	Faeries	Thomas W. Moore & Anne E. Upson, executive producers; Jack Zander, producer	CBS
1981 (33rd)	Gnomes	Thomas W. Moore, Jean Moore Edwards & Upson, executive producers; Lee Mishkin, Fred Hellmich & Norton Virgien, producers	CBS
1981 (33rd)	It's Magic, Charlie Brown	Lee Mendelson, executive producer; Bill Melendez, producer	CBS
1982 (34th)
1982 (34th)	The Grinch Grinches the Cat in the Hat	David H. DePatie, executive producer; Dr. Seuss & Friz Freleng, producers	ABC
1982 (34th)	A Charlie Brown Celebration	Lee Mendelson & Bill Melendez, producers	CBS
1982 (34th)	The Smurfs	William Hanna & Joseph Barbera, executive producers; Gerard Baldwin & Kay Wright, producers	NBC
1982 (34th)	The Smurfs Springtime Special	William Hanna & Joseph Barbera, executive producers; Gerard Baldwin, producer	NBC
1982 (34th)	Someday You'll Find Her, Charlie Brown	Lee Mendelson, executive producer; Bill Melendez, producer	CBS
1983 (35th)
1983 (35th)	Ziggy's Gift	Lena Tabori, executive producer; Richard Williams & Tom Wilson, producers	ABC
1983 (35th)	Here Comes Garfield	Jay Poynor, executive producer; Lee Mendelson & Bill Melendez, producers	CBS
1983 (35th)	Is This Goodbye, Charlie Brown?	Lee Mendelson & Bill Melendez, producers	CBS
1983 (35th)	The Smurfs Christmas Special	William Hanna & Joseph Barbera, executive producers; Gerard Baldwin, producer	NBC
1983 (35th)	What Have We Learned, Charlie Brown?	Lee Mendelson, executive producer; Bill Melendez, producer	CBS
1984 (36th)
1984 (36th)	Garfield on the Town	Jay Poynor, executive producer; Lee Mendelson & Bill Melendez, producers	CBS
1984 (36th)	A Disney Christmas Gift	—	CBS
1984 (36th)	It's Flashbeagle, Charlie Brown	Lee Mendelson & Bill Melendez, producers	CBS
1984 (36th)	The Smurfic Games	William Hanna & Joseph Barbera, executive producers; Gerard Baldwin, producer	NBC
1985 (37th)
1985 (37th)	Garfield in the Rough	Jay Poynor, executive producer; Phil Roman, producer/director; Jim Davis, writer	CBS
1985 (37th)	Donald Duck's 50th Birthday	Andrew Solt, producer/director/writer; Phil Savenick, co-producer; Peter Elbling, writer	CBS
1985 (37th)	Snoopy's Getting Married, Charlie Brown	Lee Mendelson, producer; Bill Melendez, producer/director; Charles M. Schulz, writer	CBS
1986 (38th)
1986 (38th)	Garfield's Halloween Adventure	Jay Poynor, executive producer; Phil Roman, producer/director; Jim Davis, writer	CBS
1986 (38th)	Garfield in Paradise	Jay Poynor, executive producer; Phil Roman, producer/director; Jim Davis, writer	CBS
1987 (39th)
1987 (39th)	Cathy	Lee Mendelson, executive producer; Bill Melendez, producer; Evert Brown, director; Cathy Guisewite, writer	CBS
1987 (39th)	Garfield Goes Hollywood	Phil Roman, producer/director; Jim Davis, writer	CBS
1988 (40th)
1988 (40th)	A Claymation Christmas Celebration	Will Vinton, executive producer/director; David Altschul, producer; Ralph Liddle, writer	CBS
1988 (40th)	The Brave Little Toaster	Peter Locke & Willard Carroll, executive producers; Donald Kushner & Thomas L. Wilhite, producers; Jerry Rees, director/writer; Joe Ranft, writer	Disney Channel
1988 (40th)	A Garfield Christmas Special	Phil Roman, producer/director; George Singer, co-director; Jim Davis, writer	CBS
1989 (41st)	One Hour or Less		
1989 (41st)	Garfield's Babes and Bullets	Phil Roman, producer/director; John Sparey & Bob Nesler, co-directors; Jim Davis, writer	CBS
1989 (41st)	Abel's Island	Giuliana Nicodemi, executive producer; Michael Sporn, producer/director/writer; Maxine Fisher, writer	PBS
1989 (41st)	Garfield: His 9 Lives	Phil Roman, producer/director; George Singer, John Sparey, Ruth Kissane, Bob Scott, Bob Nesler, Doug Frankel & Bill Littlejohn, co-directors; Jim Davis, writer	CBS
1989 (41st)	Madeline	Andy Heyward, Richard Rosen, Saul Cooper & Pancho Kohner, executive producers; Cassandra Schafhausen, producer; Stephan Martinière, director; Judy Rothman Rofé, writer	HBO
1989 (41st)	Meet the Raisins!	Will Vinton, executive producer; David Altschul, producer; Arthur Sellers, screenwriter/story by; Barry Bruce, director/story by; Mark Gustafson & Craig Bartlett, story by	CBS
1989 (41st)	More Than One Hour (Note: As a juried award, nominees had to garner 50% approval to win the award. The benchmark was not met and no award was given.)		
1989 (41st)	DuckTales: "Super DuckTales"	Bob Hathcock, producer; Ken Koonce & David Weimers, producers/written by; James T. Walker, director; Jymn Magon, written by	NBC

=== 1990s ===
Year	Program	Episode	Nominees	Network
1990 (42nd)
1990 (42nd)	The Simpsons	"Life on the Fast Lane"	Matt Groening, James L. Brooks & Sam Simon, executive producers; Richard Sakai, Al Jean, Mike Reiss & Larina Jean Adamson, co-producers; Margot Pipkin, animation producer; Gábor Csupó, supervising animation director; David Silverman, director; John Swartzwelder, writer	Fox
1990 (42nd)	Garfield's Feline Fantasies		Phil Roman, producer/director; John Sparey & Bob Nesler, co-directors; Jim Davis, writer	CBS
1990 (42nd)	Garfield's Thanksgiving		Phil Roman, producer/director; John Sparey, Bob Nesler & Gerard Baldwin, co-directors; Jim Davis & Kim Campbell, writers	CBS
1990 (42nd)	The Simpsons	"Simpsons Roasting on an Open Fire"	Matt Groening, James L. Brooks & Sam Simon, executive producers; Richard Sakai, producer; Al Jean, Mike Reiss & Larina Jean Adamson, co-producers; Margot Pipkin, animation producer; Gábor Csupó, supervising animation director; David Silverman, director; Mimi Pond, writer	Fox
1990 (42nd)	Why, Charlie Brown, Why?		Lee Mendelson, executive producer; Bill Melendez, producer; Sam Jaimes, director; Charles M. Schulz, writer	CBS
1991 (43rd)	One Hour or Less			
1991 (43rd)	The Simpsons	"Homer vs. Lisa and the 8th Commandment"	Matt Groening, James L. Brooks & Sam Simon, executive producers; Mike Reiss & Al Jean, supervising producers; Jay Kogen, Wallace Wolodarsky, Richard Sakai & Larina Jean Adamson, producers; George Meyer, co-producer; Gábor Csupó, executive animation producer; Sherry Gunther, animation producer; Rich Moore, director; Steve Pepoon, writer	Fox
1991 (43rd)	Garfield Gets a Life		Jim Davis, executive producer/writer; Phil Roman, producer; John Sparey, director	CBS
1991 (43rd)	Tiny Toon Adventures	"The Looney Beginning"	Steven Spielberg, executive producer; Tom Ruegger, producer/writer; Dave Marshall, Glen Kennedy & Rich Arons, directors; Paul Dini & Sherri Stoner, writers	CBS
1991 (43rd)	Will Vinton's Claymation Comedy of Horrors Show		Will Vinton, executive producer; Paul Diener, producer; Barry Bruce, screenplay/director; Mark Gustafson & Ryan Holznagel, screenplay	CBS
1991 (43rd)	More Than One Hour			
1991 (43rd)	TaleSpin	"Plunder & Lightning"	Jymn Magon, supervising producer/written by; Larry Latham & Robert Taylor, producers/directors; Mark Zaslove, co-producer/written by; Alan Burnett & Len Uhley, written by	Syndicated
1992 (44th)
1992 (44th)	Claymation Easter		Will Vinton, executive producer; Paul Diener, producer; Mark Gustafson, director/writer; Barry Bruce & Ryan Holznagel, writers	CBS
1992 (44th)	The Ren & Stimpy Show		Vanessa Coffey, executive producer; Mary Harrington, supervising producer; John Kricfalusi, producer/director/writer; Christine Danzo, producer; Bob Jaques, animation director; Bob Camp, Will McRobb & Mitchell Kriegman, writers	Nickelodeon
1992 (44th)	Shelley Duvall's Bedtime Stories		Shelley Duvall, executive producer; Art Leonardi, animation producer/director; Carol Davies, co-producer	Showtime
1992 (44th)	The Simpsons	"Radio Bart"	Matt Groening, James L. Brooks & Sam Simon, executive producers; Mike Reiss & Al Jean, co-executive producers; Jay Kogen & Wallace Wolodarsky, supervising producers; George Meyer, Richard Sakai & David Silverman, producers; John Swartzwelder, co-producer; Gábor Csupó, animation executive producer; Sherry Gunther, animation producer; Carlos Baeza, director; Jon Vitti, writer	Fox
1993 (45th)
1993 (45th)	Batman: The Animated Series	"Robin's Reckoning, Part 1"	Jean MacCurdy & Tom Ruegger, executive producers; Alan Burnett, Eric Radomski & Bruce Timm, producers; Dick Sebast, director; Randy Rogel, writer	Fox
1993 (45th)	Inspector Gadget Saves Christmas		Andy Heyward & Robby London, executive producers; Michael C. Gross & Joe Medjuck, supervising producers; Chuck Patton, producer/director; Jack Hanrahan & Eleanor Burian-Mohr, writers	NBC
1993 (45th)	Liquid Television	"Show 11"	Japhet Asher & Abby Terkuhle, executive producers; Prudence Fenton, producer; John Payson, supervising producer for MTV	MTV
1993 (45th)	The Ren & Stimpy Show	"Son of Stimpy"	Vanessa Coffey, executive producer; Mary Harrington & Roy Allen Smith, supervising producers; John Kricfalusi, producer/director/writer; Libby Simon & Jim Ballantine, producers; Frank Saperstein, co-producer; Bob Jaques, director; Vincent Waller & Richard Pursel, writers	Nickelodeon
1993 (45th)	The World of Peter Rabbit and Friends	"The Tale of Peter Rabbit and Benjamin Bunny"	John Coates & Ginger Gibbons, producers; Geoff Dunbar, director; Dianne Jackson, director/writer	The Family Channel
1994 (46th)
1994 (46th)	The Roman City		Bob Kurtz, producer/director/written by; Mark Olshaker, written by	PBS
1994 (46th)	Duckman	"TV or Not to Be"	Ron Osborn, Gábor Csupó, Arlene Klasky & Jeff Reno, executive producers; Sherry Gunther, producer; Everett Peck, creative producer; Raymie Muzquiz, director; Bernie Keating, written by	USA
1994 (46th)	A Flintstone Family Christmas		Joseph Barbera & William Hanna, executive producers; Larry Huber, producer; Chris Cuddington, animation director; Ray Patterson, director; Sean Roche & David Ehrman, writers	ABC
1994 (46th)	The Ren & Stimpy Show	"Ren's Retirement"	Vanessa Coffey, executive producer; Jim Ballantine, producer; Bob Camp & Lynne Naylor, directors/written by; Jim Gomez, Ron Hauge & Bill Wray, written by	Nickelodeon
1994 (46th)	The Town Santa Forgot		David Kirschner, executive producer; Davis Doi, producer; Paul Schibli & Lennie K. Graves, animation directors; Robert Alvarez, director; Glenn Leopold, writer	NBC
1995 (47th)
1995 (47th)	The Simpsons	"Lisa's Wedding"	Matt Groening, James L. Brooks, Sam Simon & David Mirkin, executive producers; Jace Richdale, George Meyer, J. Michael Mendel, Bill Oakley, David Sacks, Josh Weinstein, Jonathan Collier, Richard Raynis, Richard Sakai, Mike Scully & David Silverman, producers; Greg Daniels, producer/writer; Al Jean & Mike Reiss, consulting producers; Phil Roman, animation executive producer; Bill Schultz & Michael Wolf, animation producers; Jim Reardon, director	Fox
1995 (47th)	Dexter's Laboratory	"Changes"	Larry Huber, producer; Genndy Tartakovsky, animation director/writer; Buzz Potamkin, animation executive producer	Cartoon Network
1995 (47th)	Daisy-Head Mayzie		Audrey Geisel, executive producer; Christopher O'Hare, animation producer; Buzz Potamkin, animation executive producer; Tony Collingwood, animation director; Dr. Seuss (posthumously), animation writer	TNT
1995 (47th)	Rugrats	"A Rugrats Passover"	Gábor Csupó, Arlene Klasky & Vanessa Coffey, executive producers; Mary Harrington, supervising producer; Charles Swenson, creative producer; Paul Germain, creative producer/writer; Geraldine Clarke, producer; Jeff McGrath, Jim Duffy & Steve Socki, directors; Peter Gaffney, Jonathan Greenberg & Rachel Lipman, written by	Nickelodeon
1995 (47th)	Tiny Toon Adventures	"Night Ghoulery"	Steven Spielberg, executive producer; Tom Ruegger, senior producer; Michael Gerard, producer/director; Peter Hastings, producer/writer; Rich Arons, director/writer; Rusty Mills & Greg Reyna, directors; Paul Dini & Paul Rugg, writers	Fox
1996 (48th)
1996 (48th)	Pinky and the Brain	"A Pinky and the Brain Christmas"	Steven Spielberg, executive producer; Tom Ruegger, senior producer; Peter Hastings, producer/writer; Rusty Mills, producer/director; Barry Caldwell, storyboard artist; Llyn Hunter, storyboard artist	The WB
1996 (48th)	Cow and Chicken	"No Smoking"	Buzz Potamkin, executive producer; Larry Huber, supervising producer; David Feiss, director/writer; Pilar Menendez & Sam Kieth, writers	Cartoon Network
1996 (48th)	Dexter's Laboratory	"The Big Sister"	Larry Huber, executive producer; Genndy Tartakovsky, Craig McCracken & Paul Rudish, directors	Cartoon Network
1996 (48th)	Duckman	"Noir Gang"	Ron Osborn, Gábor Csupó, Arlene Klasky & Jeff Reno, executive producers; David Misch, supervising producer; Margot Pipkin, producer; Everett Peck, creative producer; Eva Almos & Ed Scharlach, writers	USA
1996 (48th)	The Simpsons	"Treehouse of Horror VI"	Matt Groening, James L. Brooks, Sam Simon, Bill Oakley & Josh Weinstein, executive producers; Greg Daniels & George Meyer, co-executive producers; Mike Scully, supervising producers; Steve Tompkins, supervising producer/writer; David X. Cohen, co-producer/writer; Jonathan Collier, Ken Keeler, J. Michael Mendel, Richard Raynis, David Silverman & Richard Sakai, producers; Brent Forrester, co-producer; Al Jean, Mike Reiss, David Mirkin & Ian Maxtone-Graham, consulting producers; Phil Roman, animation executive producer; Bill Schultz & Michael Wolf, animation producers; Bob Anderson, director; John Swartzwelder, writer	Fox
1997 (49th)	One Hour or Less			
1997 (49th)	The Simpsons	"Homer's Phobia"	Matt Groening, James L. Brooks, Sam Simon, Mike Scully, George Meyer, Steve Tompkins, Bill Oakley & Josh Weinstein, executive producers; Jonathan Collier, Ken Keeler, David X. Cohen, Richard Appel, J. Michael Mendel, Richard Raynis, David Silverman, Richard Sakai, Denise Sirkot, Colin A.B.V. Lewis, David Mirkin, Ian Maxtone-Graham & Dan McGrath, producers; Phil Roman, animation executive producer; Bill Schultz & Michael Wolf, animation producers; Mike B. Anderson, director; Ron Hauge, writer	Fox
1997 (49th)	Dexter's Laboratory	"Star Spangled Sidekicks" / "TV Super Pals" / "Game Over"	Sherry Gunther & Larry Huber, executive producers; Craig McCracken & Genndy Tartakovsky, directors; Jason Butler Rote, writer	Cartoon Network
1997 (49th)	Duckman	"Duckman and Cornfed in Haunted Society Plumbers"	David Misch, executive producer/writer; Ron Osborn, Gábor Csupó, Arlene Klasky & Jeff Reno, executive producers; Michael Markowitz, supervising producer/writer; Gene Laufenberg, producer/writer; Mitch Watson, producer; Everett Peck, creative producer; Peter Avanzino, director	USA
1997 (49th)	King of the Hill	"Square Peg"	Mike Judge, Greg Daniels, Howard Klein & Michael Rotenberg, executive producers; Jonathan Collier, Cheryl Holliday and David Zuckerman, supervising producers; Joseph A. Boucher & Richard Raynis, producers; Phil Roman, animation executive producer; Bill Schultz & Michael Wolf, animation producers; Gary McCarver, director; Joe Stillman, writer	Fox
1997 (49th)	Rugrats	"Mother's Day"	Gábor Csupó & Arlene Klasky, executive producers; Mary Harrington, executive producer for Nickelodeon; Kathrin Seitz, supervising producer for Nickelodeon; Margot Pipkin and Eryk Casemiro, coordinating producers; Paul Demeyer, creative producer; Norton Virgien & Toni Vian, directors; Jon Cooksey, Ali Marie Matheson, J. David Stem & David N. Weiss, writers	Nickelodeon
1997 (49th)	More Than One Hour			
1997 (49th)	The Willows in Winter		Jonathan Peel, executive producer; Peter Orton, co-executive producer; John Coates, producer; Dave Unwin, director; Ted Walker, writer	The Family Channel
1998 (50th)
1998 (50th)	The Simpsons	"Trash of the Titans"	Matt Groening, James L. Brooks, Sam Simon & Mike Scully, executive producers; George Meyer, David X. Cohen & Richard Appel, co-executive producers; Ron Hauge, Dan Greaney, Donick Cary, Colin A.B.V. Lewis, Bonita Pietila, J. Michael Mendel, Richard Raynis, Richard Sakai & Denise Sirkot, producers; Brian Scully & Julie Thacker, co-producers; Ian Maxtone-Graham, consulting producer/writer; David Mirkin, Jace Richdale, Bill Oakley & Josh Weinstein, consulting producers; Phil Roman, animation executive producer; Lolee Aries & Michael Wolf, animation producers; Jim Reardon, director	Fox
1998 (50th)	Cow and Chicken	"Free Inside" / "Journey to the Center of the Cow"	Davis Doi, supervising producer; Vincent Davis, producer; David Feiss, director; Steve Marmel, Richard Pursel & Michael Ryan, writers	Cartoon Network
1998 (50th)	Dexter's Laboratory	"Dyno-Might" / "LAB-retto"	Davis Doi, supervising producer; Genndy Tartakovsky, producer/director; Jason Butler Rote & Michael Ryan, writers	Cartoon Network
1998 (50th)	King of the Hill	"Texas City Twister"	Mike Judge, Greg Daniels, Howard Klein & Michael Rotenberg, executive producers; Brent Forrester & David Zuckerman, co-executive producers; Cheryl Holliday, co-executive producer/writer; Joseph A. Boucher and Richard Raynis, producers; Jonathan Aibel and Glenn Berger, Joe Stillman & Mark McJimsey, co-producers; Jonathan Collier, consulting producer; Phil Roman, animation executive producer; Lolee Aries & Michael Wolf, animation producers; Wes Archer, supervising director; Jeff Myers, director	Fox
1998 (50th)	South Park	"Big Gay Al's Big Gay Boat Ride"	Trey Parker, executive producer/writer/director; Matt Stone, executive producer/writer; Anne Garefino, Deborah Liebling & Brian Graden, executive producers; Pam Brady, creative producer; Frank C. Agnone II, supervising producer; Eric Stough, animation director	Comedy Central
1999 (51st)	One Hour or Less			
1999 (51st)	King of the Hill	"And They Call It Bobby Love"	Mike Judge, Greg Daniels, Richard Appel, Howard Klein & Michael Rotenberg, executive producers; Jonathan Collier, co-executive producer; Jonathan Aibel, Glenn Berger, Alan R. Cohen and Alan Freedland, supervising producers; Joseph A. Boucher, Johnny Hardwick & Paul Lieberstein, producers; Norm Hiscock, producer/writer; Jim Dauterive & Mark McJimsey, co-producers; Jon Vitti, Cheryl Holliday, Richard Raynis & David Zuckerman, consulting producers; Lolee Aries & David Pritchard, animation executive producers; Michael Wolf, animation producer; Wes Archer, supervising director; Cyndi Tang, director	Fox
1999 (51st)	Futurama	"A Big Piece of Garbage"	Matt Groening & David X. Cohen, executive producers; Ken Keeler & Eric Horsted, co-executive producers; Brian J. Cowan, J. Stewart Burns, Patric Verrone & Jason Grode, producers; Lew Morton, producer/writer; Mili Smythe & Alex Johns, co-producers; Tom Gammill and Max Pross & Richard Raynis, consulting producers; Claudia Katz, animation producer; Gregg Vanzo & Rich Moore, supervising directors; Susie Dietter, director	Fox
1999 (51st)	The PJs	"He's Gotta Have It"	Steve Tompkins, Larry Wilmore, Brian Grazer, Ron Howard, Tony Krantz, Eddie Murphy, Will Vinton & Tom Turpin, executive producers; Bill Freiberger & David Flebotte, supervising producers; Mary Sandell, David Bleiman Ichioka, Michael Price & J. Michael Mendel, producers; Al Jean & Mike Reiss, consulting producers; Les Firestein, consulting producer/writer; Donald R. Beck, co-producer; Mark Gustafson, supervising director	Fox
1999 (51st)	The Powerpuff Girls	"Bubblevicious" / "The Bare Facts"	Genndy Tartakovsky, producer/director; Craig McCracken & John McIntyre, directors; Amy Keating Rogers & Jason Butler Rote, writers	Cartoon Network
1999 (51st)	The Simpsons	"Viva Ned Flanders"	Matt Groening, Mike Scully, David X. Cohen, James L. Brooks & Sam Simon, executive producers; George Meyer, Ian Maxtone-Graham & Al Jean, co-executive producers; Ron Hauge, Dan Greaney & Donick Cary, supervising producers; Brian Scully, Julie Thacker, Larina Jean Adamson, Colin A.B.V. Lewis, Mendel, Bonita Pietila, Raynis, Richard Sakai, Denise Sirkot, Carolyn Omine & Tom Martin, producers; Larry Doyle & Matt Selman, co-producers; Jace Richdale, Frank Mula, Tom Gammill, Max Pross & David Mirkin, consulting producers; David M. Stern, consulting producer/writer; Lolee Aries, David Pritchard & Phil Roman, animation executive producers; Michael Wolf, animation producer; Joel Kuwahara, animation co-producer; Jim Reardon, supervising director; Neil Affleck, director	Fox
1999 (51st)	More Than One Hour			
1999 (51st)	Todd McFarlane's Spawn		Todd McFarlane, executive producer; John Leekley, co-executive producer/writer; Randall White, producer; Brad Rader, Jennifer Yuh Nelson, Thomas A. Nelson, Chuck Patton and Mike Vosburg, directors; Rebekah Bradford Leekley, writer; Frank Paur, supervising director	HBO
1999 (51st)	Our Friend, Martin		Andy Heyward, Robby London, Michael Maliani & Madison Jones, executive producer; Janice Sonski, coordinating producer; Vincenzo Trippetti & Robert Brousseau, directors; Dawn Comer Jefferson, Chris Simmons, Sib Ventress & Deborah Pratt, writers	Starz

=== 2000s ===
Year	Program	Episode	Nominees	Network
2000 (52nd)	One Hour or Less			
2000 (52nd)	The Simpsons	"Behind the Laughter"	Matt Groening, James L. Brooks, Al Jean & Sam Simon, executive producers; Mike Scully & George Meyer, executive producers/writers; Ian Maxtone-Graham, Ron Hauge, Dan Greaney, Frank Mula & Rob LaZebnik, co-executive producers; Julie Thacker & Larina Jean Adamson, supervising producers; Bonita Pietila, Carolyn Omine, Denise Sirkot, Don Payne, Richard Raynis, Richard Sakai, Tom Martin, John Frink & Larry Doyle, producers; Matt Selman, producer/writer; David Pritchard & Lolee Aries, animation executive producers; Michael Wolf, animation producer; Tim Long, writer; Jim Reardon, supervising director; Mark Kirkland, director	Fox
2000 (52nd)	Downtown	"Before and After"	Abby Terkuhle, executive producer; John Lynn, supervising producer; David McGrath, producer; Eric Friedman, writer; Chris Prynoski, supervising director; Tony Kluck, director	MTV
2000 (52nd)	Family Guy	"Road to Rhode Island"	Seth MacFarlane & David Zuckerman, executive producers; Craig Hoffman, Daniel Palladino & Danny Smith, co-executive producers; Billiam Coronel, Matt Weitzman, Mike Barker and Sherry Gunther, producers; Gary Janetti, writer; Pete Michels and Peter Shin, supervising directors; Dan Povenmire, director	Fox
2000 (52nd)	The Powerpuff Girls	"Beat Your Greens" / "Down 'n Dirty"	Genndy Tartakovsky, supervising producer; Craig McCracken & Randy Myers, directors; John McIntyre, writer/director; Amy Keating Rogers, writer; Robert Alvarez, animation directors	Cartoon Network
2000 (52nd)	South Park	"Chinpokomon"	Trey Parker, executive producer/writer/director; Matt Stone, Anne Garefino & Deborah Liebling, executive producers; Frank C. Agnone II, producer; Eric Stough, animation director	Comedy Central
2000 (52nd)	More Than One Hour			
2000 (52nd)	Walking with Dinosaurs		John Lynch & Tomi Bednar Landis, executive producers; Tim Haines & Jasper James, producers/directors; Georgann Kane, writer; Mike Milne, computer animation director	Discovery Channel
2000 (52nd)	Olive, the Other Reindeer		Matt Groening, Drew Barrymore, Nancy Juvonen & Claudia De La Roca, executive producers; Alex Johns, producer; John A. Davis, animation director/producer; Keith Alcorn, animation producer; Steve Young, writer; Steve Moore, director	Fox
2001 (53rd)	One Hour or Less			
2001 (53rd)	The Simpsons	"HOMR"	Matt Groening, James L. Brooks, Mike Scully, George Meyer & Sam Simon, executive producers; Al Jean, executive producer/writer; Ian Maxtone-Graham, Ron Hauge, Dan Greaney, Frank Mula & Rob LaZebnik, co-executive producers; Julie Thacker & Larina Jean Adamson, supervising producers; Larry Doyle, Tom Martin, Carolyn Omine, Tim Long, John Frink, Don Payne, Matt Selman, Mike Reiss, Tom Gammill and Max Pross & David Mirkin, producers; Richard Raynis, Bonita Pietila, Denise Sirkot & Richard Sakai, produced by; Jim Reardon, supervising director; Mike B. Anderson, director; John W. Hyde & John Bush, animation executive producers; Michael Wolf & Laurie Biernacki, animation producers	Fox
2001 (53rd)	As Told by Ginger	"Hello Stranger"	Arlene Klasky & Gabor Csupo, executive producers; Eryk Casemiro, co-executive producer; Cella Nichols Duffy, supervising producer; Kate Boutilier, Maureen Iser & Sylvia Keulen, producers; Emily Kapnek, writer; Mark Risley, director	Nickelodeon
2001 (53rd)	Futurama	"Amazon Women in the Mood"	Matt Groening & David X. Cohen, executive producers; Ken Keeler & Eric Horsted, co-executive producers; Lew Morton, Patric Verrone & J. Stewart Burns, supervising producers; Bill Odenkirk, Eric Kaplan, Brian J. Cowan & Claudia Katz, producers; Rich Moore, supervising director; Gregg Vanzo, animation executive producer; Brian Sheesley, director	Fox
2001 (53rd)	King of the Hill	"Chasing Bobby"	Mike Judge, Greg Daniels, Richard Appel, Howard Klein & Michael Rotenberg, executive producers; Jonathan Aibel and Glenn Berger, Alan R. Cohen, Alan Freedland, Norm Hiscock & Paul Lieberstein, co-executive producers; Johnny Hardwick, Jim Dauterive, John Altschuler & Dave Krinsky, supervising producers; Joseph A. Boucher & Mark McJimsey, produced by; Garland Testa, producer/writer; Alex Gregory & Peter Huyck, producers; Klay Hall & John Rice, supervising directors; Tricia Garcia, director; John W. Hyde, animation executive producer; Michael Wolf, animation producer; Hall & Rice, supervising directors; Anthony Lioi, director	Fox
2001 (53rd)	The Powerpuff Girls	"Moral Decay" / "Meet the Beat Alls"	Craig McCracken, executive producer/writer/director; Genndy Tartakovsky, supervising producer; Amy Keating Rogers & Lauren Faust, writers; John McIntyre & Robert Alvarez, directors	Cartoon Network
2001 (53rd)	More Than One Hour			
2001 (53rd)	Allosaurus: A Walking with Dinosaurs Special		Mick Kaczorowski, executive producer; Sharon Reed and William Sargent, animation executive producers; Tim Haines, animation producer; Mike Milne, animation director; Kate Bartlett & Michael Olmert, writers	Discovery Channel
2002 (54th)	One Hour or Less			
2002 (54th)	Futurama	"Roswell That Ends Well"	Matt Groening & David X. Cohen, executive producers; Ken Keeler & Eric Horsted, co-executive producers; Lew Morton and Patric Verrone, supervising producers; J. Stewart Burns, supervising producer/writer; Bill Odenkirk, Eric Kaplan & Brian J. Cowan & Claudia Katz, producers; Rich Moore, supervising director; Gregg Vanzo, animation executive producer	Fox
2002 (54th)	As Told by Ginger	"Lunatic Lake"	Arlene Klasky & Gabor Csupo, executive producers; Eryk Casemiro, co-executive producer/writer; Emily Kapnek, co-executive producer; Cella Nichols Duffy, Jim Duffy & Mark Risley, supervising producers; Maureen Iser, produced by; Michael Daedalus Kenny, director; Mike Svayko, Jeffrey Perlmutter & Barbara Ann Duffy, animation timing supervisors	Nickelodeon
2002 (54th)	King of the Hill	"Bobby Goes Nuts"	Mike Judge, Greg Daniels, Richard Appel, Howard Klein & Michael Rotenberg, executive producers; Jonathan Aibel and Glenn Berger, Alan R. Cohen & Alan Freedland, co-executive producers; Norm Hiscock, co-executive producer/writer; Johnny Hardwick, Jim Dauterive, John Altschuler & Dave Krinsky, supervising producers; Joseph A. Boucher & Mark McJimsey, produced by; Garland Testa, Alex Gregory, Peter Huyck, Sivert Glarum, Michael Jamin, Kit Boss & Dean Young, producers; Klay Hall & John Rice, supervising directors; Tricia Garcia, director; John W. Hyde, animation executive producer; Michael Wolf, animation producer	Fox
2002 (54th)	The Simpsons	"She of Little Faith"	Matt Groening, James L. Brooks, Al Jean & Sam Simon, executive producers; Ian Maxtone-Graham, Matt Selman & Josh Lieb, co-executive producers; Larina Jean Adamson, Carolyn Omine, Tim Long, John Frink, Don Payne, Dana Gould, Kevin Curran and Brian Kelley, supervising producers; George Meyer, Dan Greaney, Ron Hauge, Tom Gammill and Max Pross, David Mirkin, Mike Reiss, Jon Vitti, Richard Raynis, Bonita Pietila, David Silverman, Denise Sirkot, Richard Sakai & Joel H. Cohen, producers; Michael Wolf & Laurie Biernacki, animation producers; John W. Hyde & John Bush, animation executive producers; Jim Reardon, supervising director; Bill Freiberger, written by; Steven Dean Moore, director	Fox
2002 (54th)	South Park	"Osama bin Laden Has Farty Pants"	Trey Parker, executive producer/writer/director; Matt Stone, Anne Garefino & Deborah Liebling, executive producers; Jennifer Howell, supervising producer; Frank C. Agnone II, producer; Eric Stough, animation director; David R. Goodman, Kyle McCulloch, Nancy Pimental & Erica Rivinoja, writers	Comedy Central
2002 (54th)	More Than One Hour			
2002 (54th)	Walking with Prehistoric Beasts		Tim Haines & Mick Kaczorowski, executive producers; Jasper James, producer/writer; Nigel Paterson, producer/director/writer; Sharon Reed & William Sargent, computer animation executive producers; Mike Milne, computer animation director; Kate Bartlett & Michael Olmert, writers	Discovery Channel
2002 (54th)	Samurai Jack	"The Premiere Movie"	Genndy Tartakovsky, executive producer/writer director; Brian A. Miller, supervising producer; Paul Rudish, writer; Yu Mun Jeong, Chang Yul Jung & Jae Bong Koh, animation directors	Cartoon Network
2002 (54th)	When Dinosaurs Roamed America		Pierre de Lespinois, executive producer/director; Fran Lo Cascio & Tomi Bednar Landis, executive producers; John Copeland, produced by; Georgann Kane, writer; Don Waller, animation director	Discovery Channel
2003 (55th)	One Hour or Less			
2003 (55th)	The Simpsons	"Three Gays of the Condo"	Matt Groening, James L. Brooks, & Al Jean, executive producers; Ian Maxtone-Graham, Matt Selman, Dan Greaney, Carolyn Omine, Tim Long, John Frink, Don Payne, Dana Gould & Kevin Curran, co-executive producers; Larina Jean Adamson, supervising producer; Michael Wolf, animation executive producer; Laurie Biernacki and Rick Polizzi, animation producers; Matt Warburton, writer; Mark Kirkland, director; Jim Reardon, supervising director; Matthew Faughnan, assistant director; Milton Gray, animation timer	Fox
2003 (55th)	As Told by Ginger	"And She Was Gone"	Arlene Klasky & Gabor Csupo, executive producers; Eryk Casemiro, co-executive producer; Emily Kapnek, co-executive producer/writer; Cella Nichols Duffy and Jim Duffy, supervising producers; Maureen Iser, produced by; Mark Risley, supervising director/director; Jeffrey Perlmutter, supervising assistant director; Mike Svayko, animation timing supervisor	Nickelodeon
2003 (55th)	Futurama	"Jurassic Bark"	Matt Groening, David X. Cohen & Ken Keeler, executive producers; David A. Goodman, co-executive producer; Eric Kaplan, supervising producer/writer; Patric Verrone & Bill Odenkirk, supervising producers; Eric Horsted, Michael Rowe, Brian J. Cowan & Claudia Katz, producers; Gregg Vanzo, animation executive producer; Rich Moore, supervising director; Scott Vanzo, director of computer graphics; Swinton O. Scott III, director; Celeste Mari Williams, animation timer	Fox
2003 (55th)	Kim Possible	"Crush"	Robert Schooley & Mark McCorkle, executive producers/writers; Chris Bailey, executive producer/director; J.K. Kim, Bob Treat & Marsh Lamore, timing directors	Disney Channel
2003 (55th)	SpongeBob SquarePants	"New Student Starfish" / "Clams"	Stephen Hillenburg, executive producer; Derek Drymon, supervising producer; Paul Tibbitt, Kent Osborne, Mark O'Hare, Jay Lender & Sam Henderson, written by; Tom Yasumi & Sean Dempsey, animation directors; Alan Smart, supervising director; Juli Murphy, sheet timer	Nickelodeon
2003 (55th)	More Than One Hour			
2003 (55th)	Chased by Dinosaurs		Gaynelle Evans, executive producer; Adam Kemp, BBC executive producer; Tim Haines & Jasper James, producers/directors/writers; Mike Milne, director of CGI; Sharon Reed, William Sargent and Fiona Walkinshaw, executive producers of CGI	Discovery Channel
2004 (56th)	One Hour or Less			
2004 (56th)	Samurai Jack	"The Birth of Evil"	Genndy Tartakovsky, executive producer/producer/written by/directed by; Brian A. Miller, supervising producer; Don Shank, written by; Robert Alvarez, directed by/sheet timing; Randy Myers, directed by; Yu Mun Jeong and Bong Koh Jae, animation directors; James T. Walker, sheet timing	Cartoon Network
2004 (56th)	Futurama	"The Sting"	Matt Groening, David X. Cohen and Ken Keeler, executive producers; David A. Goodman, co-executive producer; Patric Verrone, supervising producer/written by; Eric Kaplan and Bill Odenkirk, supervising producers; Michael Rowe & Brian J. Cowan, producers; Claudia Katz, produced by; Gregg Vanzo, animation executive producer; Rich Moore, supervising director; Scott Vanzo, director of computer graphics; Brian Sheesley, director; Stephanie Arnett, assistant director	Fox
2004 (56th)	The Simpsons	"The Way We Weren't"	Matt Groening, James L. Brooks & Al Jean, executive producers; Ian Maxtone-Graham, Matt Selman, Dan Greaney, Carolyn Omine, Tim Long, John Frink, Don Payne, Dana Gould, Kevin Curran, Brian Kelley & Michael Priceco-executive producers; Laurie Biernacki and Rick Polizzi, animation producers; J. Stewart Burns, written by; Mike B. Anderson, director; Jim Reardon, supervising director; Norman Auble, assistant director; Patrick Buchanan, timer	Fox
2004 (56th)	South Park	"It's Christmas in Canada"	Trey Parker, executive producer/writer/director; Matt Stone & Anne Garefino, executive producers; Jennifer Howell, supervising producer; Frank C. Agnone II, producer; Eric Stough, director of animation	Comedy Central
2004 (56th)	SpongeBob SquarePants	"Ugh"	Stephen Hillenburg, executive producer; Derek Drymon, supervising producer; Paul Tibbitt & Kent Osborne, written by; Andrew Overtoom, animation director; Alan Smart, supervising director; Juli Murphy, sheet timer	Nickelodeon
2004 (56th)	More Than One Hour			
2004 (56th)	Star Wars: Clone Wars	"Chapters 1-20"	Claudia Katz & Brian A. Miller, executive producers; Genndy Tartakovsky, produced by/directed by/story by/animation director; Geraldine Symon, producer; Jennifer Pelphrey, supervising producer; Bryan Andrews, Mark Andrews, Darrick Bachman & Paul Rudish, story by; Scott Vanzo, director of computer animation; Yu Mun Jeong, animation director; Robert Alvarez, sheet timer	Cartoon Network
2004 (56th)	The Powerpuff Girls	"'Twas the Fight Before Christmas"	Craig McCracken, executive producer; Chris Savino, producer; Brian A. Miller, supervising producer; Lauren Faust, written by/supervising director; Craig Lewis, written by; Amy Keating Rogers, story by; Robert Alvarez, John McIntyre & Randy Myers, animation directors; James T. Walker & Juli Murphy, sheet timers	Cartoon Network
2005 (57th)	One Hour or Less			
2005 (57th)	South Park	"Best Friends Forever"	Trey Parker, executive producer/writer/director; Matt Stone & Anne Garefino, executive producers; Jennifer Howell, supervising producer; Frank C. Agnone II, producer; Eric Stough, director of animation	Comedy Central
2005 (57th)	Family Guy	"North by North Quahog"	Seth MacFarlane, executive producer/writer; David A. Goodman & Chris Sheridan, executive producers; Danny Smith, co-executive producer; Kara Vallow, producer; Shannon Smith, animation producer; Peter Shin, supervising director/director; Greg Colton, assistant director	Fox
2005 (57th)	Samurai Jack	"The Four Seasons of Death"	Genndy Tartakovsky, executive producer/producer/directed by; Brian A. Miller, supervising producer; Bryan Andrews & Mark Andrews, written by; Hueng-soon Park & Kwang-bae Park, animation directors; Randy Myers, directed by; James T. Walker, sheet timing	Cartoon Network
2005 (57th)	The Simpsons	"Future-Drama"	Matt Groening, James L. Brooks, Al Jean and Ian Maxtone-Graham, executive producers; Dan Greaney, Carolyn Omine, Tim Long, John Frink, Don Payne, Dana Gould, Kevin Curran, Michael Price, J. Stewart Burns & Bill Odenkirk, co-executive producers; Laurie Biernacki & Rick Polizzi, animation producers; Matt Selman, written by; Mike B. Anderson, directed by; David Silverman, supervising director; Ralph Sosa, assistant director; Robert Ingram, animation timer	Fox
2005 (57th)	SpongeBob SquarePants	"Fear of a Krabby Patty" / "Shell of Man"	Stephen Hillenburg, executive producer; Paul Tibbitt, supervising producer/written by/director; Mike Bell & C. H. Greenblatt, written by/storyboard directors; Vincent Waller, storyboard director; Alan Smart & Tom Yasumi, animation directors	Nickelodeon
2005 (57th)	More Than One Hour			
2005 (57th)	Star Wars: Clone Wars	"Chapters 21-25"	Claudia Katz & Brian A. Miller, executive producers; Jennifer Pelphrey, supervising producer; Shareena Carlson & Geraldine Symon, producers; Genndy Tartakovsky, produced by/directed by/story by/animation direction; Bryan Andrews, Darrick Bachman & Paul Rudish, story by; Yu Mun Jeong, supervising director; Dong Soo Lee & Jong Ho Kim, directors; Scott Vanzo, director of computer animation; Robert Alvarez & Randy Myers, sheet timers	Cartoon Network
2005 (57th)	Dragons: A Fantasy Made Real		David McNab, executive producer/story by/written by; John Smithson, Alice Keens-Soper, Rola Bauer & Tim Halkin, executive producers; Ceri Barnes, produced by; Charlie Foley, story by/written by; Justin Hardy, story by/written by/directed by; Kevin Tao Mohs, story by/co-writer; Aidan Woodward, co-writer; Mike Milne, director of computer animation	Animal Planet
2006 (58th)	One Hour or Less			
2006 (58th)	The Simpsons	"The Seemingly Never-Ending Story"	Matt Groening, James L. Brooks, Al Jean, Matt Selman, Carolyn Omine & Tim Long, executive producers; John Frink, Don Payne, Dana Gould, Kevin Curran, J. Stewart Burns, Michael Price, Bill Odenkirk & Joel H. Cohen, co-executive producers; Laurie Biernacki & Rick Polizzi, animation producers; Ian Maxtone-Graham, written by; David Silverman, supervising director; Raymond S. Persi, director; Shannon O'Connor, assistant director; Richard Gasparian, animation timer	Fox
2006 (58th)	Camp Lazlo	"Hello Dolly / Over Cooked Beans"	Joe Murray & Brian A. Miller, executive producers; Mark O'Hare & Jennifer Pelphrey, supervising producers; Shareena Carlson, producer; Merriwether Williams, Steve Little & Kazimieras G. Prapuolenis, story by; Mike Roth & Clay Morrow, written by/storyboard directors; Kent Osborne & Cosmo Segurson, written by; Brian Sheesley, supervising director/directed by; Lindsey Pollard, Jon Ho Kim & Dong-kun Won, animation directors; Phil Cummings & Maureen Mlynarczyk, sheet timers	Cartoon Network
2006 (58th)	Family Guy	"PTV"	Seth MacFarlane, David A. Goodman & Chris Sheridan, executive producers; Danny Smith, co-executive producer; Michael Rowe, supervising producer; Kara Vallow, producer; Shannon Smith, animation producer; Alec Sulkin & Wellesley Wild, written by; Peter Shin, supervising director; Dan Povenmire, director; Chris Robertson, assistant director; Andi Klein, timing supervisor	Fox
2006 (58th)	Foster's Home for Imaginary Friends	"Go Goo Go"	Craig McCracken, executive producer/director; Brian A. Miller, executive producer; Lauren Faust, supervising producer/animation director/written by; Jennifer Pelphrey, supervising producer; Vincent Aniceto, producer; Robert Alvarez & Eric Pringle, animation directors	Cartoon Network
2006 (58th)	South Park	"Trapped in the Closet"	Trey Parker, executive producer/writer/director; Matt Stone & Anne Garefino, executive producers; Frank C. Agnone II, producer; Eric Stough, director of animation	Comedy Central
2006 (58th)	More Than One Hour			
2006 (58th)	Before the Dinosaurs		Adam Kemp, Tim Haines & Gaynelle Evans, executive producers; Fiona Walkinshaw & William Sargent, executive producers of computer animation; Chloë Leland, producer/director; Greg Smith, producer; Michael Olmert, writer; Mike Milne, director of computer animation	Discovery Channel
2006 (58th)	My Life as a Teenage Robot	"Escape from Cluster Prime"	Rob Renzetti, executive producer/director/original story/written by; Fred Seibert, executive producer; Scott D. Peterson, original story/written by; Alex Kirwan, original story; Brandon Kruse, Heather Martinez, Chris Reccardi & Bryan Andrews, written by; Chris Savino, director; Robert Alvarez, sheet timer	Nickelodeon
2007 (59th)	One Hour or Less			
2007 (59th)	South Park	"Make Love, Not Warcraft"	Trey Parker, executive producer/writer/director; Matt Stone & Anne Garefino, executive producers; Frank C. Agnone II, supervising producer; Kyle McCulloch, producer; Eric Stough, director of animation	Comedy Central
2007 (59th)	Avatar: The Last Airbender	"City of Walls and Secrets"	Michael Dante DiMartino, Bryan Konietzko & Eric Coleman, executive producers; Aaron Ehasz, co-executive producer/head writer; Tim Hedrick, written by; Lauren MacMullan, directed by; Yu Jae Myoung, animation director/timing director	Nickelodeon
2007 (59th)	Robot Chicken	"Lust for Puppets"	Seth Green, executive producer/writer/director; Matthew Senreich, executive producer/writer; Keith Crofford & Mike Lazzo, executive producers; Alexander Bulkley and Corey Campodonico, producers; Tom Root & Douglas Goldstein, head writers; Hugh Davidson, Jordan Allen-Dutton, Mike Fasolo, Dan Milano & Eric Weiner, writers	Adult Swim
2007 (59th)	The Simpsons	"The Haw-Hawed Couple"	Matt Groening, James L. Brooks, Al Jean, Ian Maxtone-Graham & Tim Long, executive producers; John Frink, Don Payne, Dana Gould, Kevin Curran, J. Stewart Burns, Michael Price, Bill Odenkirk, Marc Wilmore & Joel H. Cohen, co-executive producers; Laurie Biernacki & Rick Polizzi, animation producers; Matt Selman, written by; Chris Clements, directed by; Mark Kirkland, supervising director; Matthew Faughnan, assistant director; Scott Brutz, animation timer	Fox
2007 (59th)	SpongeBob SquarePants	"Bummer Vacation" / "Wigstruck"	Stephen Hillenburg, executive producer; Paul Tibbitt, supervising producer; Tom Yasumi, animation director/timer; Alan Smart, supervising director/animation director/timer; Casey Alexander, Chris Mitchell, Luke Brookshier & Tom King, storyboard directors/written by; Dani Michaeli, written by; Andrew Overtoom, timer	Nickelodeon
2007 (59th)	More Than One Hour			
2007 (59th)	Camp Lazlo	"Where's Lazlo?"	Joe Murray, executive producer/story by/written by/directed by; Brian A. Miller, executive producer; Mark O'Hare, supervising producer/story by/written by/directed by; Jennifer Pelphrey, supervising producer; Janet Dimon, producer; Brian Sheesley, supervising director/directed by; Won Dong Kun, animation director; Merriwether Williams, story by; Russell Calabrese, Phil Cummings, Lindsey Pollard & Swinton O. Scott III, timers	Cartoon Network
2007 (59th)	Foster's Home for Imaginary Friends	"Good Wilt Hunting"	Craig McCracken, executive producer/directed by/story by; Brian A. Miller, executive producer; Jennifer Pelphrey, supervising producer; Lauren Faust, supervising producer/written by/story by; Vincent Aniceto, producer; Michelle Papandrew, animation producer; Darrick Bachman & Craig Lewis, story by; Robert Alvarez, Eric Pringle & Robert Cullen, animation direction	Cartoon Network
2007 (59th)	Hellboy Animated: Sword of Storms		Mike Richardson, Lloyd Levin, Stephen Brown, Morris Berger & John W. Hyde, executive producers; Mike Wolf, animation executive producer; Stephanie Elliott, animation producer; Tad Stones, supervising producer/director/story by/screenplay by; Scott Greenberg, Scott Hemming & Sidney Clifton, producers; Phil Weinstein, director; Mike Mignola, story by; Matt Wayne, screenplay by; Gordon Kent & Art Vitello, animation timing directors; Russell Calabrese, Eddy Houchins, Tim Walker & Junja Wolf, timers	Cartoon Network
2007 (59th)	Secrets of the Deep		Tim Haines, Martin Davidson & Gaynelle Evans, executive producers; Kera Rennert, producer; Ceri Barnes, produced by; Nik Sopwith, story by; Jamie Smith, written by; David Allen, directed by; Mike Milne, director of computer animation	Discovery Channel
2008 (60th)	One Hour or Less			
2008 (60th)	The Simpsons	"Eternal Moonshine of the Simpson Mind"	Matt Groening, James L. Brooks, Al Jean, Ian Maxtone-Graham, Matt Selman & Tim Long, executive producers; John Frink, Kevin Curran, Michael Price, Bill Odenkirk, Marc Wilmore, Joel H. Cohen, Ron Hauge & Rob LaZebnik, co-executive producers; Laurie Biernacki & Rick Polizzi, animation producers; J. Stewart Burns, written by; Chuck Sheetz, directed by; Mark Kirkland, supervising director; Jess Española, assistant director; Patty Shinagawa, animation timer	Fox
2008 (60th)	Creature Comforts America	"Don't Choke To Death, Please"	Kit Boss, Miles Bullough, Ellen Goldsmith-Vein, Peter Lord, Nick Park & David Sproxton, executive producers; Peter McHugh, co-executive producer; Jacqueline White, supervising producer; Kenny Micka & Gareth Owen, producers; Merlin Crossingham & Dave Osmand, directors; Richard Goleszowski, supervising director	CBS
2008 (60th)	King of the Hill	"Death Picks Cotton"	Mike Judge, Greg Daniels, Dave Krinsky, Jim Dauterive & Garland Testa, executive producers; John Altschuler, executive producer/writer; Paul Corrigan & Brad Walsh, co-executive producers; Tony Gama-Lobo, Rebecca May, Christy Stratton & Joe Boucher, supervising producers; Mark McJimsey, producer; Malisa Caroselli, animation executive producer; Stephanie Elliott, animation producer; Judah Miller & Murray Miller, writers; Tony Kluck, director; Wes Archer, supervising director; Philippe Angeles, overseas animation director; Jill Jacobs, lead animation timer	Fox
2008 (60th)	Robot Chicken	"Robot Chicken: Star Wars"	Seth Green, executive producer/writer/director; Matthew Senreich, executive producer/writer; Keith Crofford & Mike Lazzo, executive producers; Alexander Bulkley and Corey Campodonico, producers; Tom Root & Douglas Goldstein, head writers; Jordan Allen-Dutton, Mike Fasolo, Charles Horn, Breckin Meyer, Hugh Sterbakov & Eric Weiner, writers; Mark Caballero, animation director	Adult Swim
2008 (60th)	SpongeBob SquarePants	"The Inmates of Summer" / "The Two Faces of Squidward"	Stephen Hillenburg, executive producer; Paul Tibbitt, co-executive producer/supervising producer; Charlie Bean, Aaron Springer & Chris Reccardi, written by/storyboard directors; Steven Banks & Dani Michaeli, written by; Alan Smart, supervising director/animation director; Tom Yasumi, animation director	Nickelodeon
2008 (60th)	More Than One Hour			
2008 (60th)	South Park	"Imaginationland Episode I", "Imaginationland Episode II" & "Imaginationland Episode III"	Trey Parker, executive producer/writer/director; Matt Stone & Anne Garefino, executive producers; Frank C. Agnone II, supervising producer; Eric Stough, Bruce Howell, Adrien Beard, Vernon Chatman, Erica Rivinoja & Pam Brady, producers; Ryan Quincy, director of animation	Comedy Central
2008 (60th)	Family Guy	"Blue Harvest"	Seth MacFarlane, David A. Goodman & Chris Sheridan, executive producers; Danny Smith, Mark Hentemann & Steve Callaghan, co-executive producers; Alec Sulkin, supervising producer/writer; Alex Borstein, Mike Henry & Wellesley Wild, supervising producers; Kara Vallow, producer; Shannon Smith, animation producer; Dominic Polcino, director; Peter Shin, supervising director; Joseph Lee, assistant director; Andi Klein, timing supervisor	Fox
2008 (60th)	Justice League: The New Frontier		Bruce Timm & Sander Schwartz, executive producers; Michael Goguen, supervising producer; Dave Bullock, directed by; Stan Berkowitz, written by; Darwyn Cooke, written by (additional material); James T. Walker, animation timing supervisor	Warner Bros. on Demand
2009 (61st)	One Hour or Less			
2009 (61st)	South Park	"Margaritaville"	Trey Parker, executive producer/writer/director; Matt Stone & Anne Garefino, executive producers; Frank C. Agnone II, supervising producer; Eric Stough, Bruce Howell, Adrien Beard, Vernon Chatman, Erica Rivinoja & Bill Hader, producers; Ryan Quincy, animation producer	Comedy Central
2009 (61st)	American Dad!	"1600 Candles"	Seth MacFarlane, Mike Barker, Matt Weitzman & David Zuckerman, executive producers; Rick Wiener & Kenny Schwartz, executive producers/writers; Michael Shipley, Jim Bernstein & Dan Vebber, co-executive producers; Jonathan Fener, Brian Boyle & Nahnatchka Khan, supervising producers; Kara Vallow, producer; Diana Ritchey, animation producer; Caleb Meurer, director/timer; Ron Hughart & Anthony Lioi, supervising directors; Mike Mayfield, assistant director/timer	Fox
2009 (61st)	Robot Chicken	"Robot Chicken: Star Wars Episode II"	Seth Green, executive producer/written by/directed by; Matthew Senreich, executive producer/written by; Keith Crofford & Mike Lazzo, executive producers; Alexander Bulkley, Corey Campodonico & Ollie Green, producers; Tom Root & Douglas Goldstein, head writers; Hugh Davidson, Mike Fasolo, Breckin Meyer, Dan Milano, Kevin Shinick & Zeb Wells, written by; Ethan Marak, animation director	Adult Swim
2009 (61st)	The Simpsons	"Gone Maggie Gone"	Matt Groening, James L. Brooks, Al Jean & Matt Selman, executive producers; John Frink, Kevin Curran, J. Stewart Burns, Michael Price, Marc Wilmore, Ron Hauge, Rob LaZebnik, Matt Warburton, Brian Kelley & Jeff Westbrook, co-executive producers; Tom Klein, animation producer; Billy Kimball & Ian Maxtone-Graham, written by; Chris Clements, directed by; Mike B. Anderson, supervising director; Matthew Faughnan, assistant director; Scott Brutz, animation timer	Fox
2009 (61st)	More Than One Hour			
2009 (61st)	Foster's Home for Imaginary Friends	"Destination: Imagination"	Craig McCracken, executive producer/story by/directed by; Brian A. Miller, executive producer; Jennifer Pelphrey, supervising producer; Ryan Slater, producer; Michelle Papandrew, animation producer; Lauren Faust & Timothy McKeon, written by/story by; Darrick Bachman, Ed Baker, Vaughn Tada & Alex Kirwan, story by; Rob Renzetti, story by/directed by; Robert Alvarez & Eric Pringle, animation direction	Cartoon Network
2009 (61st)	Afro Samurai: Resurrection		Leo Chu & Eric Garcia, executive producers/screenplay by; Shinichiro Ishikawa, Samuel L. Jackson & Arthur Smith, executive producers; Yûji Hori & Kenichi Hayashi, animation producers; Takashi Okazaki, story by; Yasuyuki Muto, Joshua Hale Fialkov & Eric S. Calderon, screenplay by; Fuminori Kizaki, animation direction/story by	Spike

=== 2010s ===
Year	Program	Episode	Nominees	Network
2010 (62nd)
2010 (62nd)	Prep & Landing		Chris Williams, executive producer/story by; John Lasseter, executive producer; Dorothy McKim, producer; Stevie Wermers & Kevin Deters, writers/directors	ABC
2010 (62nd)	Alien Earths		Howard B. Swartz, executive producer; Dana Berry, produced/directed/written by; Steven Reich & Ray Villard, written by; Jason Hearne & Dave Jerrard, animation directors	Nat Geo
2010 (62nd)	The Ricky Gervais Show	"Knob at Night"	Ricky Gervais, Stephen Merchant, Karl Pilkington, Glyn Hughes & Bob Higgins, executive producers; Lisa Ullmann, co-executive producer; Margaret M. Dean, supervising producer; Michelle Papandrew, producer; Craig Kellman, directed by; Nick Bertonazzi, animation director	HBO
2010 (62nd)	The Simpsons	"Once Upon a Time in Springfield"	Matt Groening, James L. Brooks, Al Jean & Matt Selman, executive producers; John Frink, Kevin Curran, J. Stewart Burns, Michael Price, Marc Wilmore, Joel H. Cohen, Ron Hauge, Rob LaZebnik & Matt Warburton, co-executive producers; Jeff Westbrook & Brian Kelley, co-executive producers; Tom Klein, animation producer; Mike B. Anderson, supervising director; Oscar Cervantes & Davy Lauterbach, assistant directors; Matthew Nastuk, directed by; Stephanie Gillis, written by	Fox
2010 (62nd)	South Park	"200" / "201"	Trey Parker, executive producer/writer/director; Matt Stone & Anne Garefino, executive producers; Frank C. Agnone II, supervising producer; Eric Stough, Bruce Howell, Adrien Beard, Vernon Chatman & Erica Rivinoja, producers; Ryan Quincy, animation producer; Jack Shih & Jenny Yu, directors of animation	Comedy Central
2011 (63rd)
2011 (63rd)	Futurama	"The Late Philip J. Fry"	Matt Groening, David X. Cohen & Ken Keeler, executive producers; Eric Horsted, Michael Rowe, Josh Weinstein, Patric Verrone & Dan Vebber, co-executive producers; Gregg Vanzo, animation executive producer; Claudia Katz & Lee Supercinski, produced by; Peter Avanzino, supervising director/directed by; Lew Morton, written by; Ira Sherak, assistant director; Scott Vanzo, director of computer graphics	Comedy Central
2011 (63rd)	The Cleveland Show	"Murray Christmas"	Seth MacFarlane, Richard Appel & Mike Henry, executive producers; Kirker Butler, co-executive producer/writer; Jonathan Green & Gabe Miller, supervising producers; Aseem Batra, Clarence Livingston & Kara Vallow, producers; Brandi Young, animation producer; Ken Wong, director; Albert Calleros & Anthony Lioi, supervising directors; Max Martinez, assistant director; Doug Gallery & Maureen Mlynarczyk, timing supervisors; Eric Bryan, Patrick Buchanan, Jamie H. Huang & Tom Pope, animation timers	Fox
2011 (63rd)	Robot Chicken	"Robot Chicken: Star Wars Episode III"	Seth Green & Matthew Senreich, executive producers/written by; Keith Crofford & Mike Lazzo, executive producers; Tom Root & Douglas Goldstein, co-executive producers/head writers; Alexander Bulkley, Corey Campodonico & Ollie Green, producers; Matthew Ireland Beans, Hugh Davidson, Dan Milano, Mike Fasolo, Geoff Johns, Hugh Sterbakov, Breckin Meyer, Kevin Shinick & Zeb Wells, written by; Chris McKay, directed by; Savelen Forrest, animation director	Adult Swim
2011 (63rd)	The Simpsons	"Angry Dad: The Movie"	Matt Groening, James L. Brooks, Al Jean and Matt Selman, executive producers; John Frink, executive producer/written by; Kevin Curran, J. Stewart Burns, Michael Price, Bill Odenkirk, Marc Wilmore, Joel H. Cohen, Rob LaZebnik, Matt Warburton, Jeff Westbrook and Brian Kelley, co-executive producers; Larina Jean Adamson, supervising producer; Tom Klein, animation producer; Matthew Nastuk, directed by; Mike B. Anderson, supervising director; Alex Ruiz, assistant director; Sam Im, lead animation timer	Fox
2011 (63rd)	South Park	"Crack Baby Athletic Association"	Trey Parker, executive producer/writer/director; Matt Stone & Anne Garefino, executive producers; Frank C. Agnone II, supervising producer; Eric Stough, Bruce Howell, Adrien Beard, Vernon Chatman & Bill Hader, producers; Ryan Quincy, animation producers; Jack Shih & Jenny Yu, directors of animation	Comedy Central
2012 (64th)
2012 (64th)	The Penguins of Madagascar	"The Return of the Revenge of Dr. Blowhole"	Bob Schooley & Mark McCorkle, executive producers/written by; Bret Haaland, co-executive producer; Nicholas Filippi, Chris Neuhahn & Ant Ward, supervising producers; Andrew Huebner, producer; Dave Knott, supervising director; Shaun Cashman, Steve Loter & Christo Stamboliev, animation directors	Nickelodeon
2012 (64th)	American Dad!	"Hot Water"	Seth MacFarlane, Mike Barker, Matt Weitzman, Rick Wiener, Kenny Schwartz & Nahnatchka Khan, executive producers; Jonathan Fener & Brian Boyle, co-executive producers; Murray Miller & Judah Miller, co-executive producers/writers; Erik Sommers, supervising producer; Kara Vallow, Laura McCreary & Erik Durbin, producers; Diana Ritchey, animation producer; Chris Bennett, director; Ron Hughart & Brent Woods, supervising directors; Ralph Fernan, assistant director; David Bastian & Bill Buchanan, timing supervisors	Fox
2012 (64th)	Bob's Burgers	"Burgerboss"	Loren Bouchard & Jim Dauterive, executive producers; Kit Boss, co-executive producer; Dan Fybel & Rich Rinaldi, supervising producers; Mark McJimsey, animation executive producer/supervising producer; Jon Schroeder, producer; Joel Kuwahara & Scott D. Greenberg, animation executive producers; Malisa Caroselli & Janelle Momary, animation producers; Scott Jacobson, written by; Jennifer Coyle, director; Randy Ludensky, animation timing supervisor	Fox
2012 (64th)	Futurama	"The Tip of the Zoidberg"	Matt Groening & David X. Cohen, executive producers; Ken Keeler, executive producer/writer; Patric Verrone, Josh Weinstein, Eric Horsted, Michael Rowe & Dan Vebber, co-executive producers; Lee Supercinski & Claudia Katz, producers; Gregg Vanzo, animation executive producer; Peter Avanzino, supervising director; Raymie Muzquiz, director; Aldin Baroza, assistant director; Scott Vanzo, director of computer graphics	Comedy Central
2012 (64th)	The Simpsons	"Holidays of Future Passed"	Matt Groening, James L. Brooks, Al Jean, Matt Selman & John Frink, executive producers; J. Stewart Burns, co-executive producer/written by; Kevin Curran, Michael Price, Bill Odenkirk, Marc Wilmore, Joel H. Cohen, Rob LaZebnik, Matt Warburton, Jeff Westbrook & Brian Kelley, co-executive producers; Larina Jean Adamson, supervising producer; Tom Klein, animation producer; Mike B. Anderson, supervising director; Rob Oliver, director; Richard Manginsay, assistant director; Sam Im, lead animation timer	Fox
2013 (65th)
2013 (65th)	South Park	"Raising the Bar"	Trey Parker, executive producer/written by/directed by; Matt Stone & Anne Garefino, executive producers; Frank C. Agnone II, supervising producer; Eric Stough, Bruce Howell, Adrien Beard & Vernon Chatman, producers; Jack Shih & Jenny Yu, directors of animation	Comedy Central
2013 (65th)	Bob's Burgers	"O.T.: The Outside Toilet"	Loren Bouchard & Jim Dauterive, executive producers; Joel Kuwahara, Scott D. Greenberg & Mark McJimsey, animation executive producers; Kit Boss, Dan Fybel, Rich Rinaldi, Gregory Thompson & Jon Schroeder, co-executive producers; Nora Smith, producer; Janelle Momary, animation producer; Lizzie Molyneux & Wendy Molyneux, written by; Bernard Derriman, supervising director; Anthony Chun, director; Randy Ludensky, animation timing supervisor	Fox
2013 (65th)	Kung Fu Panda: Legends of Awesomeness	"Enter the Dragon"	Peter Hastings, executive producer/written by; Bret Haaland, co-executive producer; Kyoung Joon Hwang, animation executive producer; Randy Dormans & Gabe Swarr, supervising producers; Andrew Huebner, produced by; Scott Kreamer, written by; Gene Grillo & Douglas Langdale, writers; Aaron Hammersley & Michael Mullen, directed by	Nickelodeon
2013 (65th)	Regular Show	"The Christmas Special"	J. G. Quintel, executive producer/writer/directed by; Brian A. Miller, Jennifer Pelphrey, Curtis Lelash & Rob Sorcher, executive producers; Mike Roth, supervising producer/writer/directed by; Ryan Slater, producer; Sean Szeles, Kat Morris, Benton Connor & Hilary Florido, written by; Matt Price & Michele Cavin, writers; John Davis Infantino, writer/supervising director; Robert Alvarez, animation director; Gi-ho Hwang & Yu-Seong Kim, overseas directors	Cartoon Network
2013 (65th)	The Simpsons	"Treehouse of Horror XXIII"	Matt Groening, James L. Brooks, Al Jean, Matt Selman & John Frink, executive producers; Kevin Curran, J. Stewart Burns, Michael Price, Bill Odenkirk, Marc Wilmore, Joel H. Cohen, Rob LaZebnik, Matt Warburton & Jeff Westbrook, co-executive producers; Tom Klein, animation producer; Mike B. Anderson, supervising director; Peter Gomez, assistant director; Richard Gasparian, lead animation timer; Steven Dean Moore, directed by; David Mandel & Brian Kelley, written by	Fox
2014 (66th)
2014 (66th)	Bob's Burgers	"Mazel-Tina"	Loren Bouchard and Jim Dauterive, executive producers; Dan Fybel, Rich Rinaldi, Gregory Thompson & Jon Schroeder, co-executive producers; Mark McJimsey, supervising producer/animation executive producer; Nora Smith, supervising producer; Scott Jacobson, producer; Joel Kuwahara & Scott D. Greenberg, animation executive producers; Janelle Momary, animation producer; Holly Schlesinger, written by; Brian LoSchiavo, director; Bernard Derriman, supervising director; Randy Ludensky, animation timing supervisor	Fox
2014 (66th)	Archer	"Archer Vice: The Rules of Extraction"	Adam Reed, executive producer/written by; Matt Thompson, executive producer; Bryan Fordney, producer/animation director; Neal Holman, Eric Sims and Casey Willis, producers	FX
2014 (66th)	Futurama	"Meanwhile"	Matt Groening, David X. Cohen & Ken Keeler, executive producers; Josh Weinstein, executive producer/written by; Eric Horsted, Dan Vebber, Michael Rowe & Patric Verrone, co-executive producers; Lee Supercinski & Claudia Katz, producers; Gregg Vanzo, animation executive producer; Scott Vanzo, director of computer graphics; Peter Avanzino, supervising director/directed by; David D. Au, assistant director	Comedy Central
2014 (66th)	South Park	"Black Friday"	Trey Parker, executive producer/written by/directed by; Matt Stone, Anne Garefino & Frank C. Agnone II, executive producers; Eric Stough, Bruce Howell, Adrien Beard, Vernon Chatman & Bill Hader, producers; Jack Shih & Jenny Yu, directors of animation	Comedy Central
2014 (66th)	Teenage Mutant Ninja Turtles	"The Manhattan Project"	Peter Hastings, executive producer; Ciro Nieli, executive producer/supervising director; Ant Ward, supervising producer; MacGregor Middleton, producer; Brandon Auman & John Shirley, written by; Michael Chang & Alan Wan, directed by	Nickelodeon
2015 (67th)
2015 (67th)	Over the Garden Wall		Patrick McHale, executive producer/story by; Rob Sorcher, Curtis Lelash, Brian A. Miller & Jennifer Pelphrey, executive producers; Pernelle Hayes, producer; Amalia Levari & Tom Herpich, story by; Bert Youn, written by; Robert Alvarez, Larry Leichliter, Eddy Houchins & Ken Bruce, animation directors	Cartoon Network
2015 (67th)	Archer	"Pocket Listing"	Adam Reed, executive producer/writer; Matt Thompson, executive producer; Casey Willis, co-executive producer; Bryan Fordney, producer/animation director; Neal Holman & Eric Sims, producers	FX
2015 (67th)	Bob's Burgers	"Can't Buy Me Math"	Loren Bouchard & Jim Dauterive, executive producers; Dan Fybel, co-executive producer/written by; Rich Rinaldi, Gregory Thompson & Jon Schroeder, co-executive producers; Mark McJimsey, supervising producer/animation executive producer; Nora Smith, supervising producer; Scott Jacobson, Steven Davis, Kelvin Yu, Lizzie Molyneux, Wendy Molyneux & Holly Schlesinger, producers; Scott D. Greenberg & Joel Kuwahara, animation executive producers; Janelle Momary, animation producer; Tyree Dillihay, director; Bernard Derriman, supervising director; Gordon Kent, animation timing	Fox
2015 (67th)	The Simpsons	"Treehouse of Horror XXV"	Matt Groening, James L. Brooks, Al Jean, Matt Selman & John Frink, executive producers; Kevin Curran, J. Stewart Burns, Michael Price, Bill Odenkirk, Marc Wilmore, Joel H. Cohen, Rob LaZebnik, Jeff Westbrook & Brian Kelley, co-executive producers; Larina Jean Adamson, supervising producer; Tom Klein, animation producer; Stephanie Gillis, written by; Matthew Faughnan, directed by; Mike B. Anderson, supervising director; Chris Clements, assistant director; Scott Brutz, lead animation timer	Fox
2015 (67th)	South Park	"Freemium Isn't Free"	Trey Parker, executive producer/directed by; Matt Stone, Anne Garefino & Frank C. Agnone II, executive producers; Eric Stough, Bruce Howell, Adrien Beard, Vernon Chatman & Bill Hader, producers; Jack Shih, animation producer; Jenny Yu, director of animation	Comedy Central
2016 (68th)
2016 (68th)	Archer	"The Figgis Agency"	Adam Reed, executive producer/writer; Matt Thompson, executive producer; Casey Willis, co-executive producer; Jeff Fastner, Neal Holman, Chad Hurd & Eric Sims, producers; Bryan Fordney, producer/animation director	FX
2016 (68th)	Bob's Burgers	"The Horse Rider-er"	Loren Bouchard, Jim Dauterive, Dan Fybel & Rich Rinaldi, executive producers; Gregory Thompson, Jon Schroeder & Scott Jacobson, co-executive producers; Nora Smith, co-executive producer/written by; Steven Davis, Kelvin Yu, Lizzie Molyneux, Wendy Molyneux & Holly Schlesinger, supervising producers; Joel Kuwahara & Scott D. Greenberg, animation executive producers; Janelle Momary, produced by; Bernard Derriman, supervising director; Tyree Dillihay, director; Mauricio Pardo, assistant director	Fox
2016 (68th)	Phineas and Ferb	"Last Day of Summer"	Dan Povenmire & Jeff "Swampy" Marsh, executive producers; Robert F. Hughes, producer/directed by; Danielle Vetere, Scott D. Peterson, Jim Bernstein & Martin Olson, story by; Aliki Theofilopoulos, Bernie Petterson, Calvin Suggs, John Mathot, Joshua Pruett, Kaz, Kim Roberson & Michael Diederich, written by; Sue Perrotto, directed by; Russell Calabrese & Derek Lee Thompson, assistant directors	Disney XD
2016 (68th)	The Simpsons	"Halloween of Horror"	Matt Groening, James L. Brooks, Al Jean, Matt Selman & John Frink, executive producers; Kevin Curran, J. Stewart Burns, Michael Price, Bill Odenkirk, Marc Wilmore, Joel H. Cohen, Rob LaZebnik, Jeff Westbrook & Brian Kelley, co-executive producers; Larina Jean Adamson, supervising producer; Tom Klein, animation producer; Carolyn Omine, written by; Mike B. Anderson, directed by; Jennifer Moeller & Norman Auble, assistant directors; Robert Ingram, lead animation timer	Fox
2016 (68th)	South Park	"You're Not Yelping"	Trey Parker, executive producer/directed by; Matt Stone, Anne Garefino & Frank C. Agnone II, executive producers; Vernon Chatman, Eric Stough, Adrien Beard & Bruce Howell, producers; Jack Shih, animation producer; Jenny Yu, director of animation	Comedy Central
2017 (69th)
2017 (69th)	Bob's Burgers	"Bob Actually"	Loren Bouchard, Jim Dauterive, Dan Fybel & Rich Rinaldi, executive producers; Gregory Thompson, Jon Schroeder, Nora Smith, & Scott Jacobson, co-executive producers; Steven Davis & Kelvin Yu, supervising producers/writers; Lizzie Molyneux, Wendy Molyneux, & Holly Schlesinger, supervising producers; Janelle Momary-Neely, produced by; Joel Kuwahara & Scott D. Greenberg, animation executive producers; Bernard Derriman, supervising director	Fox
2017 (69th)	Archer	"Archer Dreamland: No Good Deed"	Adam Reed, executive producer/writer; Matt Thompson, executive producer; Casey Willis, co-executive producer; Jeff Fastner, Bryan Fordney, Neal Holman, Chad Hurd & Eric Sims, producers; Marcus Rosentrater, animation director	FX
2017 (69th)	The Simpsons	"The Town"	Matt Groening, James L. Brooks, Al Jean, Matt Selman & John Frink, executive producers; J. Stewart Burns, Michael Price, Bill Odenkirk, Joel H. Cohen, Rob LaZebnik, Jeff Westbrook, Brian Kelley & Dan Vebber, co-executive producers; Larina Jean Adamson & Ryan Koh, supervising producer; Tom Klein, animation producer; Mike B. Anderson, supervising director; Eddie Rosas, assistant director; Carlton Batten, lead animation timer; Rob Oliver, directed by; Dave King, written by	Fox
2017 (69th)	Sofia the First	"Elena and the Secret of Avalor"	Jamie Mitchell, executive producer/director; Craig Gerber, executive producer/written by	Disney Channel
2017 (69th)	South Park	"Member Berries"	Trey Parker, executive producer/directed by; Matt Stone, Anne Garefino & Frank C. Agnone II, executive producers; Eric Stough, Bruce Howell, Adrien Beard, Vernon Chatman, & Bill Hader, producers; Jack Shih, animation producer; Jenny Yu, director of animation	Comedy Central
2018 (70th)
2018 (70th)	Rick and Morty	"Pickle Rick"	Justin Roiland, Dan Harmon, Delna Bhesania, Barry Ward, Keith Crofford & Mike Lazzo, executive producers; Ryan Ridley & Dan Guterman, co-executive producers; Mike McMahan, supervising producer; Tom Kauffman & Ollie Green, producers; J. Michael Mendel, producer; Jessica Gao, written by; Wes Archer, supervising director; Anthony Chun, director; Nathan Litz, animation director	Adult Swim
2018 (70th)	Big Hero 6: The Series	"Baymax Returns"	Mark McCorkle & Bob Schooley, executive producers; Nick Filippi, executive producer/supervising director; Sharon Flynn & Paiman Kalayeh, written by; Stephen Heneveld & Ben Juwono, directed by; Jill Jacobs, Helen Roh & Jungja Wolf, timing directors	Disney XD
2018 (70th)	Bob's Burgers	"V for Valentine-detta"	Loren Bouchard, Jim Dauterive, Dan Fybel, Rich Rinaldi, Nora Smith, Gregory Thompson & Jon Schroeder, executive producers; Scott Jacobson & Holly Schlesinger, co-executive producer; Lizzie Molyneux & Wendy Molyneux, co-executive producers/written by; Steven Davis, Kelvin Yu & Janelle Momary-Neely, supervising producers; Scott Greenberg, animation executive producer; Mike Penketh, animation producer; Ian Hamilton, director; Bernard Derriman, supervising director; Tony Gennaro, assistant supervising director	Fox
2018 (70th)	The Simpsons	"Gone Boy"	Matt Groening, James L. Brooks, Al Jean & Matt Selman, executive producers; J. Stewart Burns, Michael Price, Bill Odenkirk, Joel H. Cohen, Rob LaZebnik, Jeff Westbrook, Brian Kelley, Dan Vebber & Ryan Koh, co-executive producers; Richard K. Chung, producer; Tom Klein and Andrea Romero, animation producers; Mike B. Anderson, supervising director; Eddie Rosas, animation director; Sam Im, lead animation timer; Rob Oliver, directed by; John Frink, written by	Fox
2018 (70th)	South Park	"Put It Down"	Trey Parker, executive producer/directed by; Matt Stone, Anne Garefino & Frank C. Agnone II, executive producers; Eric Stough, Adrien Beard, Bruce Howell & Vernon Chatman, producers; Jack Shih, animation producer; Jenny Yu, director of animation	Comedy Central
2019 (71st)
2019 (71st)	The Simpsons	"Mad About the Toy"	Matt Groening, James L. Brooks, Al Jean, Matt Selman and John Frink, executive producers; J. Stewart Burns, Bill Odenkirk, Joel H. Cohen, Rob LaZebnik, Jeff Westbrook, Brian Kelley, Dan Vebber and Ryan Koh, co-executive producers; Richard Raynis, produced by; Tom Klein and Andrea Romero, animation producers; Mike B. Anderson, supervising director; Michael Price, written by; Rob Oliver, directed by; Eddie Rosas, assistant director; Carlton Batten, lead animation timer	Fox
2019 (71st)	Adventure Time	"Come Along with Me"	Pendleton Ward and Adam Muto, executive producers/story by; Rob Sorcher, Brian A. Miller and Jennifer Pelphrey, executive producers; Conrad Montgomery, co-executive producer; Kelly Crews, supervising producer; Keith Mack, producer; Tom Herpich and Steve Wolfhard, written by/story by; Somvilay Xayaphone, Seo Kim, Aleks Sennwald, Hanna K. Nystrom and Graham Falk, written by; Kent Osborne, Jack Pendarvis and Julia Pott, story by; Cole Sanchez and Diana Lafyatis, supervising directors; Lindsey Pollard, animation director	Cartoon Network
2019 (71st)	Big Mouth	"The Planned Parenthood Show"	Nick Kroll, Andrew Goldberg, Mark J. Levin and Jennifer Flackett, executive producers; Joe Wengert, Ben Kalina, Chris Prynoski, Shannon Prynoski and Anthony Lioi, supervising producers; Gil Ozeri and Kelly Galuska, producers; Nate Funaro, produced by; Emily Altman, written by; Bryan Francis, directed by; Mike L. Mayfield, co-supervising director; Jerilyn Blair, Bill Buchanan, Sean Dempsey and Jamie Huang, animation timers	Netflix
2019 (71st)	Bob's Burgers	"Just One of the Boyz 4 Now for Now"	Loren Bouchard, Jim Dauterive, Dan Fybel, Rich Rinaldi, Jon Schroeder, Nora Smith and Gregory Thompson, executive producers; Steven Davis, Scott Jacobson, Holly Schlesinger and Kelvin Yu, co-executive producers; Lizzie Molyneux and Wendy Molyneux, co-executive producers/writers; Janelle Momary-Neely, supervising producer; Joel Kuwahara and Scott Greenberg, animation executive producers; Mike Penketh, animation producer; Ian Hamilton, director; Bernard Derriman and Tony Gennaro, supervising director; Doug Gallery, timing supervisor	Fox
2019 (71st)	BoJack Horseman	"Free Churro"	Raphael Bob-Waksberg, executive producer/written by; Noel Bright, Steven A. Cohen, Will Arnett and Aaron Paul, executive producers; Peter A. Knight, Elijah Aron and Kate Purdy, co-executive producers; Lisa Hanawalt and Joanna Calo, supervising producers; Kelly Galuska, Nick Adams, Alex Bulkley, Corey Campodonico and Richard Choi, producers; Mike Hollingsworth, producer/supervising director; Amy Winfrey, directed by; Peter Merryman, assistant director; Anne Walker Farrell and Adam Parton, animation directors	Netflix

=== 2020s ===
Year	Program	Episode	Nominees	Network
2020 (72nd)
2020 (72nd)	Rick and Morty	"The Vat of Acid Episode"	Dan Harmon, Justin Roiland, Mike McMahan, Scott Marder, Keith Crofford, Rick Mischel, Richard Grieve and Mike Lazzo, executive producers; Rob Schrab, co-executive producer; James Siciliano, supervising producer; Wes Archer, supervising director; Michael Waldron, Nick Rutherford, Lee Harting and Ollie Green, producers; Sydney Ryan and J. Michael Mendel, produced by; Jacob Hair, directed by; Nathan Litz, director; Jeff Loveness, written by/supervising producer; Albro Lundy, written by	Adult Swim
2020 (72nd)	Big Mouth	"Disclosure The Movie: The Musical!"	Nick Kroll, Andrew Goldberg, Mark Levin and Jennifer Flackett, executive producers; Joe Wengert, co-executive producer; Kelly Galuska, Gil Ozeri, Ben Kalina, Shannon Prynoski, Chris Prynoski and Anthony Lioi, supervising producers; Mike L. Mayfield, co-supervising director; Nate Funaro, produced by; Emily Altman, producer/writer; Victor Quinaz, writer; Bob Suarez, director; David Bastian, Edgar Larrazabal, Maureen Mlynarczyk and Juli Murphy, animation timers	Netflix
2020 (72nd)	Bob's Burgers	"Pig Trouble in Little Tina"	Loren Bouchard, Jim Dauterive, Dan Fybel, Rich Rinaldi, Jon Schroeder and Greg Thompson, executive producers; Nora Smith, executive producer/written by; Steven Davis, Scott Jacobson, Lizzie Molyneux-Logelin, Wendy Molyneux, Holly Schlesinger and Kelvin Yu, co-executive producers; Janelle Momary-Neely, supervising producer; Bernard Derriman and Tony Gennaro, supervising directors; Chris Song, director; Scott Greenberg and Joel Kuwahara, animation executive producers; Mike Penketh, animation producer; Doug Gallery, timing supervisor	Fox
2020 (72nd)	BoJack Horseman	"The View from Halfway Down"	Raphael Bob-Waksberg, Noel Bright, Steven A. Cohen, Will Arnett and Aaron Paul, executive producers; Joanna Calo and Lisa Hanawalt, co-executive producers; Mike Hollingsworth, co-executive producer/supervising director; Nick Adams and Shauna McGarry, supervising producers; Alex Bulkley, Corey Campodonico, Eric Blyler and Richard Choi, producers; Amy Winfrey, directed by; Alison Tafel, written by; Christopher Nance, assistant director; Yair Gordon and Karl Pajak, animation directors	Netflix
2020 (72nd)	The Simpsons	"Thanksgiving of Horror"	James L. Brooks, Matt Groening, Al Jean, Matt Selman and John Frink, executive producers; J. Stewart Burns, Michael Price, Bill Odenkirk, Joel H. Cohen, Rob LaZebnik, Jeff Westbrook, Brian Kelley and Ryan Koh, co-executive producers; Richard K. Chung, producer; Rob Oliver, directed by; Mike B. Anderson, supervising director; Dane Romley, assistant director; Dan Vebber, written by; Tom Klein and Andrea Romero, animation producers; Carlton Batten, lead animation timer	Fox
2021 (73rd)
2021 (73rd)	Genndy Tartakovsky's Primal	"Plague of Madness"	Genndy Tartakovsky, executive producer/directed by; Brian A. Miller, Jennifer Pelphrey, Keith Crofford, Mike Lazzo, Oussama Bouacheria, Julien Chheng, Ulysse Malassagne and Erika Forzy, executive producers; Shareena Carlson, supervising producer; Darrick Bachman, head writer; David Krentz, written by/story by; Bryan Andrews, story by	Adult Swim
2021 (73rd)	Big Mouth	"The New Me"	Nick Kroll, Mark Levin and Jennifer Flackett, executive producers; Andrew Goldberg, executive producer/teleplay by/story by; Joe Wengert, Kelly Galuska and Gil Ozeri, co-executive producers; Emily Altman, Ben Kalina, Chris Prynoski, Shannon Prynoski and Anthony Lioi, supervising producers; Victor Quinaz and Abe Forman-Greenwald, producers; Nate Funaro, produced by; Patti Harrison, story by; Andres Salaff, directed by; Chris Ybarra, assistant director	Netflix
2021 (73rd)	Bob's Burgers	"Worms of In-Rear-ment"	Loren Bouchard, Jim Dauterive, Dan Fybel, Rich Rinaldi, Jon Schroeder and Greg Thompson, executive producers; Nora Smith, executive producer/written by; Steven Davis, Scott Jacobson, Holly Schlesinger, Lizzie Molyneux-Logelin, Wendy Molyneux and Kelvin Yu, co-executive producers; Janelle Momary-Neely, supervising producer; Scott Greenberg and Joel Kuwahara, animation executive producers; Michael Penketh, animation producer; Chris Song, directed by; Bernard Derriman and Tony Gennaro, supervising directors; Doug Gallery, timing supervisor	Fox
2021 (73rd)	The Simpsons	"The Dad-Feelings Limited"	James L. Brooks, Matt Groening, Al Jean, Matt Selman and John Frink, executive producers; J. Stewart Burns, Michael Price, Joel H. Cohen, Rob LaZebnik, Jeff Westbrook, Brian Kelley, Dan Vebber and Christine Nangle, co-executive producers; Richard Sakai, produced by; Richard K. Chung, producer; Tom Klein, animation producer; Mike B. Anderson, supervising director, Matthew Faughnan, assistant director; Scott Brutz, lead animation timer; Chris Clements, directed by; Ryan Koh, written by	Fox
2021 (73rd)	South Park	"The Pandemic Special"	Trey Parker, executive producer/directed by; Matt Stone, Anne Garefino and Frank C. Agnone II, executive producers; Eric Stough, Bruce Howell, Adrien Beard, Vernon Chatman, Jack Shih, Daryl Sancton, Giancarlo Ganziano, John Hansen, David List, Mark Munley, Nate Pellettieri, Greg Postma, Lydia Quidilla, Wonnie Ro, Jenny Shin and Keo Thongkham, producers	Comedy Central
2022 (74th)
2022 (74th)	Arcane	"When These Walls Come Tumbling Down"	Christian Linke, executive producer/story by; Marc Merrill, Brandon Beck, Jane Chung and Thomas Vu, executive producers; Jerôme Combe and Melinda Wunsch Dilger, co-executive producers; Pascal Charrue and Arnaud Delord, co-executive producers/directed by; Alex Yee, co-executive producer/written by/story by; Ash Brannon, co-executive producer/story by; Conor Sheehy, story by; Barthelemy Maunoury, animation director; David Lyerly, voice director	Netflix
2022 (74th)	Bob's Burgers	"Some Like It Bot Part 1: Eighth Grade Runner"	Loren Bouchard and Nora Smith, executive producers/written by; Janelle Momary-Neely, Dan Fybel, Rich Rinaldi, Jon Schroeder, Steven Davis, Scott Jacobson, Holly Schlesinger, Lizzie Molyneux-Logelin, Wendy Molyneux and Kelvin Yu, executive producers; Jameel Saleem, supervising producer; Bernard Derriman, producer; Joel Kuwahara and Scott Greenberg, animation executive producers; Simon Chong, directed by; Karen Hydendahl, assistant director; Tony Gennaro, supervising director; Patrick Gleeson, timing supervisor	Fox
2022 (74th)	Rick and Morty	"Mort Dinner Rick Andre"	Dan Harmon, Justin Roiland, Scott Marder, Keith Crofford, Ollie Green, Walter Newman and Richard Grieve, executive producers; Rob Schrab, co-executive producer; James Siciliano, supervising producer; Jeff Loveness, supervising producer/written by; Sydney Ryan and J. Michael Mendel, produced by; Anne Lane, Albro Lundy, Nick Rutherford, Steve Levy, Lee Harting and David Marshall, producers; Jacob Hair, directed by; Nathan Litz, director; Wes Archer, supervising director	Adult Swim
2022 (74th)	The Simpsons	"Pixelated and Afraid"	James L. Brooks, Matt Groening, Al Jean and Matt Selman, executive producers; John Frink, executive producer/written by; Carolyn Omine, Tim Long, Rob LaZebnik, Brian Kelley, Michael Price, Jeff Westbrook, Dan Vebber, Ryan Koh, Elisabeth Kiernan Averick and Christine Nangle, co-executive producers; Richard K. Chung, producer; Tom Klein, animation producer; Chris Clements, directed by; Matthew Faughnan, assistant director; Mike B. Anderson, supervising director; Scott Brutz, lead animation timer	Fox
2022 (74th)	What If...?	"What If... Doctor Strange Lost His Heart Instead of His Hands?"	Brad Winderbaum, Kevin Feige, Victoria Alonso and Louis D'Esposito, executive producers; Bryan Andrews, executive producer/directed by; A. C. Bradley, executive producer/written by; Carrie Wassenaar, producer	Disney+
2023 (75th)
2023 (75th)	The Simpsons	"Treehouse of Horror XXXIII"	James L. Brooks, Matt Groening, Al Jean and John Frink, executive producers; Matt Selman, executive producer/written by; Carolyn Omine and Ryan Koh, co-executive producers/written by; Tim Long, Rob LaZebnik, Joel H. Cohen, Brian Kelley, Michael Price, Dan Vebber and Christine Nangle, co-executive producers; Richard K. Chung, producer; Richard Raynis, produced by; Tom Klein, animation producer; Mike B. Anderson, supervising director; Rob Oliver, directed by; Dane Romley, assistant director; Carlton Batten, lead animation timer	Fox
2023 (75th)	Bob's Burgers	"The Plight Before Christmas"	Loren Bouchard, executive producer/teleplay by; Nora Smith, Janelle Momary-Neely, Dan Fybel, Rich Rinaldi, Jon Schroeder, Steven Davis, Scott Jacobson, Holly Schlesinger, Lizzie Molyneux-Logelin and Wendy Molyneux, executive producers; Kelvin Yu, executive producer/story by; Jameel Saleem, co-executive producer; Lindsey Stoddart, supervising producer; Katie Crown and Bernard Derriman, producers; Joel Kuwahara and Scott Greenberg, animation executive producers; Tony Gennaro and Simon Chong, supervising directors; Chris Song, directed by	Fox
2023 (75th)	Entergalactic		Kenya Barris, Karina Manashil and Dennis Cummings, executive producers; Fletcher Moules, executive producer/directed by; Scott Mescudi, executive producer/story by; Maurice Williams and Ian Edelman, executive producers/written by; Michael Penketh, produced by; Mike Moon and Lauren Siller, producers; Esa Lewis, Sidney Schleiff and Judnick Mayard, written by; Kapil Sharma, animation director	Netflix
2023 (75th)	Primal	"Shadow of Fate"	Genndy Tartakovsky, executive producer/director; Mike Lazzo, Keith Crofford, Brian A. Miller, Jennifer Pelphrey, Oussama Bouacheria, Julien Chheng, Ulysse Malassagne and Erika Forzy, executive producers; Shareena Carlson, supervising producer; Darrick Bachman, head writer/story; David Krentz, written by	Adult Swim
2023 (75th)	Rick and Morty	"Night Family"	Dan Harmon, Justin Roiland, Scott Marder, Ollie Green and Walter Newman, executive producers; Heather Anne Campbell, Steve Levy, Albro Lundy, Alex Rubens, Nick Rutherford and James Siciliano, co-executive producers; Rob Schrab, co-executive producer/written by; Sydney Ryan, produced by; Anne Lane, Deirdre Brenner, Lee Harting and Jonathan Roig, producers; Monica Mitchell, supervising producer; Jacob Hair, directed by; Nathan Litz, director; Wes Archer, supervising director	Adult Swim
2024 (76th)
2024 (76th)	Blue Eye Samurai	"The Tale of the Ronin and the Bride"	Michael Green, executive producer/directed by; Amber Noizumi, executive producer/written by; Erwin Stoff, executive producer; Jane Wu, supervising director/producer; Nick Read, producer; Michael Greenholt, animation director	Netflix
2024 (76th)	Bob's Burgers	"The Amazing Rudy"	Loren Bouchard, Nora Smith, Janelle Momary-Neely, Dan Fybel, Rich Rinaldi, Jon Schroeder, Steven Davis, Scott Jacobson and Holly Schlesinger, executive producers; Jameel Saleem and Lindsey Stoddart, co-executive producers; Katie Crown, supervising producer; Bernard Derriman, producer; Brett Coker, animation executive producer; Lizzie Molyneux-Logelin and Wendy Molyneux, written by; Tony Gennaro and Simon Chong, supervising directors; Ryan Mattos, directed by	Fox
2024 (76th)	Scavengers Reign	"The Signal"	Joseph Bennett and Charles Huettner, executive producer/directed by/written by; Chris Prynoski, Ben Kalina and Antonio Canobbio, executive producers; Sean Buckelew and James Merrill, co-executive producer/written by; Benjy Brooke and Cho Junsik, supervising directors; Kim Hyeongtae, animation director; Bae Ki-Yong, director	Max
2024 (76th)	The Simpsons	"Night of the Living Wage"	James L. Brooks, Al Jean, Matt Groening and Matt Selman, executive producers; Rob LaZebnik, Tim Long, Brian Kelley, Michael Price, Jeff Westbrook, Ryan Koh and Christine Nangle, co-executive producers; Jessica Conrad and Broti Gupta, supervising producers; Loni Steele Sosthand and Richard K. Chung, producers; Tom Klein, animation producer; Mike B. Anderson, supervising director; Matthew Faughnan, assistant director; Scott Brutz, lead animation timer; Chris Clements, directed by; Cesar Mazariegos, written by	Fox
2024 (76th)	X-Men '97	"Remember It"	Beau DeMayo, executive producer/written by; Victoria Alonso, Louis D'Esposito, Kevin Feige and Brad Winderbaum, executive producers; Dana Vasquez-Eberhardt, co-executive producer; Jake Castorena and Charley Feldman, supervising producers; Danielle Costa and Sean Gantka, producers; Meredith Layne, voice directing by; Sang Hyouk Bang and Yun Mo Sung, animation directors; Emi Yonemura, directed by	Disney+
2025 (77th)
2025 (77th)	Arcane	"The Dirt Under Your Nails"	Christian Linke and Alex Yee, executive producers/written by; Marc Merrill, Brandon Beck, Shauna Spenley, Brian Wright, Melinda Wunsch Dilger, Hervé Dupont, Ken Basin and Jérôme Combe, executive producers; Pascal Charrue, executive producer/supervising director; Arnaud Delord, executive producer/supervising director/directed by; Christine Ponzevera and Amanda Overton, co-executive producers; Bart Maunoury, directed by; Amanda Wyatt, voice director	Netflix
2025 (77th)	Bob's Burgers	"They Slug Horses, Don't They?"	Loren Bouchard, Nora Smith, Janelle Momary-Neely, Dan Fybel, Rich Rinaldi, Jon Schroeder, Steven Davis, Scott Jacobson and Holly Schlesinger, executive producers; Jameel Saleem and Lindsey Stoddart, co-executive producers; Katie Crown, supervising producer; Brett Coker, animation executive producer; Bernard Derriman, producer/directed by; Tony Gennaro and Simon Chong, supervising directors	Fox
2025 (77th)	Common Side Effects	"Cliff's Edge"	Joe Bennett, Steve Hely, Mike Judge, Greg Daniels, Dustin Davis, James Merrill, Sean Buckelew, Kelly Crews and Suzanna Makkos, executive producers; Dave King, co-executive producer; Dan Schofield, supervising producer; Max Minor, Susan Shi, Paige Boudreaux and Jonathan Roig, producers; Sophie Kriegel, written by; Vincent Tsui, directed by; Benjy Brooke, supervising director	Adult Swim
2025 (77th)	Love, Death & Robots	"Spider Rose"	David Fincher, Tim Miller, Jennifer Miller, Joshua Donen and Al Shier, executive producers; Victoria Howard, supervising producer; Samantha Brainerd, senior producer; Meg Darcy, producer; Joe Abercrombie, adapted script by; Jennifer Yuh Nelson, directed by	Netflix
2025 (77th)	The Simpsons	"Bart's Birthday"	James L. Brooks, Matt Groening, Matt Selman, Al Jean and John Frink, executive producers; Michael Price, Tim Long, Rob LaZebnik, Brian Kelley, Jeff Westbrook, Dan Vebber, Ryan Koh and Christine Nangle, co-executive producers; Cesar Mazariegos, supervising producer; Richard K. Chung, producer; Tom Klein, animation producer; Jessica Conrad, written by; Rob Oliver, directed by; Mike B. Anderson, supervising director; Dane Romley, assistant director; Carlton Batten, lead animation timer	Fox
2026 (78th)
2026 (78th)	South Park	"Sermon on the 'Mount"	Trey Parker, Matt Stone, Anne Garefino and Frank C. Agnone II, executive producers; Daryl Sancton, supervising producer; Eric Stough, Bruce Howell, Adrien Beard, Vernon Chatman, Jenny Shin, Wonnie Ro, Greg Postma, Keo Thongkham, Lydia Quidilla, John Hansen, David List, Mark Munley, Nate Pellettieri, Andrew B. Rhoades and Gary Martinez, producers	Comedy Central
2026 (78th)	Bob's Burgers	"Grand Pre-Pre-Pre-Opening"	Loren Bouchard and Nora Smith, executive producers/written by; Holly Schlesinger, Janelle Momary-Neely, Dan Fybel, Rich Rinaldi, Jon Schroeder, Scott Jacobson and Steven Davis, executive producers; Lindsey Stoddart and Katie Crown, co-executive producers; Bernard Derriman, producer; Brett Coker and Dana Tafoya-Cameron, animation executive producers; Chris Song, directed by; Tony Gennaro and Simon Chong, supervising directors; Ryan Shaw and Steven Theis, assistant directors; Patrick Gleeson, timing supervisor	Fox
2026 (78th)	Rick and Morty	"There's Something About Morty"	Dan Harmon, Justin Roiland, Scott Marder, Heather Anne Campbell, Steve Levy, Monica Mitchell, Nick Rutherford, Rob Schrab, James Siciliano, Kelly Crews and Cameron Tang, executive producers; Albro Lundy, executive producer/written by; Jess Lacher, co-executive producer; Anthony Alfonso, Suzanne Belk, Garrick Bernard, Lee Harting and Jonathan Brock, producers; Deirdre Brenner, produced by; Douglas Einar Olsen, directed by; Jacob Hair, supervising director	Adult Swim
2026 (78th)	The Simpsons	"Homer? A Cracker Bro?"	James L. Brooks, Matt Groening, Matt Selman and John Frink, executive producers; Tim Long, Rob LaZebnik, Brian Kelley, J. Stewart Burns, Michael Price, Jeff Westbrook, Cesar Mazariegos, Jessica Conrad, Loni Steele Sosthand and Broti Gupta, co-executive producers; Richard K. Chung, producer; Tom Klein, animation producer; Ryan Koh, written by; Chris Clements, directed by; Mike B. Anderson, supervising director; Matthew Faughnan, assistant director; Scott Brutz, lead animation timer	Fox
2026 (78th)	Smiling Friends	"Le Voyage Incroyable de Monsieur Grenouille"	Zach Hadel and Michael Cusack, executive producers/written by/directed by; Kelly Crews and Cameron Tang, executive producers; Brent Tanner, supervising producer; Scott Malchus, producer; David Hootselle, directed by	Adult Swim
2026 (78th)	Star Wars: Visions	"BLACK"	Shinya Ohira, directed by/animation director/written by; James Waugh, Josh Rimes, Jacqui Lopez and Shuichiro Tanaka, executive producers; Justin Leach, co-executive producer; Flannery Huntley, Kanako Shirasaki, Tsutomu Fujio and Jacob Ayres, producers	Disney+

== Records ==
=== Programs with multiple wins ===
12 wins

- The Simpsons

6 wins

- South Park

4 wins

- Garfield television specials

2 wins

- Arcane
- Bob's Burgers
- Futurama
- Rick and Morty
- Star Wars: Clone Wars

=== Programs with multiple nominations ===
35 nominations

- The Simpsons

19 nominations

- South Park

15 nominations

- Bob's Burgers

12 nominations

- Charlie Brown specials
- Garfield television specials

8 nominations

- Futurama

6 nominations

- King of the Hill

5 nominations

- Rick and Morty
- SpongeBob SquarePants

4 nominations

- Archer
- Dexter's Laboratory
- Family Guy
- The Powerpuff Girls
- Robot Chicken

3 nominations

- As Told by Ginger
- Big Mouth
- Duckman
- Foster's Home for Imaginary Friends
- The Ren and Stimpy Show
- Samurai Jack

2 nominations

- American Dad!
- Arcane
- BoJack Horseman
- Camp Lazlo
- Cow and Chicken
- Genndy Tartakovsky's Primal
- Rugrats
- Star Wars: Clone Wars
- Tiny Toon Adventures

=== Total awards by network ===
- FOX – 16
- CBS – 11
- Comedy Central – 7
- Cartoon Network – 6
- Discovery Channel – 5
- ABC – 3
- Adult Swim - 3
- Netflix – 3
- FX – 1
- HBO – 1
- Nickelodeon – 1
- PBS – 1
- The WB – 1

== See also ==
- List of animation awards
- Annie Award for Best Animated Television Production
- Critics' Choice Television Award for Best Animated Series
- Primetime Emmy Award for Outstanding Short Form Animated Program
