= Hamburg Animation Award =

Annual animation competition

The Hamburg Animation Award is an annual international competition for emerging creative talent in animated design. It was initiated in 2003 by the Hamburg Chamber of Commerce and the animation-school-hamburg.

== Competition ==
The Hamburg Animation Award is a platform for showcasing new talent in the field of animation and a networking opportunity for new artists and producers. It addresses students, alumni and young professionals from art and technical schools, academies and universities all over the world.

The best animated short films using any technique (2D, 3D, stop-motion, puppet animation etc.) will be nominated by the expert jury. Submission criteria are a length up to 10 minutes and the creator being a newcomer. The entry can be a graduate project or a short film finished up to three years after graduation. The projects are selected in terms of the components "style" and "story". The competition is looking for an inventive and coherent story told in a fresh or intriguing way, with a style that stands out from existing styles.

Apart from the three main prizes, there are the Harald Siepermann Character Design Award and the Audience Award. A "country award" existed up to 2012 among the entries of all young graduates and animation designers from an annual changing partner country. All submitted shorts for the country award were automatically admitted to the main competition as well. Until 2012 the partner countries included China, France, Denmark, Turkey, United Arab Emirates, New Zealand and the Czech Republic.

== Awards and ceremony ==
Trophies with a total value of 11,000 euros are awarded annually.

- Hamburg Animation Award - 1st Prize: 4.000 Euro
- Hamburg Animation Award - 2nd Prize: 3.000 Euro
- Hamburg Animation Award - 3rd Prize: 2.000 Euro
- Harald Siepermann Character Design Award: 1.000 Euro
- Audience Award: 1.000 Euro

The prizes are awarded at a festive gala ceremony in Hamburg every June. In 2016, the Animation Award will take place at the Börsensaal of the Hamburg Chamber of Commerce. The locations of previous award ceremonies have included the CinemaxX Dammtor, Streits Filmtheater, the Abaton Cinema and Schmidts Tivoli.

The award ceremony is rounded off by talks, panels and networking events. Until 2014, the Made in Hamburg - Animation Jam took place on the day following the award, a fair and lecture event for professional animators and the animation, advertising, film, games and visual effects industry.

== Award winners ==
Year	Animation Award	Animation Special Award for Best Script	Animation Special Award for Best Design	Country Award
2003 (26 June)	Anke Ahlers, Petra Herberger, Elke Junker, Nicola Maier-Reimer, Oliver Smit, Uwe Alexander Tödt forElement 9	Christian Kaiser, Christina Kohlmus, Andrea Krolzick, Nils Oskamp, Kerstin Puigmarti Concha for Voodee	Patrick Bandau, Pia Binder, Ljubisa Djukic, Dominik Heilig, Nadja Klews for Soundcop	
2004 (2 September)	Hochschule für Film und Fernsehen Potsdam-Babelsberg for Pantoffelhelden	animation-school-hamburg for Snowbody	Filmakademie Baden-Württemberg for Wie ich mich traf	Dänemark: A Knight Film by The Animation Workshop

Year	1st Prize	2nd Prize	3rd Prize	Country Award	Audience Award
2005 (3 November)	animation-school-hamburg for Bo	Fachhochschule Mainz, Till Nowak for Delivery	Internationalen Filmschule Köln for For Sale and German Film School, Elstal for Rough AppRoach	Turkey: Anadolu Üniversitesi Güzel Sanatlar Fakültesi, Eskisehir for Love & Marriage	Fachhochschule Mainz, Till Nowak for Delivery
2007 (28 June)	Milen Vitanov for My Happy End	Maike Ramke und Christian Retzlaff, Potsdamer Hochschule für Film und Fernsehen for Dreckmonster	Paul Schicketanz, Max Stöhr und Tobias von Burkersroda, German Film School for Wanted	United Arab Emirates: Mohammed Saeed Harib, American University Dubai for Freej	Milen Vitanov, Potsdamer Hochschule für Film und Fernsehen for My Happy End
2008 (26 June)	Mads Johansen, Torben Søttrup, Karsten Madsen und Lærke Enemark for Office Noise	Tomer Eshed and Dennis Rettkowski for Our wonderful nature	Alexander Pohl forTrickster	Austin Hillebrecht for The Missing Sock	Tomer Eshed and Dennis Rettkowski for Our wonderful nature
2009 (25 June)	Bodie Jahn-Mulliner, Sylvester Rishöj Jensen, Rasmus Hansen and Rasmus Ustrup for Trainbombing	Onni Pohl für Frequenz Morphogenese	Cameron Smith, Hsulynn Pang, Leo Hutson, Chis Medley-Pole, Mark Pearce, Nagaraju Thandu, Yoshihiro Harimoto for Time to fly	Stanislava Mikusová for About the first domestic cat	Aneta Kýrová for Whoops, mistake
2010 (5 July)	Angela Steffen for Lebensader	Jacob Frey, Harry Fast for Bob	Tobias Gundorff Boesen, Katrine Kiilerrich Poulsen, Frederik Villumsen, Christoph Peladen for Out of a Forest	Romain Bourzeix, Damien Levaufre, Thibaut Gache, Aude Glondu for 9 vies	Jacob Frey, Harry Fast for Bob

Year	Hamburg Animation Award	Innovative Design Award	Country Award	Audience Award
2011 (23 June)	Conrad Tambour, Nicolas Palme, Jonas Jarvers, Karsten Wagenknecht, Michael Schulz, Julia Ocker for Der Besuch	Bo Mathorne, Arthur Gil Larsen, Thomas Grønlund, Rie Nymand, Tue Toft Sørensen, Mads Simonsen for The Backwater Gospel	Zhang Wang Cheng, Zhao Yu Chao, Wu Yu Le, Dai Jie Jun, Zhu Xiao Mai, Lu Xiao Yun for Ein Gedanke im August	Tomer Eshed and Dennis Rettkowski for Flamingo Pride

Year	Hamburg Animation Award	Innovative Design Award	Country Award	Audience Award
2012 (6 June)	Johannes Schiehsl, Thorsten Loeffler, Alexander Zlamal, Julia Ocker, Conrad Tambour, Harry Fast, Jacob Frey, Michael Schulz für 366 Tage	David René Christensen, Kristoffer W Mikkelsen, Mark Kjærgaard, Lasse Nænaa Smith, Blake Louis Overgaard, Malte Burup, Jeppe Broo Døcker für Load	Daniel Rieley, Holly Vear, Matt Frost, Carmen Mason, Jamie Muir, Zara Carnegie, Christer Hongisto für A life well-seasoned	Maren Collet, Mareikje Kersting für Bootyful

Year	Hamburg Animation Award	2nd Preis	3rd Preis	Harald Siepermann Character Design Award	Audience Award
2013 (6 August)	Robert Löbel for Wind	Jakub Kouril for M.O.	Kyra Buschor, Anna Habermehl, Constantin Päplow for Rolling Safari	Robert Löbel for Wind	Ben Genislaw, Yonni Aroussi for Happily Ever After

Year	Hamburg Animation Award - Shorts	Hamburg Animation Award - Games	Hamburg Animation Award - Advertising	Harald Siepermann Character Design Award	Audience Award
2014 (24 June)	Michael Bidinger, Michelle Kwon (Directors), Sarah Kambara (Producer) for Jinxy Jenkins, Lucky Lou	Mathias Fischer, Michael Kluge, Clemens Kügler, Marc Victorin, Vanessa Zeeb for Scherbenwerk - Bruchteil einer Ewigkeit	Sandin Puce, Dominik Berg, Sven Gossel, Anna Nekarda for Frenki	Charlie Aufroy, Renaud Deloupy, Benjamin Fenouil, Robin Geille, Alisson Guyot, Tristan Lebas, Célia Prou, Adrien Sibi for Emile	Michael Bidinger, Michelle Kwon (Directors), Sarah Kambara (Producer) for Jinxy Jenkins, Lucky Lou

Year	Hamburg Animation Award	2nd Award	3rd Award	Harald Siepermann Character Design Award	Audience Award
2015 (30. June)	Anni Oja for The Moustache	Nataliya Metlukh for Fears	Laurent Moing, Guitty Mojabi for Duo	Salvatore Centoducati et al. for Office Kingdom	Mads Weidner for Parrot Away

== See also ==
- List of animation awards
