= Irish Animation Awards =

Irish animation award

Irish Animation Awards,
- Country: Ireland
- Website: www.irishanimationawards.ie

The Irish Animation Awards, for which the winners receive a statuette in the shape of a phenakistoscope, an early animation device, were first held on 13 March 2015 in Dingle, County Kerry. The statuette was designed by animator, film maker and teacher Eimhin McNamara. The judges included CBBC, Nickelodeon and CBeebies The second award ceremony took place on 25 March 2017. Winners included Song of the Sea as best Irish feature film and Jam Media, whose Roy, won the Kids’ Choice Award for best animated series. The best music/sound design award was given to Danger Mouse. In 2017, Paul Young, then industry chair of Animation Ireland and co-founder of Cartoon Saloon said: “We Irish have a passion for storytelling and the arts – a culture which is ideally suited for the creativity of world-class animation studios and the quality of the award nominees shows this.”

== See also ==
- List of animation awards
