= Tokyo Anime Center =

Anime museum in Tokyo, Japan

- 東京アニメセンター
- Location within Special wards of Tokyo
- Established: 15 March 2006 (inside Akihabara UDX); 28 October 2017 (moved to DNP Plaza); April 16, 2021 (moved to Shibuya Modi); April 13, 2024 (1st overseas location in Japantown, San Francisco)
- Location: Japan, 〒150-0041 Tokyo, Shibuya City, Jinnan, 1 Chome−21−3, Marui City Shibuya, 2F; 1581 Webster Street, Suite 115, San Francisco, CA 94115
- Owner: The Association of Japanese Animations
- Website: tokyoanimecenter.jp

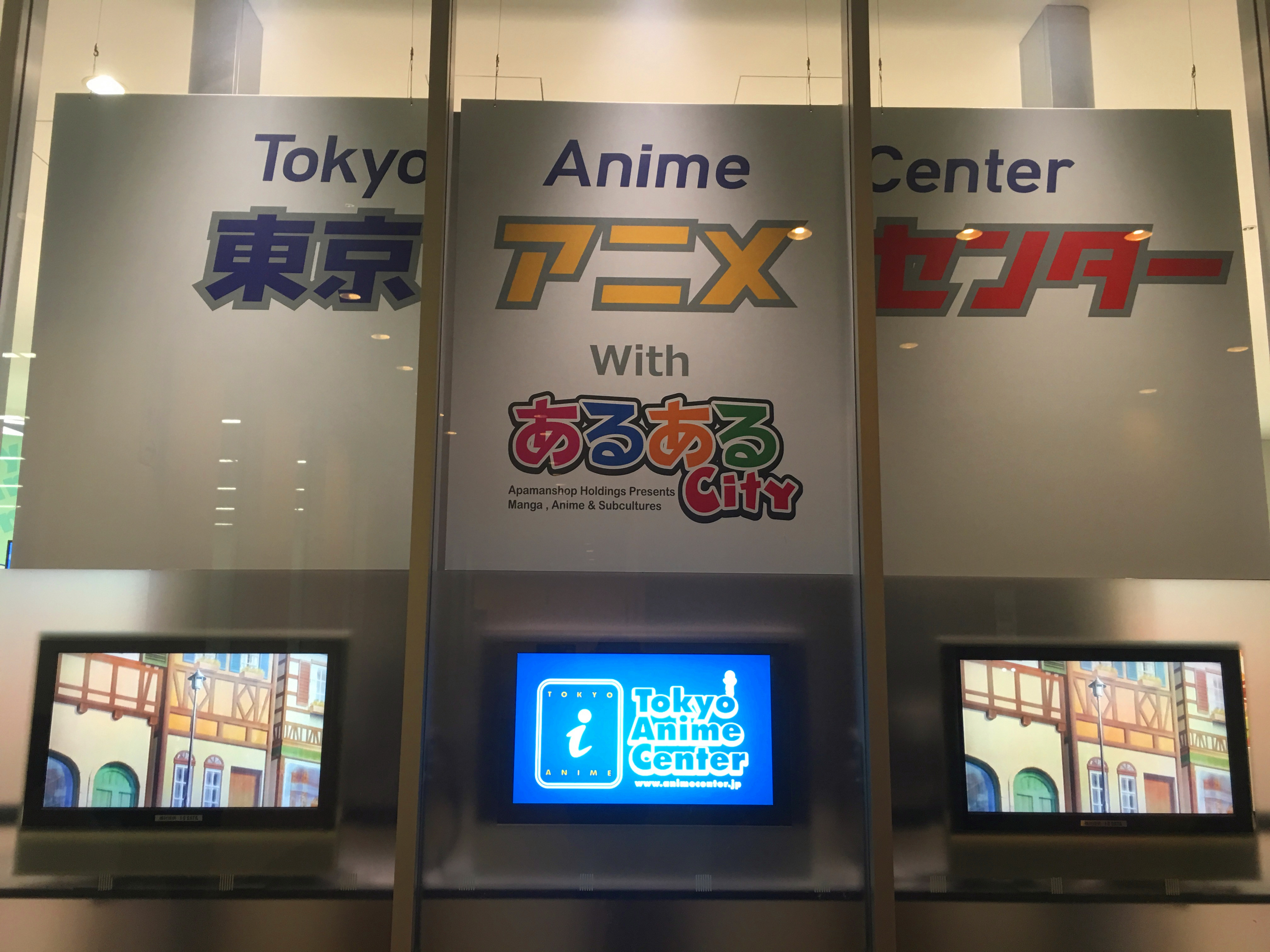
Tokyo Anime Center

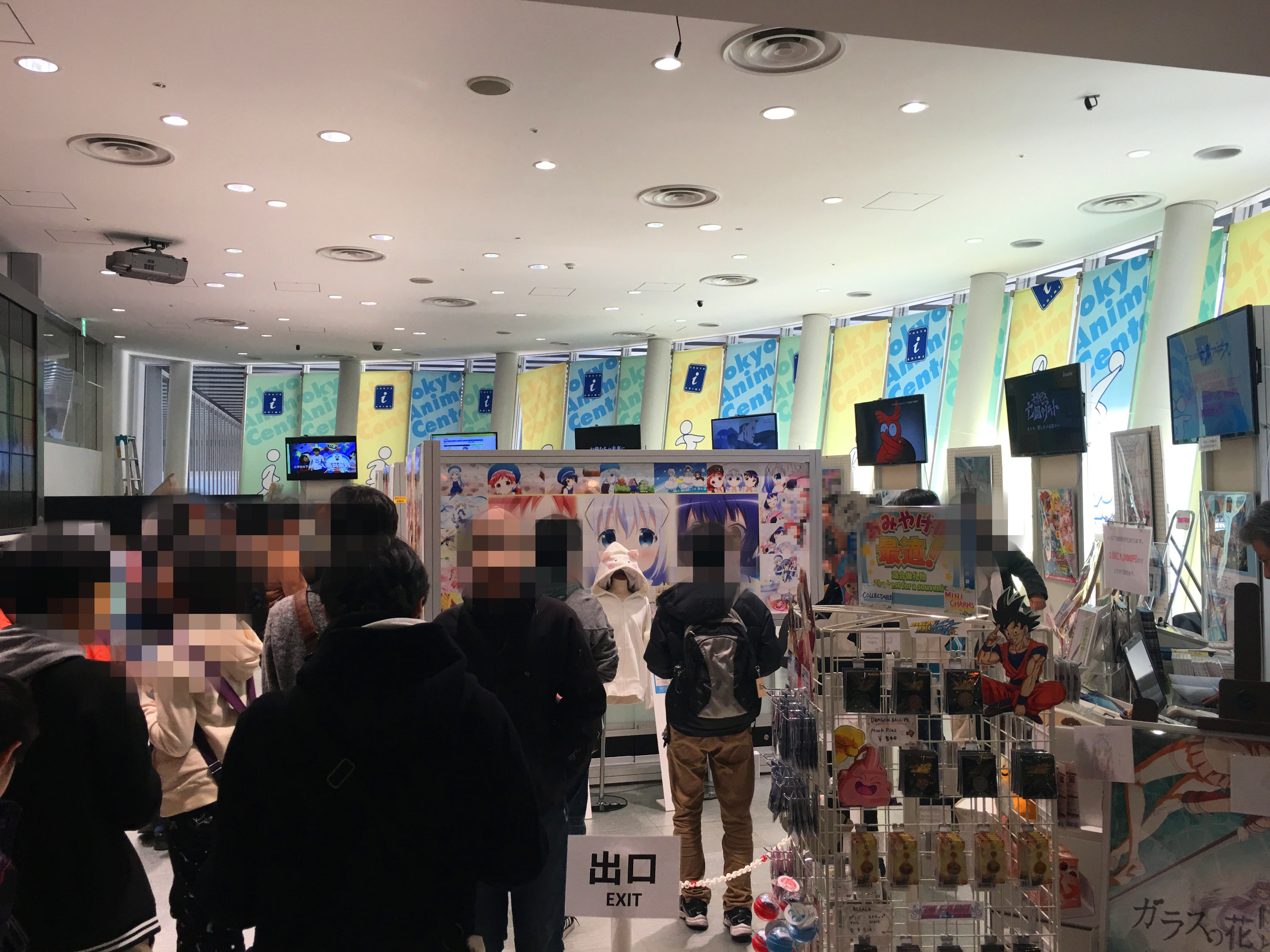
Tokyo Anime Center

The Tokyo Anime Center (東京アニメセンター) is a facility that was created to market anime to residents of Japan and foreign visitors. The facility hosts events such as live radio interviews with creators, voice actors, and merchandising fairs. It once included the AKIBA 3DTheater. It dubs itself "the definitive spot for anime and anime-related entertainment."

It was previously located on the fourth floor of the Akihabara UDX building near JR Akihabara Station.

In 2007, many promotional displays for the then-upcoming Rebuild of Evangelion movie were set up inside the Tokyo Anime Center, including life-size cardboard stand-ups of Rei Ayanami and interactive demos.

More permanent sections of the center contain merchandise from popular anime series, such as mugs, keychains, promotional flyers, mouse pads, etc.

On January 10, 2011, the Tokyo Anime Center temporarily closed. It reopened on a trial basis on February 26 of the same year, under the sole management of the Association of Japanese Animations, and then renovated and officially reopened on April 12.

It closed again in February 2012 and then reopened on August 25 of that year under a joint management agreement with Apaman Shop Network. The facility was renamed "Tokyo Anime Center in Aruaru City," after a facility operated by Apaman Shop Network in Kitakyushu, Fukuoka.

On July 29, 2017, the Tokyo Anime Center ended its operation inside the Akihabara UDX building due to the expiration of its tenant contract. It subsequently changed its management to Dainippon Printing Co., Ltd. and moved to DNP Plaza in the Ichigaya-Tamachi district of Shinjuku, Tokyo. The facility reopened on October 28, 2017, with the new name "Tokyo Anime Center in DNP Plaza."

On April 16, 2021, it moved to the 2nd floor of "Shibuya Modi" in Shibuya, Tokyo, aiming to provide new experience that combined the real and virtual. The name of the facility was changed to "Tokyo Anime Center in DNP PLAZA Shibuya.

On April 13, 2024, the first overseas location opened in Japantown, San Francisco, California.
