= Anne Garefino =

American film and television producer (born 1959)

Anne Garefino (born July 1, 1959) is an American film and television producer. She is the co-executive producer (with Trey Parker and Matt Stone) of the long-running series South Park, and the co-executive producer of the Broadway musical The Book of Mormon (with Scott Rudin). Continuing her work on South Park, she was the executive producer of the film South Park: Bigger, Longer & Uncut, which received an Academy Award nomination for Best Original Song. She also was the executive producer of the film Team America: World Police. She is a practicing Catholic.

== About ==
Raised in Lambertville, New Jersey, she graduated from Boston College, where she majored in finance. She received her MFA at the AFI Conservatory in Los Angeles in 1988.

== Awards ==
Garefino has been nominated for thirteen and won five Primetime Emmy Awards for her work on South Park, and won both a Tony Award and a Grammy Award for her work on The Book of Mormon. She is an Oscar away from achieving EGOT status. In 2014 she won the American Film Institute's Franklin J. Schaffner Alumni Medal.
