= Animation Ireland =

Irish film animators trade association

- Type: Trade association
- Location: Ireland
- Members: Over 30 animation companies (as of 2020)
- Website: Official website

Animation Ireland is the trade association for Ireland's animation industry. Originally sponsored by Enterprise Ireland, Animation Ireland is an umbrella brand under which Ireland's animation companies organise and collaborate for the international promotion of their collective interests. Animation Ireland's stated objective is, "to establish Ireland as a creative centre for content and technology by focusing on growth, developing an innovation culture and creating competitive advantage for members." As of 2020, Animation Ireland has over 30 members, up from 25 in 2018 and 14 in 2015. The biennial Irish Animation Awards has been hosted by Animation Ireland since 2015, honouring Ireland's animation, gaming and VFX industries.

Animation Ireland's personnel advise members on international tradeshows and festivals and introduce animation companies to potential partners. Although functioning from 2006, in 2015 Animation Ireland received funding from the Irish Film Board, obtained an independent chairperson and undertook a greater role in structuring the animation industry in Ireland.

== See also ==
- Irish Animation Awards
- Screen Ireland
