= List of The Danny Thomas Show episodes =

This is a list of episodes for the television program The Danny Thomas Show, which was titled Make Room for Daddy for the first three seasons. All episodes were filmed in black-and-white.

== Series overview ==
At present, only seasons five and six have been released on DVD.

Season	Title	Episodes	Originally released			Rank	Rating
Season	Title	Episodes	First released	Last released	Network	Rank	Rating
1	Make Room for Daddy	30	September 29, 1953	April 20, 1954	ABC	—N/a	—N/a
2	Make Room for Daddy	30	September 28, 1954	April 26, 1955	ABC	—N/a	—N/a
3	Make Room for Daddy	30	September 13, 1955	April 17, 1956	ABC	—N/a	—N/a
4	The Danny Thomas Show	30	October 1, 1956	April 25, 1957	ABC	—N/a	—N/a
5	The Danny Thomas Show	32	October 7, 1957	May 26, 1958	CBS	2	35.3
6	The Danny Thomas Show	33	October 6, 1958	May 25, 1959	CBS	5	32.8
7	The Danny Thomas Show	33	October 5, 1959	May 23, 1960	CBS	4	31.1
8	The Danny Thomas Show	32	October 3, 1960	May 22, 1961	CBS	12	25.9
9	The Danny Thomas Show	31	October 2, 1961	May 7, 1962	CBS	8	26.1
10	The Danny Thomas Show	32	October 1, 1962	May 6, 1963	CBS	7	28.7 (Note: Tied with Ben Casey)
11	The Danny Thomas Show	30	September 30, 1963	April 27, 1964	CBS	9	26.7

== Episodes ==
=== Season 1 (1953–54) ===
No. overall	No. in season	Title	Directed by	Written by	Original release date
1	1	"Uncle Daddy"	William Asher	Melville Shavelson	September 29, 1953
Danny Williams (Danny Thomas) is called Uncle Daddy by his children after being away for months. Horace McMahon as Horace. Phil Arnold as Tailor. Ann Doran as Teacher. Frank Jenks as Frank the Writer.
2	2	"Party Dress"	William Asher	Bob Fisher & Alan Lipscott	October 6, 1953
Ben Lessy tries to play a song for Danny. Danny wants to go home to see his kids. Danny tries to tell Ben what it's like to have a little girl. Back at home Margaret (Jean Hagen) and Louise (Louise Beavers) are fitting Terry's (Sherry Jackson) party dress for the dance. Danny comes home with a doll for Terry, but she doesn't even notice it. Danny is concerned about Terry going a formal dance with boys. Margaret reminds him that Terry is 11 years old. Terry starts crying when Danny says she can't go to the dance. Danny meets Donald Cooper, the boy who was to take Terry to the dance. Danny sends him away. Later, Danny is giving Rusty (Rusty Hamer) a bath. Danny overhears Terry telling Margaret that she will never talk to him again. Margaret tries to explain to her why Danny doesn't want her going to the dance. She tells Terry what Danny was like when he was younger and that's why he doesn't trust boys. Margaret gets Terry to use some reverse psychology on Danny and he lets her go to the dance. Danny comes home from the club and tells Margaret how Terry is growing up. He sees Terry sleeping with the doll. Song: Danny sings "Daddy's Little Girl".
3	3	"Second Honeymoon"	William Asher	Story by : Sumner Arthur Long; Teleplay by : Bob Fisher & Alan Lipscott	October 13, 1953
Margaret tells Louise that after 12 years, she's finally going on her second honeymoon. She's going to have some alone time with Danny. She has not even told him where they are going. Louise says that Danny's been trying to find out from her. Danny tries to bribe the kids into telling him. Danny finds out they are going to Atlantic City because Laddie the dog had a pamphlet from there in his mouth. At the hotel, Danny is surprised to get a call from his agent, Mack. Mack would like Danny to perform in Asbury Park with Jerry Harris (Rhys Williams). They would have to postpone the honeymoon. Margaret gets upset and heads for home. Danny is at the club in Asbury Park and does a routine about when he and Margaret were first married. That was when he first met Jerry. Danny was at a place in the Catskill Mountains run by Luther Gunther (Walter Catlett). Danny was a social director and Margaret was a waitress. Flashback to then. Danny and Margaret have to keep their marriage a secret. They are so busy, they have no time together. Luther insists that Danny have dinner with Myrtle Potter (Shirley Mitchell). Margaret gets upset when Myrtle flirts with Danny. Luther learns Danny and Margaret are married and fires them. Jerry Harris offers Danny a job. It comes out that Margaret is pregnant. Back to the present. Margaret surprises Danny at the club. It turns out that Jerry married Myrtle. Song: Danny sings "How Deep Is the Ocean?".
4	4	"Mother-in-Law"	William Asher	Bob Fisher & Alan Lipscott	October 20, 1953
The next night is Danny's opening. Margaret mentions that Louise is off and wonders who will babysit. Danny says they will get Julia (Nana Bryant), Margaret's mother. Margaret thinks they have been asking her too much. Danny calls Julia. She thought he was calling to invite her to the opening. Julia is disappointed when she learns it's to babysit. Danny is going over his act with Benny and his writer Artie. Gus the Masseur (Sheldon Leonard) comes by. Danny forgot he is doing a benefit that night. He calls Julia to babysit tonight as well as tomorrow night. Danny and Margaret leave for the benefit. Julia tells Rusty and Terry about her days in Vaudeville with her husband Harry. The act died when Harry died. Danny and Margaret come home to find Rusty and Terry sleeping on the couch. Julia is sleeping in the other room. The kids tell them that Grandma misses performing and she sang for them. At Danny's opening at the club, Julia is there and he brings her on stage. He has her perform with him. Songs: Danny sings "Show Me A Rose" and "My Mother's Eyes". Nana sings "Your Eyes Have Told Me So". Danny and Nana sing "Moonlight Bay".
5	5	"Anniversary"	William Asher	Alan Lipscott & Bob Fisher	October 27, 1953
Margaret and Louise set the table for an anniversary celebration. Margaret says that Danny will not forget their anniversary. The kids are being sent to Grandma Julia's. After his performance at the club, Danny gets together with a bunch of the guys for a card game. Danny remembers that this is the night that Margaret goes to the movies with her mother. Danny wants to move the card game to his house. At the house, Danny realizes it's his anniversary. An upset Margaret leaves. Later that night, Margaret comes back but is not speaking to Danny. Danny tells Ben it's been two days and Margaret still is not talking to him. Margaret will make Ben and the kids something to eat, but not Danny. Danny remembers their first anniversary. Flashback to living in an apartment under a bowling alley. They had very little money. Terry was 7 weeks old. They exchange gifts. Danny wants to give up being a performer and go back to his old steady job as a shoe salesman. Margaret will not let him do it. Back to the present. Danny shows Ben the diamond watch he wants to give to Margaret. Danny accidentally gives her the watch he gave her on their first anniversary. They make up and Margaret sees the diamond watch. Frank Gerstle as Danny's Publicity Man. Robert Foulk as Stagehand. Songs: Danny and Ben Lessy perform "Bye Bye Blackbird". Danny and Jean sing "I've Got the World on a String".
6	6	"Margaret, Non-Pro"	William Asher	Bob Fisher & Alan Lipscott	November 3, 1953
Margaret attempts to begin her own showbiz career.
7	7	"The Visiting Englishman"	Sheldon Leonard	Bob Weiskopf	November 10, 1953
Danny brings home an English musician friend of his, Montague Brooks (John Hoyt). Montague's hotel reservations got mixed up. Montague says he gave up music years ago. Danny assures him that Margaret will not have a problem with him spending the night. The next morning, Rusty and Terry find Montague sleeping on the couch. He entertains the children with some poorly done magic tricks. Margaret meets Montague and asks Danny about him. Danny says he will be leaving today. Danny and Margaret overhear Montague call the hotel and cancel his reservation. Louise complains about Montague. He's been there three weeks. Danny says he's a nice guy and the kids like him. When Danny learns Montague's been wearing his clothes, he wants him gone. At dinner, Montague tries the trick of pulling the table cloth out from under the dishes. He makes a mess. Jesse Leeds (Jesse White) comes by and thanks Danny for taking care of Montague. Montague has taken up an interest of going back to England and starting up his orchestra. They learn that Montague lost his family in the war. Danny and Margaret want Montague to stay longer, but he says he will be going to England. Later, Danny brings home another house guest (Lock Martin). Song: John Hoyt sings "Waltzing Matilda".
8	8	"The Sea Captain"	Sheldon Leonard	Alan Lipscott & Bob Fisher	November 17, 1953
Danny tells Ben that he wants to spend some time with the kids. Danny's birthday is coming up and he hopes the kids remembered. The kids come home and leave just as quickly. Margaret tells Danny that the kids went to see the new janitor. He's Captain Chris (Edgar Buchanan), an old retired sea captain. Chris tells them stories and has the boiler room set up like a ship. Terry tells Rusty that they should buy Chris a new sweater because his is torn. The kids show Danny the boat in a bottle that Chris made them. Danny and Margaret overhear the kids taking about the sweater and Danny thinks they're getting him one for his birthday. It's Danny's birthday and Margaret brings him breakfast in bed. She gives him a ring. Danny learns the kids forgot his birthday and the sweater is for Captain Chris. Danny knows he's competing for their attention. He takes the kids to the Palace Theater and shows them how interesting and fun show business is. Later, Danny tells Margaret that he doesn't think he got through to the kids. They give Danny a present in a show business style. Alice Bauer as Self - Golf Pro & Lucky Strike Pitchman. Jinx Falkenburg as Self - Speidel Pitchman. Donald Woods as Self - Speidel Pitchman. Songs: Danny Thomas and Ben Lessy perform "My Blue Heaven". Jean Hagen sings "Happy Birthday to You". Danny sings "Roamin' In The Gloamin'", "Sonny Boy", "There's No Business Like Show Business" and "Speidel Jingle".
9	9	"Thanksgiving Story"	Sheldon Leonard	Bob Fisher & Alan Lipscott	November 24, 1953
The Williams may have to spend Thanksgiving without Danny when he gets stranded in Boston.
10	10	"Last Dollar"	Sheldon Leonard	Bob Fisher & Alan Lipscott	December 1, 1953
A dollar is missing and Rusty swears he didn't take it.
11	11	"Margaret's Job"	Sheldon Leonard	Bob Fisher & Alan Lipscott	December 8, 1953
Margaret is getting the kids ready for school. Danny is getting ready for rehearsal. Margaret is picking up after him. Margaret tells him that she's getting together with an old college friend, Lydia Miller (Jorja Curtright). Lydia married one of the richest men in Chicago. He set her up with her own cosmetics company. Lydia tells Margaret how much traveling she has to do. Lydia asks Margaret about herself and Margaret doesn't have much to say. Lydia asks Margaret if she would like to run her New York office, but Margaret turns her down. When the kids and Danny come home, Margaret is not in a good mood. She tells Danny that he's afraid that if she were successful, it would take the limelight off of him. Danny laughs when she tells him that Lydia offered her an executive job. She calls Lydia and excepts the job. Danny has the kids with him at the theater. Rusty handcuffs him and Danny together and doesn't have the key. Danny has to bring Rusty on stage. Rusty manages to tell a couple jokes. Later, Margaret and Lydia are working at home. Margaret tells the kids she's too busy and sends them to bed. Lydia spends some time with the kids. She tells the kids she's just too busy to have children and is sad about it. Lydia wants Margaret to spend time with her kids and fires her. Jimmy Hatlo as Self - Cartoonist & Lucky Strike Pitchman. Song: Danny sings "Me and My Shadow".
12	12	"Wonderland"	Sheldon Leonard	Alan Lipscott & Bob Fisher	December 15, 1953
Danny cannot remember the last time he had two days off. Margaret is sending the kids to Grandma's so her and Danny can be alone. Just then Chips Collins (Harvey Lembeck), Danny's new Press Agent, comes by. Chips lets Danny know that a radio contestant won the privilege of spending the weekend at the home of Danny Williams. Danny and Margaret are not happy. Chips says he will take care of it and have Eloise Adams (Spring Byington) stay at a hotel instead. Eloise comes by and says she's never heard of Danny. Chips tried to get her to go to a hotel, but she threatened to go to the newspapers if she didn't stay with Danny. They hope she will not like staying in the kids room, but she loves it. Eloise is quite eccentric and quotes many different writers. Chips tells Danny that tonight the place will be filled with photographers. Eloise tells Danny she's never seen a night club performer. Danny and Margaret put on a show for her and Eloise has a great time. They start to become fond of Eloise. Roger Grayson (Dayton Lummis), the superintendent of the Brookdale Home, comes by. He's come for Eloise. Danny and Margaret recreate the Mad Hatter's tea party from Alice in Wonderland for Eloise. Danny makes Roger promise he will bring Eloise back next weekend. Songs: Danny sings "A Man's Best Friend Is His Mummy". Danny, Jean and Spring Byington perform "Twinkle, Twinkle, Little Bat".
13	13	"Christmas"	Sheldon Leonard	Bob Fisher & Alan Lipscott	December 22, 1953
Margaret, Rusty and Terry are decorating the Christmas tree. Rusty says there is no Santa Claus. Margaret says all the Santas in the stores are his helpers. She also says that Danny will be coming home from Detroit. Meanwhile, Danny tells Ben Lessy and Patti Moore that he cannot wait to get home. Tom Kelly (Tom Tully), the club owner, tells them that the entertainer who was supposed to be next, is sick. Tom shows Danny where in the contract it states that he has an option of extending Danny's stay. Danny calls Margaret and tells her the bad news. That night, Danny, Ben and Patti are doing their show. Danny mentions to the audience that he was supposed to be home with his family. Danny works that into a funny monologue. It's Christmas day and Tom shows Danny the penthouse he's putting him up in. Danny is still upset about Tom keeping him from home. Margaret and the kids come in the room. Tom had sent for them. Tom even put a Christmas tree in the place. Rusty wonders about his presents and Danny realizes he had them all sent to New York. While the kids are in another room, Tom comes by with all the presents. Songs: Ben Lessy and Patti Moore perform "Pretty Boy". Danny sings "The Best Things in Life Are Free" and "Christmas Story".
14	14	"Toledo"	Sheldon Leonard	Alan Lipscott & Bob Fisher	December 29, 1953
Danny is going back to his native Toledo to give a speech to the Toledo Newsboys Annual Banquet. He took Terry and Rusty with him and they are taking a train there. Danny shows them some pictures of where he lived. He tells them about his best friend as a child, Charlie Patchok (Maxie Rosenbloom). Danny finds a letter from Rusty's principal about Rusty shooting spitballs in class. Danny then lectures Rusty on being good in school. In Toledo, Miss Whittaker (Mabel Paige), Danny's sixth grade school teacher, comes to his hotel room. She mentions how Danny used to throw spitballs in class. She also tells other stories of the naughty things Danny did. Later, Charlie comes by and Danny doesn't recognize him at first. Charlie also mentions some of the bad things they did as kids. Danny was under the impression that Charlie was a manager at the paper, but he just sells them. At the banquet, Danny gives a moving and often funny speech. Afterwards, Terry and Rusty are very proud of their father.
15	15	"Margaret's Jealousy"	Sheldon Leonard	Bob Fisher & Alan Lipscott	January 5, 1954
Margaret wants to make Danny a special breakfast. He took her out to dinner and a play the night before. Rusty is playing with his camera and is taking everyone's picture. Grandma Julia comes by. Margaret tells her that Danny gave up his poker night to take her out. They saw "The Seven Year Itch". It's about a long-married husband who develops a roving eye. Margaret starts to wonder why Danny took her to that particular play. Her, Julia and Terry go shopping. Danny takes Rusty to the theater with him. A blonde woman (Adele Jergens) comes in the dressing room and gives Danny a kiss. Rusty takes a picture of it. She talks about Danny as an old friend and says they will have to spend more time together. After she leaves, Danny asks Chips Collins who the woman was. Later, Rusty shows Margaret the picture of Danny kissing the woman. She recognizes the woman as Irva Kruger, who Danny used to go out with. Danny and Chips come home and Margaret shows him the picture. After Margaret says who it is, Danny remembers Irva. Danny tries to explain that there's nothing between him and Irva, but Margaret is still jealous. Days later, Julia brings Irva to talk to Margaret. Irva says she's happily married and there was nothing to the kiss she gave Danny. Irva shows them pictures of her 4 children and her husband. There's another misunderstanding, but Danny and Margaret make up. Song: Danny and Jean each sing "The Glory of Love".
16	16	"Terry for President"	Sheldon Leonard	Bob Fisher & Alan Lipscott	January 12, 1954
Terry runs for class president with Danny as her campaign manager.
17	17	"True Blue Benny"	Sheldon Leonard	Bob Fisher & Alan Lipscott	January 19, 1954
Danny plans a party for Benny in honor of their 12th anniversary as a team.
18	18	"Rusty Runs Away"	Sheldon Leonard	Bob Fisher & Alan Lipscott	January 26, 1954
Rusty runs away from home and encounters a policeman who offers his help. Ernest Borgnine as Policeman. Ray Kellogg as Policeman.
19	19	"The Professor"	Sheldon Leonard	Bob Fisher & Alan Lipscott	February 2, 1954
Danny gives a lecture to the kids on unselfishness. But his attitude changes when Danny discovers that they have brought a bum into the house for dinner without his knowledge. The former Professor (Glenn Langan) turns out to be an old flame of Margaret's.
20	20	"Burlesque"	Sheldon Leonard	Bob Fisher & Alan Lipscott	February 9, 1954
Danny puts on a burlesque show for VIPs who do not approve. George N. Neise. Frank Wilcox.
21	21	"Black Eyes"	Sheldon Leonard	Bob Fisher & Alan Lipscott	February 16, 1954
Danny teaches Rusty to defend himself against a school bully.
22	22	"Margaret's Birthday"	Sheldon Leonard	Alan Lipscott & Bob Fisher	February 23, 1954
Margaret is explaining to her bridge club how she showed Danny a mink coat in order to get him to buy her the ring she really wanted for her birthday. Unfortunately, the new tape recorder was running. Danny hears the conversation and decides to teach Margaret a lesson, but Danny is the one who learns the lesson. Harvey Lembeck as Chips. Shirley Mitchell as Helen. Jacqueline deWit as Elvira. Marianne Stewart as Grace.
23	23	"The Matchmaker"	Sheldon Leonard	Bob Fisher & Alan Lipscott	March 2, 1954
Margaret tries to play matchmaker for Jesse.
24	24	"Night Club"	Sheldon Leonard	Bob Fisher & Alan Lipscott	March 9, 1954
Danny goes out to a night club while trying to find a hobby. Wallace Ford.
25	25	"Terry's Career"	Sheldon Leonard	Bob Fisher & Alan Lipscott	March 16, 1954
Terry wants to start her own career in show business. Clifford David. Martha Wentworth.
26	26	"School Festival"	Sheldon Leonard	Bob Fisher & Alan Lipscott	March 23, 1954
Danny appears at a PTA festival and worries that it will affect Rusty's education. Jan Clayton as Miss Anderson.
27	27	"Rusty's Pal"	Sheldon Leonard	Bob Fisher & Alan Lipscott	March 30, 1954
Rusty finds a new friend in a hobo (Tom Tully).
28	28	"Julia's Birthday"	William Asher	Bob Fisher & Alan Lipscott	April 6, 1954
Danny learns that his mother-in-law Julia is depressed on her birthday because she's too old to land any acting roles. Danny tries to help her land a starring role on a television series.
29	29	"Pittsburgh"	Sheldon Leonard	Bob Fisher & Alan Lipscott	April 13, 1954
Danny is in Pittsburgh doing a movie with Marie McDonald when the kids surprise him backstage.
30	30	"Danny's Vacation"	Sheldon Leonard	Bob Fisher & Alan Lipscott	April 20, 1954
Danny tries to have a pleasant vacation, but Margaret's college reunion proves to be disruptive. Madge Blake as Mrs. Baker.

=== Season 2 (1954–55) ===
No. overall	No. in season	Title	Directed by	Written by	Original release date
31	1	"Family Trouble"	Sheldon Leonard	Mac Benoff	September 28, 1954
At breakfast, Terry asks Margaret for her weekly allowance. She thinks she should get more than 50 cents. Rusty wants an allowance also, but Margaret says they have to ask Danny. Margaret mentions Danny has not been in a good mood lately. Danny complains that all they ever have for breakfast is eggs. Rusty asks Danny for an allowance and Danny says everyone wants money from him. Later, agent Jesse Leeds (Jesse White) tells Margaret that Danny has lost his confidence. He wants to cancel his engagement at the Copa. To give Danny some confidence, Margaret tells the kids to laugh at anything Danny says. When they all laugh, Danny knows something is up. Danny thinks it's about Rusty getting an allowance, which isn't going to happen. The next day, Louise (Louise Beavers) tells Danny that he should not be so hard on Rusty. To get money, Rusty is charging some of his friends and he will put on a show for them. When Terry introduces Rusty, he will not come out of his room. Danny checks on Rusty and Rusty says he doesn't think he can put on a good show. Danny tells him he has to believe in himself. Danny realizes that he needs to believe in himself as well. Rusty asks Danny to do the show for him, which Danny does. Later, Jesse tells Margaret that Danny is performing much better. Song: Danny performs "The Money Song".
32	2	"Tonsillectomy"	Sheldon Leonard	Mac Benoff	October 5, 1954
Danny considers getting a nose job before signing a movie contract while he and Rusty have their tonsils removed.
33	3	"Terry Takes Charge"	Sheldon Leonard	Mac Benoff	October 12, 1954
Terry wants to be in charge of the house while Margaret is serving jury duty. Elvia Allman as Maid. Steven Geray as Doctor.
34	4	"Danny Has a Baby"	Sheldon Leonard	Mac Benoff	October 19, 1954
Danny is asked to take care of a baby, but Margaret doesn't think he's qualified.
35	5	"Military School"	Sheldon Leonard	Mac Benoff	October 26, 1954
Rusty may be sent to military school for his bad report card.
36	6	"Danny Lands in Pictures"	Sheldon Leonard	Mac Benoff	November 2, 1954
When a producer promises Danny a part in a film, the Williams family prepare for their trip to Hollywood. Alan Reed. Chester Conklin as Keystone Cop #1. James Gleason. Charles Halton. Hank Mann as Keystone Cop #2.
37	7	"Hollywood Trip"	Sheldon Leonard	Robert O'Brien & Irving Elinson	November 9, 1954
In Hollywood, Danny has the family help him rehearse for the film. Mr. Hillie (Alan Reed) calls and tells Danny the screen test went well. Danny hopes to buy a home in Hollywood and settle down. Meanwhile, Hillie tells Jesse Leeds that Danny needs to do something about his nose. Jesse refuses to suggest to Danny that he go to a plastic surgeon. When he's told about his nose, Danny says he just can't do it. Margaret and the kids tell Danny that they found the perfect house. Seeing how happy they are, Danny tells Margaret that he will have his nose fixed. He lies and says he's wanted to do it for years. Margaret isn't sure, but reluctantly agrees to let Danny do what he wants. Danny goes to see the doctor. Margaret tells the kids that they need to support Danny's decision. At the doctor's office, Danny tells Jesse that he's a little surprised that Margaret went along with it. Jesse says that Margaret doesn't want Danny to change. Jesse says Danny's greatest asset is his personality. Hillie comes by wanting to talk to Danny. Margaret learns that it was Hillie's idea about the nose, not Danny's. Just then Danny comes home with his nose bandaged. The family starts crying. Knowing how the family really feels, Danny takes off the bandage and his nose hasn't been touched. Song: Danny and Jean sing "My Funny Valentine".
38	8	"Anniversary"	Sheldon Leonard	Robert O'Brien & Irving Elinson	November 16, 1954
Danny gets in trouble when he's unable to celebrate his wedding anniversary with Margaret.
39	9	"Margaret's Aunt"	Sheldon Leonard	Robert O'Brien & Irving Elinson	November 23, 1954
Margaret acts as peacemaker between her mother and her aunt, but enlists the help of an unsuspecting Danny. Louise Lorimer as Margaret's Aunt.
40	10	"Terry's Boyfriend"	Sheldon Leonard	Mac Benoff	November 30, 1954
The kids come home from school. Rusty keeps repeating "Terry's in love". A dazed Terry says that of all the boys at school, Class President Johnny Lane asked her to the annual dance. Terry tells Danny and Margaret how it happened. Danny doesn't think Terry is old enough to go to a dance with a boy. Later, Terry's been on the phone for an hour calling her girlfriends to tell them about Johnny. Danny comes home upset because the phone was tied up. Margaret tells Danny to be more understanding. Danny shows her a ticket to the dance and it says that he will be performing. Danny says he wasn't even asked. He thinks Johnny used Terry to get to him. Margaret tells him that Terry invited Johnny for dinner. After dinner, Margaret thinks Johnny's a very nice boy. Johnny hints that they need an entertainer for the dance. Margaret makes Danny say he will do it. Later, Danny tells Terry that Johnny used her. Johnny comes by and Terry says that she and Danny won't be at the dance. After Johnny leaves, Terry starts crying because she thinks all the kids will hate her for ruining the dance. Johnny comes by to apologize and admits her used her because he was forced to. Terry agrees to go to the dance and Danny agrees to perform. Johnny says thanks but they already booked a singing dog act. Songs: Danny sings "I'm Looking Over a Four Leaf Clover", "I'll String Along With You", "Breezin' Along with the Breeze", "If I Could Be with You (One Hour Tonight)" and "The Birth of the Blues".
41	11	"Margaret Feels Neglected"	Sheldon Leonard	Robert O'Brien & Irving Elinson	December 7, 1954
Margaret didn't have a good time at the party last night. She complains that it was all Danny's friends and she felt like a nobody. Everything is about Danny and she gets no attention. Even the kids take her for granted. Jesse comes by and something he says doesn't make Margaret feel better. Jesse tells Danny they have a luncheon date with Steve Regan (Hy Averback). He's the guy that hosts the show "I Married A Celebrity". Jesse has it set up for Margaret to go on the show. Danny talks to the kids and asks them to be nicer to Margaret. Jesse brings Margaret candy and Danny brings her flowers. She knows they are up to something. They tell her she's going to be on TV. When she finds out what show, she says that she will just tell the truth. Now Danny and Jesse are worried. Danny tells Jesse that what ever Margaret says, he will just make a joke out of it. On the show, Danny gets to wear a crown and sit on a throne. Regan introduces Margaret. Margaret does have nice things to say about Danny. Danny puts Margaret on the throne and sings to her. Song: Danny sings "You're My Everything".
42	12	"Father of the Year"	Sheldon Leonard	Robert O'Brien & Irving Elinson	December 14, 1954
The Williams family are in an uproar when Danny wins the "Father of the Year" award and is slated to appear on a magazine cover.
43	13	"The Anna Maria Alberghetti Show"	Sheldon Leonard	Robert O'Brien & Irving Elinson	December 21, 1954
The Williams are visited by Anna Maria Alberghetti.
44	14	"The New Year's Show"	Sheldon Leonard	Robert O'Brien & Irving Elinson	December 28, 1954
Danny and Margaret try to spend a quiet New Year's Eve alone.
45	15	"Jesse's Romance"	Sheldon Leonard	Robert O'Brien & Irving Elinson	January 4, 1955
Danny and Margaret fix Jesse up with a female comedian. Irene Ryan.
46	16	"Terry Gets Her Own Room"	Sheldon Leonard	Robert O'Brien & Irving Elinson	January 11, 1955
Now that she's older, Terry persuades Danny and Margaret to find her a room of her own.
47	17	"Danny Goes on TV"	Sheldon Leonard	Robert O'Brien & Irving Elinson	January 18, 1955
There's much joy in the Williams' household when Danny lands an appearance on television.
48	18	"Terry's First Big Crush"	Sheldon Leonard	Robert O'Brien & Irving Elinson	January 25, 1955
Terry develops a crush on a French celebrity (Stephen Bekassy) staying with the Williams.
49	19	"The Children's Governess"	Sheldon Leonard	Mac Benoff	February 1, 1955
Margaret hires Miss Quincey (Norma Varden) as a governess for the children while she's in Boston with Danny for a week. Danny is very against it. The children think Margaret should've gotten her mother, Mrs. Summers (Nana Bryant), to watch them. Just then Grandma comes by, because she knew Margaret was leaving. She didn't know about the governess. Grandma decides to stay regardless. It's been four days and Miss Quincey is tired of Grandma letting the kids have the run of the house. When Danny and Margaret return, Miss Quincey complains about the complete lack of discipline. Margaret tells her mother that she does spoil the children. Mrs. Summers is hurt and leaves. Margaret has Miss Quincey stay on longer. The kids visit Grandma and would like her to come by soon. Grandma comes up with an idea. She suggests the kids follow everything Miss Quincey says and become too polite and grown up. They dress very proper. The kids would rather do their homework than play with their toys. They will not even play games. Danny and Margaret now regret having Miss Quincey around and Danny fires her. Margaret's mother reminds her what a wild kid she was when she was young.
50	20	"Daddy's Biography"	Sheldon Leonard	Mac Benoff	February 8, 1955
Terry makes Danny the topic of a composition. Hope Emerson.
51	21	"Danny Tries Real Estate"	Sheldon Leonard	Irving Elinson & Robert O'Brien	February 15, 1955
Danny considers a career in real estate. Joan Banks. George O'Hanlon.
52	22	"Rusty Gets a Haircut"	Sheldon Leonard	Mac Benoff	February 22, 1955
Danny and Benny are rehearsing and Benny is acting silly. Margaret tells Danny that Rusty is late coming home from school. Rusty comes home with a black eye and a bloody nose. Rusty says he was walking home when another boy called him a girl and Rusty hit him. The boy makes fun of Rusty's hair and calls him curly. Danny wants Rusty to get a short hair cut, but Margaret is against it. Margaret wants to have a talk with the boy. Danny, Benny and Rusty leave. Margaret calls Harry the Barber (Benny Rubin) and tells him to not cut Rusty's hair. Danny doesn't understand why Harry will not cut Rusty's hair. Danny reluctantly promises to not take Rusty to another barber. Margaret goes shopping and Danny tells Benny he will cut Rusty's hair. Rusty locks himself in a room. Danny tricks Rusty into coming out, but before Danny can do anything, Margaret comes home. Terry lets it's slip that Margaret called Harry. It's Rusty's bed time and Danny reminisces about when Rusty was younger. Danny decides against the hair cut. The next day Rusty comes home with a short hair cut.
53	23	"Terry's Teen-Age Birthday"	Sheldon Leonard	Mac Benoff	March 1, 1955
Terry is invited by a young man to celebrate her 13th birthday at a chic restaurant.
54	24	"Peter Pan"	Sheldon Leonard	Mac Benoff	March 8, 1955
Danny is in Toledo. Before bed, Margaret is talking to Rusty and Terry about Peter Pan. They had just seen the play. Rusty is pretending he can fly. The next morning, Danny comes home. He tells Margaret about the speech he gave to the young newspaper boys there. He now wants Rusty to learn the hard truths about life. Just then Rusty comes into the room pretending to fly. Rusty gets upset when Danny says he doesn't believe in fairies. It's been three days and Rusty is still pretending to fly. Danny goes to the theater where the play is showing. He meets Peter Kirby (Cecil Kellaway), the elderly stagehand. Danny would like Kirby to come over for dinner. He could then explain to Rusty how they make the actors fly using wires. That evening Peter meets Rusty. Rusty tells him about all his fantasies and how he doesn't want to grow up. Danny and Margaret come in the room. Instead of telling Rusty the truth, Kirby says he uses fairy dust to make Peter Pan fly. Kirby tells Rusty to stay a kid and not grow up and he leaves. Later, Danny goes to the theater and confronts Kirby. Kirby tells Danny that his profession also involves make believe and Danny understands. Song: Jean, and later Danny, sing "Neverland".
55	25	"The Piano Teacher"	Sheldon Leonard	Mac Benoff	March 22, 1955
Danny balks at paying for piano lessons for Rusty and Terry when it's quite evident that neither of them have any musical aptitude. Jay Novello as Piano Teacher.
56	26	"The Newspaperman Show"	Sheldon Leonard	Mac Benoff	March 29, 1955
Danny needs some publicity. He reaches out to journalist friend Bill Pearson (Hans Conried) to write an article about Danny and his family. When Bill visits Danny he gets an unexpected "scoop".
57	27	"The Philosopher"	Sheldon Leonard	Mac Benoff	April 5, 1955
Danny is asked to deliver a lecture for a philosophy class.
58	28	"The Father-Son Show"	Sheldon Leonard	Mac Benoff	April 12, 1955
Though Danny wants to spend more time with Rusty, he balks at appearing in a silly costume for a father and son show at Rusty's school.
59	29	"The Benefit Show"	Sheldon Leonard	Mac Benoff	April 19, 1955
Danny turns his back on a club owner who needs his help. Danny's conscience causes a nightmare about what might have transpired if Danny had lent a hand. Hy Averback. Dave Barry.
60	30	"A Trip to Wisconsin"	Sheldon Leonard	Henry Garson	April 26, 1955
Danny and the family are on a train going to Margaret's hometown of Baraboo, Wisconsin. Danny is not happy about spending his vacation there. They are going to visit with Will Finch (Will Wright) and his wife (Kathryn Card). The Finch's took care of Margaret for months at a time while her parents were traveling in vaudeville. It's Bazaar week there and Danny thinks they're going to ask him to entertain. The family arrives at the home and the Finch's are fawning over Margaret and the kids. Danny is being ignored. Danny tells the Finch's that he's a well known entertainer. They are not interested and keep calling Danny by different names. Mrs. Finch mentions the Bazaar and Danny says he's not available. She says she wanted to know if Margaret would be on the decorating committee. Will and Danny are sitting outside the General Store while the women are shopping. Will is whittling and asks if Danny would like to try it. Will goes home while Danny is whittling. Margaret and Terry head home. Rusty wants to look for arrowheads. Danny tells him to go with his mother. Later, they realize that Rusty isn't in the house and go out looking for him. Will brings Rusty home. The family comes home. Rusty tells them that he fell while looking for arrowheads and got stuck in a pile of rocks. The townspeople, the volunteer fire department and Will rescued him. Danny feels grateful and volunteers his services for the Bazaar. They ask him to judge the baking contest. Song: Danny, Jean, Will Wright and Kathryn Card sing "I'm in Favor of Friendship".

=== Season 3 (1955–56) ===
No. overall	No. in season	Title	Directed by	Written by	Original release date
61	1	"Davy Crockett"	Sheldon Leonard	Mac Benoff	September 13, 1955
In an effort to get closer to Rusty, who has become obsessed with Davy Crockett, Danny dons a Davy Crockett outfit to understand Rusty's latest fad. Frank Nelson.
62	2	"Little League"	Sheldon Leonard	Henry Garson	September 20, 1955
Rusty wants to play little league baseball. He hopes to join the local team, the Giants. The team needs a coach. Danny volunteers, but Rusty says the manager and the trainer are the ones who pick the coach. Danny decides to go speak with them. One of the men (Herb Vigran) tells Danny that Rusty didn't make the team. As far as coaching, they need a man with experience. George (John Hubbard) mentions he's had no luck in finding a ball field. Danny happens to own a vacant lot nearby. He makes a deal with the men to allow Rusty to play and he will be the coach and they can use the lot. Danny comes home very sore from coaching the team. The team loses their first game due to Rusty's very poor playing. Bill tells Danny that they have to cut three players and send them to the minors. They tell Danny he has to cut Rusty. Rusty tells Margaret and Terry that the team lost and he will try and play better next time. Danny comes home and tells Margaret that he has to cut Rusty. Danny starts to talk to Rusty and he knows what Danny is going to say. Rusty understands and is willing to go to the minors. The men come by and tell Danny they are replacing him and sending him to the minors. Danny says he's going to sell his lot, but the family talks him out of it. Song: Danny sings "(You've Gotta Have) Heart". Later, Jean, Sherry and Rusty sing the song as well.
63	3	"Margaret Goes Home to Mother"	Sheldon Leonard	Henry Garson	September 27, 1955
Margaret moves back home with mother (Nana Bryant) out of anger at Danny for not inviting her to attend his performance at the White House.
64	4	"Love Thy Neighbor"	Sheldon Leonard	Henry Garson	October 4, 1955
Terry plays peacekeeper between Danny and a new neighbor. Frank Faylen. Virginia Gregg.
65	5	"Rusty Gets a Job"	Sheldon Leonard	Henry Garson	October 11, 1955
Danny encourages Rusty to get a job as a paper boy, then misses the free time they spent together.
66	6	"Big Shot"	Sheldon Leonard	Henry Garson	October 18, 1955
Danny uses his status as a celebrity to get out of paying a traffic ticket.
67	7	"Danny's Palladium Offer"	Sheldon Leonard	Mac Benoff	October 25, 1955
After Danny's performance, Jesse tells him that he finally got Danny booked into the London Palladium. Holding out for Margaret and the kids expenses almost ruined the deal. Danny says he will not go without the family. It was a lifelong dream of Danny's to play the Palladium. The next morning, Rusty tells Louise that he was accepted into the Chippewa Club. His initiation is in three weeks. Margaret says that she was made the regional president of the PTA. There will be an announcement party in three weeks. Terry is happy because she was asked to go to the Junior Prom. The Prom is in three weeks. Danny comes in and says he will be headlining the Palladium in three weeks. The family tells him they cannot go. An upset Danny says he will go alone. Later, Danny is still upset and Rusty tries to cheer him up. Margaret and Terry also try. Rusty tells Louise that the club broke up and he will be able to go with Danny. Terry says she's through with Jimmy Burrows and will not be going to the Prom. Margaret postpones her installation as president. Not knowing the kids are available, Margaret bribes them into going with Danny. Danny comes home and says he was selfish, so he had Jesse cancel the Palladium. The family tells him they were available. Jesse tells the family if Danny doesn't play the Palladium, he will be sued. The family is going to England. Song: Danny sings "Learnin' the Blues".
68	8	"The London Palladium"	Sheldon Leonard	Mac Benoff	November 1, 1955
The family are off to London for Danny's huge gig at the Palladium. Because it's their first time on an airplane, the family's nerves are in tatters. Cecil Kellaway.
69	9	"Sonnets from the Lebanese"	Sheldon Leonard	Mac Benoff	November 8, 1955
Surrounded by English arts and letters, Danny dreams that he's Robert Browning and Margaret is Elizabeth Barrett Browning. Hans Conried as Innkeeper.
70	10	"High Society"	Sheldon Leonard	Mac Benoff	November 15, 1955
Danny and Margaret find themselves hobnobbing with the English aristocracy, as Danny prepares to perform at the Palladium.
71	11	"The Smugglers"	Sheldon Leonard	Mac Benoff	November 22, 1955
Rusty and Terry smuggle a kitten on the trip back home from England.
72	12	"Danny's Old Girlfriend"	Sheldon Leonard	Mac Benoff	November 29, 1955
Danny has a dream about how his life would have been if he hadn't married Margaret when he receives letters from old girlfriends.
73	13	"Louise's Surprise Party"	Sheldon Leonard	Mac Benoff	December 6, 1955
Misunderstandings abound when Louise thinks she's about to get fired, when in fact the family is planning a surprise party for her.
74	14	"Mr. Williams Goes Legit"	Sheldon Leonard	Mac Benoff	December 13, 1955
Danny lands a role in a stage play. He models himself after boxing champ Maxie Rosenbloom, who thinks that Danny is interested in becoming a boxer.
75	15	"Danny Strikes Oil"	Sheldon Leonard	Mac Benoff	December 20, 1955
Jesse offers Danny a chance to get in on an oil investment he's making on a tip from a Texas client. Danny gets buyer's remorse and is convinced he's going to lose all his money. Stanley Adams as Mathias J. Anderson.
76	16	"Terry's Party"	Sheldon Leonard	Mac Benoff	December 27, 1955
Terry and some of her friends are planning a party. They all agree that they will pay for it and run it all by themselves and with no help from their parents. Danny comes home and asks what they are doing. Terry says that Margaret gave her permission to let her and her friends have a party here on Saturday night. Danny wants to help by getting a combo from the club to play music, but the kids say they have a band. He will have the club prepare the food. The kids are not happy and leave. Later, Margaret tells Danny to not interfere. She says that some of the kids have said they are not coming. Terry comes home and tells Danny that more kids have canceled. Terry says Danny's ruined her life. One of the boys comes over and tells Terry they have decided to call the whole party off because of Danny butting in. Terry actually defends Danny. She tells Danny and Margaret that she's glad to learn what her friends are like. Danny says she should not be mad at her friends because he did butt in. Danny invites some of the kids to the malt shop. He gets them to understand why Terry is acting the way she is. The kids all come over to Terry's place and bring things for the party.
77	17	"The Songwriter"	Sheldon Leonard	Mac Benoff	January 17, 1956
Margaret writes a song she wants Danny to look at and he ends up getting sued for plagiarism.
78	18	"Star of the Family"	Sheldon Leonard	Mac Benoff	January 24, 1956
Margaret develops an inferiority complex when she realizes she is the only one in the family who has not won an award.
79	19	"Margaret's Cousin"	Sheldon Leonard	Mac Benoff	January 31, 1956
Margaret's mooching cousin, Carl (Hans Conried), comes for a visit. He then moves in and makes Danny very upset. Danny finally puts his foot down and tries to change Carl's character. The once lovable Carl becomes a hard worker, but he is no longer any fun. Danny finally gives in to Margaret and the kids and Carl becomes his old self.
80	20	"Like Father, Like Son"	Sheldon Leonard	Mac Benoff	February 7, 1956
Danny and Rusty share an evening of anxiety. Danny's opening a new act at the club the next night and Rusty has to recite the Gettysburg Address before his entire class the next day.
81	21	"Wyatt Earp Visits the Williamses"	Sheldon Leonard	Henry Garson	February 14, 1956
The Williams receive a visit from Hugh O'Brian, TV's Wyatt Earp. Johnny Crawford as Rusty's Friend.
82	22	"Who Can Figure Kids?"	Sheldon Leonard	Joel Kane	February 21, 1956
Danny picks out a song he wants Terry to sing at the audition for the school musical. Terry is not interested in auditioning. Margaret and Rusty come home from shopping. Terry tells her parents she doesn't want to be in show business. She wants to do something important for humanity. Danny is rehearsing at the club. Danny's old friend from vaudeville, Frank Martin (Wally Brown), comes by and the two reminisce. Frank brought with him his son Bob Martin (Arte Johnson) and his fiancée Ellen King (Diane Jergens). Danny remembers Bob when he was a kid. Danny invites them over for dinner the next night. Frank wants Bob to get into show business and would like Danny to listen to him. Frank is very pushy and Bob is a bit reluctant. Bob does perform and he's pretty good. The next day Bob and Ellen come by for dinner. Ellen thinks that Frank is forcing Bob into a career he didn't want to follow. Bob really wants to be a doctor. Frank comes by and Margaret and Danny try to diplomatically tell him that Bob has no love for show business. Bob does say he wants to be a doctor and Frank realizes it's the best thing for him. Danny now sees that he too has become a pushy theatrical father. Later, Terry tells him she does want to be in show business. Songs: Danny sings "Alice Blue Gown" and "September Song". Danny and Wally Brown sing "Down By The Ohio". Arte Johnson sings "So What".
83	23	"Terry and the Sorority"	Sheldon Leonard	Joel Kane	February 28, 1956
Terry wants to be accepted into the Psi Psi Psi sorority, the most exclusive sorority in the school, even though most of the other sororities want her. She is afraid she might not get accepted because her father is an entertainer rather than coming from a background of bankers, lawyers and the like. Meanwhile Uncle Toonoose, who has not seen Danny in years, comes over. Terry learns something about appreciating her family heritage. Susan Seaforth Hayes. Note: First appearance of Hans Conried as Uncle Tonoose.
84	24	"Danny and Jesse Split"	Sheldon Leonard	Joel Kane	March 6, 1956
When Jesse books more clients, Danny thinks he should be paying more attention to him and believes it's time for them to go their separate ways. Note: Singer Rusty Draper guest stars as himself.
85	25	"Terry Has a Date"	Sheldon Leonard	Jack Elinson & Charles Stewart	March 13, 1956
Terry goes out on a date with a 16-year-old boy (Richard Beymer). Dean Martin as Self.
86	26	"Don't Yell at Your Children"	Sheldon Leonard	Mac Benoff	March 20, 1956
Rusty is worried because he has to have Danny sign a slip due to his unsatisfactory work at school. Danny comes to the breakfast table feeling good. He gets upset when he sees the slip. Terry is being annoying and Margaret reprimands her. Danny yells at Terry. Danny and Margaret then yell at each other. They do kiss and make up. Margaret thinks they need to stop yelling at the kids and threaten them with punishment. They then practice speaking in a polite tone. Later, Rusty tries to quietly sneak into the house. Danny knows Rusty did something wrong but he's afraid to say what. Danny promises he will not punish Rusty. Rusty says he threw a baseball and broke the bakery's window. Danny really has to restrain himself. Rusty tells Terry that Danny didn't yell at him. Terry tells her parents she took Margaret's expensive perfume to school and all the girls used some. The bottle is empty. Margaret has to restrain herself. The kids do some other bad things to test them and Danny and Margaret keep calm. Terry tells Rusty their parents don't love them anymore. Danny and Margaret realize that the kids like it better when they yell.
87	27	"Coats and Boats"	Sheldon Leonard	Mac Benoff	March 27, 1956
Danny wants to spend his bonus on a boat, but Margaret wants to spend it on coats for the kids. Walter Woolf King as Drama Teacher.
88	28	"We're Going to Chicago"	Sheldon Leonard	Mac Benoff	April 3, 1956
Louise, the Williams' housekeeper, is troubled at Danny's announcement that the family are leaving New York for a new life in Chicago.
89	29	"Danny Goes on USO Tour"	Sheldon Leonard	Henry Garson	April 10, 1956
Danny is auditioning piano players to go with him on a USO tour in Japan. A hipster named Doug Adams (Peter Leeds) comes by. Danny can't quite pick up on Doug's "lingo". Danny tells Margaret that he will probably just cancel the tour. She suggests he ask Harry Ruby, but Danny thinks Harry will be too busy. Rusty brings by a Mr. Hofsteader (Billy Gilbert). Hofsteader is Rusty's friend Jimmy's piano teacher. His piano playing is very flamboyant and not Danny's style. Danny decides to go see Harry and ask if he knows anyone. Meanwhile, Harry tells his wife Ilene (Mabel Albertson) that he has nothing to do and feels useless. She suggests he volunteer for one of the USO tours. Margaret calls Harry and tells him Danny is coming by to ask him about the tour. Harry is now excited. Danny comes by and asks Harry if he knows anyone. Harry is now disappointed and asks Danny to leave. Margaret talks to Ilene and learns that Harry wanted to go on the tour. Margaret has a plan on how to get Danny and Harry together. They arrange to meet each other at a nightclub. At first Danny and Harry are just insulting each other. The Nightclub owner introduces the two and asks them to perform. Danny asks Harry to go on the tour and Harry says yes. Songs: Danny sings "When You're Smiling". Danny and Harry perform "So Long Oo-Long (How Long You Gonna Be Gone)".
90	30	"Danny's Birthday"	Sheldon Leonard	Henry Garson	April 17, 1956
Danny tells Ben that he wants to spend some time with the kids. Danny's birthday is coming up and he hopes the kids remembered. The kids come home and leave just as quickly. Margaret tells Danny that the kids went to see the new janitor. He's Captain Chris (Edgar Buchanan), an old retired sea captain. Chris tells them stories and has the boiler room set up like a ship. Terry tells Rusty that they should buy Chris a new sweater because his is torn. The kids show Danny the boat in a bottle that Chris made them. Danny and Margaret overhear the kids taking about the sweater and Danny thinks they're getting him one for his birthday. It's Danny's birthday and Margaret brings him breakfast in bed. She gives him a ring. Danny learns the kids forgot his birthday and the sweater is for Captain Chris. Danny knows he's competing for their attention. He takes the kids to the Palace Theater and shows them how interesting and fun show business is. Later, Danny tells Margaret that he doesn't think he got through to the kids. They give Danny a present in a show business style. Songs: Danny and Ben perform "My Blue Heaven". Jean sings "Happy Birthday to You". Danny sings "Roamin' In The Gloamin'", "Sonny Boy", "There's No Business Like Show Business". Note: This is a rerun of the episode originally telecast season 1, episode 8, November 17, 1953.

=== Season 4 (1956–57) ===
No. overall	No. in season	Title	Directed by	Written by	Original release date
91	1	"Boarding School"	Sheldon Leonard	Bill Manhoff	October 1, 1956
Danny told Terry (Sherry Jackson) and Rusty (Rusty Hamer) that they are being punished and can't watch TV for a week. Louise (Amanda Randolph) finds the two blindfolded in front of the TV with it on. Ben Lessy comes by and asks why they are being punished. Then Press Agent Liz O'Neill (Mary Wickes) brings Danny by in a wheelchair with his leg in a cast. After Margaret's death, Danny feels his children need more attention than he can give them on his own. He tells Liz he's decided boarding school is the best option. Dr. Paris (Virginia Gregg), from the boarding school, comes by. Danny explains why he thinks it would be best for the kids if they went to the school. Dr. Paris then meets the kids. Danny is a little surprised when Dr. Paris says she will take the kids away in an hour. Danny explains to the kids what is going to happen. After the kids are gone, Rusty's friend Charlie O'Hare comes by. When Charlie learns that Rusty is away, he wants to leave. Danny tries to get him to stay. Ben comes by and then Dr. Paris arrives with the kids. Rusty just came by to pick something up. It's obvious to Dr. Paris that the kids want to stay home and Danny wants them there as well.
92	2	"The Nelson Eddy Show"	Sheldon Leonard	Bill Manhoff	October 8, 1956
Danny is still hobbled with a broken leg and he's having a hard time finding someone to fill in for him at the club. Terry and Rusty give Danny a big head when they tell him no one else is good enough. But he comes down to Earth when the kids mention several other celebrities. Danny's agent, Jesse Leeds (Jesse White), comes by with a list of stars wanting to help out. Danny pretends he's not worried about someone showing him up. But he comes up with excuses why each wouldn't work. Because he doesn't think he would go over well, Danny suggests Nelson Eddy. Ben Lessy comes by and asks Danny why he turned down all the other comedians for Nelson. Nelson arrives and tells Danny he's surprised that Danny picked him. Terry comes in the room and doesn't know who Nelson is. Danny is sure that Nelson will be a flop at the club. It's the night of the show at the club. Nelson winds up being a huge hit and Danny is upset. Afterwards, something Nelson says stops Danny from telling him off. Later, Danny doesn't want to hear Rusty read all the great reviews Nelson got in the papers. George N. Neise as Emcee. Eddie Ryder as Danny's Sixth Sense. Earle Hagen as Danny's Bandleader.
93	3	"Problem Father"	Sheldon Leonard	Barbara Hammer	October 15, 1956
Danny does a routine for Liz, Louise and Benny about people with less intelligence. Terry comes in the room complaining about the undignified noise. Terry gets a phone call from Roger Haynes (Ray Stricklyn) that Danny answers. Terry is embarrassed by Danny. Roger is taking Terry to a formal dinner party at his parents house. Terry wonders why Danny always has to tells jokes, when Roger's parents are more cultured and refined. Roger comes to pick up Terry and Danny says Terry should be home by midnight. Terry is late and Liz tells Danny not to fly off the handle when she gets home. When they get home, Danny starts yelling at Roger. Terry is humiliated and starts crying. The next morning, Danny apologizes to Terry. He says he called the Haynes family and invited them to dinner. Terry is worried about what the Haynes' will think of her family. Danny agrees they will all act more refined. Mr. and Mrs. Haynes (Parley Baer and Peg LaCentra) arrive with Roger. Mr. Haynes starts to tell a joke and Roger stops him. It turns out that Mr. and Mrs. Haynes frequent night clubs and are big fans of Danny. Terry and Roger realize they overreacted and the evening turns out just fine.
94	4	"Be a Pal to Your Son"	Sheldon Leonard	Bill Manhoff	October 22, 1956
Danny is busy writing a song. Rusty and his friend Tommy Raskin are playing and it's bothering Danny. The boys are upset because Danny said he would take them to the movies, but he cannot now. Tommy tells Rusty that they should go play with Hal (Philip Ober), who is Tommy's father. Danny is surprised that Tommy calls his father by his first name. Hal comes by to meet Danny and tell him he's taking the boys to the zoo. Hal asks Danny to go along, but Danny says he's too busy. Hal tells Danny he's not being much of a pal to his son. Danny fantasizes that Rusty is taken in by a gold digger named Delilah (Ahna Capri). Rusty tells Danny that he fell for Delilah because Danny acted like a father and not a pal. Back to reality, Danny asks Louise if he spends enough time with Rusty. Danny tries to explain to Rusty that the type of work he's in just doesn't allow him a lot of free time. Danny promises to try to be more of a pal. Later, Rusty and Tommy come by. A boy named Stanley took some money from Tommy. Tommy is ashamed to tell his father that he didn't confront Stanley because he was afraid. Danny convinces Hal that there should be a happy medium between being a strong father and a fun pal.
95	5	"Den Mother"	Sheldon Leonard	Henry Garson	October 29, 1956
Danny is rehearsing with Benny. Rusty is working on some stunts for his Cub Scout Pack. He would like Danny to take an interest in what he is doing. Terry comes in the room in a beautiful dress and Danny and Benny compliment her. Rusty thinks that all Danny cares about is Terry. To prove what a good father he is, Rusty wants Danny to be Den Mother to his pack. Danny refuses, but after he sees Rusty's disappointment, he says yes. Rusty brings Danny to see some of the women who will decide on the Den Mother. They think Danny is crazy and Mrs. Albright is particularly condescending. Mrs. Shaffer (Shirley Mitchell) thinks they should vote on it later. Mrs. Albright comes by Danny's house to ask him to withdraw. Danny tries to explain why he's doing this for Rusty. Mrs. Albright says she wants to be Den Mother because she has no children. The other mothers wind up picking Danny. Danny finds a way for Mrs. Albright to be picked instead and she thanks him. Evelyn Scott as Mrs. Brown. Madge Meredith as Mrs. Jackson.
96	6	"Terry at the Crossroads"	Sheldon Leonard	Bill Manhoff	November 5, 1956
Terry has a date with Bob Sheppard (Gary Gray). Danny is surprised that she is dressed as a tomboy. She says that's her bowling outfit. Rusty teases her by saying she has a crush on Bob. Terry hopes that Bob will ask her to the Junior Prom. Bob comes by. Danny finds out that Terry can beat Bob at bowling, tennis and other sports. The next morning Danny learns that Bob didn't ask Terry to the prom. She acts as if she doesn't care. Liz comes by and Danny mentions that he's concerned about Terry becoming less feminine. Danny would like Liz to talk to her. Liz thinks that as a parent, Danny should talk to her. Danny tries to talk to Terry, but she thinks that it's not just a man's world. Danny tells Liz that he knows nothing about bringing up a girl. Bob comes by to pick up Terry for bowling. She comes in the room in a beautiful dress and says she would rather go to Coney Island. It seems Danny talk did some good. Song: Danny sings The Girl That I Marry.
97	7	"Danny Goes to Texas"	Sheldon Leonard	Henry Garson	November 12, 1956
Jesse Leeds comes by and tells Danny he got him a booking for a birthday party in Texas. Danny is not interested. It takes a bit of convincing, but Danny eventually agrees to go. Danny, Benny and Rusty arrive at a ranch, where they are told by Buck that they will be staying in a bunk house out back. Mrs. Enright (Minerva Urecal), who hired Danny, says that's where all the help stay. When Danny refuses, she says it's a long walk to the highway. Rusty is excited when Danny decides to stay. Mrs. Enright says she will be the only one in the audience. Danny tells Benny that there's got to be a way to get to the highway. Meanwhile, Mrs. Enright gives Rusty some cowboy clothes that her son used to wear. Her son Petey never came back from the war. Mrs. Enright says that the reason she hired Danny was because he was one of the last people to see her son. Danny entertained the troops in Italy and Petey was there. The birthday party she hired Danny for was for Petey. Mrs. Enright wants Danny to leave until he tells her a moving story. She decides to round up the neighbors and have the party.
98	8	"The Diary"	Sheldon Leonard	Arthur H. Dales	November 19, 1956
Benny and Danny are rehearsing. Benny tells him that Terry went out. Liz comes by and wants to know which picture Danny wants to use for a magazine article. Benny finds Terry's diary. Terry comes home saying she wishes she was dead, but she will not say what's wrong. Liz and Benny suggest that Danny look in her diary. Danny does look in the diary and feels really bad about it. Terry gets a call from Dick, who asks her to the dance. Now Terry is happy. Terry finds her diary and realizes someone looked in it. She thinks it was Rusty and calls him a worm. Liz and Benny think Danny should admit it was him. Danny fantasizes that he is in diary jail. He tells policemen Benny and Liz that Rusty read the diary. Benny and Liz are about to chop Rusty's head off. Danny admits he read the diary. Back to reality, Danny gives Terry a present and admits he read her diary. He explains that he only did it because he was worried about her. Danny also says he's sorry for letting Rusty take the blame. They both forgive Danny. Terry then tells him that the diary belonged to her friend Sandra. They were reading each others diaries.
99	9	"Talented Kid"	Sheldon Leonard	Arthur H. Dales	November 26, 1956
Danny, Liz and Benny are discussing a TV appearance Danny will be making. Danny wants Rusty to perform with him. Liz is worried because Rusty cannot sing. They are not even sure Rusty will want to be on TV. Rusty comes home and Danny asks him if he would like to be on TV. Rusty would rather play football. When Danny says he will make enough money to buy a football uniform, Rusty says he will do it. Rusty starts singing the song and he is pretty bad. No matter how much they work with Rusty, he doesn't get any better. Danny hurts Rusty's feelings when he says Rusty has no talent. Danny tells Liz to find another kid. Danny, Liz and Benny are auditioning kids. Danny's friend Chick (George O'Hanlon) brings in his son, Herbie (Barry Gordon). Herbie does a great job. Danny soon learns that Herbie isn't having much of a childhood because all he does is rehearse and perform. Danny tells Herbie and Rusty that they both have talent, just different kinds. Danny buys Rusty the football uniform. Tony Thomas as Billy, Child Singer. Note: Billy is played by Danny's real life son.
100	10	"Danny's Comeback"	Sheldon Leonard	Jack Elinson & Charles Stewart	December 3, 1956
The cast on Danny's leg has been taken off. Both Louise and Rusty mention to him that the doctor said he should move around more. But Danny just sits around. Danny's booking agent, Phil Brokaw (Sheldon Leonard) comes by and tells Danny that he got him a booking starting next Thursday. When Danny says he's not ready yet, Phil says he will just find someone else. Phil mentions several people that didn't give up the way Danny is. The next morning Liz comes by and gives Danny a hard time about not wanting to perform yet. She tells Danny that she will be doing publicity work for Yooky Schultz, the new talent that Phil found to take Danny's booking. Phil arrives and tells Liz and Danny that Benny will also be working with Yooky. It's the night of the opening and Phil tells Liz that he's sure Danny will show up to see Yooky. Danny does show up. Phil, Liz and Benny claim that Yooky chickened out and will not perform. Danny tells them that he's on to their scheme and that there never was a Yooky. Danny says he refuses to perform with his crutches and gets up to leave. Phil points out to Danny that he walked away and left his crutches at the table. Danny performs and is a big hit.
101	11	"My Fair Vocal Coach"	Sheldon Leonard	Henry Garson	December 10, 1956
Rusty entertains Elaine Bunson (Terry Saunders) in his room while she waits for Danny to come home. Danny and Liz arrive and she's trying to talk Danny into working with a vocal coach for an upcoming outdoor musical. Danny is against the idea. It turns out that Elaine is that coach. Danny changes his mind when he sees the attractive Elaine. At the first lesson, Elaine makes it clear that she's only interested in giving lessons, not romance. She tells Danny to take back the orchid and candy that were on the piano. They find out that Rusty put them there. Danny learns what an incredible voice Elaine has. He tells her she should be a star, not a teacher. Elaine says she can't have a career as she is a widow with a daughter to raise. Danny tells her he's a widower with two children. She says she's afraid and leaves. Danny brings Rudolf Benelman (Steven Geray), Victor Waingraft (John Wengraf) and Thomas Bingham (Philip Tonge) to his house. They are theater professionals, but Danny wants them to pretend to be friends and listen to Elaine sing. Elaine is not fooled and knows they're with the opera. She is mad and Rusty has her stay in his room. The men are about to leave. Something Rusty says convinces Elaine to sing for them and they think she's great. Song: Danny and Terry sing "If I Loved You".
102	12	"Pride Takes a Holiday"	Sheldon Leonard	Henry Garson	December 17, 1956
Rusty tells Danny that his Cub Scouts want to raise money for a youth house. Mr. Alter, the Scout leader, would like Danny to be in a benefit show. Terry comes home upset because she's not getting the recognition she thinks she deserves for her work on the girls club charity dance. Danny suggests that she resign from the club. Liz doesn't think that was good advice. Danny tells Terry that she should not let her pride stop her from helping. Danny talks to Mr. Alter and mentions some of the routines and songs he could do. Mr. Alter just wants Danny to be the Master of Ceremonies and introduce the acts. Mr. Alter wrote out exactly what he wants Danny to say. Danny would like to ad lib his introductions, but Mr. Alter insists he just read the cards. Danny tells Rusty he will not do the show. Terry tells Danny that the dance went well and she's glad she didn't let her pride get in the way. Danny now feels he has to do the Cub Scout show. During the show, Danny tries to do some ad libs, but Mr. Alter stops him.
103	13	"Christmas and Clowns"	Sheldon Leonard	Henry Garson	December 24, 1956
It will soon be Christmas. Rusty is writing down a list of the things he wants. Danny tries to tell him people are happier when they give and not receive. Rusty says he wants the people to be happy to give him things. Terry asks Danny who will coming for Christmas dinner. Danny wants it to be just family as this is their first Christmas without their mother. Officer Burton (Dick Wessel) comes by under the guise of warning Danny about burglars and Danny gives him his Christmas tip. Mike Kelly (George Tobias) delivers Danny's Christmas tree. Rusty learns that he was a clown in the circus, but the circus closed down. When Mike says he doesn't have a family, Rusty invites him over for Christmas. Mike says he will be spending that time with some of the other circus people. Rusty invites them as well. When Rusty assures him that Danny will be fine with it, Mike agrees. Terry tells Rusty that Danny doesn't want anyone over for Christmas. It's Christmas day and Rusty is trying to tell Danny about the circus people, but doesn't. Then Mike and his friends arrive. Danny finds out that Rusty invited them. Mike and the gang feel they're not wanted. After Rusty mentions the true meaning of Christmas, Danny decides to welcome the guests. They find Mike and the others had left. Officer Burton brings them back thinking they were burglars. Everything gets straightened out and they all have a great time.
104	14	"Liz's Boyfriend"	Sheldon Leonard	Bill Manhoff	December 31, 1956
Liz comes by all dressed up and in a great mood. Danny thinks she's drunk. Liz tells Danny she now has a man in her life, Rod Fowler (Fredd Wayne). Rod is a comedy writer. Liz agrees to bring him over that night. Liz and Rod arrive and Rod meets the family and Benny. Rod tells Danny he's been trying to get Danny to look at some of his material, but he can't get passed his agent. Rod keeps complimenting Danny. Liz starts to think that Rod is only going out with her so he can get Danny to use his material. Liz tells him to leave. The next morning, Terry suggests they find someone else for Liz. Terry thinks Mr. Shermahorn (Johnny Silver), who runs the news stand, would be perfect. Danny doesn't think they should get involved. That night, Benny tells Danny that he will ask Liz out. Danny says he's already found a man for her. Liz comes by and doesn't want to talk about her love life. John Savich (Richard Deacon), the man Danny got for Liz, arrives. Liz is upset that Danny interfered. Terry and Rusty show up with Mr. Shermahorn. Things become quite awkward. Danny apologizes to the men and they leave. Liz appreciates what they tried to do and she feels part of the family.
105	15	"The School Teacher"	Sheldon Leonard	Jack Elinson & Charles Stewart	January 7, 1957
Rusty wants to try out for the school glee club and he wants Benny's help. Rusty is not singing very well and Danny decides to help. Rusty says that he will sing the way his teacher Miss Lorraine Andrews (Monica Lewis) wants. Danny decides to have a talk with Miss Andrews. Danny is surprised at how pretty Lorraine is. Lorraine tells Danny that Rusty just doesn't have any natural talent for singing. Danny takes offense when Lorraine says there's a difference between night club singing and real singing. Danny challenges her to sing at the club he's performing at. He is a little surprised when she says she will be there. That night at the club, Danny tells Benny he doesn't think Lorraine will show up. Just then she arrives and tells Danny she will not sing. Danny apologizes for the way he acted that afternoon. They get into a disagreement once again about singers and Danny introduces her to the audience. She reluctantly goes on and does an incredible job singing. Lorraine then leaves. The next day Lorraine confesses to Danny that she worked her way through college singing in night clubs. Danny thinks she should sing professionally, but she wants to be a teacher. Danny feels bad for minimizing her job. Song: Monica Lewis sings "You Make Me Feel So Young".
106	16	"Danny's Date"	Sheldon Leonard	Jack Elinson & Charles Stewart	January 14, 1957
Terry and Rusty are surprised when Danny tells them he has a date with a Mary Rogers (Barbara Billingsley). She will be coming by soon and Danny goes to change his clothes. Rusty tells Terry that he doesn't want a new mother. The kids decide to not be nice to Mary. Mary arrives and the kids are rude and distant to her. Danny senses something is going on. He takes them into another room for a talk. Terry finds a way to make Danny feel guilty about going out with Mary and he winds up canceling the date. A week goes by and the kids try to spend as much time with Danny as they can. Liz comes by and asks Danny why he hasn't gone out with his friends. Liz says she talked to Mary. Danny has to go out on business and Liz stays there. Liz tells the kids off and says they have been being very selfish. They say they're doing it for Danny's own good. They haven't even seen their friends for a week. Danny comes home and Mary is there. The kids called her and had her come over. The kids insist Danny and Mary go out on a date.
107	17	"Girl from Iowa"	Sheldon Leonard	Henry Garson	January 21, 1957
Wilma Snell (Kathleen Nolan) finds a way to deliver some ties to Danny. She's from Iowa and wants to make it in show business, so she came to Danny for help. Danny says he's not an agent and he's not sure he can do anything. Wilma starts crying. Danny goes to see Phil Brokaw (Sheldon Leonard). Phil asks what does she do and Danny couldn't say as he forgot to ask her. Phil and Liz come by Danny's place and suggest that Danny is interested in Wilma romantically. Wilma comes by and performs for them. She isn't very good. After Phil and Liz leave, Wilma knows they were not impressed. Danny tries to let her down gently, but she says she can't go back home a failure. Danny convinces her to go back home and marry her boyfriend Harold. Another girl comes by asking Danny for his help getting in show business. He at first asks her to leave, but then he hears what a great singer she is. Song: Kathleen Nolan sings "Button Up Your Overcoat".
108	18	"Danny Goes Social"	Sheldon Leonard	Jack Elinson & Charles Stewart	January 28, 1957
Danny has been a night club performer for 15 years. Jeese reminds him that there will be anniversary dinner celebration the next night. High society Gloria Ridgely comes back stage to meet Danny. She brings with her Brad Phillips (John Hubbard). Gloria has been in the audience five days in a row. Gloria invites Danny to a champagne supper party the next night. Despite the anniversary dinner with his friends, Danny accepts. The next night, Liz, Jesse and Benny come to pick up Danny. They tease him because he's wearing a tuxedo. Danny asks if they could postpone the anniversary dinner because he's going to Gloria's party. They don't think Danny will fit in with the high society crowd and they refuse to change the date of their party. When Danny gets to Gloria's party, he's the only one in formal attire. Many of the guests think Danny is there to entertain. Gloria does ask him to entertain and he reluctantly agrees to. Danny does get back at Gloria by telling the audience that the fee he would normally get, will be donated by Gloria to a charity. Later, Danny arrives at the pizza parlor where Liz, Jesse and Benny are. They give him a little bit of a hard time and Danny admits they were right. Jacqueline deWit as Nick Radford. James Seay as Puff Radford. Tracey Roberts as Brenda. Sondra Rodgers as Jane Burgson. George N. Neise as Irving Burgson. Song: Danny sings "Back in Your Own Backyard".
109	19	"Lobster Story"	Sheldon Leonard	Bill Manhoff	February 4, 1957
After one of his shows, Violet Fensterwald (Madge Blake) asks Danny for an autographed picture. She mentions that she really likes one of his routines. Violet says Danny does it so much better then a comic named Frank Farmer at another club. Danny is upset that someone else stole his material. He and Benny go to the other club. Farmer's set doesn't go over with the audience. Danny recognizes Frank, who was a great burlesque comic at one time. He went by the name Farmer Jones back then. Danny tells Benny that Frank helped him when he was starting out. Frank comes to the table and tells Danny that he didn't steal the routine. Danny and Frank get into a disagreement and Danny says he will contact a lawyer. Danny talks to lawyer Mr. Shipley (Joseph Kearns) about his options. Shipley tells Danny, without proof of ownership, he doesn't have a case. Benny tells Danny that Frank was fired from the club and now Danny feels bad. Danny goes to see Frank. Danny tells him there's a whole new audience for his old Burlesque routine. Frank thinks Danny is just telling him that so he will stop using Danny's material and he tells him to leave. Danny and Benny go to see Frank's last show at the club. Frank does his Burlesque routine and it's a hit with the audience. Frank learns he's not being fired. Danny and Frank do a routine together.
110	20	"The Flashback Show"	Sheldon Leonard	Arthur Stander, Alan Lipscott, Bob Fisher, Jean Holloway & Mac Benoff	February 14, 1957
Danny cuts a performing trip short to come home. He tells Liz that today is his birthday. Danny says that the kids look forward to this day. The kids come home and quickly leave without mentioning Danny's birthday. Danny thinks they forgot his birthday. Danny flashes back to when Terry wanted to do things for him when her mother was away. They get into a little argument. To apologize, Danny has roses delivered to Terry. Back to the present, Rusty says he remembers what day it is, it's the day he's gets his allowance. Liz tells Danny that maybe Rusty wanted the money to buy him a gift. Danny flashes back to the time Rusty ran away from home. Rusty is at the police station. Danny arrives and Rusty tells the two policemen (Ernest Borgnine & Ray Kellogg) that he's never seen Danny before. The officers trick Rusty into thinking they are going to arrest and hang Danny. Rusty admits Danny is his father. Back to the present, Terry and Rusty come home with a package that Danny thinks is his present. They say it's a gift for Rusty. Danny flashes back to when he tried to show the kids that actors are important too. He took them to the Palace Theatre and described all the things that happened there. Back to the present, the kids come in the room with a birthday cake and presents. Song: Danny sings "There's No Business Like Show Business".
111	21	"Danny's Fiancée"	Sheldon Leonard	Laurence Marks	February 21, 1957
Danny comes back from a month long trip and brings with him June Richards (Ann Lee). He introduces June to Terry and Rusty. Terry takes Danny into another room and asks him why he brought June home. He says he met her a couple weeks ago and they hit it off right away. Terry asks him if he is in love with her. Terry tells Rusty that she thinks June doesn't like kids. Terry and Rusty tell Danny that they don't want him to get married. He tells them that's not their decision. Terry hopes to make Danny look bad in June's eyes. The kids put on an elaborate show about Danny making Rusty work for his room and board. That Danny hits them and drinks too much. June knows what they're up to and that they just want to scare her off. Something June says makes Danny realize they are not meant for each other.
112	22	"My Friend Harry"	Sheldon Leonard	Henry Garson	February 28, 1957
Danny tells Liz and Rusty that songwriter Harry Ruby is coming over. Danny says that there will be a TV special based on Harry's autobiography. Liz figures out that Danny wants to portray Harry in the special. Harry arrives and wants to ask Danny a favor. Danny thinks he's going to ask him to play the part. Turns out Harry wants Danny to sing the songs, but Tony Curtis will play the part. Danny gets upset and says that Tony is not right for the part. Danny begs Harry. Despite being friends, they exchange words and Harry leaves. Liz tells Danny he's being selfish. She convinces Danny to sing the songs. Danny sees Bob Hickey (Lawrence Dobkin), who is in charge of production. Bob says that Harry is being stubborn wanting Tony for the part. Bob says Tony isn't right and that Danny would be perfect. Bob tells Danny they will not do the show without him. Danny says that he will do it if Harry begs a little. Harry comes by and Danny is waiting for him to start begging. Instead, Harry says he's calling the whole production off. Danny winds up begging Harry again and he gets the part.
113	23	"Uncle Tonoose Pays a Visit"	Sheldon Leonard	Arthur Stander	March 7, 1957
Danny tells Rusty and Louise that he's having Peggy Curtis (Margaret Field) over for dinner and they are just good friends. Louise gives Danny a special delivery letter from Uncle Tonoose (Hans Conried). Peggy arrives. Danny mentions to her that Uncle Tonoose is always asking if Danny is married yet. And the family is always against him getting married. Just then Tonoose comes in with a woman named Sharifa (Muriel Landers). Tonoose says that Sharifa is Danny's new wife. Tonoose says that Peggy is too skinny and not strong enough to be a wife. Peggy feels uncomfortable, so Danny takes her home. When Danny gets back, he tries to explain to his Uncle that things are different here and one can't just arrange a marriage. Danny says that maybe Sharifa doesn't even want to marry him. And Danny's not happy about the way he treated Peggy. Tonoose feels very bad that Danny is ashamed of him. The next morning, Tonoose brings Peggy back to the house. Tonoose tells Danny that he's leaving because he's just an old sad man. They then learn that Sharifa actually loves Tonoose and wants to marry him. Suddenly Tonoose feels very good. After Tonoose suggests a double wedding, Peggy leaves.
114	24	"The Model"	Sheldon Leonard	Henry Garson	March 14, 1957
Danny tells Liz how proud he is of Terry doing so well in school. Terry comes home and tells Danny she wants to quit school to become a model. Danny is totally against it and the two have an argument. Danny comes up with an idea. He has a good friend named Harry Fishell (Dan Tobin), who owns a modeling agency. Danny tells Terry that she can go there and she is thrilled. He doesn't tell Terry that he knows Harry. Danny talks to Harry and some of the models and they agree to help change Terry's mind. Terry shows up to the agency and the models tell her how hard it is to get work. Harry asks Terry to see her legs and she is a little embarrassed. He tells her she has to lose weight and maybe in a year he can get her a job. At home, Terry tells Danny she's going to finish school. The models she met had nothing to eat and nothing to wear. Harry calls Danny and Terry picks up the phone. Terry gets upset when she figures out what happened. Danny pretends to call Harry and tell him to give Terry a job. Terry figures out that scheme as well. Later, Terry tells Danny that the Governor is on the phone. Danny thinks Terry is pranking him, but it's really the Governor. Joi Lansing as Blonde Model. Jean Howell as Receptionist. Song: Danny sings "Daddy's Little Girl".
115	25	"The Orphan Asylum"	Sheldon Leonard	Arthur Stander and S.L. Bershad	March 21, 1957
Danny is between bookings and doesn't know what to do with himself. Liz says he should just relax a little. Rusty tells Danny that the Principal of his school would like Danny to entertain at an awards party this Friday. Rusty tricks Danny into accepting. Danny gets a call to perform at the Sands, but it means he has to back out on his promise to Rusty. Rusty gets upset and says he might as well be an orphan. Danny finds a note from Rusty saying he's running away. Danny is about to go search for Rusty when a Mrs. Martin (Lurene Tuttle) comes by. She is from the Orphanage that Rusty applied to join. Mrs. Martin asks Danny why Rusty ran away and he explains what happened. Liz suggests that Danny go and pretend to adopt Rusty. Danny goes to the Orphanage and Rusty hides. Danny performs for the children. Danny uses a little psychology to get Rusty to want to go home. Tiger Fafara as Eddie - Boy at Orphanage. Song: Danny sings "It All Depends On You".
116	26	"Little League Umpire"	Sheldon Leonard	Jack Elinson & Charles Stewart	March 28, 1957
Danny and Rusty come home depressed because Rusty's Little League baseball team lost again. Danny blames the crooked umpire. Jesse comes by to discuss some business. Jesse can tell Danny is not paying attention. Danny tells Jesse that Rusty's team has lost 16 games in a row. Danny decides to become an umpire. Danny goes to see Mr. Simms (Ted de Corsia), the Head Umpire. Simms allows Danny to umpire Rusty's next game. Simms also talks about the integrity of being an umpire. Later, Jesse mentions Danny making the calls in Rusty's favor. Danny says that he will not do that, but they all think he will. After the game, the 2nd Base Umpire (Larry Thor) questioned some of Danny's calls. Danny didn't think all of the 2nd Base Umpire's calls were good. Danny learns that he is a Reverend. Danny feels bad that he called Rusty out on strikes. The Reverend says he did the right thing and that Rusty will just have to understand. When Danny gets home, Terry and Jesse are upset with him. Rusty actually understands that Danny wouldn't cheat. He is happy because his team set a Little League record for 17 losses in a row.
117	27	"Danny Meets Kathy"	Sheldon Leonard	Henry Garson	April 4, 1957
Danny comes back from a booking out of town early because Rusty is sick. Louise tells him that Terry is staying with friends. She says that a nurse is with Rusty in his room as he has the measles. Danny meets Kathy O'Hara (Marjorie Lord), the nurse. He wants to see Rusty, but Kathy will not let him in the room unless he's already had the measles. Danny can't remember for sure if he's had the measles. Kathy says that Dr. Ver Hagen (Steven Geray) will not allow it. Danny calls his Aunt Emily to see if she knows if he's had the measles. Danny is irritated with Kathy until she tells him that she is a big fan of his and she's seen him perform several times. Danny mentions how beautiful she is. Rusty tells Kathy and Liz that he'd really like to see his father. Kathy says she will be going out for a while, hinting to Liz that Danny could sneak up to see Rusty. Liz stops Danny from seeing his son. She tells him Kathy's plan and Danny stays where he is. Kathy comes back and is upset that she went out on a limb for Danny and he didn't take advantage of it. Dr. Ver Hagen comes by and says Danny can go see Rusty after he gives Danny a shot. Danny panics, but is given the shot. Just then, Aunt Emily calls and says that Danny had the measles when he was nine. Rusty is better, but he and Danny still want Kathy to stay. Dr. Ver Hagen says she has the measles now and should stay. Song: Danny sings "But Beautiful".
118	28	"Men Are Men"	Sheldon Leonard	Henry Garson	April 11, 1957
Kathy is over the measles, which she had caught from Rusty. Rusty is sad that she will be leaving. Louise says that Kathy cannot stay here forever as she has a little girl of her own to take care of. Danny thinks that Rusty had a fight with his friend Ruthie (Ahna Capri) and that's why he's sad. When Rusty reminds him that Kathy is leaving, Danny becomes sad. Louise asks Danny when he's going to ask Kathy out on a date. Danny says that the male of the species always comes out victorious. Danny and Rusty bring Kathy breakfast in bed and Danny makes a mess. Louise tells Kathy what Danny said. Kathy decides to play hard-to-get. Meanwhile, Ruthie tells Danny she's not sure why Rusty lost interest in her. Ruthie asks Rusty who the other woman is. She wants to return the steady ring Rusty gave her. Danny introduces Ruthie to Kathy. Kathy gives Ruthie advice on how to get Rusty back and it works. Danny asks Kathy out and she turns him down. Danny manages to trick Kathy into going out with him. Song: Danny sings "I Only Have Eyes For You".
119	29	"Little Miss Moppet"	Sheldon Leonard	Henry Garson	April 18, 1957
Danny has invited Kathy and her little daughter Linda over to meet his family. Louise teases Danny about him and Kathy getting married. Terry wants to give Linda one of her old dolls. Kathy and Linda arrive and Linda is acting very shy. Everyone tries to get Linda to open up a little. Rusty takes her to his room to play. Linda asks Rusty about his boxing gloves and she winds up punching Rusty a couple times. Linda makes a mess in his room with a fan and the feathers from a pillow. Danny comes in the room and gets mad at Rusty when Linda denies making the mess. Danny tells Rusty to pick up all the feathers. Danny takes Linda to help Terry in the kitchen. Linda gets cream cheese spread over her and Terry's dress. Linda then blames Terry. Danny says his children would not lie and Kathy says the same thing about Linda. Danny and Kathy get into an argument. Kathy takes Linda to Rusty's room to clean her up. Kathy starts crying. Linda goes to Danny and admits she did everything because she's afraid that he will take Kathy away from her. Danny, Rusty and Terry make Linda feel wanted and Kathy overhears the whole thing. Danny and Kathy make up. Song: Danny sings "I've Grown Accustomed To Her Face".
120	30	"Danny's Proposal"	Sheldon Leonard	Bill Manhoff	April 25, 1957
Danny, Louise and the kids are entertaining Kathy. They find out what a nice dancer Kathy is. Later while the kids and Louise are cleaning up, Terry mentions that she wished she knew more about Kathy. There's a good chance that Danny and Kathy could get married. Terry and Rusty go to Kathy's house. Under the guise of writing a term paper, Terry asks Kathy several questions about how she feels about certain family matters. Kathy figures out that they want to know what kind of a stepmother she would be. Kathy says that Danny has not even asked her to marry him. They will have to wait and see what happens. Kathy tells Danny that the kids are going to try to get him to propose. He thinks Kathy put them up to it and Kathy gets upset. They have a little argument and Kathy storms out. Louise tells Danny to go apologize. Danny takes to kids to go see Kathy. They all ask her forgiveness. Then the kids try to help Danny propose. The kids leave the room and Danny sings his proposal to Kathy. She then proposes to him.

=== Season 5 (1957–58) ===
No. overall	No. in season	Title	Directed by	Written by	Original release date
121	1	"Lose Me in Las Vegas"	Sheldon Leonard	Arthur Stander	October 7, 1957
Danny and Kathy are honeymooning in Las Vegas. Danny runs into old friend Harry Marvel (Les Tremayne). Danny introduces his two children and Kathy's daughter Linda (Angela Cartwright) to Harry. Harry is surprised Danny brought the children with on the honeymoon. Harry then meets Kathy. Harry thinks Danny will be performing at a big benefit that evening. He says a lot of stars will be there. Danny says he will not be performing. Later, Danny goes to get his car keys and leaves the family waiting in the car. After a while the family goes to look for him and find him entertaining a crowd of people. Danny apologizes and says it will not happen again. But it does happen again when the family goes to Hoover Dam. That night, the family goes to the benefit. Danny is introduced by the MC and the crowd begs him to perform. Despite promising Kathy he wouldn't, Danny goes on stage. Kathy sees how much the people are enjoying Danny's routine. When Danny gets back to the table, the family is gone. Kathy comes back saying she put the kids to bed. She says that she understands that he had to perform. Jack Benny as Self. Peter Lind Hayes as Self. Mary Healy as Self. Herb Vigran as Charlie. George N. Neise as George the Waiter. Earl Wilson as Self. Song: Danny sings "Let Me Sing and I'm Happy".
122	2	"Terry vs. Kathy"	Sheldon Leonard	Charles Stewart & Jack Elinson	October 14, 1957
Danny, Kathy and the family return from the honeymoon. They notice that Kathy is still outside the doorway. She wants to be carried over the threshold. Louise asks how the honeymoon was. Terry tells Danny and Kathy which closets to use. She then tells Rusty and Linda to get cleaned up for dinner. Rusty tells her that she's not running the house anymore. Kathy can sense that Terry is not going to give up running the house without a fight. Kathy tells Danny that he will have to have a talk with Terry. When Danny goes to talk to Terry, she asks him to have a talk with Kathy. Danny finally puts his foot down with Terry and she storms out of the room. Kathy asks Terry how Danny likes his clothes cleaned and what kind of food he prefers. Terry lies and tells Kathy the opposite of what Danny likes. Later when Danny complains about his clothes and the food, Kathy realizes that Terry set her up. Kathy doesn't say that Terry told her how to do it, but her and Danny get into a fight. Terry admits that it's all her fault and starts to cry. Terry and Kathy agree to work together. Song: Danny sings "My Blue Heaven".
123	3	"Kathy Is Approved"	Sheldon Leonard	Arthur Stander	October 21, 1957
Danny receives a telegram, but he's asleep. Kathy and Rusty are dying to find out what it says, so they make enough noise to wake Danny up. Danny opens the telegram and it states that Uncle Tonoose is arriving today. Danny figures he's coming to inspect Kathy. Kathy is a little upset that she is being looked over for approval. Danny gives Kathy a few tips on what to do. Danny picks up Tonoose and tries to talk up Kathy. Tonoose meets Linda and says he likes her very much. Things don't go well when Kathy meets Tonoose. Danny tries to make Kathy feel better and that doesn't go well. During dinner, things are awkward and Tonoose keeps making comments about Kathy. Terry has had enough and tells off Tonoose. Rusty then stands up for Kathy. Danny tells Tonoose that he loves Kathy and anything Tonoose says doesn't matter. Tonoose says that is exactly what he was hoping Danny would do, to stand up for his wife. Tonoose officially makes Kathy a member of the family in his own special way. Song: Danny sings "Day by Day".
124	4	"The Dinah Shore Show"	Sheldon Leonard	Charles Stewart & Jack Elinson	October 28, 1957
Kathy tells Danny she sang with a band once. Danny down plays her as a singer. He says she would freeze in front of a real audience. Terry and her friend Peggy Conroy (Eilene Janssen) want Danny's advice. They need a singer for their school dance, they already have a band. Danny says he will try and come up with someone. After they hear her sing, the girls ask Kathy to do it. She agrees if they do not tell Danny. Meanwhile, Danny runs into Dinah Shore. She says that her daughter's school needs a comedian. Danny agrees to be the comedian if she is the singer for Terry's school. Danny comes home with Dinah and tells Terry and Peggy that Dinah agreed to sing. Danny and Dinah are surprised when the girls are not thrilled. Without mentioning Kathy, the girls say they can't use Dinah. When Danny tells Kathy what the girls did, she says the girls were just being loyal to a mother they found to sing. Without mentioning that she is the mother, Kathy says that she will get Terry to change her mind. At the dance, Danny and Dinah find out it was Kathy that was supposed to sing. Dinah makes her go out to sing and Kathy freezes up. John Holland as Floor Manager. Songs: Marjorie Lord sings "It Had to Be You". Dinah sings "The Kiss That Rocked The World", "Goody Goody", "I'm Gonna Sit Right Down and Write Myself a Letter" and "I'll Never Say 'Never Again' Again".
125	5	"Parents Are Pigeons"	Sheldon Leonard	Charles Stewart & Jack Elinson	November 4, 1957
Danny is fawning over Linda and Rusty is getting very annoyed. Rusty starts acting up and Danny gets mad at him. Kathy tells Danny that Rusty just wants some attention as well, but Danny is still mad. Danny goes to talk to Rusty. He tells Rusty that he's just paying more attention to Linda because he wants her to know that he loves her. Danny tells Rusty that Kathy has been fussing over him for the same reason. It's bed time, but Rusty manipulates Kathy into giving him another piece of cake. Rusty tells Linda that if they work together, they will be able to get anything they want from Danny and Kathy. Rusty will ask Kathy for things and Linda will ask Danny for things. Rusty's plan works. It's not long before Kathy and Danny argue over spoiling the kids. Terry explains to them how Rusty and Linda are manipulating them. Danny and Kathy don't think that the kids are that smart. But then when the kids ask for more things, Danny and Kathy finally catch on to their game. Despite figuring it out, Danny and Kathy still get the kids what they wanted. Songs: Danny sings "Ain't We Got Fun". Angela Cartwright sings "School Days".
126	6	"Two Sleepy People"	Sheldon Leonard	Robert O'Brien & Irving Elinson	November 11, 1957
Danny is performing at the club. Kathy is in the audience with friends, Dr. Herman ver Hagen (Steven Geray) and his wife Sue (Virginia Gregg). Sue tells Herman that it's getting late and they need to go. Kathy mentions how her and Danny have for days been going out after his shows. Kathy tells Sue how tired she is. Kathy doesn't want to be a stick in the mud when Danny is so full of energy. Back in the dressing room, Danny tells Herman how tired he is. Danny doesn't want Kathy to know that Dr. Herman is even giving him vitamin shots. Danny tells Herman he doesn't want Kathy to know he can't keep up with her. The next morning, a tired Danny offers to make the kid's breakfast. Kathy finds out that he gave Rusty money for him and Linda to go eat in a restaurant. But Kathy is too tired to make the breakfast and lets Rusty keep the money. Danny and Kathy go back to bed. Danny is supposed to play golf with Herman and Kathy is to play tennis with Sue. Danny asks Herman if he could go sleep at his house instead of playing golf. Separately, Sue says instead of tennis, Kathy should go sleep at her place. Danny and Kathy eventually run into each other in the ver Hagen's bedroom. They each realize that they can't keep up that non-stop lifestyle. Song: Danny sings "The Birth of the Blues".
127	7	"Danny Meets His Father-in-Law"	Sheldon Leonard	Bill Davenport & Jim Fritzell	November 18, 1957
Kathy is worried about Danny meeting her father, Mr. Daly (William Demarest), for the first time. Kathy says to not get upset by anything her father might say. Mr. Daly arrives and Kathy introduces him to Rusty. He right away makes fun of what Danny's wearing. Mr. Daly was away on a 3-month trip when Kathy and Danny got married. He's not happy they didn't wait till he could be there. Rusty senses that Mr. Daly doesn't like Danny. Kathy puts the kids to bed and Danny and Mr. Daly have an awkward conversation. Mr. Daly talks up one of Kathy's old boyfriends who was a doctor. He asks Danny about his profession. Danny does one of his routines and Mr. Daly is not impressed. Danny learns that Mr. Daly likes to fish. Danny tells Kathy he's going to find out all he can about fishing so he can impress her father. Danny rattles off some fishing statistics, but Mr. Daly can tell he doesn't know what he's talking about. Rusty doesn't understand why Danny lets Mr. Daly insult him like that. Danny tries to explain that Mr. Daly is Kathy's father and he deserves respect. Something else Rusty says causes Danny to tell off Mr. Daly. That is exactly what Mr. Daly hoped Danny would do and he has a new found respect for Danny.
128	8	"Honesty Is the Best Policy"	Sheldon Leonard	Bill Davenport & Jim Fritzell	November 25, 1957
Rusty comes home and tells Danny and Kathy he found a wallet in front of the apartment house next door. Danny checks and there's no identification inside. There are just the initials R J T on the outside. Danny tells Rusty he needs to make an honest effort to find out who the wallet belongs to. Kathy says Rusty might even get a reward. Danny and Rusty go to the apartment and find the home of R. J. Titus (Larry J. Blake). Titus describes the wallet and they give it to him. Titus thanks Rusty and shakes his hand. Rusty is upset that he didn't get a reward, but Danny reminds him he did the right thing. Back at home, Kathy asks how much was the reward. When she hears he received nothing, Kathy gets upset. The next day, Danny comes up with a plan to make Rusty feel better. He knows Rusty is coming home, so he places his wallet by the elevator. He wants Rusty to find it and Danny will give him a reward. Rusty comes home and says nothing about the wallet. Danny and Kathy think he's keeping it. Just as Danny presses Rusty to give his wallet back, Earl the Elevator Operator (Joe Conley) comes by and returns Danny's wallet. Earl comes right out and asks for a reward. Rusty wants to know why it was OK for Earl to do it, but it's not right for him. Just then Titus comes by. Titus gives Rusty a season pass to the football game. Rusty turns it down, but after something that Titus says, Rusty accepts the gift. Song: Danny sings "You'll Never Know".
129	9	"Terry, the Breadwinner"	Sheldon Leonard	Robert O'Brien & Irving Elinson	December 2, 1957
Terry is excited about her new part time job in a dress shop. But she's concerned about what Danny will say. Kathy says she will help break it to him. But before she can tell Danny, Linda blurts out that Terry got a job. Danny reluctantly allows Terry to take the job. Danny says he will get people from the club to shop at the store, but Terry doesn't want his help. Kathy tells Danny that Terry wants to chip in for the rent. Terry comes home for lunch on her first day at work. She tells Danny and Kathy that she didn't get to help anyone. Doris (Sandra Gould), an aggressive co-worker, manages to get to the customers before Terry has a chance. Terry still doesn't want any help from anyone in the family. Danny sends Alysse (Joi Lansing), a girl from the Copa, to the shop, in order for Terry to make a large sale. But Doris got to Alysse before Terry had a chance. Danny tries to disguise himself and goes to the store. Terry recognizes him right away. Danny meets Doris. Terry has a problem with an irate customer (Connie Gilchrist). Danny tries to stick up for Terry and Miss Allman (Barbara Luddy), the owner, shows up. Miss Allman is glad when the woman leaves as she is a constant complainer. Even Miss Allman recognizes Danny. She gives Danny some sound advice about Terry.
130	10	"The Non-Orgs"	Sheldon Leonard	Jack Elinson & Charles Stewart	December 9, 1957
Terry and her friend Peggy are very depressed. Danny asks what's wrong. They say they were turned down by an exclusive sorority at their high school. Terry says she was refused membership because her father is in show business. That is considered lower-class by the snobbish social club. Peggy tells Danny that she was accepted but she turned them down because of Terry. Peggy didn't tell Terry and asks Danny not to say anything. The next day, Terry is still upset. She gets a call from Peggy saying that the sorority had second thoughts when they learned that Danny is very popular. A committee will be coming by to look the family over. Danny is against the idea, but he and the family get dressed up. Bobbie (Donna Corcoran), Chris and Nick, the membership committee, arrive. The three girls are at first not that impressed. But then Danny gets a call telling him he will be doing benefit at Madison Square Garden with Pat Boone. Now the girls are sure Terry will be accepted. Terry is going to the sorority pledge dance with Freddie Baxter (Richard Beymer). Peggy comes by and says that she will not be joining the sorority as she was turned down. Freddie comes by and he's quite the snob, so Danny kicks him out. Terry decides to not join the sorority because they didn't take Peggy. Song: Danny sings "Save Your Sorrow (For Tomorrow)".
131	11	"The Soap Box Derby"	Sheldon Leonard	Bill Davenport & Jim Fritzell	December 16, 1957
Danny is preventing Kathy from cleaning the house because he has nothing to do. Kathy tells him he needs a hobby. Kathy's father Mr. Daly comes by for a visit. Linda and Rusty come home. Rusty tells Danny he wants to enter the Soap Box Derby. He needs $15 for parts to build the cart. Danny tells Rusty that this will be his project and he has to build it all by himself. Mr. Daly says he remembers when he built his own cart. Danny and Mr. Daly want to go watch Rusty do the building. They both agree to not help Rusty. Despite what they agreed to, the men get into an argument over how the cart should be built. Rusty has had enough and leaves. The men finally decide to each build their own cart. They finish their carts and make a bet on which one Rusty will pick. A Police Officer (Robert Foulk) brings to two back to the house after they caused problems while they were testing their carts on the street. Kathy shows the men the rule book that states the contestant must build the cart by themselves. Rusty shows the men the cart he built himself with money that Kathy gave him. Danny and Mr. Daly get in trouble with the Policeman again when they race Rusty. Song: Danny sings "Love In A Home".
132	12	"Man's Best Friend"	Sheldon Leonard	Henry Garson	December 23, 1957
Danny and Benny are doing a bit together at the club. Danny then brings out Bob Carter (Regis Toomey) and his dog Willy. Bob has Willy do a lot of cute tricks. After the show, Bob tells Danny and Benny that he's quitting show business. It's just to hard to get bookings. Bob wants to find a good home for Willy. Bob is very happy when Danny says he will take the dog for Rusty. Rusty is thrilled. Danny reminds Rusty that Willy is his responsibility. Danny tries to get Willy to do some tricks, but the dog just lays there. Later, Bob comes by to check on Willy and Rusty can see how excited Willy is to see Bob. Rusty can also tell how much Bob loves Willy. Later, Rusty starts acting as if he doesn't like the dog anymore. Danny is very disappointed with Rusty. Danny has Bob come and get Willy and says he will have to find Willy another home. Bob says he made a mistake and will keep Willy. Danny realizes that Rusty acted the way he did on purpose in order to reunite Bob and Willy. Danny, Kathy and Benny each get Rusty a dog.
133	13	"The Chess Game"	Sheldon Leonard	Arthur Stander	December 30, 1957
Kathy's Uncle Sean O'Hara (Tom Tully) is coming to visit. Kathy confesses to Danny that she told Sean that he was Irish. Uncle Sean arrives and can immediately tell that Danny isn't Irish. Sean tells Danny that he's playing a game of chess with his old foe Paddy McCormick (Harry Shannon), who is in Ireland. They play by mail and Sean is facing a checkmate in two moves. Danny says it's only a game. Sean says that he's always been a failure and Paddy always did better than him. Paddy also married Peggy, a girl Sean always cared for. Sean has been trying to find something that he could beat Paddy at. Danny suggests that to get out of losing the chess game, Danny will send word back to Paddy that Sean has died. Sean actually likes the idea. Danny gets a cable stating that Paddy is coming to attend Sean's funeral. Sean is now upset with Danny, but then he begs Danny to think of something. Paddy arrives and Danny tells him that there will not be a wake. Sean drowned and they couldn't find the body. Paddy admits that Sean always got the better of him and he hoped to finally win with the chess game. Sean reveals himself and the two make up. Song: Danny sings "It's the Same Old Shillelagh".
134	14	"The Bob Hope Show"	Sheldon Leonard	Jack Elinson & Charles Stewart	January 6, 1958
Danny is trying to rehearse a song for an upcoming TV show for the Heart Fund, but he keeps getting interrupted. Rusty comes home and says he's quitting the football team because they didn't make him the quarterback. Danny tells him that just because you're not the main guy, you cannot quit. Later, Danny tells Liz he needs a guest star for the TV show. Liz says she got Bob Hope. Danny now thinks Bob will steal the show. Danny fantasizes about Bob spending the whole show telling jokes and all Danny had time to say was good night. Liz tells Danny that Bob will not even do a monologue and they will be doing a sketch together. Danny gets upset when Liz says that Bob's writers will be punching up the sketch. Danny fantasizes about the sketch. Bob gets to work with leading lady Gloria (Joan Tabor) and Danny has the small part of the butler. Danny tells Liz to get him out of the show. Rusty comes home and tells the family that he did play football and his team won. He decided to play because of what Danny told him. Liz and Bob come by and Danny says he will do the show. Bob says he only wants a small part in the show and that Danny is the star. The family is watching the benefit on TV and Bob manages to steal the show. Song: Danny sings "I Went Merrily Merrily On My Way".
135	15	"Evil Eye Schultz"	Sheldon Leonard	Arthur Stander	January 13, 1958
Danny and Kathy are at Lindy's Restaurant. Kathy asks him if he's nervous about the opening of his show at the Copacabana that night. Suddenly, Danny hides under the table. Danny is afraid to see or be served by Oscar 'Evil Eye' Schultz (Marvin Kaplan), a waiter there. Danny tells Kathy that Schultz has a reputation for jinxing the opening performances of those he serves. Kathy is surprised that Danny is so superstitious. Charlie the Mait're D (Paul Dubov) comes by the table and apologizes that Schultz was around. Back at home, Danny is helping Linda rehearse her lead part in the kindergarten play of Little Red Riding Hood. Just then, Schultz is at the door. Kathy tells Danny she invited him over. Schultz tells them how lonely he is, because everyone thinks he's a jinx. Kathy thinks that if Schultz went to Danny's show and Danny was a hit, people will stop thinking he's a jinx. Schultz thanks Kathy for trying and he leaves. Kathy talks a reluctant Danny into inviting Schultz to the show. Danny's show is a hit. The next day, Schultz comes by to thank Danny. Linda comes home saying she forgot all her lines in the play. Danny now worries about the jinx again. Linda confesses to Schultz and the others that she didn't learn her lines. Song: Danny sings "I'm Looking Over a Four Leaf Clover".
136	16	"The Honeymoon"	Sheldon Leonard	Bill Davenport & Jim Fritzell	January 20, 1958
Danny goes to Lindy's Restaurant and runs into waiter Oscar Schultz, aka Evil Eye. Oscar tells Danny that he's getting married this Sunday to a woman named Estelle. She is a widow with two children. Oscar is looking forward to taking the kids with on the honeymoon. Danny tells Oscar that taking the kids with will ruin the honeymoon and he knows from past experience. Danny flashes back to his honeymoon in Las Vegas. He wants to be alone with Kathy but the kids want to go to Hoover Dam, fishing and horseback riding. Despite his objection, he winds up doing those things. Danny then tells Oscar about how on one of the nights they put the kids to bed hoping to be alone. Danny goes to get some champagne. When he gets back, he and Kathy try to be very quiet, but then Linda has a coughing spell. They have to put Linda in their bed. Danny winds up sleeping on the couch. Back to the present and Oscar agrees to not take the kids with. Kathy comes by and says how well she got to know Danny because they took the kids on the honeymoon. Sheldon Leonard as Man with Cigar. Song: Danny sings "Wiegenlied (Lullaby) Op. 49 No. 4".
137	17	"The Raffle Tickets"	Sheldon Leonard	Arthur Stander	January 27, 1958
Kathy is having a den mothers meeting at her house. Mrs. Greenson (Doris Singleton) tells the ladies that the cub scout that sells the most raffle tickets will win a bicycle. Mrs. Greenson brags that her son Tommy will sell the most tickets. Danny is there and tells Mrs. Greenson that Rusty will sell more tickets than her son. Later, Rusty tells Danny that Tommy is definitely going to win. Danny is upset that Rusty has no drive. When Rusty fails to sell any tickets, Danny tries to give him some pointers. Danny then comes up with the idea to use his nightclub act to sell the tickets. Rusty winds up selling over 31 books of tickets. Kathy is not happy about what Danny did. Tommy comes by and says he's sold almost 30 books. Tommy also mentions how hard and tirelessly he worked to sell his tickets. Danny now realizes that he gave Rusty an unfair advantage. Danny has a talk with Rusty. Rusty borrows some money from Danny so he can buy enough tickets from Tommy so that Tommy will win. Danny tells Rusty how proud of him he is. Rusty winds up winning a TV and trades it to Tommy for the bicycle. Song: Danny sings "Ac-Cent-Tchu-Ate the Positive".
138	18	"Rusty, the Bully"	Sheldon Leonard	Charles Stewart & Jack Elinson	February 3, 1958
Rusty comes home with a black eye. He got into a fight with Johnny Stewart, the school bully. Danny is upset that Rusty didn't hit back and defend himself. Danny takes Rusty to his gym where he wants to have fighter Max Baer teach Rusty to box. To show Rusty some moves, Max spars with Danny. Danny gets a little banged up. Kathy tells Liz that Rusty's been working with Max everyday for the last two weeks. Kathy is not really happy about it. Rusty tells Danny that he put Johnny in his place. Mrs. Beckett (Amzie Strickland) comes by with her son Gregory. She says that Rusty hit her son for no reason. Rusty is also apparently hitting several other little boys. He's become the school bully. Danny tries to explain to Rusty that he only wanted him to be able to defend himself, not be a bully. Max tries to tell Rusty the same thing, but Rusty doesn't believe him. Danny pulls a trick on Max that convinces Rusty to not be a bully. Johnny Indrisano as Boxer In Gymnasium. Song: Danny sings "Jeepers Creepers".
139	19	"St. Vincent's Frolics"	Sheldon Leonard	Jack Elinson & Charles Stewart	February 10, 1958
Danny returns from an entertainment tour and brings presents for Rusty, Linda and Louise. Kathy wants to know where her present is and Danny gives it to her. Danny mentions that he has no bookings for two weeks. He's looking forward to staying home and relaxing for a while. Kathy tells Danny that Dr. Barnes (Grandon Rhodes), from the hospital where she used to work, called. He would like her to do her specialty act at the St. Vincent's annual charity frolics. Danny is afraid they want him to perform. Kathy says they want him to be the director and producer. At first Danny doesn't want to do it. But when he changes his mind, Kathy tells him she already told Barnes he'd do it. Danny has some of the staff audition and there isn't much talent. Danny even has Kathy audition. When her performance is a little risqué, Danny says she's out. Back at home, Kathy tells Danny she's had complaints about how he's running the show. Danny comes up with a valid point to Barnes and the staff why he's taking the show so seriously. Danny resigns but the staff now want him to continue. The show is a hit, but the paper gives someone else the credit. Sandra Gould as Nurse. Johnny Silver as Doctor. Songs: Frances Osborne sings "A Bird in a Gilded Cage". Marjorie Lord sings "Put the Blame on Mame".
140	20	"Pardon My Accent"	Sheldon Leonard	Robert O'Brien & Irving Elinson	February 17, 1958
Kathy shows Danny how messy Rusty's room is. She wants Danny to discipline Rusty. But when Danny is about to do that, Kathy stops him. Rusty gives Danny a note from his teacher. The PTA has selected Rusty as one of this years Character Award winners. Rusty got his award for neatness. The school is having an awards ceremony and the fathers are invited to say a few words. Peter Lorenzo (Johnny Crawford) comes by to see Rusty. Peter got an award for Best Elocution. Later, Rusty asks Danny if he could speak for Peter as well. Peter's father isn't going to the ceremony. Kathy sweet talks Danny into going to see Mr. Lorenzo (Jay Novello). Danny goes to the shoe repair shop Mr. Lorenzo owns. He finds out the real reason the father isn't attending. Mr. Lorenzo cannot speak English very well. If Mr. Lorenzo agrees to come to the ceremony, Danny will speak for him. Danny gives a touching speech on emigrants at the ceremony. Because of that, Mr. Lorenzo decides to speak for himself. Bill Erwin as Emcee.
141	21	"Terry's Crush"	Sheldon Leonard	Jack Elinson & Charles Stewart	February 24, 1958
Terry's classmate, Donald Cooper (Tommy Ivo), helps Kathy beat Danny at a game of Gin Rummy. Donald is waiting for Terry to come home. Danny overreacts when Donald mentions that he had Terry out past midnight while bird-watching. After Donald leaves, Danny worries about Terry spending too much time with boys. Terry comes home. Danny and Kathy learn that Terry has a crush on Dean Martin. Now Danny wants Terry to spend more time with Donald. Danny tries to give Donald some tips on how to be more appealing to Terry, but it doesn't work. Danny brings Dean home with hopes that they can get Terry uninterested in Dean. Danny has Dean act and look less attractive. Terry sees through their little scheme. Dean has another idea. Dean starts making advances toward Terry as if he really wanted to be with her. That backfires on Dean when she likes his advances. Turns out Terry saw through Dean's scheme as well and was just putting him on. Terry says she can have a crush on Dean and still have Donald as her boyfriend. Song: Dean sings "I Don't Know Why (I Just Do)".
142	22	"Uncle Tonoose Meets Mr. Daly"	Sheldon Leonard	Arthur Stander	March 3, 1958
Kathy's father, Mr. Daly, is over for a visit. Kathy tells him that Uncle Tonoose (Hans Conried) will be visiting as well. Kathy wants her father to share a room with Tonoose so they can get to know each other. Tonoose arrives and he and Daly hit it off right away. It's not long before they start arguing over who was luckier to meet who, Danny or Kathy. They refuse to sleep in the same room. Danny and Kathy get into an argument, but quickly make up. They come up with a plan to make it look as though they really fought and maybe Daly and Tonoose will bond to bring them back together. Daly and Tonoose apologize to each other, but then start fighting again. Kathy comes up with a plan to each agree with Daly and Tonoose who the lucky one was. But that plan backfires as well. Danny and Kathy have had enough and each tell Daly and Tonoose to leave. That brings the two men together and Danny and Kathy realize the men are happy when they argue with each other. Songs: Danny sings "Can't We Talk It Over" and "Home! Sweet Home!".
143	23	"Danny Roars Again"	Sheldon Leonard	Charles Stewart & Jack Elinson	March 10, 1958
Danny has a lot going on and he's irritable and he's yelling a lot. Kathy says he doesn't need to be such a grouch. Doctor ver Hagen (Steven Geray) comes by and tells Danny how wonderful his show the other night was. Doc asks Danny if he could borrow one of his golf clubs. Kathy tells ver Hagen how much yelling Danny is doing and she feels a failure as a wife. She wonders if Danny still loves her. Doc says when Danny stops yelling, then you have to worry. Doc asks Danny if he'd like to be married to himself. Danny fantasizes that he is Kathy and she is him. He sees what it's like to be yelled at all the time. Back to reality, Danny decides he wouldn't like to be yelled at like that. Now when things go wrong around the house, Danny is calm and cool. This goes on for a week. Louise is even surprised at the change in Danny. Kathy realizes she's grown accustomed to his yelling. Kathy and Louise come up with a plan to get Danny yelling again, but it doesn't work. Thinking Danny may be sick, Kathy has ver Hagen come by. Doc finds a way to get Danny yelling again. Song: Danny sings "Try a Little Tenderness".
144	24	"The Country Girl"	Sheldon Leonard	Charles Stewart & Jack Elinson	March 17, 1958
Danny and Benny are in a roadside restaurant in Rock Ridge, West Virginia. They need a girl singer for their show. The one they had was offered a job by a TV producer and Danny let her take it. Judd Hooper (Chick Chandler), the owner, says his wife Elsie (Judy Canova) is a good singer. Judd brings Elsie out and she sings for them. Danny and Benny are quite impressed and offer her a job. While flattered, Elsie says she couldn't leave Judd to run the place by himself. Danny is back at home talking to Kathy when Elsie suddenly shows up. She decided she wants to sing in Danny's show. Kathy offers to let Elsie stay in Terry's room. Elsie mentions how she's written to Judd, but she has yet to hear back from him. Kathy gets the impression there isn't much love in Elsie's marriage. That night at the club Danny introduces Elsie. She dedicates a love song to Judd. The audience loves her. After the show, Judd shows up. He heard her sing and congratulates her. Danny gets Judd to say that he needs Elsie and that's just what she wanted to hear. Songs: Judy Canova sings "Just Because", "I Can't Give You Anything but Love, Baby" and "I Don't Know Why (I Just Do)". Danny sings "Smile, Darn Ya, Smile!". Benny sings "Mississippi Mud".
145	25	"Good Old Days"	Sheldon Leonard	Bill Davenport & Jim Fritzell	March 24, 1958
Danny and Kathy come home to find Terry, Peggy Conroy and a band rehearsing in the living room. Terry says they are practicing for a PTA show. Danny is against the modern music and the way Terry was dancing. Kathy thinks Danny is being old fashioned. Later, Terry and Peggy come by and Terry runs to her room crying. Peggy tells Danny that her father, Principal Conroy (Richard Deacon), didn't like the music either and cancelled the show. Peggy feels bad because of all the work Terry did. Now Danny defends the rock & roll music and the dancing. Danny confronts Conroy and calls him narrow-minded. Conroy says he's responsible for the children's moral guidance. They can do the show with different music. Peggy mentions to Danny that she found her father's raccoon coat and ukulele in the attic. Danny comes up with an idea to still put on the show. Danny has Conroy sit through the band playing some up-beat music from the 1920s. And the kids are going the wild burlesque dance steps from back then. Peggy tells her father that the burlesque dress she's wearing belonged to her mother. Danny gets Conroy to change his mind about the kids show. Anthony 'Scooter' Teague as Student Performer. Songs: Bill Hollingsworth's Dixie-Small Fry perform "The Charleston". Anthony 'Scooter' Teague with Bill Hollingsworth's Dixie-Small Fry perform "Sweet Georgia Brown". Eilene Janssen with Bill Hollingsworth's Dixie-Small Fry perform "I Wish I Could Shimmy Like My Sister Kate".
146	26	"Terry's Coach"	Sheldon Leonard	Ed Simmons	March 31, 1958
Terry is having trouble learning her part in The Merchant of Venice. She says she could really use a coach. Danny tries to help her but he isn't doing so well. Rusty brings a Derek Campbell (Hans Conried) to the house. Rusty says Derek is a Shakespearean drama coach that he found in the park. Danny is skeptical of the man's qualifications. Danny tells Derek that he is also an actor and he will coach Terry. Terry and Kathy are clearly impressed with Derek. Danny gives in and lets Derek coach Terry. It's been 4 days and Derek has been staying at the house and eating his meals there. Danny is a little envious of the way the kids look up to Derek. He is also upset with the way Derek talks down to him. Danny gets a special delivery letter from the Boston Globe. Danny was looking into some of Derek's acting claims. Derek becomes a bit anxious and asks if he can give Terry one more bit of coaching before Danny reveals what's in the letter. Danny is moved by what Derek's says and then reads the glowing review of one of Derek's performances in the letter. Later, Derek thanks Danny for not revealing what the letter actually said. Turns out Derek isn't really an actor, but is actually a homeless beggar. Kathy does wind up giving a good performance. Song: Danny sings "Lullaby of Broadway".
147	27	"Make Room for Father-in-Law"	Sheldon Leonard	Charles Stewart & Jack Elinson	April 7, 1958
Mr. Daly is visiting the family for a couple days in between construction jobs. Kathy tells him she wishes he could stay longer. Danny comes home and Mr. Daly gives him a hard time about how easy Danny's job is. Daly also gives Danny a hard time about the money he spends instead of saving it. Daly gets a call they have hired someone younger. Daly starts to call other people about a job. After several days of unsuccessful phone calls, Danny is worried about Daly. His father-in-law is not insulting show-business or hollering at him. Danny comes up with a plan to make Mr. Daly believe the family needs him as a business manager to handle their finances. Danny's plan works but also backfires. Daly puts Danny on a budget, he wants power of attorney and no one can sign checks but him. Danny cannot afford cigars and the food budget has been trimmed. Danny finally tells Kathy that they have to tell her father he's not their business manager anymore. Danny wants Kathy to tell him. Danny and Kathy get excited when Daly says he's invested their money in a stock that has tripled in value. When Daly calls the broker to sell the shares, he learns the stock has crashed. Daly is going to leave and the family learns to stock shot up even higher than before. Daly even gets his construction job back.
148	28	"Family Ties"	Sheldon Leonard	Bill Davenport & Jim Fritzell	April 21, 1958
Kathy comes home and Danny has his booking agent Phil Brokaw (Sheldon Leonard) over. Danny tells Kathy that Rusty is being punished and he was sent to his room. Rusty complains to Kathy that Danny makes him take Linda with wherever he goes. Danny told Rusty that family should stick together. Kathy agrees with Rusty and says she will talk to Danny. Rusty says talking to him will not do any good. Danny and Phil are setting up a poker game for that evening. Kathy comes up with a plan. She insists on going to the poker game. Things are very awkward for the other guys when Kathy shows up to the game. The guys are very annoyed when Kathy wins big. The next day Danny makes Rusty take Linda with when he goes to play baseball. Now Kathy insists that Danny go with her to a baby shower. Danny complains to Phil that for the last ten days Kathy has dragged him with to all her woman functions. Kathy finally gets Danny to agree that Rusty doesn't have to take Linda with him everywhere. Benny Baker as Poker Player. Robert Carson as Poker Player. Song: Danny sings "You're My Everything".
149	29	"Rusty, the Man"	Sheldon Leonard	Jack Elinson & Charles Stewart	April 28, 1958
Rusty needs a dollar from Danny. Danny asks him what happened to his allowance he got yesterday. Rusty says he lent it to a friend. Danny tells Rusty that when he was a kid, he had to earn his money. To prove to Danny that he's not a baby, he's going to get a job. Rusty looks through the paper for a job. He then puts a notice on a supermarket bulletin board. Rusty gets a job carrying packages at the supermarket, but due to Danny interfering, things don't go well. Rusty decides to shine shoes on the street corner. He makes Linda promise to not say anything, but she tells Danny right away. Danny doesn't want Rusty working on the street. Kathy suggests that they just go and watch him from afar to make sure he's OK. Danny and Kathy see Rusty just finishing a man's shoes when another shoeshine boy (Bobby Clark) comes by. The boy tells Rusty that his father left the family years ago. His family relies on his income for groceries. Rusty gives the boy his earnings. What Rusty didn't know is that his act of generosity is witnessed by Kathy and Danny. Danny pretends they just showed up. He tells Rusty that he has earned his respect and says he's become a man. Later, Rusty has Linda help him sell flowers.
150	30	"Terry's Girlfriend"	Sheldon Leonard	Jack Elinson & Charles Stewart	May 5, 1958
Danny cannot believe how unfeminine Terry dressed for a date. Danny is expecting a woman dancer to come by for a production number at the club. A Connie Coleman (Denise Alexander) comes by, but she turns out to be a friend of Terry's. Connie is dressed quite sophisticated and is very uppity. Danny thinks she's the woman he's expecting and he starts dancing with her. Danny is quite embarrassed when he learns she's Terry's friend. Terry spends a lot of time with Connie and Danny is not happy about it. Terry starts dressing very fancy and is putting on airs. Terry was going to spend the weekend at Connie's house. Danny's plan to get Terry to stay home backfires when Terry invites Connie to stay with her. An incidence at a restaurant with the two girls gets Danny even more mad. Danny and Kathy meet Howard (James Seay) and Harriet Coleman (Amzie Strickland), Connie's parents. They learn that the Colemans are globe trotters and care very little about their daughter. Connie mentions she likes being in the Williams household because of the love, care and concern shown to the children. Danny's views towards Connie change and he insists she stay the rest of the weekend. Danny urges the Colemans to pay greater attention to their daughter. Joey Forman as Man at Lunch. Eddie Ryder as Man At Lunch.
151	31	"You Gotta Be Miserable to Be Happy"	Sheldon Leonard	Bill Manhoff and Leonard Burns	May 12, 1958
Danny tells Kathy that Liz is coming by with a girl dancer for his act. Danny tells her she has nothing to worry about. Danny gets worried when Liz comes by and says the woman she hired is beautiful. Dawn DuBois (Georgine Darcy) comes by and she is gorgeous. Kathy meets Dawn and is very polite to her. Danny tells Liz that Kathy was putting on an act and is probably very jealous. Liz doesn't believe that Kathy is jealous at all. Danny has Liz bring Kathy by to a rehearsal where Dawn dances while Danny sings. Danny gets a little irritated and disappointed that Kathy doesn't seem to be jealous one bit. Liz is enjoying that she was right. Danny starts to feel old and unattractive. Kathy senses something is wrong with Danny. Liz tells Kathy that Danny's ego is hurt because she isn't jealous of Dawn. Danny gets excited when at another rehearsal, Kathy starts to become very jealous. What Danny doesn't know is that it was all an act or was it? Song: Danny sings "Around the World".
152	32	"Too Good for Words"	Sheldon Leonard	Roland MacLane and Dick Conway	May 19, 1958
Danny reads an article in the paper written by hard nosed columnist Beverly King (Joan Tompkins). Beverly absolutely roasts comedian Billy Gordon and his family. Linda asks Danny for her own TV and Rusty wants a motor scooter. Danny turns both of them down. Liz comes by and tells Danny that she had no choice when Beverly asked to do a story on him. Liz says that Beverly will spend a week observing him and the family. Liz brings Beverly by the house and she meets Kathy, Rusty and Linda. Beverly tells Liz that she hopes to actually write a nice article about Danny because she heard he's no phony. Danny comes home with gifts for the family and is acting overly nice. Kathy tells Danny that he's over doing the nice act and he should just be himself. Beverly calls her editor and says that Danny is the biggest phony she's ever met. She is disappointed because she was hoping to write a nice article. Rusty and Linda try to use Danny's nice act to get the TV and motor scooter. Danny gets upset with the kids and starts to yell at them. He tells Beverly that he's tired of acting nice for her. Beverly is very happy Danny is finally acting like himself and actually writes a nice article. Song: Danny sings "What'll I Do".

=== Season 6 (1958–59) ===
No. overall	No. in season	Title	Directed by	Written by	Original release date
153	1	"Jack Benny Takes Danny's Job"	Sheldon Leonard	Jack Elinson & Charles Stewart	October 6, 1958
Rusty comes home and reminds Danny and Kathy that it's time for the annual Cub Scout show. Danny is sure he will be asked to MC for the third consecutive year and he is annoyed. Danny is surprised and a little upset when Rusty says they got someone else. Rusty tells him they got Jack Benny to do the show. Rusty was the one who went to his hotel room to ask him. Danny says Jack is only doing it because Rusty is Danny's son. Rusty says tickets are selling faster than ever before. Danny goes to see Jack to tell him he doesn't need to feel obligated to do the show. Danny gets upset when Jack says he would love to do it. Jack has been rehearsing for three days with the scouts. Jack comes by and tells Danny he doesn't want to fight and Danny should do the show. Danny appreciates the gesture, but he says Jack should do the show and they make up. But then Danny gets upset when Jack says he's going to do a song with Rusty that Danny usually did. Jack gives Danny a very small part in the show and he's not happy. It's the night of the show. Jack introduces Danny and Danny is about to tell him off. But Jack has some kinds words for Danny and Rusty gives Danny a gold plaque from the Scouts. Eddie Ryder as Hotel Worker. Song: Jack sings "Down By The Old Mill Stream".
154	2	"Rusty, the Ward-Heeler"	Sheldon Leonard	Arthur Stander and David Adler	October 13, 1958
Rusty tells Danny that he's been nominated for class president. But Rusty doesn't think he will be elected because he's running against Joey Weber. Danny tells him that an underdog can win. Rusty needs to do some campaigning. Danny suggests that Rusty hold a rally with refreshments and entertainment. Rusty talks Danny into paying for everything and being the entertainment. Kathy gets upset because Rusty is not going to win on merit, he's 'buying' his votes with cake and ice cream. Later, Danny does a comedy club act about Kathy being against the way Rusty is running his campaign. In a very subtle way, Kathy almost gets Danny to call the Principal and tell him Rusty is withdrawing from the race. Rusty comes home and says several of his classmates say he's definitely going to win. Rusty suggests they throw a rally for his cub scouts and he could be elected patrol leader. And they could do the same for his baseball team and he could be elected captain. Danny now knows that Kathy was right. Danny has a talk with Rusty about winning on merit. Rusty suggests that they throw a rally for Joey to make things fair. That backfires when two more candidates are nominated and Danny has to throw two more rallies. Song: Danny sings "This Is A Very Special Day".
155	3	"First Anniversary"	Sheldon Leonard	Jack Elinson & Charles Stewart	October 20, 1958
It's Danny and Kathy's first wedding anniversary. Mr. Daly (William Demarest) is there to help to celebrate. Danny opens the champagne and makes a toast. Mr. Daly then makes a toast about Danny proposing to Kathy. Danny says that it was Kathy who proposed, but she disagrees. Mr. Daly sides with Danny. Kathy gets upset and leaves the room. Danny wants to apologize to Kathy. Mr. Daly doesn't think he should do it and Louise thinks he should. Kathy's been in her room for three hours. Danny is starting to agree with Mr. Daly that Kathy needs to apologize. Kathy comes out in a negligee, gets a magazine and goes back to her room. Danny wants to surrender. Mr. Daly ruins things and Kathy makes Danny sleep in another room. The next morning, Danny flashes back to when Terry and Rusty try to get him to propose to Kathy. Danny sings his proposal to Kathy and she then asks him to marry her. Back to the present, and they realize that they both proposed to each other.
156	4	"Terry Goes Steady"	Sheldon Leonard	David Adler and Arthur Stander	October 27, 1958
Danny gets worried when he reads an article about teens running away to get married. Terry comes home with Walter (Tommy Ivo), who she's going to do homework with. Danny now wants to talk with Walter to find out more about him. Kathy thinks Danny is overreacting. When Danny finds out that Walter wants to be a doctor, he's not as worried anymore. He figures Walter will be away at school for a long time. Terry is relieved when Danny tells her he likes Walter. Terry says she's glad as they're going steady. Danny now panics and kicks Walter out. Terry tells Danny that going steady has nothing to do with getting married. Terry is worried because when word of this gets out, she will never get another boyfriend. To try and make things right, Danny apologizes to Walter. Danny and Walter are surprised when Terry comes home with a boy named David. Terry says she's now going steady with David. David and Walter are actually friends. Both boys leave. Something Danny says makes Terry forgive him. Terry and Walter get back together. Song: Danny sings "Be Kind To Your Parents". Note: Final appearance of Sherry Jackson as Terry, and Terry's only appearance in season 6.
157	5	"Take a Message"	Sheldon Leonard	Arthur Stander	November 3, 1958
Kathy forgets to tell Danny that he has a business luncheon date with some friends. Kathy feels bad and promises to write down every message from now on. Bernice Fox (Helen Parrish) calls Kathy and says her and her husband would like to make a $10,000 donation to St. Jude Children's Hospital. Bernice would like Kathy and Danny to come over for dinner the next evening where they will present Danny with the check. Kathy is about to write down the message when she gets another phone call. Kathy then leaves the house without writing down the message. The next night after the family has lasagna for dinner, Kathy suddenly remembers the dinner invitation. Kathy can't remember the name of the woman who called. She does know the name was a type of animal. When Danny mentions the Wolfs, Kathy thinks that was the name. Ed Wolf (Byron Foulger) and his wife (Claire Carleton) are surprised when Danny and Kathy show up expecting dinner. They wind up having lasagna as well. Danny puts Ed on the spot when he mentions the $10,000 check. Kathy then remembers Bernice Fox's name. Meanwhile, George Fox (James Seay) wonders why Danny and Kathy are almost 2 hours late. They then arrive and George gives Danny his check. Bernice says they are having lasagna for dinner.
158	6	"A Locket for Linda"	Sheldon Leonard	William Cowley & Peggy Chantler	November 10, 1958
Rusty asks Danny to sing a song and then he compliments Danny on the way he sang it. This then leads up to Rusty asking Danny for $15 for a model airplane. Danny turns him down. Linda shows Danny a loose tooth she has. Linda wishes for a gold locket from the tooth fairy. Danny says he's sure she will get it. Rusty is now upset that Linda gets whatever she wants but he doesn't. Rusty tries to talk Linda into wishing for a model airplane, but it doesn't work. Kathy wants Danny to pull Linda's tooth out, but he's afraid to do it. Later, Linda takes the tooth out herself. Linda describes the tooth fairy to Rusty. Rusty tricks Linda into not telling Danny or Kathy about the tooth. That way she will not get the locket and she will learn there is no fairy. Rusty feels bad about what he did and confesses to Danny and Kathy. They go to check on Linda. She is sleeping and is wearing the locket. When Rusty finds the model airplane, he thinks the fairy gave it to him. Danny tells him that he bought the plane. Songs: Danny sings "Wishing (Will Make It So)" and "Scarlet Ribbons (For Her Hair)".
159	7	"Danny the Performer"	Sheldon Leonard	Arthur Stander	November 17, 1958
Despite Rusty's objections, Danny made him go watch a case being tried in court. Rusty comes home and is very impressed with his friend Charlie's father, prominent attorney Mr. Schneiderhoff. Danny wanted Rusty to be impressed by the court proceedings, not Charlie's father. Rusty says Charlie's lucky to have a father who is a lawyer. Kathy tries to tell Rusty that Danny's job is important too and he should be proud of Danny. Danny wants to invite Rusty's friends to the club to see him perform. Kathy tells Danny he should not be jealous of Schneiderhoff. When Rusty says he wishes Danny was a lawyer as well, Kathy goes along with Danny's idea. Rusty is very excited and goes to tell his friends. Danny is now worried he will not be good enough. During Danny's club performance, he talks about growing up in Toledo, Ohio. After the performance, Rusty and his friends come to Danny's dressing room. They all say how much they enjoyed the show. Danny learns that Rusty's raving about Charlie's father was all an act to get Danny to entertain for his friends. Tony Thomas as Rusty's Friend. Songs: Danny sings "When the Red, Red Robin (Comes Bob, Bob, Bobbin' Along)" and "We're Strong For Toledo". Note: This episode was produced for Season 5 and included on that DVD release.
160	8	"Uncle Tonoose's Fling"	Sheldon Leonard	David Adler	November 24, 1958
Uncle Tonoose arrives for a visit. As the family matchmaker, Tonoose is happy that he has married off his last single relative. Kathy thinks that Tonoose is actually sad as he has no more purpose in life. Danny and Kathy are surprised when Tonoose announces that he wants to lead the life of a playboy. Tonoose wants Danny to introduce him to some chorus girls. Danny thinks Tonoose is too old for that sort of thing. Kathy sides with Tonoose. Danny talks to Gloria Duncan (Joyce Jameson), a chorus girl friend of his. He would like her to go out with Tonoose a couple times because Danny knows she wouldn't hurt him. As a favor to Danny, she will do it. Tonoose and Gloria go out quite a few times and Kathy wonders how he can stay out so late every night. Tonoose comes home one night and tells Danny and Kathy that he thinks Gloria really likes him. He's decided she can marry him. Danny and Kathy come up with a plan to make Tonoose realize that he can't keep up with younger people. The plan backfires when Danny, Kathy and Gloria can't keep up with Tonoose. Tonoose gets a letter from Cousin Victor who has six old maid daughters that need his help. Tonoose is excited that he has a purpose again. Tonoose apologizes to Gloria because he has to leave. The others are surprised when Tonoose says that Gloria is too old for him anyway. Songs: Danny sings "September Song". "Sabre Dance" is played while Uncle Tonoose dances.
161	9	"Linda's Tonsils"	Sheldon Leonard	Charles Stewart & Jack Elinson	December 1, 1958
Linda needs to have her tonsils removed, but she doesn't want to. Kathy tries to tell her it will be very easy, but Rusty keeps making it sound as though it's painful. Meanwhile, Danny is performing in Boston. Kathy calls Danny and Linda tells him she wants him to come home. Despite Danny telling her he cannot because he's working, Danny comes home. Doctor ver Hagen (Steven Geray) comes by to see Linda, but she will not open her mouth for him. Danny thinks he has a way to get Linda to cooperate, but it doesn't work. Danny learns that Red Skelton is filling in for him in Boston and Danny is not happy. The next day, Linda says her tonsils don't hurt anymore because they fell out. Doctor ver Hagen comes back. While trying to show Linda it doesn't hurt when he looks in someone's mouth, Doc learns that Danny's tonsils need to come out. Linda says she will go to the hospital and have the operation if Danny does it as well. Danny tells Kathy and ver Hagen that he will go with Linda to the hospital, but then he's leaving for Boston. At the hospital, something Linda does shames Danny into having his operation. Song: Danny sings "It All Depends On You".
162	10	"Dinah Shore and Danny Are Rivals"	Sheldon Leonard	Jack Elinson & Charles Stewart	December 8, 1958
Danny is panicking because he needs a finish to the act for the big opening he's having at the Copa. He's worried because on the same night the Stardust Room is having a Hollywood celebrity opening. Meanwhile, Rusty is given boxes of cookies to sell from a man at school (Patrick Waltz). Rusty meets a new girl named Melissa Montgomery. Danny comes by to pick up Rusty. Just then Dinah Shore walks in. She's in town for a couple weeks. Dinah is picking up her daughter Melissa. Danny learns that Dinah is the person opening at the Stardust. Now a rivalry develops between Danny and Dinah. And it spills over to Rusty and Melissa about who can sell more cookies. Danny is going with Rusty to sell the cookies and winds up at Henry (Byron Foulger) and Martha Miller's (Shirley Mitchell) apartment. Henry is thrilled to see a celebrity such as Danny. Just then, Dinah and Melissa show up. To hopefully sell the cookies, Dinah flirts with Henry and Danny flirts with Martha. After a while, Danny and Dinah notice Rusty and Melissa are gone. They find out that the kids worked as a team and sold their cookies together. Danny and Dinah learn a lesson. They then figure out a way to both appear at each other's openings. Songs: Dinah sings "I Fall in Love Too Easily". Danny and Dinah sing "It's So Nice To Have A Man Around The House".
163	11	"The Reunion"	Sheldon Leonard	Charles Stewart & Jack Elinson	December 15, 1958
Danny gets a call from Charlie "Fingers" Patman (Douglas Fowley). There's going to be a 20 year reunion of three of Danny's old Toledo high school chums. They agreed to meet in New York. Danny wants to take them to some fancy places, but Kathy doesn't think he should show off. Danny tells Kathy that he only finished one year of high school, while the others graduated and went to college. Danny feels very successful considering he didn't finish school. He decides to have the guys meet at Mama Razzini's (Argentina Brunetti) Italian restaurant. Joe Ferbus (Alan Reed), Harry (Milton Frome) and Charlie arrive. Danny learns that Charlie is a world famous surgeon. Harry is a prominent NASA scientist. A Colonel (Gregg Palmer) comes by and tells Joe that the President wants to see him right away. It turns out that Joe is a senior member of the diplomatic corps. Now Danny doesn't feel all that important. Back at home Danny dreams he is a super scientist and he helps Harry with a moon rocket. But then his old school teacher Miss Pelham says he's not smart enough. Danny then dreams he is a super surgeon and he needs to help Charlie. Miss Pelham stops him. The dream then goes to Joe speaking with the French President (Paul Dubov). Joe needs super diplomat Danny's help. Again Miss Pelham stops him. Kathy wakes Danny up and tries to assure him he is successful. The three men come to Danny's house and bring Miss Pelham. She gives him an honorary diploma. Warren Frost as Man In Dream. Bill Erwin as Man In Dream. Song: Danny sings "That Old Gang of Mine".
164	12	"Kathy's Career"	Sheldon Leonard	Jack Elinson & Charles Stewart	December 22, 1958
Danny comes home to find Rusty and Linda dressed in fancy adult clothes. Danny learns from Louise that Kathy got all dressed up and went to lunch with a lady. Kathy comes home all upset that she's back to the housewife routine. She tells Danny she had lunch with her college roommate, Arlene Colby (Cathy Lewis). Arlene is the editor of "Silhouette", a famous fashion magazine. Kathy complains about all the work she has to do around the house. Danny says women have it easy today compared with women in the old days. Kathy says that if she has it so easy, she has time to take the job that Arlene offered her. Kathy tells Danny he can run the house if it's that easy. Later, the two make up until Danny says Kathy couldn't handle the business world. They get into another fight and Kathy says she will take the executive assistant job. Danny gets the kids to act helpless without Kathy, but she sees through the scheme. Later, Kathy brings Arlene home and she meets Danny. The children learn that Arlene isn't married. Kathy overhears Arlene tell Danny that she kind of regrets not having a family. Kathy decides she doesn't want the job and Arlene understands. Songs: Danny sings "Violets for Your Furs". Danny, Rusty and Angela sing "M-O-T-H-E-R (A Word That Means The World To Me)".
165	13	"The Saints Come Marching In"	Sheldon Leonard	Charles Stewart & Jack Elinson	December 29, 1958
The kids come home late for dinner. Linda says that she already had an ice cream soda and a chocolate bar. Kathy wants to know where she got the money. She lets it slip that Rusty gave it to her so she would not tell about him knocking over a trash can. Rusty was with some junior high kids who call themselves the Wild Cats. Mr. Swenson (El Brendel) wouldn't let them in his music store, so they knocked over his trash cans. Rick Fuller, the leader, dared Rusty to knock one over. Danny makes Rusty apologize to Swenson. The Wild Cats show up and start playing the instruments. Danny chases them out of the store. Danny talks to guidance counselor Miss Burns (Lurene Tuttle) and tells her she needs to be more firm with those kids. Miss Burns finds a way to tell Danny that things are not always that simple. She tells Danny that the Wild Cats are actually very good musicians. The boys are frustrated because the school budget was cut and the school can't rent instruments. Miss Burns is touched when Danny writes her a check to help out. Miss Burns has enough faith in Rick that she gives him the check. She tells him the group is to perform at the next nights PTA meeting. If they don't show up, she will quit her job. At the meeting, Miss Burns panics when the group isn't there. But then they show up and all is well. Charles Meredith as School Principal. Songs: Danny sings "Too-Ra-Loo-Ra-Loo-Ral (That's An Irish Lullaby)". Bill Hollingsworth's Dixie-Small Fry perform "When The Saints Go Marching In".
166	14	"Lucille Ball Upsets the Williams' Household"	Sheldon Leonard	Sid Dorfman and Arthur Stander	January 5, 1959
In a crossover with The Lucy–Desi Comedy Hour, Danny and Ricky Ricardo (Desi Arnaz) are rehearsing an act together. Ricky gets a call from his wife Lucy (Lucille Ball) saying she's in jail. It had to do with a gumball machine business she was trying to start to make money. Ricky has to leave to bail her out. Danny suggests that Ricky and Lucy move into his apartment during their nightclub engagement. Danny says that Kathy will be a stabilizing influence on Lucy. After a few days, Ricky says Danny's idea was a good one. But instead of Kathy influencing Lucy, it's the other way around. They are off shopping and buying a lot of clothes. Danny tells Ricky he's got to lay down the law and be tougher on Lucy. The men try to firmer and Danny cancels Kathy's charge account. The next day the women both have new gowns. The men want to know where they got the money. Ricky figures out how they did it and it wound up costing Danny. Danny says that the women have fun trying to scam them. He thinks they should use reverse psychology and let the women have all the charge accounts they want. The women go on a shopping spree. Then Lucy thinks Ricky let her do it because he feels guilty about falling for another woman. Lucy then tries to become the perfect housewife. Ricky gets mad at Danny because he liked the old Lucy better. The wives go back to their spending ways. Song: Danny and Desi sing "I'll See You in C-U-B-A".
167	15	"Tony Bennett Gets Danny's Help"	Sheldon Leonard	David Adler	January 12, 1959
Danny and Kathy are trying to teach Rusty how to dance. Uncle Tonoose makes a surprise visit. He surprises them further by bringing with him Danny's cousin Stephen (Tony Bennett) and Aunt Sophie. Sophie is sad because Stephen doesn't want to work in his father Habib's dry-goods store any more. Stephen wants to get into show business. Tonoose wants Danny to decide if Stephen has any talent as a performer. When they're alone, Tonoose tells Danny that no matter what, he is to tell Stephen he has no talent. Stephen tells Danny that he wants to be a performer because Danny is his idol. Danny does think it would probably be better if Stephen continued working in his dad's business. Danny has Stephen perform at the club and he has an incredible voice. Danny does one more thing to see if Stephen is willing to take the ups and downs of show business. Danny realizes that Stephen definitely has the desire and talent to tough it out. Songs: Tony sings "Without A Song" and "From This Moment On".
168	16	"Tennessee Ernie Stays for Dinner"	Sheldon Leonard	Jack Elinson & Charles Stewart	January 19, 1959
Rusty will not share his toys with Linda because she has nothing to share with him. Danny tells him one is supposed to share with someone that has less than you do. Rusty and Linda come home from the park with a poor drifter named Kentucky Cal (Tennessee Ernie Ford). The kids invited him to dinner. Danny and Kathy can't bring themselves to say Cal can't stay. After dinner, the kids are enjoying Cal's version of the Cinderella story. The kids let it slip that Cal used to be on the radio and had several sponsors. Danny would like to hear more about Cal, but he's reluctant to talk about it and decides to leave. Kathy and the kids would like Cal to come to dinner the next night. Danny thinks Cal is a phony and just made up being on the radio. Cal winds up coming over several nights. One night Danny comes home and Cal is already there, singing to the kids. The kids would rather go to the park with Cal than listen to Danny sing. Kathy is even cooking southern meals for Cal. Danny has his friend Phil check up on Cal's radio story. Danny learns that Cal was a huge star in Louisville. He was a widower with two kids. There was a tragedy and he lost the kids. Cal tells Danny and Kathy that Rusty and Linda helped him stop feeling sorry for himself and he's going home to resume his career. Songs: Tennessee Ernie Ford sings "Sleeping At The Foot Of The Bed" and "The Riddle Song (I Gave My Love A Cherry)".
169	17	"Bob Hope and Danny Become Directors"	Sheldon Leonard	Charles Stewart & Jack Elinson	January 26, 1959
Kathy tells Danny that the kids are trying out for parts in their school's production of "Alice in Wonderland". Danny figures his talented kids will get the lead roles. Rusty and Linda come home and say they got very minor roles. They don't even have any lines. Rusty says they were cast by Mrs. Charlotte Foster (Joan Tompkins), the director. Rusty says that even Leslie Roper, who is Bob Hope's nephew, got a small part. The kids say they're quitting the play. Danny tells them to not quit and they should do the best they can. Danny goes to a rehearsal and meets Charlotte. Danny tells her he just wants to watch and won't interfere. Danny does make some suggestions and he and Charlotte get into a disagreement. Charlotte resigns and tells Danny to take over. Kathy thinks Danny should apologize to Charlotte. He won't do it and will put Rusty and Linda in lead roles. At the next rehearsal Bob shows up and wants to stay and watch. Bob starts making suggestions about Leslie getting a bigger part. Danny gets upset and tells Bob to quit telling the director what to do. Just then Charlotte walks in. Danny realizes that he was wrong for interrupting Charlotte and asks her to take the job back. It turns out Bob was putting on an act and Charlotte is his cousin. Terry Burnham as Girl In Play. Veronica Cartwright as Girl in Play.
170	18	"Red Tape"	Sheldon Leonard	George Beck & Arthur Phillips	February 2, 1959
Kathy's friend Paula Bennett (Angela Greene) has taken in a teenage Norwegian exchange student named Gerta Shoentler (Denise Alexander). Danny comes home and meets them. Kathy is giving Gerta some of Terry's clothes. Kathy hints to Danny that she would like to take a student in. Danny makes a case for not doing it, but then says they should. Danny is hoping to also get a girl, but Kathy says there are a lot of boys students as well. Danny fills out the questionnaire and starts setting up a room for the student. Rusty complains about all the nice stuff that's being put in the room. Mr. Kendall (Parley Baer), the investigator from the exchange program, arrives. Kendall tells them the Williams' household is unsuitable because of Danny's profession. Kendall says that they are looking for a typical American household. Danny gets quite upset and tells off Kendall. Rusty and Linda go to see Mr. Kendall and ask him to reconsider, but he says it's out of his hands. The kids try to cheer Danny up. Mr. Kendall returns and Danny learns Rusty and Linda went to see him. Kathy goes to apologize to Kendall, but winds up telling him off. Kendall actually came to tell them he will accept their application. Danny and Rusty start preparing for a boy student. Kathy tells them that Kendall told her they are getting a 16 year old Italian girl named Gina Minelli. Song: Danny sings "Thank Heaven for Little Girls".
171	19	"Gina from Italy"	Sheldon Leonard	Arthur Stander	February 9, 1959
Danny is quite anxious about the arrival of exchange student Gina Minelli (Annette Funicello) from Italy. Danny's worried he might not be cultured enough for her. Kathy thinks they should just be themselves. Mr. Gianelli (Dayton Lummis) arrives with Gina. Gina is clearly a shy and homesick girl. Danny's over politeness and constant talking about Italy makes things very awkward. Gina would like to help Kathy with dinner, but Danny makes Rusty and Linda do it. It's been almost a week and Danny tells Gina that he doesn't think they have done enough to please her. Gina tells Danny about the things she misses from home. Danny tells Kathy he wants to throw an Italian style party. Kathy says that exchange students are supposed to adapt to their new country. Kathy reluctantly agrees to the party. During the party, Danny does a routine about an Italian and Gina runs out of the room crying. Danny goes to Gina's room and starts yelling at her for not trying to fit in. Gina is happy with him yelling because now she feels at home and part of the family. Songs: Annette Funicello sings "Santa Lucia". Danny sings "Tu Sei Bella Signorina".
172	20	"Shirley Jones Makes Good"	Sheldon Leonard	Jack Elinson & Charles Stewart	February 16, 1959
Danny is waiting around for Benny Lessy to show up so they can go over some material. Benny finally arrives. Danny receives a letter from his old friend and mentor, Otto Nielsen (Lauritz Melchior). Otto says that his daughter Shirley (Shirley Jones) has been in New York at the Studio Club for three weeks. Otto had given her Danny's phone number and hasn't heard from her. Danny tells Benny that they should give her a spot in their show. Danny has Charley Halper (Sid Melton), the owner of the Copa, come by to meet Shirley. Danny is surprised when Shirley arrives. She is tastelessly showy and obnoxious. And she isn't a very good singer. Charley leaves in a hurry. Because if his friendship to Otto, Danny can't tell Shirley what he really thinks. That night, Charley begs Danny to not let Shirley sing. Otto shows up and is so looking forward to hearing Shirley sing. Otto gets upset when Danny tells him Shirley has no talent. Otto doesn't like the flashy clothes and all the makeup that Shirley has on. Otto gets Shirley to adjust her attitude, wardrobe and vocal style. Shirley now sings beautifully and Danny, Benny and Charley are very impressed. Songs: Ben Lessy sings "Tea for Two". Shirley Jones and Ben Lessy perform "I Never Knew How Hard I Could Fall Until He Kissed Me In A High School Play". Shirley Jones sings "It Might as Well Be Spring". Shirley Jones and Lauritz Melchior sing "Deep In My Heart, Dear".
173	21	"Gina's First Date"	Sheldon Leonard	Charles Stewart & Jack Elinson	February 23, 1959
Kathy is trying to learn some Italian. Gina comes home with two of her classmates, Buck Weaver and Bronco Lewis. Rusty knows them because they are on the football team. Gina is helping the boys study for school. Danny thinks the boys are interested in more than studying. Kathy tells Danny to leave them alone. Later, Kathy tells Danny that she thinks Gina likes Buck. Danny asks Gina if Buck has asked her to the dance, but he has not. Buck comes by, but it's only to pick up a book he had left there. Danny hints that Gina has not been asked to the dance yet. Buck says he likes Gina, but is intimidated by her because she's so smart and sophisticated. Danny talks Buck into taking Gina bowling with the gang that night. Despite not knowing how to bowl, Gina is excited about the date. Kathy is still worried about Gina fitting in. Danny tries to give Gina advice on how to dress and act. Gina says she cannot be someone she is not. Gina gets upset when Danny lets it slip that he talked Buck into going out with her. Gina says she will never go out with Buck. Buck comes by and Gina actually takes Danny advice on how to dress and act. Song: Danny sings "The Object Of My Affection".
174	22	"Growing Pains"	Sheldon Leonard	Arthur Phillips and George Beck	March 2, 1959
It's Linda's first day of school. She gets up early to get all prepared. Kathy thinks Linda is growing up too fast. Rusty is not looking forward to going to school because a girl named "Pain In The Neck" Watkins bothers him. That afternoon, Kathy is worried because Linda is a few minutes late. Linda comes home with a new friend named Sylvia. Rusty comes home all agitated because the Watkins girl is now sitting in front of him in class. Linda and Sylvia come in the room and Rusty runs away. It turns out Sylvia is the Watkins girl. After Sylvia leaves, Rusty complains about her some more. Kathy tells Danny that she thinks Rusty actually has a crush on Sylvia. Rusty is practicing his spelling because he wants to beat Sylvia in the spelling bee. Rusty comes home upset and goes to his room. Sylvia arrives and tells Danny she's sorry Rusty lost the spelling bee. Sylvia starts to flatter Rusty about how good he is at sports. Kathy figures out that Sylvia really likes Rusty. Then Danny learns that Rusty intentionally lost the spelling bee so Sylvia could win. The two start hanging out together. After a while Sylvia is with another boy and Rusty is sad.
175	23	"Frankie Laine Sings for Gina"	Sheldon Leonard	Jack Elinson & Charles Stewart	March 9, 1959
Danny and Frankie Laine are in Danny's apartment going over a song for Kathy and Louise. Frankie will be performing with Danny at the Copa. After Frankie leaves, Gina and her friend Betty (Judy Nugent) are excited when they learn he was there. Frankie is Gina's idol and she would love to have him perform at her school dance along with Danny. Danny doesn't want to impose on Frankie. Later, Danny is at Frankie's place and Gina comes by. Gina tells Frankie's about a family member that doesn't live far from one of Frankie's family members in Italy. She asks him to perform at the dance in Italian and because he's taken a liking to her, he agrees. Back at home, Rusty asks Kathy why this dance is so special to Gina. The day of the dance Gina is getting ready for her special evening. Kathy, a registered nurse, notices that Gina is coming down with the measles. Gina is very disappointed. Danny says that he will ask Frankie to come by after the dance and sing to her. Gina feels much better. Kathy asks Danny if he thinks he can really get Frankie to come over. Danny says he has a way to trick Frankie. At the dance, Betty makes an announcement that Gina, who made this all possible, couldn't make because of the measles. Frankie is sorry to hear about Gina. Danny tries his trick on Frankie, but Frankie says he has other plans. When Danny and Kathy get home they learn that Frankie is there and he made a pizza for Gina and will sing to her. Songs: Frankie sings "That's My Desire", "That Ain't Right" and "When You Speak My Name". Frankie and Danny sing "Up Above My Head".
176	24	"Kathy Leaves Danny"	Sheldon Leonard	Jack Elinson & Charles Stewart	March 16, 1959
Danny is recording an album. Danny's agent Phil Brokaw (Sheldon Leonard) and Harry Ruby don't think Danny's picture should be on the album cover. Harry invites Danny to go on a fishing trip where they can discuss the album further. Phil teases Danny by saying that he can't go anywhere without getting Kathy's permission. As bachelors, Phil and Harry can do whatever they want. Meanwhile at home, Kathy tells Louise that she planned a vacation for the family, but hasn't told Danny yet. Danny, Phil and Harry show up and Danny tells Kathy that he invited them over for dinner. Kathy tells Danny she arranged a trip to Mountain View Lodge. Danny tries to impress the guys by telling Kathy she should have consulted him first. The men decide to leave and Danny and Kathy get into an argument. Kathy winds up taking the kids and going to the lodge without Danny. Danny feels bad and Louise gets him to call the lodge. Kathy will not talk to him. Danny sends her several singing telegrams asking her to come home, but they don't work. Something Linda and Rusty say makes Kathy realize she overreacted and should go home. Back at the house, Danny tells Louise he's going up to the lodge. As he opens the door to leave, there is Kathy and the kids. Danny and Kathy make up. Later, Kathy has a way to show Phil and Harry that Danny's the boss. But is he really? Songs: Danny and The Eligibles perform "Who's Sorry Now?". Danny sings "I'm Just A Marionette".
177	25	"Latin Lover"	Sheldon Leonard	Charles Stewart & Jack Elinson	March 23, 1959
Gina and Buck Weaver come back from bowling. Danny thinks that this time he can beat Buck at arm wrestling, but he does not. After Buck leaves, Kathy tells Danny that she does not think Buck treats a lady very well. Danny says that all the boys are like that. Mario Firenze, a young man from Gina's hometown of Palermo, arrives. Mario is very courteous and charming. He came to America because he hopes to be a singer. Mario has to get back to his hotel, but he would like Gina to show him around town later. Gina tells Danny and Kathy that she is surprised that Mario has taken an interest in her. Back in Palermo, Mario and his wealthy family would never talk to the likes of Gina's family. Later, Danny is not happy about Gina spending so much time with Mario. Buck asks Danny what he can do to get Gina to spend time with him again. Danny tells him to be a little more suave. Mario sings for Gina, Danny and Kathy and he is quite good. Danny says he will get Mario an audition with an important friend. Mario is surprised, because he did not know Danny was a famous entertainer. Gina receives a letter from her mother who says that Mario knew about Danny and that is the reason he came and was so polite to Gina. Mario wanted to use Danny and his show business connections to get his singing career off the ground. Gina feels bad that she fell for Mario's act. Danny confronts Mario and Mario sees nothing wrong with what he did. Danny wants to cancel the audition, but surprisingly, Buck talks Danny into letting Mario go to the audition.
178	26	"Losers Weepers"	Sheldon Leonard	Danny Simon and Milt Rosen	March 30, 1959
Mr. Shermahorn (Johnny Silver) tells Phil Brokaw that he's noticed that Danny seems to be worried about something. Phil says that Danny's trying to put an act together and his writers have been slow getting him material. Phil gives Danny the material for his opening at the Copa. But Phil has lost the paper with the parodies Danny is to do. Danny is furious and thinks Phil did it on purpose. Danny then fires Phil. Back at home, the family thinks Danny overreacted. Kathy goes to talk to Phil. Phil found the paper with the song parodies. He gives them to Kathy and she puts them in her purse. Kathy asks Phil to make up with Danny as they need each other. Kathy comes home and Louise can tell something is wrong. Kathy lost her purse. A tearful Kathy tells Danny what happened and he gets upset. Danny tries to reconstruct Kathy's day to see where she may have lost the purse. The Building Doorman comes by with Kathy's purse. Danny wants to give the man a reward, but Danny lost his wallet. Kathy gets Phil to come over. Danny gives Phil his contract back and Phil gives Danny his wallet back.
179	27	"Grandpa's Diet"	Sheldon Leonard	Arthur Stander	April 6, 1959
Kathy is talking to her Aunt Martha (Madge Blake) on the phone. Kathy reluctantly agrees to have her grandfather, John Malloy (Charles Coburn), stay at the house for two days. Danny is looking forward to a weekend off. Kathy mentions to Danny that Aunt Martha is going to a wedding. Aunt Martha usually takes care of John. John is on a very strict diet, but instead tries to eat everything that's not good for him. Danny figures out that John will be staying with them and he finally gives in. Danny learns that he will have to eat the same food that John does. John arrives and Danny finds that he tried to sneak in some hot dogs in his scarf. Danny tells Rusty and Linda that everyone has to watch John to make sure he doesn't eat the wrong things. John is constantly trying to sneak in some other food but gets caught. Danny tells Kathy that John is going to the zoo with Rusty and Linda. The kids come home and say they lost John. Danny and Kathy find John in a delicatessen. Danny tries to use some reverse psychology by telling John he can eat whatever he wants. Because they will let him eat the food, now he doesn't want it. John confesses that he just tried to sneak the food for the fun of it and wouldn't actually eat it. Martha comes to pick up John and she confesses that she enjoys keeping an eye on him. Phil Arnold as Delivery Man. Song: Danny sings "Come On-a My House".
180	28	"Double Dinner"	Sheldon Leonard	Arthur Stander	April 20, 1959
Danny and Kathy come home very late. Kathy is upset with Danny, but he doesn't know why. Apparently, Danny complimented a friends wife for helping her husband's career. And Danny said nothing about Kathy. Kathy thinks that she has failed Danny as a wife. Danny just wants to get some sleep and he tries to make Kathy feel better. The next day, Kathy apologizes. Danny tells her he's been nominated to be Abbott at the Friars' Club. To be elected, Danny needs to get the backing of either Ed Kelly (J. Pat O'Malley) or Sam Jacobs (Jack Albertson). The fact that the two hate each other doesn't help. Charley Halper helps Danny decide to go after Sam. Danny invites Sam to dinner. What Danny doesn't know is that Kathy invited Ed to dinner. That evening, Rusty tells Kathy that there was a phone call from Charley saying that Sam was coming to dinner. Kathy panics and Danny comes home. Danny learns about both men being invited. Sam arrives and Kathy takes him to the kitchen. Ed arrives and Danny and Kathy try to feed the men in different rooms. It's not long before the men realize they are each there. They discover that they don't remember why they were mad at each other. The two reconcile and have dinner together. Danny is surprised when the men say they are going to support the other candidate.
181	29	"Danny's Big Fan"	Sheldon Leonard	Jack Elinson & Charles Stewart	April 27, 1959
Danny is doing his act and is talking about the neighborhood he and Benny Lessy grew up in. After the show Danny tells Benny how tired he is and he just wants to go home. Just then a Salvatore Robustelli (Salvatore Baccaloni) comes by. Salvatore is quite wealthy and will pay Danny to do his show again for him. Salvatore then wants to buy Danny a very expensive meal. Danny turns him down and gets him to leave. The next morning Danny and Benny tell the family about Salvatore. Just then a very extravagant breakfast is delivered to the house, sent by Salvatore. A mink coat is delivered along with other expensive gifts. One night, Salvatore buys out all the seats at the Copa so he is the only customer. Danny is annoyed and refuses to perform for him. Salvatore comes by Danny's apartment to apologize and explains that he just wants to be Danny's friend. Danny tells him that friendship can't be bought. Danny starts to feel sorry for Salvatore, so he and Benny put on a show for him. Because Danny doesn't want money, Salvatore performs for them. Frank Nelson as Waiter at Breakfast. Songs: Danny and Benny Lessy sing "We Belong Together". Salvatore Baccaloni sings "Salud".
182	30	"The Surprise Party"	Sheldon Leonard	Story suggested by : Lucille DeMarest; Teleplay by : Danny Simon	May 4, 1959
It's Danny's birthday and Kathy is planning a surprise party. She tells the children to not say a word about the party. Danny had asked that the family not make a big deal about his birthday. Kathy tells the kids to be very low key about his birthday. Benny comes by. He and Kathy makes plans for how Benny will keep Danny busy later so she can decorate the house. Danny is a little surprised that the kids didn't make a fuss over his birthday. Danny gets upset when Kathy tells him she has errands to run and she leaves. Danny asks Louise what the family is up to. Something she says leads Danny to figure out about the party. He also assumes someone will keep him out of the house. Ed Kelly, a fellow member of the Friar's Club, shows up before Benny. Danny figures Ed is the one to keep him out of the house. Louise is surprised when Benny shows up and Danny is already gone. The house is decorated and Kathy and Benny try to find Danny. Danny and Ed are at the gym. Danny thinks the party will be at Ed's house. Ed calls his wife Doris (Vivi Janiss) and tells her that Danny is coming over for dinner. Danny gets to Ed's house and is looking around for the birthday guests. Ed thinks Danny is going crazy. Danny explains about the party. Danny goes home and sees all the decorations, but the house is empty. Kathy tells him the friends waited for hours and then left. Danny apologizes that he didn't trust her. All his friends come pouring out of the kitchen. Song: Danny sings "You Make Me Feel So Young".
183	31	"Gina for President"	Sheldon Leonard	Charles Stewart & Jack Elinson	May 11, 1959
Danny reads a letter to Kathy from Uncle Tonoose. Kathy doesn't like Tonoose's male chauvinist attitude. Danny and Kathy have a little disagreement over a woman's place in society. Gina gets a phone call and learns she's been nominated to run for class president. Gina's boyfriend Buck comes by. It turns out he is the other person that is running for president. Kathy and Danny get into another argument when Danny says that there's no way Gina can win over Buck. Danny is surprised when Buck tells him he doesn't think he can beat Gina. Danny decides to help Buck with his campaign. Kathy is going to help with Gina's campaign and has a way for Gina to entertain the students. Danny works with Buck on his speech. Gina comes home and says she is withdrawing from the race. Apparently there have been leaflets distributed around school telling the students to "Vote American". Buck feels bad, but the others know he had nothing to do with it. At the auditorium, the Student Moderator announces that as the only candidate, Buck is the new president. Buck tells the students that this not how he wanted to win. He asks the students to raise their hands if they would have voted for Gina. All the students raise their hands and Gina is named the president. Song: Annette Funicello sings "Wild Willie".
184	32	"The Practical Joke"	Sheldon Leonard	Jack Elinson & Charles Stewart	May 18, 1959
Danny is reheasing a song at home. His chubby, temporary maid Muriel Schultz (Muriel Landers) keeps trying to sing along. Just then a basket of kittens is delivered. Danny figures it's another one of Charley Halper's practical jokes. Danny tells Kathy about some of Charley's other jokes. He tells her he will get even with Charley. When mice are delivered, Kathy agrees that Danny needs to do something. Rusty and Linda tell Danny that Muriel is really talented. Muriel does some impressions that are not too good. Muriel claims to be a great entertainer and Danny just puts her off. After something Rusty says, Danny will play a joke on Charley and have Muriel perform at the Copa. When Danny tells Charley about Muriel, Charley says he's never heard of her. Danny really builds her up and tells Charley how beautiful and talented she is. Charley begs Danny to get her. Danny tells Kathy that Muriel will not be hurt because he will show a picture of her to Charley. Muriel tells Danny that she heard about her opening at the Copa from the kids. Muriel is very excited about her big break. Danny will have to tell her the truth, but Kathy is worried she will be hurt. Danny tries to tell Muriel how tough entertaining is, but she says she will not let him down. It's the night of Muriel's performance and Charley faints when he sees her. Everyone is surprised to find out she is a great singer and the audience loves her. Songs: Danny sings "You'll Never Know". Muriel sings "How Come You Treat Me Like You Do?".
185	33	"Linda's Giant"	Sheldon Leonard	Richard Morgan	May 25, 1959
Rusty tells Linda she has to stop pretending she has a giant friend with a magic red coat named Mr. Jumbo. Danny tells the kids he has to work on an arrangement and he would like the kids to go somewhere else. Rusty says he will do his homework and Linda says she will go play in the park with Mr. Jumbo. Danny and Kathy comment on Linda's wild imagination. Miss Richter (Amzie Strickland), Linda's teacher, comes by. She tells Danny and Kathy that she believes Linda is emotionally disturbed. The problem is Linda's belief in Mr. Jumbo. Miss Richter has a degree is psychology, so she would know. She thinks this is happening because Danny is away so much and Linda seeks a strong father image. Miss Richter suggests Danny spend more time with Linda until she admits Mr. Jumbo isn't real. For the next week Danny spends almost all his time with Linda. Kathy says that Linda hasn't even mentioned Mr. Jumbo. Just then, Linda says she's going to the park to see Mr. Jumbo. Danny has a talk with Linda and she insists Mr. Jumbo is real. Danny tells Kathy that Linda needs to be spanked. Danny can't bring himself to do it. The doorbell rings. It turns out to be Mr. Jumbo, the new doorman at the Hotel St. Moritz. Miss Richter comes by to complain more about Linda and sees Mr. Jumbo. Note: A very similar plot was used for a 1962 episode of The Andy Griffith Show, "Mr. McBeevee".

=== Season 7 (1959–60) ===
No. overall	No. in season	Title	Directed by	Written by	Original release date
186	1	"Terry Comes Home"	Sheldon Leonard	Charles Stewart & Jack Elinson	October 5, 1959
Terry (Penney Parker) is coming home after 2 years of school in Europe. Danny is decorating her room. Kathy tells him not to expect a little girl, she will be a young lady. The family is at the airport. The Ticket Agent (O. Z. Whitehead) tells them that the plane is making up time and will be early. Terry arrives and is dressed quite sophisticated. Several of the men passengers and the Airline Pilot (Robert Reed) wish Terry well. At home, Terry will definitely remove the little girl things from her room. Terry then tries to explain to Danny a different psychological way to raise Rusty and Linda. Danny tries to read up on some of the things Terry talked about. Terry wants to go out with some friends and Danny wants her to stay home. They get into a disagreement and Danny sends Terry to her room. When Danny gets home from work Kathy tells him that Terry's moving in with a girlfriend in the morning. Kathy says that Terry resented being treated like a child. Terry pretends to have a stomach ache and gets Danny to hug her. She then tricks him into unpacking her suitcase. Terry doesn't really hate being treated like a little girl and decides to stay. Don Wilbanks as Texan. Song: Danny sings "Daddy's Little Girl".
187	2	"Rusty's Day in Court"	Sheldon Leonard	Norman Paul	October 12, 1959
Rusty is going on a Boy Scout hike that day. The subject about a scout always telling the truth comes up. Linda asks Danny if he told Kathy the truth about the car accident he got into the night before. Danny says there's only a small dent in the car. Kathy comes home from shopping and she thinks she put the dent in the car. Kathy gets upset when she finds out Danny caused the dent and he was going to let her take the blame for it. Danny says that the accident was not his fault. Oliver Watkins (Charles Lane), the other driver, shows up. Danny is willing to forget the whole thing. Watkins wants to go to court to prove it was Danny's fault. The kids were with Danny when it happened. Linda says she was not paying attention. Rusty says he saw the whole thing. Rusty tells Linda it was Danny's fault. In court, George (Francis X. Bushman), the Traffic Court Judge, recognizes Watkins as a prominent attorney. Danny says he can prove that Watkins didn't use a hand signal when stopping. Rusty has glasses on and pretends that he can't see well. George knows Rusty is faking it and asks him to tell the truth. Rusty admits that Watkins did put his hand out and the accident was Danny's fault. Danny apologizes and George tells him he should be proud of Rusty. Back at home, Rusty is afraid because he couldn't stand up for Danny. Danny reassures him that he did the right thing. Allan Lurie as Bailiff.
188	3	"The China Doll"	Sheldon Leonard	Charles Stewart & Jack Elinson	October 19, 1959
Linda introduces her new friend, who she just met, to Danny. The little girl's name is Chow-Lee (Ginny Tiu), but Linda calls her Charlie. Chow-Lee doesn't speak much English. Danny tries to tell her he's busy working at something on the piano. Chow-Lee starts to play the piano and she is very talented. Danny and the family play with Chow-Lee. Mr. Chow (Marvin Miller), Chow-Lee's father, comes by. He says that Chow-Lee is very disobedient and she wandered away from her caretaker. Later, Linda says that Mr. Chow will not let her play with Chow-Lee because he thinks Linda is a bad influence. Danny is angry and goes to see Mr. Chow. Mr. Chow tells Danny that Chow-Lee has a great talent and he doesn't want it corrupted by free thinking American ways. After Danny leaves, Chow-Lee puts on a cowboy hat and leaves the house. She winds up at Danny's place and Rusty and Linda try to hide her. Danny and Kathy find Chow-Lee and Linda says she ran away from home. Mr. Chow comes by and says that Danny has poisoned Chow-Lee against him. When Mr. Chow says that Danny has failed as a father, Rusty and Linda stick up for Danny. Kathy tells Mr. Chow that the children love and respect their father. Mr. Chow finally understands. Songs: Ginny Tiu performs "Twelfth Street Rag" and "I've Been Working on the Railroad".
189	4	"Cupid's Little Helper"	Sheldon Leonard	Jack Elinson & Charles Stewart	October 26, 1959
Terry tells Danny what a perfect marriage her newlywed friends Jerry and Bunny have. Kathy comes home and would like some help with the bags she's carrying. Danny says that he's busy working on an arrangement. Terry thinks that Danny takes Kathy for granted and he could be more romantic. Danny thinks Terry may be right. Danny tries to get romantic with Kathy. She is busy making him lunch and she puts him off. Danny gets upset and leaves. Terry tells Kathy that she hurt Danny's feelings. Terry suggests that Kathy get dressed up and making a romantic dinner for Danny. Danny comes home and Kathy dims the lights and has champagne out. Kathy gets upset when Danny says that Benny is picking him up for a poker game. Terry gives Kathy another suggestion. Danny misunderstands and thinks Kathy is going to have a baby. They get into an argument when Kathy tells him she's not having a baby. They figure out this was all caused by Terry's meddling. Terry apologizes. Danny and Kathy tell her about their real love for each other. Kathy does try another test with Danny, which doesn't quite work out. Song: Danny sings "For You".
190	5	"Terry Meets Him"	Sheldon Leonard	Charles Stewart & Jack Elinson	November 2, 1959
Danny complains about all the bills. He comes across one that is $70 for lunches at the Plaza. Danny asks Kathy about it and she says that Terry has been paying for her European boyfriends. Danny tells Terry that these guys are a bunch of moochers. Terry agrees to not see Lazlo anymore. She is now seeing Leslie Thorndyke (Elliott Reid), who is a British race car driver. Later, Danny tells Kathy that he signed on young comic Pat Hannigan (Pat Harrington Jr.) for the next show at the Copa. Leslie comes by to pick up Terry and she introduces him to the family. Leslie tells Danny that he doesn't race for money, he races for cups. At the club, Danny tells Pat about all the freeloaders that Terry's been dating. Danny asks Pat to pretend to be an Italian golfer and go out with Terry. Danny wants him to be a big moocher and maybe Terry will get over dating these types of guys. Terry meets Pat, who Danny introduces as Guido Panzzini. Terry is quite taken with Guido. Leslie comes by. Things get awkward and Danny gets Leslie to leave. Terry agrees to go out with Guido. While she goes to get ready, Pat tells Danny he feels bad about misleading Terry. It turns out Terry actually recognized Pat and knew it was all an act. She still goes out with him.
191	6	"Jealousy"	Sheldon Leonard	Charles Stewart & Jack Elinson	November 9, 1959
Charley Halper (Sid Melton) comes by the house. Kathy tells him that Danny is still sleeping as he got in late. Charley says that Danny did two shows at the Copa. He then went to the Clover Club to help with Jackie Bell's opening night. Kathy learns that Jackie was a former Copa showgirl who is now a headliner. Kathy gets a bit jealous and annoyed when she hears how sexy Jackie is. Danny comes in the room and Kathy will not let him kiss her. Danny makes light of her jealousy as a typical woman reaction. He says that men wouldn't get jealous like that. Kathy sets out to prove Danny wrong. She places some things around the house that makes it look as though another man was there. Danny knows Kathy made it all up and thinks it's funny. Danny tells Charley what Kathy did. Just then, Charley gets a call from Kathy. She asks him to send a romantic foreign actor to the house to make Danny jealous. Danny wants Charley to tell Kathy he will do it. Danny comes to the house dressed as an Arab and starts to get romantic with Kathy. Kathy figures out it's Danny and starts to play along. Kathy starts making advances toward Danny and he tries to put her off now. Danny gets jealous and asks Kathy if she knew it was him. She leaves him hanging. Kathy tries to prank Danny again, but this time it backfires.
192	7	"Terry Goes Bohemian"	Sheldon Leonard	Arthur Stander	November 16, 1959
Danny and Pat Hannigan are working on a routine and Pat would like to take a break. Terry comes home. Danny learns that Pat has a thing for Terry, but she just thinks he's a useless entertainer. Danny confronts Terry about her statement. She says that he just entertains wealthy people, when it's the poor that need the laughter. Danny suggests taking Terry to the Zen Den, where beatniks hang out, to see what these people are really like. Then she will see that Pat is the better choice. Danny, Kathy, Pat and Terry go to the Den. Roy Dixon recites a hipster poem with Waldo Kinster (Jack Costanzo) on bongos. Danny and Pat think it's a bunch of nonsense. Terry really likes it and gives Roy her address. The beatniks have been coming by Danny's place for three days now. Danny thinks they are a bunch of phonies. Rusty and Linda are picking up some of the beatnik ways. Kathy thinks Terry will get over Roy soon enough. Danny confronts Roy about his philosophy on life. Roy insults Danny and his way of life. Terry then stands up for Danny and tells off Roy. Later, Danny and Pat come home and Rusty and Linda are dressed as beatniks.
193	8	"Rusty, the Weightlifter"	Sheldon Leonard	Charles Stewart & Jack Elinson	November 23, 1959
Danny and Kathy are surprised that Rusty has been coming home right after school to do his homework. He usually goes out to play. Linda says that Rusty is staying away from the playground so Tony Miller doesn't beat him up. Danny thinks Rusty should defend himself, but Kathy doesn't agree. Danny buys some weight lifting equipment for Rusty. If Danny can give Rusty confidence, bullies will back down. Rusty's first attempt at working out doesn't go well. After a week, Rusty tells Danny he's sorry that he's a disappointment. Danny tells him to not give up. Danny tells Kathy that he will put on some light aluminum weights on the barbell. Rusty will think he's getting stronger and gain the confidence he needs. Rusty gets excited when he has no trouble lifting the barbell. Linda comes home and tells Danny and Kathy that Rusty is at the playground waiting to beat up Tony. Danny and Kathy go to the playground. Tony confronts Rusty and the boys, but Rusty is able to get Tony to back down. Back at home, Rusty sees Linda walking out of the house with the barbell and realizes what Danny did. Song: Danny and Rusty sing "High Hopes".
194	9	"Tonoose, the Matchmaker"	Sheldon Leonard	Arthur Stander	November 30, 1959
Terry has been going out with Pat Hannigan. Kathy tells Danny that she wishes Pat would propose to Terry. Despite Danny liking Pat, he thinks Terry should marry a man with a more secure job. But then Danny changes his mind. Both Kathy and Terry don't want Danny to interfere by making hints about marriage. Just because Danny promises to not say anything, doesn't mean he will not get Rusty and Linda to say something. Terry and Pat see through Danny's scheme. Terry is embarrassed and Pat leaves. Terry thinks Pat's gone for good. Just then, Uncle Tonoose shows up and brings with him a man named Salim (George Eiferman). Tonoose says that Salim will be Terry's new husband. Danny tells Tonoose that Terry loves Pat, but Danny may have ruined things between them. Pat comes back and Terry thinks everything will be OK. But Pat actually tells Terry that she should not wait until he makes good and he's giving her up. Danny and Terry try to make Pat jealous by playing up to Salim, but he sees through their scheme. Pat realizes that he doesn't want to loose Terry, so he proposes.
195	10	"Danny and Milton Berle Quit Show Biz"	Sheldon Leonard	Arthur Stander	December 7, 1959
Rusty and Linda show Kathy an article in the paper about Danny's new show at the Copa being a bomb. Milton Berle comes by to offer Danny some encouragement. Milton says he's had shows that have bombed and he just carried on. Milton tells Danny that he's quit show business. When Kathy and Danny don't believe him, Milton asks them when was the last time they read about him in the papers. Milton says that he's now in the oil business. Milton tells them that he's teamed up with oil tycoon Jim Frazier (Douglass Dumbrille). He is on the board of directors of Frazier's company. Milton says he can get Danny a position with the company. Danny is interested, but Kathy thinks he will be miserable out of show business. Kathy says that Charley Halper didn't give him a hard time about the show bombing. Just then Charley comes by and tells Danny how bad the show was. Milton introduces Danny to Frazier. It seems as though Milton is just there to entertain Frazier and the other board members. After the meeting, Danny tries to tell Milton that he is just a court jester for those men. Milton confronts Frazier and realizes that Danny was right. Later, Danny tells Charley that he's coming back to the Copa. Charley says he's hired someone else and it turns out to be Milton. Songs: Danny sings "Back In Your Own Backyard". Danny and Milton sing "There's No Business Like Show Business".
196	11	"Danny and the Little Men"	Sheldon Leonard	Charles Stewart & Jack Elinson	December 14, 1959
Kathy and Terry complain about how much time Danny and Pat are spending working on their show. Terry is all dressed up and says she's finally going on a date with Pat. Kathy tells the kids that Danny promised to go on a vacation as soon as he has his lay off at the club. Danny and Pat come home and say they have some fixes to do for the show. Pat has to break his date. Danny says that after they close at the Copa, they are doing a series of one night stands. Danny wants Kathy to go on the vacation with the kids. Kathy and Terry go to see Charlie Halper to see if there's something he can do to get the guys to rest a little. Charley has a way to make the guys think they are going a little crazy. Charley knows a couple dwarf actors, Billy (Billy Curtis) and Frank (Frank Delfino). He will get them to dress up as little green men. Terry and Kathy tells the guys that they're looking run down. Danny and Pat admit to each other that they are a little tired. Pat sees a little green man pop out of the piano. He then sees another one go into the kitchen. Pat asks Kathy where the men went. The men are sitting at the kitchen table, but Kathy and Terry claim they don't see them. Danny then sees the men. While trying to leave the building, Danny and Pat learn about the dwarfs from the elevator man. They get even with Kathy and Terry by making them think they really have gone crazy. In the end, Danny and Pat are not mad and decide they really need to rest. But, they do find a way to get back at Charley.
197	12	"A Dog's Life"	Sheldon Leonard	Phil Davis	December 21, 1959
Rusty brings home a large St. Bernard dog and Kathy hides it. Danny comes home and the family gets him to sing a song. A Mr. Heckendorn (Gale Gordon) comes to the door because he heard the singing. Danny learns that he bought the building and is the new landlord. Heckendorn wants things quiet in the building and that means no singing. Danny tells the family that the only thing the lease says is no pets. Just then Danny hears a dog howl, but Rusty claims he did it. Danny learns about the dog and that it's going to have puppies. At first Danny wants to take the dog to the pound, but then he changes his mind. The dog makes more noise and Heckendorn comes back. Danny is holding a box of dog biscuits and says he eats them. Heckendorn tries one but can't finish it. Danny tells Kathy the dog has got to go, but she says the puppies are on the way. Kathy goes to call a veterinarian. Linda asks Danny where puppies come from and then she asks where she came from. Danny tries to explain, but Linda says she meant what town did she come from. Heckendorn comes back and Danny confesses that there is a dog and she's having puppies. The family is afraid that their lease is now invalid and they will have to move. Heckendorn says he was raised on a farm and knows how to deliver baby animals. Song: Danny sings "May You Always".
198	13	"Kathy Crashes TV"	Sheldon Leonard	Jack Elinson & Charles Stewart	December 28, 1959
Danny reminds Kathy that next week the Friar's Club is having Family Talent Night. Danny brings out Rusty and Linda and they are all dressed up. They then perform a song and dance together. Danny says that he and Terry will do "Daddy's Little Girl". Kathy is upset that Danny didn't include her in the act. Danny tells her that she has no theatrical talent. Kathy says that to prove it, she will go out and get a job in show business. Kathy leaves the next morning to make the audition rounds. Kathy comes home and tells Danny that every place she went the people were just rude. Danny assumes she will now give up, but Kathy says she will keep trying. Danny comes up with an idea and calls his friend, producer Stanley Cooper (Joe Flynn). Kathy goes to see Stanley expecting to be in a show. She will actually be in a commercial with no lines. Kathy is to portray a dreary house wife who doesn't use a new cleaning product. While Gloria (Betsy Jones-Moreland) is beautifully dressed and uses the product. Everyone praises Gloria. There are endless takes and Kathy is getting worn out. Back at home Danny lets something slip about the audition. Kathy realizes Danny had the whole thing staged. Danny calls Stanley and asks him to get Kathy a real job. Kathy decides she would rather be a house wife. She then finds out that Danny pretended to call Stanley. Is Kathy out of show business for good? Joe Conley as Asst. Director. Song: Rusty and Angela sing "My Mother Never Lets Me Cross The Street".
199	14	"Nightclub Owners"	Sheldon Leonard	Charles Stewart & Jack Elinson	January 4, 1960
Kathy and Terry tease Danny and Pat by saying that entertainers have no business sense. Charley comes by with a contract for Danny to sign. Danny would like more money, but Charley says he just doesn't have it. Charley says he's been paying his Aunt Bertha's medical expenses. Danny feels bad and says he will actually take a cut in pay. Charley confesses that he made up Aunt Bertha. To prove Kathy wrong, Danny tells Charley that he and Pat want to pick up a side business. Charley says that he just bought the building that houses the Gaslight Club and they can go in with him. The people leasing the building are behind on their rent. Charley wants to kick them out, tear down the building and make it a parking lot. Danny and Pat go to the club and see Beatrice Kay performing. Beatrice is an old friend of Danny's. She tells them that she owns the club. The old building owner was giving her time to develop a following, but she's worried about the new owner. When Danny mentions that he and Pat are part owners, Beatrice thinks everything will be fine. Danny and Pat want to perform at the club as a farewell performance and pack the place. The next day Beatrice is all excited about the reviews. Danny and Pat can't bring themselves to tell her about the building being torn down. Charley reluctantly agrees to keep the club open. Songs: Beatrice Kay and The Guardsmen Quartet perform "My Mother Was A Lady" and "For He's A Jolly Good Fellow". Danny sings "It All Depends on You". Beatrice sings "I Don't Care".
200	15	"That Ol' Devil Jack Benny"	Sheldon Leonard	Arthur Stander	January 11, 1960
Danny is waiting for a call from his agent Phil to see if he got a big TV special. Phil calls and Danny learns that Jack Benny got the show. Danny is upset because Jack always beats him out. Jack comes by the house to tell Danny that he hopes there's no hard feelings. Danny doesn't understand why everyone always thinks Jack's funnier than him. Jack asks Danny "What do you think, I'm in league with the devil?" Jack leaves and Danny starts to think that could be true. Jack meets up with the Devil (Gale Gordon) in Hades. The Devil mentions to Jack that he sold his soul to become famous. But part of the bargain was that Jack was supposed to gather more souls for the Devil. Jack has to get Danny's soul or the Devil will break the deal. Jack also has to give Danny the TV show. Jack brings Danny a contract to deal with the Devil. The Devil will bring Danny great success in exchange for his soul. Danny thinks it's a joke, but signs the contract. Danny is surprised when he gets a call from Phil saying he now has the TV special. Something Kathy does makes Danny start to think the deal with the Devil is real. Danny then gets a call telling him he's starring in a movie that Jack was supposed to get. Danny wants Jack to tear up the contract, but Jack says it's too late. Kathy wakes Danny up from a bad dream. Jack comes by saying that the sponsor changed his mind and Danny will get the special. When Danny meets Mr. Saunders (Gale Gordon), the sponsor, he goes running out of the room screaming because he looks like the Devil in his dream.
201	16	"How to Be Head of the House"	Sheldon Leonard	David Adler	January 18, 1960
Danny and Kathy vie to be head of the household when they cannot agree on where to hang their new painting. Terry and Pat come by. Despite wanting to go somewhere else, Pat says he let Terry choose where they will honeymoon. Danny takes Pat into the kitchen. Rusty is there and says he's going to Helen's house to help her clean her room. Danny says that Helen is pushing Rusty around the way Terry is pushing Pat around. Danny says that the man should be in charge. Danny makes Pat tell Terry that he wants to go to Lake Placid for the honeymoon and not Bermuda. Kathy has a talk with Terry and makes her tell Pat they are going to Bermuda. This goes back and forth for a while. Pat almost gives in, but then he says he has to be the head of the household. Danny and Kathy keep the battle going. Terry and Pat say the wedding is off. Danny and Kathy feel as if they over did things. Danny now takes Terry's side and Kathy takes Pat's side. It turns out that Terry and Pat had all along decided to go to Las Vegas for the honeymoon. They did this elaborate act to teach Danny and Kathy about compromise. Songs: Marjorie sings "Don't Give Up The Ship" and "I Cried for You". Danny sings "Tiger Rag" and "The Glory of Love".
202	17	"Danny, the Housewife"	Sheldon Leonard	Jack Elinson & Charles Stewart	January 25, 1960
Kathy gets a letter that excuses her from jury duty. Danny thinks it's her civic duty to serve. Kathy reminds Danny that Louise is on vacation, so she has to stay home for the kids. Danny mentions that he has 10 days off, so he could take care of the household. Danny says how hard could it be. Kathy makes a call and says she's available for the duty. Kathy's jury winds up being sequestered. It's not long before the house is a complete mess and the kids are eating out of a can. Then one night, the house is cleaned and the dinner was perfect. Danny tells the kids it just took a little time for him to get used to things. It winds up that Danny hired Gustaf (Maurice Marsac), who is overseeing a staff that cooks and cleans. Meanwhile, Kathy would like to call home but the Bailiff will not let her. One of the woman jurors (Claire Carleton) says that being sequestered is like being on vacation. Kathy says it's a wonderful feeling when your family needs you. Danny gets a call from Kathy and she will be home soon. Danny tells the kids not to mention Gustaf to Kathy. Kathy comes home and learns about the great meals they have been having. The house is spotless. Kathy starts crying because it appears the family didn't need her. That night Danny has Kathy meet Gustaf. He then tells Kathy how many people he had to hire to replace her. Song: Danny sings "With You".
203	18	"Apple Polishers"	Sheldon Leonard	Charles Stewart & Jack Elinson	February 1, 1960
Danny is rehearsing a song for a TV show. Kathy asks him why he's planning for the show when he has not even signed the contract. Danny thinks the show is in the bag. Rusty tells Danny that Mr. Winston, the owner of a local department store, will buy his baseball team all new uniforms. The catch is that the team would have to let he son pitch once in a while. The boy is a terrible pitcher. Danny tells Rusty to not sell out. Danny's agent, Phil Brokaw (Sheldon Leonard), comes by. Phil tells Danny that they are going to turn the show down. Phil says that sponsor, Howard Sloan (Alan Reed), president of a tire company, is looking for a "yes man". Danny says he has no trouble making compromises. Danny and Phil go to see Howard and his wife Emily. Danny becomes quite the "apple-polisher". Despite Emily having a terrible singing voice, Danny suggests that maybe Phil could be her agent. The next day, Phil tells Danny that Howard is still not ready to sign. Phil tells Danny that he's losing his integrity and he should look for another agent. Rusty comes home and tells Danny the team was more important than new uniform's. He turned Mr. Winston down. Danny tells Howard that he will do the show his way or not at all. Howard likes that Danny finally stood up for himself and signs the contract. Song: Danny sings "From This Moment On"..
204	19	"Tonoose Makes Wedding Plans"	Sheldon Leonard	David Adler	February 8, 1960
Danny comes home and tells the family that he has booked the Cotillion Room for Terry and Pat's wedding. There will be champagne, caviar and an orchestra. Terry is thrilled. Danny even bought a top hat and tails for himself. Pat thanks Danny and hopes nothing will spoil it. Just then, Uncle Tonoose shows up. Tonoose says he hired 30 gypsy fiddlers for the wedding. It will be a Lebanese wedding lasting three days and nights. A cousin is stomping grapes for the wine. There will be 6 truckloads of relatives and 1 truckload of sheep to roast. The wedding will have to be in Central Park. Danny assures the family that he will be able to talk Tonoose out of it. After he sees how happy Tonoose is, Danny cannot bring himself to say anything. Pat tries to talk to Tonoose, but he could not do it either. Kathy and Terry then try with no luck. Danny then realizes they could never get a permit to hold the wedding in Central Park. The next day, Danny and Pat are stunned when the Commissioner gives Tonoose the permit. Tonoose tries on Danny's tails. He thinks he looks so good in it that he wants to wear it at a formal wedding in the Cotillion Room. Song: Danny sings "For Me and My Gal".
205	20	"Danny Meets Andy Griffith"	Sheldon Leonard	Arthur Stander	February 15, 1960
This is the episode that spawned The Andy Griffith Show. Danny and family drive through the town of Mayberry. He gets pulled over by Sheriff Andy Taylor (Andy Griffith) for going through a stop sign. Between insulting Andy, Danny complains that there was no cross street where the sign was. Andy says they only raised enough money for the sign, not the street. Danny says it's nothing but a tourist trap. Danny wants to see the Justice of the Peace. Kathy tells Danny to just pay the fine. The Justice of the Peace turns out to be Andy. Just then Will Hoople (Frank Cady), the Town Drunk, comes in and locks himself up. Danny wants to expose Andy as a crooked Sheriff and calls the local newspaper. Turns out Andy is also the editor of the paper. Danny decides to have the Face To Face TV show come to Mayberry to expose Andy. It's the third day Danny has spent in jail. Danny learns that Andy lost his wife and he has a little boy named Opie (Ron Howard). Danny starts to have a change of heart about paying the fine, but then Andy says something that gets him mad. Henrietta Perkins (Frances Bavier) comes by the Court House and explains why she hasn't been able to pay her taxes. Andy finds a way to help Henrietta. The TV crew arrives and Danny presents his case and does a little exaggerating. Andy presents his case and Danny apologizes to him. But there's still the matter of the fine. Will Wright as Mr. Johnson. Rance Howard as TV Crewman. George Fenneman as Face to Face interviewer.
206	21	"Battle of the In-Laws"	Sheldon Leonard	Arthur Stander	February 22, 1960
Pat's father, Pat Sr. (Jack Haley), is coming to meet Danny's family. Pat Sr. is also in show business. Pat and Pat Sr. arrive. Pat Sr. accuses Danny of stealing a song he did in his act. After some arguing, the two men make up. Pat Sr. offers Danny another song. The two men get into an argument while making a toast to Pat and Terry. They then start insulting each other. It gets to the point where neither man will consent to the marriage. Pat and Terry find a way to make the men feel bad for what they said. Danny and Pat Sr. start making wedding plans. Pat tells Kathy and Terry that the men are getting along perfectly. But then Danny and Pat Sr. have a disagreement over the number of people they are inviting. They call off the wedding again. Pat and Terry have had enough. They say they don't need their father's consent and that they will just elope. The men realize that they will not be at their children's wedding and they feel bad. Pat finds a way to make the men compromise again. Song: Jack Haley sings "I Don't Have To Go To Ireland".
207	22	"Eulogy for Tonoose"	Sheldon Leonard	David Adler	February 29, 1960
Uncle Tonoose comes by. But instead of his usual jovial self, he's very depressed. He claims he is a failure. Tonoose is upset because the Mayor of Toledo will give a eulogy for Sameli, a rival of Tonoose. Sameli is still alive, but the eulogy has been agreed upon. Tonoose wants Danny to give his eulogy when the time comes. Tonoose would like to hear what Danny would say. Danny ad lib's a eulogy, but Tonoose says it's too short. That night, Tonoose wakes Danny up and suggests that Danny sing at the end of the eulogy. The next morning, Tonoose acts sickly and thinks the end is near. Kathy, as a former nurse, checks him out and he's fine. She says it's a nice day and he should go for a walk. Later, a Jack Powell (Ray Walker) brings Tonoose back. Jack tells Danny that he was in his parked car and Tonoose just walked into it and fell down. Kathy tells Danny that Tonoose seems eager for something to happen to him. Tonoose wants to go home and he would like Danny to give the eulogy one more time. Something Danny says makes Tonoose want to live forever. Tonoose even makes amends with Sameli. Song: Danny sings "Oh My Papa".
208	23	"Linda Wants to Be a Boy"	Sheldon Leonard	Charles Stewart & Jack Elinson	March 7, 1960
Danny comes home with a new football uniform for Rusty. Rusty's friends Skippy, Chris, Eric and Rickie (Rickie Sorensen) are there. When he and his friends go up to his room so he can try it on, Linda tries to tag along. Rusty stops her and says that football is for boys. Danny and Kathy try to cheer Linda up. Later, Linda asks Danny why boys are against girls. He says it will not always be that way. The boys come home and Linda puts on a dress and tries to be sweet. The boys want nothing to do with her and Linda is sad. Kathy catches Linda about to cut off her ponytail. Linda says she wants to become a boy. She tells Kathy that she's changing her name to Louie. Kathy wants Danny to find a way for the boys to let Linda play with them. Danny dresses Linda up in a football uniform and brings her to the park where the boys are playing. It doesn't go well and Rusty's friends leave. Danny can't make Rusty understand that he should not ignore Linda. The next day, Danny is surprised when the boys say Linda can play with them. Danny learns that Rusty told the boys they could use his new uniform if they let Linda play. Danny realizes he underestimated Rusty. Linda comes home all sore and wants to be a girl again. Song: Danny sings "Little Girl".
209	24	"Bachelor Party"	Sheldon Leonard	Fred S. Fox & Iz Elinson	March 14, 1960
It's Pat's bachelor party. Everyone is having a great time, but it seems that Pat is not. Pat tells Danny that he may not be ready for the responsibilities of marriage. Danny says he's just going through the pre-marriage jitters. Pat decides to postpone the wedding because he thinks he cannot a good provider for Terry. Danny tells Pat to stay away from Terry. Danny will tell Terry about Pat's decision. The next day, Louise tells Danny that Terry and Kathy went for a dress fitting. Terry and Kathy come home all excited. Danny cannot bring himself to tell Terry what happened. He does tell Kathy. Danny tells Kathy that before their wedding he got cold feet. But when he saw Kathy's face, he knew he could not live without her. Danny hopes the same thing will happen if he gets Terry and Pat together. Pat arrives. When he sees Terry, he says they should get married right away. Harry Ruby as Harry. Johnny Silver as Johnny. Songs: Sid Melton, Harry and Johnny sing "Three Little Words". Danny sings "All Alone", "Don't Take Your Love from Me" and "Makin' Whoopee".
210	25	"Danny, the Handyman"	Sheldon Leonard	Jack Elinson & Charles Stewart	March 21, 1960
Danny is trying to find a song for the middle of his show at the Copa. Rusty tells Danny about the Father and Son project at the Scout Headquarters. Rusty wants to build a dog house. Rusty says that because Danny is an entertainer, he knows nothing about building. Rusty wants to team up with Joey Forbes' father, Joe Sr. (Richard Erdman). Kathy tries to tell Danny to not take it personally. Danny rents a lot of power tools. Charley reminds Danny about the opening at the Copa. To get Danny back to rehearsals faster, Charley offers to help. Things are not going well. Charley tries to talk Danny into hiring someone to build the dog house, but Danny wants to earn Rusty's respect. Joe comes by and teases Danny about trying to build something. Danny hires someone to do the building. Kathy is very disappointed in Danny. Joe and Rusty come to see the dog house. Rusty really stands up for Danny. Danny realizes he already had Rusty's respect. Danny doesn't show them the perfect house, he shows them the mess that he originally built. Songs: Danny sings "I Went Merrily Merrily On My Way" and "It's So Nice To Be Nice To Your Neighbor".
211	26	"The Wedding"	Sheldon Leonard	Arthur Stander	March 28, 1960
Danny tells Sam the Bartender (Herb Vigran) that tomorrow is Pat and Terry's wedding. Charley Halper and some other guys (Milton Frome and Paul Dubov) come by. They don't seem as excited about the wedding and Danny gets upset. Back at home, everyone is busy preparing for the wedding. Kathy is busy with the Caterer (Joey Faye) and doesn't want Danny bothering her. Danny is relegated to just writing checks. Even Pat doesn't need any advice from Danny. Danny tries to help Louise and just makes a mess. When Danny tries to tell Mr. Kelly the dress maker something, Kathy tells Danny to leave. Danny goes back to the club and tells Sam how unneeded he feels. Back at home, Pat tells Danny that he feels like a failure. The three week engagement he was counting on went to some starlet. Danny helps boost Pat's confidence. When Terry is not happy with the way her wedding gown looks, Danny makes her feel better. The pressure of the wedding planning is getting to Kathy and Danny makes her feel better as well. Danny now feels needed. Tiny Brauer as Man Song: Danny sings "Daddy's Little Girl".
212	27	"Three on a Honeymoon"	Sheldon Leonard	Iz Elinson & Fred S. Fox	April 4, 1960
Terry's only been on her honeymoon for one day and Danny's really missing his little girl. Danny tells Kathy that Terry and Pat could have stay in New York for their honeymoon. Danny wants to call Terry, but Kathy will not let him. So he doesn't think about the empty house, Danny suggests that he and Kathy go somewhere for a vacation. Kathy gets a little upset when Danny suggests going where Pat and Terry are honeymooning. Danny asks Louise her opinion, but doesn't like when she disagrees with him. Danny does call and asks for Terry Williams. He panics when he is told she is not registered there. Kathy says Terry's using her married name. When Danny asks for Terry Hannigan, he's told she is not accepting any calls. Charley calls Danny and tells him that Jimmy Durante can't open at the Copa as he has laryngitis. Charley asks Danny to fill in. Danny suggests that Pat take Jimmy's place. Terry and Pat are not happy when Danny shows up. Pat is reluctantly interested in opening at the Copa. Danny and Pat work on some material and then Terry would like to see Danny leave. Danny orders a cot and spends the night. Something Terry says makes Danny feel ashamed and he decides to fill in for Durante. Danny realizes that Terry isn't his little girl anymore. Note: Final appearance of both Terry and Pat.
213	28	"The Deerfield Story"	Sheldon Leonard	Charles Stewart & Jack Elinson	April 11, 1960
Danny is rehearsing his act. He mentions to Charley that, despite being raised in Toledo, he was born in Deerfield, Michigan. Danny wants Charley to hold a ring side table for an old childhood friend of his, Jim Fletcher (Jim Backus). Jim is coming to town and will be staying with Danny for a week. Jim was bigger and stronger and always looked out for Danny. Jim arrives and meets the family. They all go out to dinner on Danny. The next morning, Jim tells Kathy he's concerned about how much money Danny spent on dinner. Kathy says that Danny has a business manager that takes care of the financial matters. Walter Allsbach (Fritz Feld), Danny's tailor, comes by with Danny's new tuxedo. Jim thinks Walter is overcharging Danny and Jim wants to get a better price. Danny tries to tell Jim that he's doing well and he doesn't need Jim's help anymore. Jim makes an excuse for why he's cutting his visit short. Kathy tells Danny that Jim feels useless now. Danny comes up with a plan. Danny has Charley pretend to fire him because his material is getting old. Charley agrees to give Danny another chance if Jim helps him with material about their home town. Jim feels needed again. Song: Danny sings "I Want to Go Back to Michigan".
214	29	"The Singing Delinquent"	Sheldon Leonard	Jack Elinson & Charles Stewart	April 18, 1960
Danny shows Charley a song that Danny, Rusty and Linda were rehearsing. Rusty and Linda want to be in Danny's show. Danny and Charley are auditioning some young people for an act. Charley is surprised that they are from a settlement house. Al Baxter (James Seay) comes by with two teenage girls and two teenage boys. Al introduces David (Robert Banas), Bobby Phillips (Bobby Rydell), Mary Lou (Melinda Casey) and Beverly. Danny will be doing a TV special in Las Vegas and would like some young talent. Bobby is very belligerent and insulting to Danny and leaves. Al says Bobby's done this before and its a shame as he's very talented. Later, Danny can't stop thinking about Bobby. Danny tells Kathy that he thinks Bobby is afraid of failure. Danny says he was like Bobby when he was younger. Danny goes to talk to Bobby and has a nice heart to heart with him. Danny wants Bobby to sing at the Copa that night. Bobby starts to get belligerent again and Danny tells him he's a coward. That night Bobby is a bus boy at the Copa. Danny brings him on stage and Bobby is a hit with the audience. Songs: Danny sings "It's So Nice To Be Nice To Your Neighbor". Danny and Bobby each sing "All of Me". Danny and Rusty sing "I Love You, Love You, Love You Little Angel".
215	30	"Rusty and the Tomboy"	Sheldon Leonard	Charles Stewart & Jack Elinson	April 25, 1960
Rusty and Linda are dancing in the living room. Rusty tells Danny he's practicing for the 8th grade dance this Friday. Kathy tells Danny that they will be chaperones at the dance. Little tomboy Barbara comes by in her baseball uniform. Barbara fills in on Rusty's baseball team when someone doesn't show up. Barbara tells Kathy that she really likes Rusty. She wishes she could go to the dance with Rusty, but he has not asked her. Rusty tells Danny he's going to the dance, but he's not taking anyone. Danny gives Rusty advice on how to treat a girl thinking Rusty will then ask Barbara. The next day, Danny learns that Rusty asked Gloria Butler (Sherry Alberoni) to the dance and she said yes. Gloria is the most popular girl in class. Kathy and Barbara find out that Rusty is taking Gloria. Barbara says she just wants Rusty to think she's a good ball player. But she is clearly sad that Rusty didn't ask her. Danny has a talk with Rusty and tries to get him to ask Barbara to the dance. Despite the fact that Gloria could easily get another boy, Rusty thinks it would be bad manners to break his date with her. The day of the dance, Rusty brings Gloria to the house. Danny is disappointed, but then he learns that Rusty did break the date with Gloria. Rusty is going to ask Barbara. Rusty is very impressed when he sees Barbara all dressed up. Song: Danny sings "Let A Smile Be Your Umbrella".
216	31	"Family Portrait"	Sheldon Leonard	Jack Elinson & Charles Stewart	May 9, 1960
Danny and Kathy are expecting world famous artist Godfrey Gaylord (Gale Gordon). Danny tells Louise that the only reason Godfrey agreed to come by is because Danny did a benefit for his manager's favorite charity. Rusty complains about having to get dressed up for Godfrey. Danny is hoping that Godfrey will agree to paint a family portrait. Godfrey is upset that it took so long for Danny to answer the door. Danny and Kathy are surprised when several of Godfrey's suitcases are delivered. Godfrey will not paint someone without knowing them. To get to know someone, he needs to live with them. Godfrey will take the main bedroom and expects the family to carry his luggage. Godfrey turns out to be a very demanding and condescending person. It's been a week and Godfrey still hasn't decided if he will paint the portrait. The stress is getting to them and Danny and Kathy start bickering with each other. Louise says it isn't worth it. Something Linda says makes Danny realize that enough is enough. The family tells Godfrey off. Godfrey is inspired by their spirit and decides to paint their portrait.
217	32	"Rusty Meets Little Lord Fauntleroy"	Sheldon Leonard	Story by : Hal Fimberg; Teleplay by : Norman Paul	May 16, 1960
Danny is being interviewed by Mrs. Crane (Cathy Lewis), a show business reporter. Linda comes running into the house being chased by Rusty. Rusty was trying to hit her because Linda bit him. Mrs. Crane says she has a young son named Charles (Lee Aaker). He's been at a military academy for a couple years. Mrs. Crane's husband is an engineer who travels a lot and she is quite busy. They thought the school would be a stabilizing environment for Charles. Mrs. Crane mentions how Charles is a perfect little gentlemen. Just then Mrs. Crane gets a phone call that she is to go away on an overnight assignment. Charles was coming home today because tomorrow is his birthday. Thinking that Charles would be a good influence on Rusty, Kathy suggests that Charles spend the night with them. Charles arrives and is very polite and respectful. Rusty is not impressed. When Charles is alone with Rusty, he turns out to not be the perfect child he pretends to be. When practical jokes start happening around the house, Danny tells Rusty he knows Charles is doing it. Danny confronts Charles and he says he hates all adults and that his parents don't care about him. Danny finds a way to make Charles feel better. Danny makes Mrs. Crane realize that her son feels neglected and unloved.
218	33	"Rusty's Advice to Linda"	Sheldon Leonard	Flashback Material : Arthur Stander; New Material : S.L. Bershad and R.J. Jacobs	May 23, 1960
Linda asks Kathy to buy her new skates. Kathy gets upset because Linda lost her skates because of carelessness. When Danny tells her they will not buy new skates, she says that they don't love her. Linda asks Rusty to break open her piggy bank. Rusty tells her that Danny and Kathy will not let her use that money for skates. She says she wants the money to run away from home. Rusty talks her out of it by telling her about the time he ran away to an orphanage. Danny got a call to perform at the Sands, but it meant he had to back out on a promise to play at Rusty's school. Linda apologizes to Danny and Kathy. Danny and Kathy go out to buy the skates. Mary Wickes as Liz O'Neill (archive footage). Lurene Tuttle as Mrs. Martin (archive footage). Tiger Fafara as Eddie - Boy at Orphanage (archive footage). Song: Danny sings "It All Depends on You". Note: This episode includes flashbacks to "The Orphan Asylum" (Season 4, episode 25). 'S.L. Bershad' and 'R.J. Jacobs' are pseudonyms for producers Sheldon Leonard and Ronald Jacobs.

=== Season 8 (1960–61) ===
No. overall	No. in season	Title	Directed by	Written by	Original release date
219	1	"Linda Delivers the Mail"	Sheldon Leonard	Ray Singer & Dick Chevillat	October 3, 1960
The family is in a new apartment. Kathy is quite upset that she has to keep picking up after the family. When Danny tries to make Kathy feel better, he winds up saying all the wrong things. Neighbor Mrs. Bennett (Shirley Mitchell) comes by. She wonders if Danny has been getting any of her mail by mistake. Kathy mentions that they haven't gotten any mail for the last few days. Danny thinks that someone has been stealing the mail. Kathy finds Linda with quite a bit of mail in her room. Linda says she's been helping Postman Thompson (Joe Besser) deliver the mail. Thompson's feet have been hurting him. Linda took some of his mail without him knowing it. Until she can get the mail where it's supposed to go, Kathy hides much of it under the coach cushion. Charley Halper comes by and he sees Kathy putting mail in the boxes. Danny thinks she's a kleptomaniac. Danny's worried because he made a call and an inspector is coming out. Danny and Charley find the mail in the couch. Kathy is about to tell Danny about the mail when the doorbell rings. Mr. Denton (Parley Baer), the Postal Inspector, arrives. Danny tries to tell him everything is fine, but Denton sees mail hidden in the piano. Kathy and Linda explain everything to Denton. Kathy tells Danny that the reason she has been so irritable lately is because she found a grey hair.
220	2	"The Report Card"	Sheldon Leonard	Jack Elinson & Charles Stewart	October 10, 1960
Kathy wants Danny to put up some hooks in a closet. Danny just wants to relax. Rusty and Linda come home. Rusty is afraid to show Danny his report card. Rusty is surprised when he finds all A's. Danny and Kathy are very proud of Rusty. Danny gives Rusty a dollar for each A he got. The next day at school, Rusty returns the signed report card to his teacher, Mrs. Willoughby (Eleanor Audley). She tells Rusty that she made a mistake and those grades belong to Richard Williams (Rich Correll). Rusty doesn't know how he will tell his father. Danny is calling everyone about Rusty's grades. Danny keeps telling Rusty how happy he is. Rusty tries to talk Linda into signing Danny's name to the updated report card. Mrs. Willoughby reminds Rusty that it's been days and he hasn't returned the report card. She goes to talk to Danny. Danny tells Rusty that he's not mad and apologizes for putting that pressure on him. Linda comes home with her report card and it's all A's. Linda says that a boy she likes will not talk to her because he doesn't like people who are smarter than him. Linda asks Rusty to teach her how to be stupid. Note: This plot was repeated on an episode of The Andy Griffith Show.
221	3	"Danny and the Actor's School"	Sheldon Leonard	Charles Stewart & Jack Elinson	October 17, 1960
Danny's show at the Copa got rave reviews in the paper. Danny tells Kathy that after the show, TV producer Norman Cornell spoke with him. Norman offered Danny a lead role in a Theater Arts production. It would be a dramatic role. Kathy and Louise are very excited. Danny then tells them he turned the part down as he's not an actor. Charley comes by and tells Danny he should do the part. Kathy suggests Danny go to an acting school. Danny goes to Maxim Gorski's (Leo Fuchs) Acting Academy. Maxim gives Danny a scene to improvise. Students Sheldon and Rosie critique what Danny did and it was not flattering. It's been two weeks and Maxim doesn't think Danny is getting any better. Charley tells Danny that his monologues haven't been up to par. Danny is a little depressed that his acting isn't improving. Kathy and Charley go to the acting school and see Danny berated by the students. Kathy tells them off. Later, Danny thanks Kathy for what she did for him. Songs: Danny sings "There's No Business Like Show Business" and "It Amazes Me".
222	4	"Kathy and the Glamour Girl"	Sheldon Leonard	Charles Stewart & Jack Elinson	October 31, 1960
Danny comes home with Charley. Danny tells Louise that they are having company for dinner. Danny will be working with glamour girl Lisa Lazlow (Zsa Zsa Gabor) from Hollywood. Charley says that Kathy is going to be very jealous. Kathy comes home with the kids. When Kathy hears about Lisa coming, she gets upset because she doesn't have time to get dressed. Kathy finds out that Danny and Lisa have worked together before. Danny sang a song to Lisa in the show that he used to sing to Kathy. Lisa would really like Danny to sing the song to her again in their next show. The next day, Danny and Lisa are rehearsing. Lisa would like Danny to have lunch with her in her dressing room. Kathy comes by to apologize to Danny for the way she acted the night before. She invites him to lunch. She gets mad when she learns Danny will be having a champagne lunch with Lisa. Back at home, Danny and Kathy get into an argument. Kathy wants Danny to stop working with Lisa. Later, Lisa comes by and tells Kathy that Danny fired her. Lisa and Kathy come to an understanding and become friends. Kathy tells Danny that Lisa has to stay in the show. Song: Danny sings "But Beautiful".
223	5	"Danny Proposes to His Wife"	Sheldon Leonard	Iz Elinson & Fred S. Fox	November 7, 1960
Kathy is taking a test in a magazine called "Rate Your Mate" to see how Danny rates as a husband. Danny didn't rate very well. Kathy thinks that Danny is taking her for granted. Kathy also gets upset that Danny keeps bringing up that she was the one who proposed. Kathy demands that Danny propose to her. Until he does, she doesn't consider their marriage official. There also has to be a courtship period. Danny will have to stay somewhere else. Danny goes to spend the night at Charley's place. He explains to Charley what Kathy said. Danny calls Kathy and asks her for a date. The next night, Danny comes by to pick up Kathy. The kids are playing along with the courtship game. Danny tries to propose, but Kathy wants to go out to dinner. After the date, Danny tries to get romantic with Kathy, but she keeps putting him off. Kathy agrees to let Danny kiss her, but then Rusty interrupts them. They profess their love for each other and Kathy proposes to Danny. Danny tells Kathy to not say another word and he proposes to her. Song: Danny sings "Don't Take Your Love From Me".
224	6	"Kathy, the Matchmaker"	Sheldon Leonard	Story by : Tom & Helen August; Teleplay by : Arthur Stander	November 14, 1960
Danny's manager, Phil Brokaw (Sheldon Leonard), wants him to go to Philadelphia to sign a contract. Danny says he can't go because of Kathy. Phil makes fun of Danny for being married. Danny thinks Phil is afraid to get married. Phil makes a bet with Danny that he can get Kathy to beg Danny to go. Meanwhile, Kathy has a friend, Doris Henshaw (Betsy Jones-Moreland), who is very handy and capable. She can work on plumbing, painting, electrical things and cars. Kathy says that Doris can survive without a husband, but Doris still wants one. Kathy invites Doris to dinner on Sunday. Kathy will try and set her up with someone. Danny and Phil come to the house and Kathy will not let Danny go to Philadelphia. Somehow it comes up that Phil would not be a confirmed bachelor if he could find a self-reliant and dependable woman. Kathy doesn't know that he made that up. Kathy says that Danny can go to Philadelphia if Phil comes to dinner on Sunday. Later, Kathy tells Danny she wants to set Phil up with Doris. Danny goes to Phil's place to warn him. The night of the dinner, Phil comes by early. He finds a way to have Kathy kick him out. As he's leaving, Doris shows up and he is instantly attracted to her. Kathy still kicks him out.
225	7	"Tonoose, the Liar"	Sheldon Leonard	David Adler	November 21, 1960
Rusty and Linda get into an argument with their friend Richard when Richard calls Uncle Tonoose a liar. Just then Tonoose shows up. Danny admits to Kathy that Tonoose does tell some fanciful tales. Kathy is worried about how it will affect the children. Tonoose tells Danny and Kathy how much it means to him to have the children enjoy listening to him. Danny cannot bring himself to tell Tonoose to stop with the exaggerated stories. Phil calls Danny about doing the Sports Writers Dinner. Danny will be doing a sketch with middleweight champion Kid Moore (Art Aragon). Tonoose tells the children that he knows Kid Moore. Danny tells Kathy that Kid is coming by the apartment the next day to rehearse with him. Kathy is worried that the children will learn that Tonoose is a liar. Danny tells Tonoose about Kid coming by. Danny is sure Tonoose will find a way to tell the children that he doesn't know Kid. The next day Kid arrives. Tonoose makes an excuse to not see Kid and goes to another room. The children mention Tonoose to Kid and he says he doesn't know Tonoose. The children are very disappointed and Danny tells them that Tonoose makes up the stories for fun. Danny tells Kid that they will rehearse at the Copa and Kid leaves. Kid comes back and recognizes Tonoose. Kid knew him as Goat Cheese Tony and they were great friends. Later, Tonoose tells Danny and Kathy that he knows a big TV star and they don't believe him. Just then Bob Hope comes by looking for Tonoose.
226	8	"Linda, the Performer"	Sheldon Leonard	Jack Elinson & Charles Stewart	November 28, 1960
The family is at the club celebrating Linda's birthday. The audience would like Linda to sing and she does. The next day Charley comes by and says what a hit Linda was. He would like Linda to be in Danny's upcoming TV special. Danny likes the idea of a kids spot on the show. Linda has been working with Danny for a week now. Rusty is upset because she was supposed to be his football team's cheerleader. Plus, Danny's been buying her new clothes all week. Kathy thinks Danny might be overdoing it. Danny is auditioning some other children to be included in the kids spot. Despite some very talented kids, Danny is not impressed. Kathy says that he's not using any of the other children because they might upstage Linda. Something Julie Ann's Mom (Amzie Strickland) says to Danny, makes him decide to use the other kids. He realizes that he wants Linda to be a normal kid and he will not use her in the show. Later, Linda tells Danny that besides being a cheerleader, she's also the water boy. Danny gets soaked when he asks what a water boy does. Songs: Danny sings "This Is A Very Special Day". Angela sings "The Ballen-Kay". Judy Birr sings "Saint Louis Blues". "When You're Smiling" Played during tap dance number by Nino Nobles.
227	9	"Danny and the Dentist"	Sheldon Leonard	Ray Singer & Dick Chevillat	December 5, 1960
Danny has a bad toothache. Rusty suggests going to a dentist, but Danny refuses. Danny tells Rusty to not say anything to Kathy as she will make Danny go to a dentist. It doesn't take long for Kathy to figure out what's going on. She says she's making an appointment. Charley comes by and Kathy asks him to go with Danny to the dentist so he doesn't chicken out. At Dr. Stanley Patman's (Richard Deacon) office, Danny keeps trying to leave but Charley stops him. Danny comes up with the idea to pass off Charley as himself. If Charley doesn't do it, Danny will not sign his new contract. Patman does learn which of the two is actually Danny. Charley winds up getting some teeth pulled. Later, Charley tells Danny he had to take his little nephew for his first hair cut. Charley winds up bald. Song: Danny, Rusty and Angela sing "I Whistle A Happy Tune".
228	10	"Fugitive Father"	Sheldon Leonard	Charles Stewart & Jack Elinson	December 12, 1960
Danny informs the audience at the club that he will be going on a two week vacation. He then introduces old friend Buddy Bruno (Buddy Hackett), who will be filling in. After the show, Buddy introduces Danny to his young daughter, Barbara. As a widower, Buddy has to take Barbara with him everywhere. Buddy asks Danny and Kathy if Barbara can stay with them for the two weeks. Buddy says the Welfare Board is after him because they don't like the way Barbara is being brought up. The next day, Harriet Waller (Amzie Strickland), from the Welfare Board, comes by. She wants to talk to Danny about Buddy. Barbara is trying to hide. Buddy then shows up. Buddy tries to tell Harriet that Barbara is in Los Angeles with some rich relatives. Harriet doesn't believe him, but for now she doesn't have a warrant to search the place. Danny and Kathy tell Buddy that he should turn himself in to the Welfare Board. Danny, Kathy, Buddy and Barbara go to see E. H. Sloan (Dayton Lummis) at the Welfare Board. Harriet says that Barbara should be made a ward of the court until a foster home can be found. Buddy pleads that he can't live without Barbara. Buddy says that he will quit show business, get a real job and settle down. After something that both Danny and Harriet say, Sloan will let Buddy stay in show business and keep Barbara. Gloria Pall as Hatcheck Girl. Song: Danny sings "I Want to Be Happy".
229	11	"The Singing Sisters"	Sheldon Leonard	Jack Elinson & Charles Stewart	December 19, 1960
Danny and the kids are putting up the Christmas tree. Kathy wants Danny to audition a sister act for his Christmas special. Danny says he's just too busy, but reluctantly agrees. At the club, Danny tries to talk Charley into seeing the sisters. They are surprised when two nuns arrive, Sister Beatrice (Jan Clayton) and Sister Margaret (Rose Hobart). The Sisters have written a song. They had hoped Danny would sing it on his show and they could make enough money to repair the orphanage bus. Danny tells them that songs don't make money until they are published. The Sisters say they have a publisher who gave them a contract and they were only charged $75 in publishing costs. Danny and Charlie are very suspicious and say they will look into it. They get disguised and go to the Quick Sell Music Company. There they meet Joe (Joe Flynn) and Al (Chick Chandler). They manage to frighten Joe and Al and get the Sisters money and song back. Joe and Al even say they're going into a different business. Danny tells the Sisters that he went several publishers. While they liked the song, it was too late in the season to put it out. The Sisters will have to wait until next year. Danny finds a way to get the Sisters a new bus. Songs: Jan sings "The Miracle of Christmas". Danny sings "The Lord's Prayer" and "A Piece Of Pizza, Cha-Cha-Cha".
230	12	"Rusty the Rat"	Sheldon Leonard	David Adler	December 26, 1960
Charley complains to Danny and Kathy about his nephew Herbert, who always gets in trouble. Danny says the parents did a bad job raising the boy. Danny says his kids know right from wrong. Rusty breaks one of Danny's golf clubs. He's worried that he will be grounded and his team will lose their next game. Rusty tries to get Linda to take the blame for him now. He will take the blame for her sometime in the future. Linda tells Danny she broke the club and he sends her to her room. Charley tells Danny that Linda is taking the blame for Rusty. Kathy agrees with Charley and says Linda is not strong enough to break the club. Danny doesn't believe it. Something Rusty does makes Danny realize Kathy and Charley are right. When Danny talks to Rusty about honesty, Kathy and Charley each have something to confess to Danny. Danny now thinks that Rusty is letting Linda take the blame because he figures Danny will not really punish Linda. Danny tells Rusty some of the ways he could punish Linda, but Rusty still doesn't confess. Danny and Kathy start to believe Linda really did break the club and want to apologize to Rusty. Rusty finally confesses. Danny will ground him, but after the game.
231	13	"The Plant"	Sheldon Leonard	Jack Elinson & Charles Stewart	January 2, 1961
Louise is upset about the mess Danny and the kids are making while playing. A Floral Deliveryman (Johnny Silver) drops off a plant. Danny thinks it's a plant that Kathy bought. It turns out to be from Archibald Maxwell, a man Danny did a benefit for. The card says Danny should call him about instructions for care and feeding of the plant. Danny's landlord, Mr. Heckendon (Gale Gordon), comes by to say neighbors have complained about noise from Danny's apartment. Heckendon is thrilled when he sees the plant. He says the plant is an Orchidus Maximus and tells Danny how rare it is. Heckendon brings a photographer to take a picture of the plant with Danny and Kathy. Heckendon tells Danny the very strict things he must do to have the plant survive. They have to keep it very warm in the apartment and have vaporizers. Danny can't smoke around the plant. Charley comes by and can't believe how hot it is. The kids complain about the conditions. Heckendon comes by again and discovers the plant has a virus. Rusty has a cold and Heckendon wants him out of the house. When they almost make Rusty leave, Danny and Kathy realize things are out of control. They give the plant to Heckendon.
232	14	"Democracy at Work"	Sheldon Leonard	Benedict Freedman & John Fenton Murray	January 9, 1961
Kathy wonders why it's so hard teaching the kids some manners. Charley comes by and tells Danny that he had a talk with Marty Lander, Danny's writer. Marty was not happy when Charley said that Danny didn't like the routine and wanted it rewritten. Danny says you have to know how to handle people. Danny calls Marty and works things out. Rusty and Linda want to go to the movies, but Kathy says no. Rusty says that he learns about democracy in school, but there is no democracy at home. Danny tells the kids that they will vote on things from now on, but no one can be a sore loser if it doesn't go their way. Things backfire on Danny when the family votes for him to do the dishes. When Danny gets home from work, Kathy says that the kids out voted her on everything. They could stay up late, eat whatever they wanted and Danny should double their allowance. Danny says he cannot go back on his word, because then he and Kathy will look like sore losers. The next morning the kids are too tired to go to school because they stayed up so late. The kids vote to not go to school. Danny finds a way to get them to go. Rusty didn't do well at baseball because he was tired. Linda flunked a test. Kathy finds a way to have Danny voted head of the family and he makes the decisions.
233	15	"You Can Fight City Hall"	Sheldon Leonard	Fred S. Fox & Iz Elinson	January 16, 1961
Danny comes home upset because he got a ticket for over time parking. He says he doesn't deserve it as the parking meter was off. Rusty thinks he should fight it. Rusty says that throughout history people fought for what they believed in. Later, Rusty tells Danny that he used a stop watch to time the meter and it was 5 minutes off. At first Danny says it's not worth the trouble, but then he decides to go to court. Danny and Rusty go to see Judge Palmer (Jerome Cowan). Danny winds up paying $50 in contempt off court charges. Danny then gets a jury trial date. At the trial, Prosecutor Adams thinks Danny is doing this just to get publicity. Danny calls Charley as a witness to say the club is doing well and Danny doesn't need the publicity. Danny then calls Rusty. Adams asks Rusty if the stop watch could be wrong. Danny then calls John Bradley (Stacy Harris), who says the meter is off. Adams questions him and learns that John is a nuclear timer expert. Adams still asks the juror to find Danny guilty. Danny makes a very moving summation and Judge Palmer urges the jury to vote not guilty. Palmer will also refund Danny's contempt charges. Jack Prince as Bailiff.
234	16	"The Whoopee Show"	Sheldon Leonard	David Adler	January 23, 1961
Danny comes home from an out of town engagement. Danny tells the Cab Driver (Herb Vigran) how much he looks forward to seeing his beautiful wife, Kathy. Kathy comes in the room wearing an old rob and has curlers in her hair. The Cab Driver jokes that Danny must be in the wrong house. Kathy says she thinks she's coming down with the sniffles. Danny complains about the way she looks and they have a small argument. He decides to sleep on the coach. The next night, Danny uses parts of the argument as material for his act at the club. Kathy is all dressed up, has soft music playing and has the lights dimmed. Danny comes home and Kathy apologizes for the night before. He tries to make Kathy forget about the night before. Danny tells Kathy about the material he used and what a big hit it was. Kathy is furious and they have another fight. The next morning, Kathy is not speaking to Danny. Danny learns he could have made everything better if he had done one thing. Song: Danny sings "Makin' Whoopee".
235	17	"The Rum Cake"	Sheldon Leonard	Charles Stewart & Jack Elinson	January 30, 1961
Danny is helping Rusty practice his drums for the school orchestra auditions. Kathy says it's almost 11 o'clock and Rusty needs to go to bed. Just then there's a knock on the door. It's Mr. Heckendon, Danny's landlord. Surprisingly, he doesn't make them stop and he stays to listen. But when the time goes passed 11, Heckendorn says they have broken their lease and will be evicted. The next day, Kathy thinks that calmly talking to Heckendorn will get him to change his mind, but Danny thinks it's a waste of time. She invites him over for coffee and cake that afternoon. Kathy wants to make a rum cake and Danny tells her to not be stingy with the rum. While Kathy is not looking, Danny adds more rum. When Danny leaves the kitchen, Kathy adds more rum. Louise adds some more rum. Heckendorn arrives and has quite a bit of cake. It's not long before he's singing and dancing. He tells Danny and Kathy how much he likes them. Heckendorn tells the kids to play football in the lobby. A drunk Heckendorn will let the family stay. When Rusty rehearses past 11 again, Heckendorn comes by and tells Kathy to bake another cake. Songs: "(Won't You Come Home) Bill Bailey" Performed by Amanda Randolph (vocal), Danny Thomas (piano), and Rusty Hamer (drums). "Mademoiselle From Armentières (Hinky Dinky Parlez-vous)" Performed by Gale Gordon.
236	18	"Tonoose, the Boss"	Sheldon Leonard	Jack Elinson & Charles Stewart	February 6, 1961
Uncle Tonoose arrives for a visit. Tonoose tells Danny and Kathy that he brought with him his life savings, $700. He wants to invest it so he will be able to send his grand-nephew Habib to college and on to medical school. Tonoose says he met a man on the bus that has a uranium mine in his cellar that he wants to invest in. Danny talks to Charley about investments. Charley says that his club does really well because he makes all the decisions. Danny thinks Tonoose should invest in the Copa, but Charley is against it. Tonoose agrees to invest in the club, but he wants to help run it. At the club, Chef Marcel (Fritz Feld) gets upset when Tonoose wants the menu to be Lebanese food. Danny is rehearsing a number with some dancing girls. Tonoose says the girls are too skinny and he hired some large women. Tonoose brings a goat to the club so Marcel can cook with goat's milk. Charley tells Danny that Tonoose is driving the customers away. Danny knows that Tonoose has got to go. Kathy suggests giving Tonoose some extra money. Danny tells Tonoose that he doubled his money and he can go back to Cleveland. Tonoose wants to stay and make even more money. Tonoose tells them he will leave when Habib gets into medical school. Then he tells them Habib is still in kindergarten. Maxine Gates as Fat Blonde Showgirl. Song: Danny sings "Palomino Pal".
237	19	"Rusty, the Millionaire"	Sheldon Leonard	David Adler	February 13, 1961
Rusty welcomes Danny home, only to ask him for some money to go have sodas with his friends. Danny asks Rusty what he did with the dollar he gave him yesterday. Danny says Rusty needs to have more respect for money. Danny now will not give Rusty any money. Kathy wonders what would happen if Rusty had a good sum of his own money. Danny suggests giving Rusty $25. Kathy says it has to be Rusty's money, not money Danny gives him. Danny will pretend that an old coin Rusty had is worth $50. Rusty says he will put the money in the bank. Later, Linda says that Rusty is in his room counting his money. Rusty's friends Red (Pat Close) and Benji come by. Rusty thinks they just want him to by sodas for them and sends them away. Now Danny and Kathy think Rusty's turned into a miser and want him to spend a little money. When Rusty goes to sleep, he locks his money in a box and chains the box to his ankle. He sets up a burglar alarm in his room. The next day, Rusty says the money was making him unhappy, so he gave the money to the Community Chest. Song: Danny sings "The Best Things In Life Aren't Free".
238	20	"Good Old Burlesque"	Sheldon Leonard	Charles Stewart & Jack Elinson	February 20, 1961
Kathy hired a Swami to entertain some of her friends. Danny and Charley come home and the Swami tries to avoid eye contact. He leaves very quickly. Danny recognizes him as Doodles Faye (Joey Faye), an old burlesque comic. Kathy has a bad impression of burlesque. Danny says many of today's great comics started there. Danny and Charley do a routine for Kathy. Danny and Charley want to do some of the routines in the act and have Doodles join them. They go to see Doodles. At first Doodles seems excited about their invitation, but then he says there's no going back. Danny tries a little more, but Doodles still turns him down. At the club, Danny really thought Doodles would show up. Danny starts to perform and there's Doodles in the audience. They do a routine together and the audience loves it. Songs: Danny sings "Smile". Danny and Sid sing "Be a Clown".
239	21	"The Four Angels"	Sheldon Leonard	Charles Stewart & Jack Elinson	February 27, 1961
Danny tells Louise that he is trying to think of something to do on The Ed Sullivan Show. Danny's agent Phil Brokaw comes by and says he will be playing golf with Ed Sullivan. While golfing they will be talking about Danny's spot on the show. Rusty wants to know how Phil became an agent if he didn't finish high school. Rusty says he might want to be an agent. Later, Rusty brings a young vocal group called The Four Angels to the house. Rusty tells Kathy that he is their agent. Rusty would like to get them on the Sullivan show. Kathy says that Danny will probably not be in the mood for an audition. Rusty tries to hide the group, but Danny sees them sneak out of the house. Kathy pretends she didn't see them and Danny thinks he's now seeing things. Kathy confesses the kids were real. Rusty goes to see Phil to get some advice on being an agent. Rusty gets Phil and Danny to listen to the group sing. Danny loves them and wants to use them on the Sullivan show. Phil tries to negotiate with Rusty for their contract. Songs: The Four Angels perform "Back in Your Own Backyard" and "Chattanooga Choo Choo". Amanda Randolph sings "I'm Gonna Sit Right Down and Write Myself a Letter".
240	22	"The Dog Walkers"	Sheldon Leonard	Fred S. Fox & Iz Elinson	March 6, 1961
Kathy tells Danny that Rusty will be late for dinner because he's working. He's trying to earn money for a new camera he wants. Danny is very proud even though he learns Rusty is walking dogs. Rusty comes home and says he got fired. He doesn't know what he did wrong. Mrs. Sherman, the woman who owns the dog Rusty walked, comes by. She says that Rusty didn't do anything wrong. Mrs. Sherman says that José (Bill Dana), the building's elevator operator, walks all the other dogs in the building. When she changed to Rusty, José made things very difficult for her when she wanted to use the elevator. Kathy gets very upset and wants Danny to talk to José. José comes by and he denies intimidating Mrs. Sherman. The next day, Danny comes home with a dog for Rusty to walk. Louise walks in with two dogs. Kathy comes home with four dogs. Linda comes by with a dog. Rusty arrives with two dogs. Mrs. Sherman brings her dog back. José comes by and would like to split the business. He says he needs the money, but Danny sends him away. Danny learns that the new janitor's assistant is José's brother. Danny finds out that José has been helping pay for his brother's school. Feeling bad, Danny gets José to take all the dog business back.
241	23	"The Scrubwoman"	Sheldon Leonard	David Adler	March 13, 1961
Danny is showing Charley part of his act. He is interrupted by Nelly O'Brien (Pert Kelton), his Irish scrub woman, who is vacuuming. She starts dancing and when Danny tells her to stop, she starts crying. Kathy tries to comfort her. Nelly tells them that back in Ireland a Jamie O'Shaughnessy (Harry Shannon) asked her to marry him. She didn't want the life of house keeping. She wanted to become a famous singer and dancer. That obviously didn't happen. Nelly admits she's been writing home to Jamie that she is a successful musical theater performer. She wrote that she lives in an expensive apartment. She made up a loving family of a daughter and her famous entertainer husband. She has two grandchildren, a boy and a girl. Nelly says that Jamie is arriving in New York tomorrow. Danny and Kathy agree to be her family. Jamie arrives and the family does what they can to impress him. Charley comes by and begs Nelly to perform at the Copa. Nelly says that her family needs her more. Jamie says that he's leaving. He was hoping that Nelly made it all up and would come back with him. Danny finds a way to keep up the charade and also have Nelly leave with Jamie. Later, Jamie confesses to Danny that he had found out from a cousin that Nelly was a scrub woman. Song: Danny sings "Carolina in the Morning".
242	24	"Everything Happens to Me"	Sheldon Leonard	Jack Elinson & Charles Stewart	March 27, 1961
This episode spawned The Joey Bishop Show. Danny complains to Kathy that he has 5 days to plan a show in Hollywood. Danny arrives in Hollywood and tries to get a room from the Hotel Assistant Manager (Richard Deacon). The Manager says there's no reservation for him and the hotel is full. Danny calls J. R. Willoughby (Joe Flynn), who asked him to do the show. Danny complains that no one met him at the airport. Willoughby says that Joey Mason (Joey Bishop) was supposed to meet him. Just then Joey shows up at the hotel. He apologizes for not being at the airport. Joey forgot to make the reservation. Danny is dead tired and keeps falling asleep. Joey lives with his family, but he will take Danny there. Joey's Father (Billy Gilbert) and Mother (Madge Blake) prepare for their arrival. When they arrive, Joey's sister Stella (Marlo Thomas) shows Danny where to wash up. Joey tells his Father that Danny is a very important man. Joey has lost a lot of jobs lately and doesn't want to lose this one. Danny just wants to go to sleep, but Father keeps talking to him. Danny took two sleeping pills by mistake. Willoughby comes by and wants to take Danny to his house. The next day, Willoughby suggests doing a show about what happened to Danny the night before. Joey doesn't like the idea of them making fun of his family. Danny sides with Joey and likes his idea for the show. Mary Lee Dearring as Julie.
243	25	"Old Man Danny"	Sheldon Leonard	David Adler	April 3, 1961
Danny asks the band to play the song a little slower. Harry, Danny's Rehearsal Bandleader, jokes and tells him he's getting old. Charley introduces young singer Paul Pryor (Paul Anka) to Danny. After he sings a song, Danny and Charley tell him he's hired. Paul is sincerely happy to be working with Danny, but his compliments make Danny feel old. Danny comes home and wants to do some young dances with Kathy, but he soon gets winded. Danny tries to make himself look younger. Linda catches him putting on a girdle. Danny starts to make Charley feel old. Kathy tries to lift Danny's spirits. Danny says he's going to fire Paul. Paul comes by and something he says makes Danny feel a lot better. Songs: Paul Anka sings "Swanee" and "Tonight My Love, Tonight". Danny sings "This Is All I Ask". The Orchestra plays a few bars of "The Old Gray Mare".
244	26	"Danny and the Hoodlums"	Sheldon Leonard	David Adler	April 10, 1961
Danny is doing his routine at the club. After the show, Charley tells Danny there's an Eddie Riley (Bert Freed) that says he knows Danny and would like to have a drink with him. Charley realizes that Eddie is a gangster. Danny and Charley join Eddie at his table. Eddie tells them how much he enjoyed the show. Danny then sees Skip Harris (Buddy Lester) at another table. Danny tells Charley he needs to stop letting Skip in the club. Danny says Skip always steals his jokes. Skip comes by the table and manages to insult Eddie. Eddie tells Danny that if he ever needed a favor, let him know. Eddie implies he could do something about Skip. The next day, Kathy sees in the paper that Skip was struck a glancing blow by a hit and run driver. Charley comes by and Danny says Skip's accident may have been just a coincidence. Danny and Charley go to see Skip and warn him about Eddie. Skip doesn't believe him. Later, Skip comes to see Danny and says a flower pot fell from a building and almost hit his head. Skip thinks Danny is behind it all. Danny manages to lock Skip in a closet and he goes to find Eddie. Linda is tricked into letting Skip out. Skip has a hoodlum grab Danny and Charley, but then Eddie shows up. Danny stops Eddie from doing anything to Skip. Songs: Danny sings "From This Moment On". The Orchestra performs "On the Sunny Side of the Street".
245	27	"Rusty's Punishment"	Sheldon Leonard	Harry Crane & Stan Dreben	April 17, 1961
Kathy tells Danny that they will have dinner as soon as Rusty gets back from basketball practice. Danny thought they were confining Rusty to his room for a week because he's behind in history. Classmate Marvin comes by and gives Danny some homework that he did for Rusty. Charley comes by and Danny tells him what Rusty did. Rusty comes home and Danny confronts him about the homework. Danny tells Rusty no more basketball. Rusty says the team is in a championship game. Danny starts getting calls from parents demanding he let Rusty play. Kathy asks Danny to let Rusty play tonight, because otherwise it's unfair to the other boys. Coach Fred Farrell (Kenneth Tobey) and some of the team come by the house. Some Cheerleaders and a Mother (Amzie Strickland) arrive. The Mother says the team hasn't won a championship in 22 years and they need Rusty. Danny kicks them all out. Principal Witkowski (Harry Townes) comes by and says that except for history, Rusty is doing very well in class. Witkowski says that if Rusty passes a test he brought with, he would like Rusty to play tonight. With a little coaching from Danny, Rusty passes. Rusty doesn't think he should play because Danny helped him. Because Rusty showed true character, Danny insists he play. The team wins. Trudi Ames as Cheerleader.
246	28	"The Scoutmaster"	Sheldon Leonard	Jack Elinson & Charles Stewart	April 24, 1961
Landlord Heckendorn comes by to complain about where Danny parked his car. Kathy confesses that she parked in the wrong stall. Rusty comes home in his Boy Scout uniform. Rusty says his Scoutmaster is moving away and they will have to disband the troop. Rusty says Danny should fill in, but he says he's too busy. Later, Rusty tells Danny that Heckendorn volunteered. Rusty is afraid he will be too strict with the boys. Danny and Heckendorn go to see Mr. Wilkes (Robert Carson), the District Scout Leader. Wilkes suggests that each man run a troop for 2 weeks to see who gets on best with the boys. Heckendorn, once being a Major in the Army, really runs the boys ragged. Danny's methods are quite unorthodox, but his boys are very happy. Danny winds up winning the competition. Danny tells Kathy that he has to find someone to fill in for him at the Copa for the weekend. He's taking the scouts camping. Heckendorn comes by to congratulate Danny and give him some advice. Danny comes to realize that Heckendorn really would make a better leader. Wilkes comes by and Danny makes it appear that he would not be a good choice. Wilkes chooses Heckendorn.
247	29	"The Magician"	Sheldon Leonard	Charles Stewart & Jack Elinson	May 1, 1961
Rusty and Linda are rehearsing a magic act. Kathy tells Danny that their school is trying to raise money for the library at the children's hospital. Rusty and Linda want to earn their very own money to donate by doing the magic act. Danny wants to help, but the kids want to do it themselves. Later, Rusty is disappointed because he's using old equipment and some of the tricks are not working. Charley comes by to drop off something for Danny. Charley knows a magician that can help. Rusty would need a set of tails that the friend could rig up with tricks. Kathy comes home with Danny's full dress suit from the cleaners. Charlie says the performance is that evening so they have to go right away. Linda talks Kathy into letting them use Danny's suit. Kathy drives the kids to the school to get some more props. Danny comes home and tells Louise that he's been asked to speak at the United Nations. Danny sees his tails laying on the couch and decides to wear them. While speaking to the delegates, some magic tricks start happening with the suit. Danny is trying to be serious, but the audience is laughing hysterically. The next morning Rusty is upset because his show was ruined and he had to give all the money back. Arnold Fraser (Herb Vigran), from the press, comes by and compliments Danny on his performance at the UN. The release payment to use pictures that Fraser took of Danny is the exact amount that Rusty was hoping to earn.
248	30	"The Woman Behind the Man"	Sheldon Leonard	Iz Elinson & Fred S. Fox	May 8, 1961
Jean and Bess (Amzie Strickland) are visiting Kathy. They brag about how they are the "woman behind the man" and are always solving their husbands problems. Linda asks Kathy what problems she helps Danny with, but Kathy avoids answering. Danny comes home and Kathy gets into a fight with him because he never shares his problems with her. Danny says he will try to get her more involved. Charley calls and tells Danny he still hasn't had Danny's dressing room painted. Danny thinks it's no big deal, but Kathy says he should have told her about this problem. Kathy convinces Danny to be more assertive with Charley. Charley comes by. Kathy has Danny tell him that if the room isn't painted by tomorrow, Danny will not perform. Charley says Danny has a contract and leaves. The next day, Danny and Charley apologize to each other. Just then Kathy comes in with Mr. Thompson (Paul Dubov), Danny's Attorney . Charley thinks Danny double crossed him and they get into a fight again. They threaten to sue each other. Later, they try to make amends, but neither will give in. Danny goes to get things out of his dressing room and Kathy is in there painting. Kathy is sorry she started the whole thing. Charley comes in and helps paint.
249	31	"Teenage Thrush"	Sheldon Leonard	Jack Elinson & Charles Stewart	May 15, 1961
Danny is trying to work on a song. A strange woman comes in the room and Danny wonders who she is. She says she's Mrs. Poloka (Naomi Stevens), the house cleaner. Mrs. Poloka keeps interrupting Danny and he's gets upset. She says she's quitting. Kathy wants Danny to apologize to her. Kathy says she's a very popular cleaning woman and she wants to keep her until Louise returns. A girl named Janine (Brenda Lee) comes by to help clean. Danny starts singing and Janine laughs at him. Janine says she wants to be in show business. She sings for Danny and she is very good. Danny takes her to sing for Charley and he agrees to hire her for the club. Back at home, Rusty wonders why Danny never gives him a chance at show business. Mrs. Poloka comes by and Danny learns she is Janine's mother. Mrs. Poloka doesn't want Janine to be a cleaning woman, she wants her to go to college. Janine wants to quit high school to sing at the club. Mrs. Poloka does sign the contract for Janine to perform at the club. Danny talks Janine into staying in school. He agrees to pay for her college and if she wants to sing after that, she should come and see him. Songs: Danny sings "Oh, How I Miss You Tonight". Brenda sings "It's Never Too Late" and "Dynamite".
250	32	"Party Wrecker"	Sheldon Leonard	Harry Crane & Stan Dreben	May 22, 1961
It is the morning of Danny's birthday and he is still asleep. Mr. Heckendorn comes by and asks Kathy how many people she invited to the party. The people are to meet in Heckendorn's apartment. Kathy thanks him for having Danny's surprise party in his place. Danny wakes up and Kathy and the kids give him presents. Danny is getting his mail in the lobby. A delivery man asks Danny where Heckendorn's apartment is. Then a Drummer (Jess Kirkpatrick) and a Double Bass Player (Johnny Silver) ask Danny the same thing. Danny tells Kathy that Heckendorn is having a party and wonders why they were not invited. Not knowing that Danny is home, Heckendorn comes by wearing a party hat. Heckendorn says he is just having a small party. Danny hints at getting an invitation, but Heckendorn does not say anything. Kathy finds Danny in the lobby spying on who is arriving for Heckendorn's party. Danny wonders why so many of his friends are going to the party. Charley comes by and Danny wonders why he is also going to Heckendorn's. Danny tells Kathy that he wants to have a birthday party with just the two of them. Danny is having some champagne with Kathy and music starts coming from Heckendorn's place. Danny calls Heckendorn and tells him to hold down the noise. Danny tells Kathy that he also called the police. Kathy runs to Heckendorn's place and everyone is gone. Danny feels bad when he learns the party was for him. Danny and Kathy go back to their place and everyone is there. Harry Ruby as Himself. Songs: Danny sings "Three O'Clock in the Morning" and "For He's a Jolly Good Fellow".

=== Season 9 (1961–62) ===
No. overall	No. in season	Title	Directed by	Written by	Original release date
251	1	"For Every Man There's a Woman"	Sheldon Leonard	Jack Elinson & Charles Stewart	October 2, 1961
Elevator operator Jose Jimenez (Bill Dana) tells Danny he's reading "Romeo and Juliet". Jose says he's in love with a woman who is a baby nurse on the 12th floor, but he doesn't know her name. He hasn't even spoken to her. Later, Jose reads a love letter that he wrote to the woman to Danny and Kathy. It isn't very good. Kathy thinks Danny should help Jose. Danny reluctantly agrees to write a letter for him. Jose gets a letter back from her and she wants to meet him. Jose talks Danny into writing another letter. Jose then wants to record a song for her and he asks Danny to be his musical director. Jose doesn't sing very well and wants Danny to sing the song. Jose gets another letter from the woman and they will meet that night. He would like to meet her in Danny's apartment. Jose wants to tell her he didn't write the letters and didn't sing the song. He would like Danny and Kathy as support. The woman comes by and Danny winds up doing the explaining. Jose finally introduces himself and says he has an accent. She introduces herself as Hilda Schmetterling and she has a German accent. Songs: Danny sings "The More I See You". Bill sings "June in January".
252	2	"Linda Runs Away"	Sheldon Leonard	David Adler	October 9, 1961
Kathy is punishing Linda by not letting her watch TV for 3 weeks. Linda threatens to run away. Danny and Charley come home and Linda is very sweet to Danny. Danny sides with Kathy and Linda says no one loves her. Danny tells Kathy not to worry about, Linda is only bluffing. Rusty says that Linda is packing. Danny still thinks Linda is not going anywhere, but then she walks out of the apartment with a suitcase. Danny says maybe they should let her leave to let her see how tough it would be. Danny comes up with a plan to have him and Charley wear disguises and follow Linda. When Kathy is out of the house, Danny lets Linda leave. A disguised Charley talks to Linda in the park about how sad he is because his daughter ran away. Then a disguised Danny tells Linda that he's looking for his parents, because long ago he ran away. Linda gets upset when Danny takes away a candy bar she had. A Policeman (Ken Lynch) comes by and takes Danny and Charley into custody. Linda runs off. Back at the house, Kathy is upset with Danny because of his failed scheme. Just then Linda comes out of her room. Later, Danny finds out that Linda knew it was him and Charley all along. Song: Danny and Angela sing "Be Kind to Your Parents".
253	3	"Love Letters"	Sheldon Leonard	Charles Stewart & Jack Elinson	October 16, 1961
Kathy is looking at some of Danny's old love letters to her. Danny comes home. Kathy is feeling romantic and would like a kiss, but Danny is dead tired. She reads him one of his letters. Danny worries how embarrassed he would be if someone else were to see those letters. Meanwhile, Linda tells Rusty she's playing mailman. Rusty reminds her that she got in trouble the last time she did that. Linda says that instead of taking new letters, she's using old ones. Later, a Jay Sandrich (Dick Wessel), from the building, comes by. He accuses Danny of writing love letters to his wife and pinches Danny's nose. Kathy then accuses Danny of taking her love letters. Linda comes in and asks Kathy for more letters. They realize what happened. Mr. Webb (Herb Ellis) comes by and returns one of the letters. He makes fun of what Danny wrote. More and more people come by. Danny eventually wears a disguise so they can't laugh at him. Kathy is very hurt that Danny now thinks the letters are silly. Something Linda says makes Danny realize he should be proud of how he feels about Kathy. Naomi Stevens as Mrs. Sol Schwartz. Hazel Shermet as Mrs. Green. Trudi Ames as 1st Girl Returning Letters. Songs: Danny sings "Blue Skies" and "Day by Day".
254	4	"The Trumpet Player"	Sheldon Leonard	Jack Elinson & Charles Stewart	October 23, 1961
Charley comes by and complains to Kathy about the noise the decorators are making at his club. Charley is happy to be somewhere quiet. Just then Rusty starts playing the drums. Danny says Rusty has to practice because he has an audition for the band at the YMCA. Danny and Rusty go to see Larry Norman (Harry James), the band leader. When Larry mentions the band could use some more instruments, Danny says he could borrow some from the Copa. Danny has Rusty show Larry some fast drum playing. Larry says he likes to teach the boys the basics and they all pull together. Larry has Rusty play with the band and Rusty is not keeping time with the song. Larry says that Rusty's teacher obviously just taught him to be flashy and didn't teach the fundamentals of music. Danny says that he was Rusty's teacher. Danny takes offense and makes Rusty leave, even though Rusty wants to stay. Danny is rehearsing with the band at the Copa when Larry comes by. Larry still wants to borrow some instruments and Danny becomes very obnoxious. Danny winds up apologizing, but does make a crack about Larry's trumpet playing. Larry plays the trumpet and he is incredible. The next day, Danny and Charley offer Larry a job at the Copa. Larry wants to stay and work with the kids. Songs: Rusty plays drums to "My Blue Heaven". Rusty on drums with The Laurel Hall Hornets plays "O du lieber Augustin". Danny sings "From This Moment On". Harry James performs "Flight of the Bumblebee".
255	5	"Tonoose vs. Daly"	Sheldon Leonard	Fred Fox & Iz Elinson	October 30, 1961
Kathy's father, Mr. Daly (William Demarest), is visiting. Danny tells the kids to be quiet because Daly needs his rest. Suddenly Uncle Tonoose (Hans Conried) bursts in. He is anything but quiet and says he can stay a week. Tonoose and Daly start arguing and insulting each other. Each wants the other to leave. Danny gets them to make peace. Louise asks Daly to open a bottle for her, but he can't get it open. Tonoose then opens it. They start arguing over who is stronger and begin wrestling. They decide the only way to resolve the issue is hold an Olympic competition. The next morning the men come home all worn out. Rusty was keeping score and the men are tied. They say the main event will be this afternoon. Kathy wants them to stop. Danny finds ways to make Daly and Tonoose think they lost their strength. The men then rest for two days. They then argue over who is sicker. Danny and Kathy admit that they tricked them. Daly and Tonoose actually have a laugh over it, but continue arguing.
256	6	"Hen-Pecked Charley"	Sheldon Leonard	Charles Stewart & Jack Elinson	November 13, 1961
Danny and Kathy have Charley and Bunny (Pat Carroll) Halper over for dinner. Bunny is bossing Charley around and will not let him do anything. The next morning, Danny tells Kathy that he's going to try and get Charley to stand up to Bunny. Kathy thinks he should mind his own business. Despite promising not to, Danny goes to talk to Bunny. He tells her that she is smothering Charley and hurting his masculine pride. Bunny did not realize that was what she was doing and she will change. The Halpers are over for dinner again and Bunny is letting Charley eat and drink whatever he wants. Charley wonders why Bunny is acting like this now. The next day, Charley is surprised when Bunny wants him to decide where they will go on vacation. Charley starts to think that there is another man and Bunny wants a divorce. To prove she loves him, Bunny starts bossing Charley around again and he is happy. Songs: Danny sings "I Want to Be Happy" and "Make Someone Happy".
257	7	"Danny Weaves a Web"	Sheldon Leonard	Harry Crane & Stan Dreben	November 20, 1961
Danny has mechanic Freddy (Jack Albertson) fix a dent in his car's fender. Danny doesn't have enough money on him to pay the bill. He can't write a check because Kathy would find out. Danny teased Kathy to no end when she put a scratch in the car. Danny tells Charlie he will use the housekeeping money Kathy keeps in a jar. He will replace it as soon as he can get to the bank. Danny catches Rusty in a lie and tells him it will only get him in trouble. Kathy comes home and she needs to pay the Cab Driver (Herbie Faye). She goes to get money out of the jar and finds it empty. When she asks Danny if he took it, he lies and says no. After Danny leaves, Kathy calls the police. Lt. Braddock (Stacy Harris) comes by and thinks the grocery delivery boy may have taken the money. Braddock also questions Rusty and Charley. Joey (Bill Bixby), the delivery boy, comes by. Braddock questions him, but lets him go. After Braddock questions Rusty some more, Danny finally confesses. Danny has Freddy come by to back up his story. Things get confusing, but Braddock finally believes Danny. Later, Kathy admits that she put the dent in the fender.
258	8	"Danny and Durante"	Sheldon Leonard	Jack Elinson & Charles Stewart	November 27, 1961
Jimmy Durante's associates, Mack (Bill Bixby) and Benny (Ned Glass) are arguing over a song for Jimmy. Jimmy tells them now that his niece Carla is back from college, he wants dignity and decorum. Danny and Kathy come by for dinner and Jimmy starts bragging about Carla. Jimmy tells them that Carla graduated with top honors and the college is holding a big banquet for her. Carla says that Jimmy isn't going because he thinks he doesn't fit in with that educated crowd. Carla is sad because Jimmy wants her to go live with her Aunt Julia in Boston. Julia keeps company with educated people. Carla doesn't want to go. Danny reminds Jimmy that he raised Carla. Danny thinks he can help Jimmy fit in with Carla's college friends. Danny gets Jimmy some more elegant clothes. Danny gives Jimmy a crash course in art and literature. While Jimmy appreciates what Danny is doing, he doesn't think it's working. Carla says how much she's looking forward to Jimmy going to the banquet. At the banquet Jimmy tries mingling but he isn't doing well. Jimmy wants to leave and Danny tells him to just be himself. Danny gets him to perform and he's a hit. Mary Lee Dearring as Nightclub College Patron. Hal England as Nightclub College Patron. Songs: "Torna a Surriento" Performed by Gina Genardi (vocal), with Jimmy Durante on piano. Jimmy performs "Prelude In C Major", "Inka Dinka Doo", "First You Tip Your Hat-ta". Gina sings "You Gotta Start Off Each Day with a Song".
259	9	"Danny and the Brownies"	Sheldon Leonard	Ray Singer & Dick Chevillat	December 4, 1961
Kathy complains that Danny didn't help her prepare for Linda's brownie troop picnic. Danny is supposed to go golfing with Charley. A little girl named Susan (Susan Gordon) comes by and says she hasn't decided if she wants to be a brownie. Susan has a very bratty attitude. Kathy tells Danny that Susan's mother is a poor widow with four children to support. The rest of the brownies show up. Kathy twists her ankle on a rug that Danny didn't tack down. Kathy will not be able to go on the picnic. Danny reluctantly agrees to go in her place. Danny guilt's Charley into going with. Out in the park, the girls start setting things up. A Policeman (George O'Hanlon) shows them a "Keep Of The Grass" sign and tells them to move on. The girls guilt him into letting them stay. Danny is starting a fire. The Policeman returns and shows Danny a "No Open Fires" sign. Charley realizes that Susan is pulling up the signs. Susan picks some flowers she wasn't supposed to and gets Danny and Charley in trouble again. The Policeman takes them to see Judge Tolliver (Paul Maxey). Danny won't tell on Susan. Linda tries to take the blame for what happened. Susan admits to being the one who picked the flowers and the Judge dismisses the case.
260	10	"Tonoose's Plot"	Sheldon Leonard	Danny Simon & Mel Tolkin	December 11, 1961
Danny and Kathy are leaving for dinner and the theater and they are running late. Just then Uncle Tonoose shows up and says he's left Toledo forever. Apparently all the family members chipped in and bought a piece of land as a cemetery. Tonoose thought that as head of the family he should have a nice plot up on a hill. He was given a very bad plot and Cousin Habib got the nice plot. Kathy says they don't have a room for him in the house. Louise is having her apartment painted and is staying with them. Tonoose will sleep on the coach. Tonoose says he will live with them for a couple years. Tonoose does wind up sleeping in Danny and Kathy's room. They will sleep in the living room. After a few days, Tonoose redecorates the apartment. Because of something Tonoose told Linda, she flunked a history test. Rusty gets a black eye because of advice Tonoose gave him. Kathy tells Danny that he needs to get rid of Tonoose. Danny calls Habib and gets him to let Tonoose have the hill plot. But because of something Danny said, Tonoose now wants the bad plot.
261	11	"Keeping Up With the Joneses"	Sheldon Leonard	Charles Stewart & Jack Elinson	December 18, 1961
Charley and Bunny drop by. Bunny shows Kathy the new earrings Charley bought her for no reason at all. After they leave, Kathy mentions to Danny that he has not bought her jewelry in years. The next night, Danny gives Kathy a pearl necklace. Charley and Bunny come by and Bunny notices the necklace right away. Later at home, Bunny wonders how Danny, as the employee, can buy a more expensive gift than Charley, the employer. Bunny finds a way to have Charley buy her some more jewelry. Charley goes to see Maurice the Jeweler. Charley wants to buy something that costs more than what Danny spent there. This starts a buying war between Danny and Charley. Danny comes up with a plan to make it look as though he and Charley are going into debt to buy more and more expensive things. They will rent jewelry and furs and tell the wives they cashed in bonds and life insurance policies. When Danny tells Kathy that he used Rusty's college fund, she says she doesn't want anything anymore. Kathy and Bunny go to return everything and find out from Maurice they were rented. They get back at the men by claiming they want to keep everything. Later, they tell the men they know about the rentals. Johnny Silver as Jewelry Customer. Song: Danny and Marjorie sing "My Baby Just Cares For Me".
262	12	"Teacher for a Day"	Sheldon Leonard	Jack Elinson & Charles Stewart	December 25, 1961
Danny tells Kathy that he's going to be the toastmaster at the Sports Writers Luncheon. Danny wants to take Rusty along. Rusty says that his teacher, Miss Johnson (Mabel Albertson) "Mrs. Picklepuss", is keeping the whole class after school tomorrow. He won't be able to go with Danny. Danny goes to talk to her. Miss Johnson believes her methods work and won't let Rusty off. She thinks that Danny feels he could do her job better. She tells Danny that the PTA is running a program where the parents are teachers for a day. It's the day Danny is teaching and the class is not cooperating. Danny does a comic routine and the kids love it. He sings a song and has them dance. The class agrees to be very courteous when Miss Johnson returns. Believing Danny did a better job than her, she decides to retire. Danny gets the class to admit they just fooled around all day. He also gets the class to understand how important learning is. Veronica Cartwright as Veronica. Songs: Rusty's classmates sing "Dem Bones". Danny sings "Rip It Up".
263	13	"A Baby for Charley"	Sheldon Leonard	David Adler	January 1, 1962
Danny, Bunny and Charley are deciding which movie to go see. Kathy says the babysitter canceled on them and Louise is on vacation. Charley complains about how kids always ruin plans. They cannot go to the movies the next night because Danny and Kathy have a PTA meeting. Charley suggests the four go on a vacation to Acapulco. Kathy reminds them that Louise is gone. Charley continues to complain about kids. Bunny tells Kathy that she's going to have a baby and she's worried about what Charley will say. Later, Kathy tells Danny about Bunny. Danny thinks they should have Charley spend a day with Rusty and Linda, to see how much fun kids are. Charley and Bunny come by and the kids are extra nice to Charley. But things go wrong and the kids make a mess all over. Danny and the kids take Charley to the park and things don't go well there either. Bunny is tired of Charley's attitude and lets it slip that she's having a baby. Charley is thrilled. Songs: Danny sings "Wiegenlied (Lullaby) Op. 49 No. 4". Angela sings "Rock-a-bye Baby".
264	14	"Useless Charley"	Sheldon Leonard	Danny Simon & Mel Tolkin	January 8, 1962
Bunny, Danny and Kathy are discussing the upcoming baby. Charley comes by and is upset that Bunny will not take any of his suggestions for the baby. Meanwhile, Rusty is building a rocket for a school project. Charley wants to help Rusty with it, but Rusty says it's very delicate. Charley winds up destroying the rocket. Now he's convinced he will not be a good father. No one will listen to Charley's idea for the baby's room. At the Club, scrub woman Jenny (Hope Summers) asks Charley a favor, but he says he has enough problems. Danny comes by and tries to make Charley feel better. Danny tells Charley he can teach him everything he needs to know about a new born. Things go well at first, but then Charley loses confidence and leaves. Charley learns from Bunny how much she needs him and he feels better. Song: Danny sings "Little Lady Make Believe".
265	15	"Linda, the Tomboy"	Sheldon Leonard	Iz Elinson & Fred S. Fox	January 15, 1962
Charley hopes the baby is a boy and he's trying to pick a name. Danny tells Charley how nice it is to have a sweet, dainty little girl. Just then Linda comes home wearing boy's clothes and she has a black eye. She was playing football with the boys and got hit by the ball. Kathy is not upset at all. Kathy tells Danny that Linda was playing with Scottie Parks because she hopes he will ask her to the party on Saturday. Scottie comes by and Danny keeps dropping hints about the party. Little Eloise Johnson comes by and compliments Scottie. They leave together. Danny and Rusty tell Linda she needs to act more like a girl if she wants Scottie to ask her to the party. Charley comes by and asks Danny about some other boys names. Danny kicks him out because he's busy with Linda. Later, Scottie comes by and Linda is wearing a dress and acting more feminine. Scottie makes fun of the way Linda is acting and she hits him. Scottie is impressed with how hard she can hit and asks her to the party.
266	16	"The Big Fight"	Sheldon Leonard	Danny Simon & Mel Tolkin	January 22, 1962
Danny, Kathy, Charley, Bunny and Phil are celebrating the signing of Danny and Charley's new contract. Phil says he's going to see a comic named Al Kay at a place called the Ace of Clubs. Charley recalls that the club is a bit of a dive. Kathy and Bunny get into an argument over which husband works harder. Danny gets the women to apologize to each other. But then Danny and Charley get into the same argument. Phil comes back because he needs their initials on the contract. Danny and Charley tear the contract up. Danny winds up working at the Ace of Clubs. Phil tells Kathy that Danny is doing well there. Phil is upset with Danny because the Copa is now going broke. Danny decides to go back to the Copa, but they need to figure out a way. They need to make it look as though Danny was in trouble. Phil admits to Kathy that he made up that the Copa was going broke. Bunny convinces Charley that Danny is going broke. Danny goes to see Charley. Because of something that scrub woman Jenny does, Danny and Charley admit they were both putting on an act. Despite both doing well, they know they need each other.
267	17	"Casanova Tonoose"	Sheldon Leonard	David Adler	January 29, 1962
Uncle Tonoose arrives and announces that he is getting married in April. He wants Danny to be the best man. When Kathy asks who the woman is, Tonoose says he doesn't know. Tonoose has been corresponding with a matrimonial service. They send him pictures of women to choose from. If he finds one he likes, he wants Danny to introduce him to the woman. It's an old Lebanese custom that the groom does not approach the bride, his best friend introduces them. Danny introduces Tonoose to Mrs. Marshall (Ann Tyrrell). Tonoose does not make a good impression. It's been several days and several more women. Danny calls the matrimonial service and learns that Tonoose has been making outrageous requests of the women. The women just don't like Tonoose. Danny tries to show Tonoose how to act around a lady. Danny introduces Tonoose to Miss Hotchkiss (Amzie Strickland) and things go much better. Tonoose now wants to go back to Toledo to have the women there meet the "new" Tonoose.
268	18	"Charley Does It Himself"	Sheldon Leonard and Danny Thomas	Ray Singer & Dick Chevillat	February 5, 1962
Danny sees Kathy knitting baby booties and thinks she is expecting. The booties are for Bunny's baby. Charley and Bunny come by and they are arguing. Bunny's brother has offered to decorate the nursery for them. Charley insists on doing it himself. Danny tells Charley that he is not handy enough. Danny suggests that Charley does the work and Danny will supervise. Charley starts wallpapering and it is not going well. Danny arrives and cannot believe what he sees. By the end of the day, Charley thinks the place looks horrible. Danny tells him things will settle and look much better. They go to the club to relax. Bunny and Kathy see the room and are horrified. Kathy calls a decorator friend of hers to fix things during the night. The next morning Danny and Charley see the beautiful room. Their egos make them think they did a good job. Charley wants to redecorate Linda's room.
269	19	"The P.T.A. Bash"	Sheldon Leonard	Charles Stewart & Jack Elinson	February 12, 1962
Kathy is at a P.T.A. committee meeting and is the entertainment chairman. She tells the people that the entertainment she had planned for the next meeting fell through at the last minute. Mrs. Brown (Maudie Prickett) suggests getting Danny. Kathy says that Danny is rehearsing night and day for the Ed Sullivan Show. Kathy tells Principal Phelps (Olan Soule) that she will get Danny to perform somehow. After a hint that Kathy makes, Danny says there's no way he can perform at the meeting. Kathy claims that she, Rusty and Linda will perform. They do a little joke routine and Danny thinks it's terrible. Danny agrees to perform. He will do some funny heckling while Kathy gives a speech. When Phelps hears what Kathy plans to do, he's worried that Superintendent Whitehall will not like it. At the meeting, Danny does his routine and the members think it's hilarious. Afterwards, Whitehall thinks it was disgraceful and blames Phelps. Danny tells Whitehall that laughter is a good thing. Whitehall changes his mind when he learns what a success everyone else thought the meeting was. Nancy Kulp as Mrs. Keltner. Barbara Pepper as Fat Lady. Song: Danny sings "Thinking of You".
270	20	"A Nose by Any Other Name"	Danny Thomas	Ray Singer & Dick Chevillat	February 19, 1962
Danny and Charley tell Kathy that Danny will do a routine about his nose. Kathy doesn't think it's funny. Danny tells Charley that he thinks Kathy is embarrassed by his nose. He even thinks the kids are bothered by his nose. Charley thinks Danny is overreacting. Danny goes to see Dr. Crawford (Lyle Talbot), a plastic surgeon. Dr. Crawford thinks Danny should keep his nose the way it is, but reluctantly agrees to do the operation. Charley tells Kathy that he got a message from Danny saying he can't perform for the next two weeks. Danny comes home with his nose all bandaged. Charley says he's fired and leaves. The family is very upset when they see what Danny did. For three days, the family doesn't talk to Danny. Kathy tells Danny she loved him the way he was. Dr. Crawford comes by to change the bandage. Crawford shows the family Danny's nose and they love it. Crawford didn't do anything and faked the operation. He knew Danny didn't really want it changed. Songs: Danny sings "An Ode To My Nose" Sung to the tune of "Mighty Lak' a Rose" with special lyrics. He also sings "Don't Change (Stay As You Are)".
271	21	"Casanova Junior"	Sheldon Leonard	Jack Elinson & Charles Stewart	February 26, 1962
Rusty tells his parents that he's not going to the class dance. Linda says he's afraid of girls. Kathy says that she thought Sally (Pamela Beaird) was his girlfriend. Rusty calls Sally but can't bring himself to ask her. Kathy and Danny try to boost Rusty's confidence. Kathy works on Rusty's dancing. Danny gives him some pointers on how to talk to a girl. After the dance, Rusty comes home and says he danced with Sally and a lot of other girls. Later, Kathy says that girls have been calling Rusty all day and he's treating them like dirt. Sally comes by and hopes that Rusty will take her to the basketball game. Rusty doesn't treat her well. Danny tells him he needs to be a gentlemen, but Rusty still has an attitude. Danny has a plan and includes friends Darlene Dorsey (Ann Barnes) and Tommy (Jimmy Baird). Danny has Darlene flirt with Rusty. When he makes a play for her, she treats him like a child. Tommy comes in and also laughs at Rusty. Rusty now knows what it feels like to be treated like dirt. Songs: Danny sings "I Wonder What's Become Of Sally?". Ann Barnes sings "You Do Something to Me".
272	22	"Temper, Temper"	Sheldon Leonard	Charles Stewart & Jack Elinson	March 5, 1962
Danny yells at Kathy when she used his golf club as a fireplace poker. Bunny tells Kathy that Charley bought her an expensive ring after he yelled at her and she started crying. Bunny asks Kathy if she ever got that expensive hat she was looking at. Bunny tells Kathy to get into another argument with Danny and start crying. He will buy her that hat. Danny tells Charley what Kathy did to his club. Charley says that he's changing his ways after he made Bunny cry. Danny says he didn't make Kathy cry, but he still feels bad. Danny vows to not lose his temper anymore. At home, Kathy tries to start a fight by saying she didn't make any dinner. Danny remains calm. The next morning Kathy again tries to get Danny mad, but he still is calm. Danny tells Charley that he thinks Kathy is trying to get him mad. Bunny tells Kathy to pretend that she gave away Danny's golf clubs. Danny gets upset but doesn't yell. Kathy starts crying anyway. Danny does buy Kathy the hat, but she cannot except it. When Bunny opens the package, the hat is not there, just a pair of Danny's starched shorts. Danny found his clubs and realized what Kathy was up to. Danny does get her the hat.
273	23	"Hunger Strike"	Sheldon Leonard	Leo Solomon & Ben Gershman	March 12, 1962
When Rusty gives Danny great compliments about his singing, Danny knows Rusty wants something. Turns out Rusty wants to go on an overnight saddle trip next weekend and he needs Danny's permission. Danny turns him down. Rusty doesn't come out of his room, even to eat. Rusty tells Danny that he's on a hunger strike. What Danny and Kathy don't know is that Linda is sneaking Rusty food. Kathy brings Rusty some food, but he's too full to eat it all. Rusty tells her that Danny is treating him like a child. Louise then sneaks some food in for Rusty and insists he eat all of it. It's late that night and Danny is worried about Rusty. Danny checks on him and tells Rusty he needs to eat. Rusty wants Danny to read a composition he wrote for American History. Something Rusty wrote makes Danny realize he was being over protective and unfair. Danny lets Rusty go on the trip. Rusty comes home from the trip tired and sore from riding a horse all weekend. Song: Danny sings "The Nearness Of You".
274	24	"Bunny Cooks a Meal"	Sheldon Leonard	Jack Elinson & Charles Stewart	March 19, 1962
Danny and Kathy are at Charley and Bunny's place playing bridge. Charley gets a call from his cousin Herman (Louis Nye) in California. Herman will be coming to town and would like to come to dinner. Charley tries to make an excuse, but it doesn't workout. Charley tells Danny and Kathy that Herman is a famous Chef and owns a fancy restaurant. Herman tried to stop Charley's wedding years ago when he learned that Bunny couldn't cook. Charley has been writing letters to him about the wonderful cook Bunny has become. Of course it's not true. Kathy says that her and Louise will teach Bunny how to cook. Bunny's first dinner did not turn out well and she's very disappointed. As Herman arrives the next day, Danny comes up with a plan. Kathy and Louise will hide in the kitchen and cook the meal and Bunny will pretend she did it. The next night, Herman arrives. Bunny is very nervous. Herman keeps wanting to go to the kitchen and everyone tries to stop him. Herman eventually gets to the kitchen and sees Kathy and Louise. Bunny confesses that she can't cook. Charley tells off Herman. Song: Danny, Sid, and Pat sing "Ain't We Got Fun".
275	25	"Jose's Protege"	Sheldon Leonard	Charles Stewart & Jack Elinson	March 26, 1962
Danny is looking for some children to act in his upcoming TV special. Danny is upset that somehow it wound up in the paper. He will be overwhelmed with stage mothers and kids. Rusty and Linda wonder why Danny doesn't use them. Herbie the Mailman (Herbie Faye) brings by two girls to sing for Danny. Danny tells Elevator operator Jose Jimenez that if parents with kids come looking for him, he is to tell them that Danny is out of town. Jose brings Manuel Ramon Cardenas, his nephew, to Danny's home. Danny will not see Manuel because he's had no experience. Jose does nice things for Kathy in hopes she can talk Danny into seeing Manuel. Danny finally agrees to audition Manuel. Manuel does a tap dance for Danny and he's not very good. Jose arrives and Danny tries to kindly tell him the boy has no talent. Manuel tells Jose Danny was right. Manuel only did the tap dance because he thought that's what Danny wanted. Turns out Manuel is an excellent flamenco dancer. Danny will use him in the show. Songs: Linda MacGregor and Robin MacGregor sing "High Hopes". Danny's orchestra, conducted by Earle Hagen, perform "When You're Smiling".
276	26	"Danny and Bob Hope Get Away from It All"	Sheldon Leonard	Jack Elinson & Charles Stewart	April 2, 1962
Autograph seekers follow Danny and Bob Hope up to Danny's apartment. Bob thinks he and Danny should take a vacation. Rusty and Linda want to charge their friends to come up and see them, but Kathy will not let them. Kathy then asks Danny and Bob to perform at the Hospital benefit. The next day, Bob takes Danny to a little out of the way restaurant. Still, the Waiter (Stanley Adams) recognizes them and asks them to perform. Bob and Danny go to a hotel in a small town for a vacation. Mr. Harland, the owner, doesn't recognize them and Bob is a little surprised. It's been three days and Bob and Danny can't believe Harlan still doesn't know who they are. Harlan tells them that there's going to be a big talent show at the town auditorium that night. They decide to perform. No one in the audience recognizes them. Harlan winds up winning the talent contest with his duck calls. Renie Riano as Autograph Hound. Songs: Bob sings "Thanks for the Memory". Danny sings "From This Moment On".
277	27	"Extrasensory Charley"	Sheldon Leonard	Leo Solomon & Ben Gershman	April 9, 1962
Bunny and Charley are at Danny's place. They were all going on a picnic, but it started to rain. Bunny wants to play charades. While Bunny gets something, Charley tells the others that he wants to play a prank on Bunny. They will all make wild guesses. When it's her turn, Bunny gets frustrated and angry. Linda lets it slip that they played a trick on Bunny. Bunny finds out it was Charley's idea. Bunny gets even by getting the others to help convince Charley he has ESP. Later, Bunny and Charley come by. Bunny wants them to tell Charley it was all a gag and he doesn't have ESP. Charley bet $10,000 on a long shot horse that is racing later that day. Bunny tells Danny that he has half the bet. To get the money, Charley mortgaged the Copa. They finally convince Charley they were fooling him. They turn on the TV to watch the race. Charley's horse comes from behind to win. Everyone is ecstatic. Charley says he never made the bet, he was just getting back at them. Song: Danny, Marjorie, Rusty, Angela, Sid, and Pat sing "Old MacDonald Had a Farm".
278	28	"Kathy, the Pro"	Sheldon Leonard	Charles Stewart & Jack Elinson	April 16, 1962
Bunny is visiting with Kathy. Kathy would like her to stay longer, but Bunny has to go to the club to check the books. Kathy offers to help Rusty with his homework, but he will have a friend help instead. Linda doesn't want her help sewing a doll's dress. Kathy tells Danny she doesn't feel the family needs her. Danny insists she come to the club and give him some suggestions about his act. At the club, Danny introduces Kathy and has her do a dance. The audience loved it. The next day there's a flattering write-up in the paper about Kathy. Charley and Danny talk about how Danny had the article put in the paper to boost Kathy's ego. Danny's plan backfires when Kathy says she wants to join the act. The next day, Charley tells Kathy that he cannot afford to pay her at this time. Kathy says she doesn't need to be paid. With Louise gone for a month, Kathy will hire a housekeeper. Danny decides to hire an actress to be a lousy housekeeper. Henrietta Bixby (Minerva Urecal) arrives and is immediately annoying and demanding. Kathy kicks her out. Kathy decides to stay a housewife. Kathy then finds out that Henrietta was an actress. Songs: Danny sings "That Face" and "Pretty Baby".
279	29	"A Promise is a Promise"	Sheldon Leonard	Harry Crane & Stan Dreben and Arthur Stander	April 23, 1962
Charley is coming over and Danny is looking for his tape recorder. Kathy finds it in an obvious place. Danny tells Charley that he has a great routine on the recorder that he wants to do for the Ed Sullivan Show. Linda comes in and says her teacher picked her and two other kids to go on Art Linkletter's Kids Say the Darnedest Things TV program. Danny promises she can go on. Danny plays the tape and part way through, Linda is on it. Danny told her not to mess with the recorder. He gives her a little spanking and Kathy is not happy about it. He also grounds her for the weekend. Linda reminds Danny that she is supposed to be on the TV show tomorrow night. Because he promised, Danny will let her go on the show. Charley tells Danny he better make nice with Linda so she doesn't says bad things about him on the show. Danny is going to stop Linda from going, but Kathy talks him out of it. Danny envisions Linda saying a lot of bad things about him. On the actual show, Linda says something funny about Kathy, but nothing about Danny. Now Danny is upset that he didn't get any publicity. Back at home, Linda explains to Danny why she didn't say anything about him and he feels bad. Note: Angela Cartwright's future Lost in Space co-star Bill Mumy appears as one of the audience members.
280	30	"The Smart Aleck"	Sheldon Leonard	Ray Allen Saffian & Harvey Bullock	April 30, 1962
Rusty is helping Linda ask Danny for a new pair of skates. It's going well until Danny reads a letter from Uncle Tonoose. Danny gets upset because Tonoose is sending Danny's cousin Don (Don Penny), who wants help getting into show business. Danny tells Charley that Don will probably very shy and nervous. Don arrives and he's an overconfident, arrogant, smart-aleck. Don doesn't feel he needs to audition. Danny decides to give Don a very tough booking at Madison Square Garden. The next day, Don comes by Danny's place and he's a lot more humble. He says that a director of a theater group in Toledo told him to come on strong. Don was putting on an act in front of Charley. Don in very insecure and needs Danny's help. Danny feels bad for what he thought and has to get Don out of the Square Garden job. Danny has Don do his act at the Copa. Don does quite well. Songs: Danny sings "There's No Business Like Show Business". Don sings "A Tribute To Our American Astronauts".
281	31	"Baby"	Sheldon Leonard	Jack Elinson & Charles Stewart	May 7, 1962
Danny is showing Charley a dance bit he wants to add to the show. All Charley can think about is that Bunny could have the baby at any moment. He panics every time the phone rings. Bunny is showing Kathy some baby clothes she bought. Louise is sure Bunny will have a boy. Danny and Charley come by. Bunny mentions how Charley has not gotten any sleep because he's worrying so much. Danny gives Charley a tranquilizer to calm him down so he can get some sleep. Then he gives him another one. Kathy gives Bunny some tranquilizers and tells her to put one in Charley's drink before he goes to bed. That night, Charley takes two pills not knowing Bunny had given him two already. During the night, Bunny feels she's going to have the baby. She tries to wake up Charley, but he is out. Bunny manages to get the incoherent Charley to the hospital. Danny and Kathy arrive. They figure out that Charley has taken 6 tranquilizers. Danny gives a monologue about boys, because Bunny had one. Joan Tompkins as Nurse.

=== Season 10 (1962–63) ===
No. overall	No. in season	Title	Directed by	Written by	Original release date
282	1	"The Baby Hates Charley"	Sheldon Leonard	Jack Elinson & Charles Stewart	October 1, 1962
Danny's working on a song and Kathy starts vacuuming. Then Rusty and Linda interrupt Danny. Charley and Bunny come by with baby Jonathan. Charley thinks the baby hates him, because every time he gets near it, Jonathan starts screaming. Danny tells Charley to just give it some time. Later, Charley is talking to the baby, who is in a stroller, while in the park. A crowd gathers around. A Policeman (Joe Devlin) and a man (Benny Rubin) both touch the baby and Jonathan laughs. Charley tries to pick the baby up and it starts screaming. Bunny and Jonathan are visiting with Kathy. Rusty comes in with a scary mask that he is using for a part in the school play. Bunny wants to see if the mask will scare the baby, but it just laughs. Linda gets a little bit of paint on the baby's face. Danny and Charley come by. When no one else is around, Charley goes to the baby. He picks it up because he thinks the baby has a rash. The baby is not screaming. Danny says that the baby could tell Charley was insecure before. Now the baby can tell Charley is secure. Song: Danny sings "Love In a Home".
283	2	"Danny's Replacement"	Sheldon Leonard	Charles Stewart & Jack Elinson	October 8, 1962
Agent Phil Brokaw (Sheldon Leonard) comes by to see Danny. Phil has booked a tour of Europe for Danny. Kathy is thrilled, but Danny's worried about what he will tell Charley. Phil says he will find a replacement for Danny. Danny suggests Jack Carter. Charley isn't sure Jack is right for the Copa. Jack comes by the Copa and is very excited about the job. Charley likes a lot of the suggestions that Jack is making. That night at the club, Danny tells the audience that he will be touring Europe for a while. Danny introduces his replacement, Jack. Danny is surprised when Jack starts doing a routine. The next day, Danny tells Phil that he's worried that Jack will take the job permanently. Phil reminds Danny that Jack was his idea. Charley tells Danny that Jack is redoing Danny's dressing room. Danny wants Phil to cancel the European tour. Danny calls the man in charge of the tour. Danny learns that the man has already hired Jack as a replacement for the tour. Things are worked out and Danny will still do the tour. Song: Jack sings "Showmanship".
284	3	"What Are Friends For?"	Sheldon Leonard	Jack Elinson & Charles Stewart	October 15, 1962
Danny's arm is very sore from the shot he got before going to Europe in a week. Kathy says that they cannot go because there's no one to watch the kids. Her Aunt Martha, who was supposed to watch them, just eloped. Kathy says she will stay home, but Danny will not go without her. After dismissing some other people, Danny decides to call an agency. Later, Bunny suggests to Charley that they watch Rusty and Linda. Charley agrees to the idea. But then Bunny wonders why Danny didn't ask them and they decide to not volunteer. Danny and Kathy are having no luck finding someone. Linda suggests that Bunny and Charley watch them. Danny is about to call them, when Kathy thinks they may be too busy with their baby. Some time goes by and both couples are getting upset that neither one has called. The two couples angrily confront each other. They then come to realize it was a misunderstanding and Danny and Kathy wanted Bunny and Charley all along. Song: Danny, Sid and Pat sing "Far Away Places".
285	4	"British Sense of Humor"	Sheldon Leonard	Arthur Stander	October 22, 1962
Danny, Kathy and Phil arrive in London. Danny worries that his act will not go over. He tells the Chauffeur (Julian Orchard) a joke and it doesn't get a laugh. Danny then tells the Hotel Manager (Anthony Dawes) a joke and he doesn't laugh either. When a joke doesn't work with the Chambermaid, Danny decides to seek old friend Sir Harry Barkley's (Cecil Parker) advice on British humor. Danny asks for a temporary membership in Harry's exclusive club. Harry's not sure he can, but will put it up to the Membership Committee. Danny goes to the Committee and meets Sir Howard (Dennis Price) and Sir Daniel (Richard Wattis). They ask about Danny's family history. There are several more awkward questions and they say they will let Danny know later that day. While sightseeing, Danny tells Kathy what a bunch of snobs the Committee was. Danny is determined to tell them off. After Danny does, Harry tells him his temporary membership had been denied. Instead he's given a plaque stating he has been made a lifetime member. Harry says the Committee asked him chose initial questions to prove they have a sense of humor. Later, Danny gets good reviews for his act.
286	5	"Jose Rents the Copa"	Greg Garrison	Jack Elinson & Charles Stewart	October 29, 1962
In London, Danny and Kathy are a little homesick, missing the kids and New York. Meanwhile, Charley is concerned about the Copa not bringing in enough money lately. Jose Jimenez (Bill Dana) offers to do some favors for Bunny. Jose would like to rent the Copa for an afternoon. Charley says it will cost $1000, but all Jose has is $62. Jose gets some of his friends to help. They pose as a Plumbing Inspector (Peter Leeds), Electrical Inspector (Stanley Adams) and a Termite Inspector (Allan Melvin). They make up a bunch of expensive problems in the club. When Charley learns that Jose knows the Inspectors, he asks Jose to talk to them and work something out. The men agree to overlook the problems if Charley lets Jose use the club for an afternoon. Charley later finds out the men are Jose's friends and he was tricked. Charley tells Bunny that Jose was probably going to charge his guests and keep the money. Maria, Jose's cousin, comes by Charley's house to thank him. Jose wanted the Copa for Maria's wedding reception. Knowing he misjudged Jose, Charley will let him have the club for Maria. Song: Danny sings "Autumn in New York".
287	6	"Rusty for President"	Greg Garrison	Charles Stewart & Jack Elinson	November 5, 1962
In England, Danny and Kathy have not heard from the kids in a week. Rusty calls and tells them about something that happened at school. Flashback to Rusty coming home all excited. He tells Bunny, Charley and Louise that he has been nominated to run for class president. The other boy who is running, Horace, is not very popular. The next day, Rusty comes home all depressed. Horace gave a great speech at school and Rusty did not. Charley suggests a campaign rally on Saturday at the Copa with the Smothers Brothers, who are performing there. At the rally, Dick Smothers and Tom Smothers are entertaining and it is going very well. They also really push for Rusty. On Monday, Rusty says that he seems to be leading and he thanks Bunny and Charley. Horace comes by to congratulate Rusty. He offers to help Rusty and makes some suggestions. After Horace leaves, Rusty realizes that Horace is better suited to be president. Rusty would like to hold a rally for Horace at the Copa. Back to the present, Danny and Kathy tell Rusty how proud they are of him. Songs: The Smothers Brothers sing "The Fox" and "Marching To Pretoria".
288	7	"A-Hunting We Will Go"	Sheldon Leonard	Harvey Bullock & Ray Allen Saffian	November 12, 1962
Kathy complains that all Danny does is read the paper. He is not taking advantage of being in London. She's tired of spending most of her time in the hotel room. Danny's engagement in London is over the next night. Kathy suggests renting a car and driving out into the country. While out driving, they stop at a quaint little pub. There they meet Jimmy Cartwright (Jimmy Edwards). Jimmy is apparently a jack of all trades. He invites Danny to go hunting with him. After Danny and Kathy leave, Lord Stratling (Raymond Huntley) confronts Jimmy. Stratling says that someone has been poaching birds off his land and implies Jimmy has something to do with it. Early the next morning, Jimmy comes to get Danny. Danny tries to make an excuse not to go, but Kathy makes him. Instead of guns, Jimmy gives Danny a net. After they catch several birds, Stratling and a Constable (Arnold Bell) arrive. The Constable takes Jimmy and Danny into custody. They are taken in front of a Judge. Jimmy makes up an elaborate story about why they were capturing the birds. The Judge is going to let Danny go and jail Jimmy. Danny finds a way to have Stratling drop the charges Harold Goodwin as Bellhop. Vanda Godsell as Mavis. Peter Butterworth as Publican.
289	8	"Ten Years Ago Today"	Danny Thomas	Jack Elinson & Charles Stewart	November 19, 1962
Rusty is complaining to Bunny and Charley about how hard his homework is. Charley gets a cablegram from Danny saying Happy Anniversary. Charley tells Rusty and Linda that 10 years ago he and Danny started working together at the Copa. Charley had put all his money into the club. He and Bunny were living in a small apartment. Flashback to then. Charley tells Bunny that he got agent Phil Brokaw to find someone for the Copa's opening. Charley is hoping for a big name star. Phil calls and says that he got a new client for the opening. At the Copa, Charley's assistant Felix (Paul Dubov) tells him the bills are piling up. The man that Phil sent over is Danny Williams. Charley is very apprehensive about Danny's act. Danny tells off Charley and starts to leave. Charley decides to give Danny a chance. It's opening night and there's a nice crowd. Danny's act is a hit. Phil Arnold as Copa Emcee. Song: Danny sings "When You're Smiling".
290	9	"Jose, the Scholar"	Coby Ruskin	Charles Stewart & Jack Elinson	November 26, 1962
While still in England, Danny and Kathy receive a letter from Jose Jimenez. He writes that he is going to night school. Jose tells Bunny and Louise some of the things he's learned in school. He has an American History test coming up. If he passes it, he will go to a higher class. Jose fantasizes that he is George Washington and he is addressing his troops. Bunny tells Jose some of his historical facts are wrong and he might have trouble with the test. Bunny, Linda and Rusty offer to help Jose study. Jose is getting frustrated that he is not learning as quickly as he would like. Bunny asks Charley to run the elevator so Jose can study more, but Charley refuses. Something that Jose says convinces Charley to do it. The day of the test, Jose tells everyone that he thinks he passed it. Miss Brown (Virginia Gregg), Jose's teacher, comes by. She tells Jose that he failed the test. Miss Brown feels Jose cheated. Jose is able to prove he didn't. Miss Brown apologizes and gives him a passing grade.
291	10	"The Ould Sod"	Sheldon Leonard	David Adler	December 3, 1962
Danny and Kathy arrive in Ireland. Danny is concerned about meeting some of Kathy's relatives. While driving, Kathy accidentally makes Danny drop his cigar in his lap. Danny drives erratically until he can stop. An old man reprimands them for their driving. Once the man learns who Kathy is, he introduces himself as her uncle, Francis Daly (Noel Purcell). Francis brings them to his home where they meet Aunt Mary and another uncle, Shamus Daly (J.G. Devlin). Then Aunt Molly (Barbara Mullen) arrives. They then argue about whose home Danny and Kathy will stay at. Danny says they will spend a night with each of them. While celebrating at a local pub, Danny is asked to sing a song. The crowd joins Danny in one song. Everyone is having a great time. Things turn sour when they learn that Danny is Lebanese. Kathy's father had written everyone that Danny was Irish. For the next couple days things are very uncomfortable for Danny. Danny finally tells the relatives off. The relatives now argue over who likes Danny more. Songs: Danny sings "When Irish Eyes Are Smiling" and "You're Irish and You're Beautiful".
292	11	"Tonoose, Life of the Party"	Al Rafkin	Jack Elinson & Charles Stewart	December 10, 1962
Back in London, Danny complains about how much money Kathy is spending. They get a letter from Rusty telling them about the teenage party Rusty threw. Flashback to Rusty planning the party. He's calling some friends to find some records to borrow. Charley brings some stuff for the party, but they are all old fashioned items. Charley and Bunny promise to stay out of the way during the party. Just then, Uncle Tonoose shows up. He wants to help with the party. Apparently Linda wrote him about it. Tonoose brought goat cheese with him for the party. He also brought some Lebanese records. Tonoose keeps kissing Rusty. Rusty tries to politely tell Tonoose that he doesn't need his help. Tonoose insists on helping. At the party, Tonoose tells some stories. Then he tries to get everyone to sing a Lebanese song. An embarrassed Rusty leaves the apartment. In the lobby, Bunny tries to make Rusty understand Tonoose's feelings. Charley uses a little psychology to get Rusty to go back to the party. When they get back, the kids are having a great time with Tonoose. Trudi Ames as Partygoer. Song: Angela sings "Old MacDonald Had a Farm".
293	12	"Danny's English Friend"	Danny Thomas	Harvey Bullock & Ray Allen Saffian	December 17, 1962
Danny and Kathy have been shopping in London. Danny wants to get something to eat. In a Pub, it's bumbling waiter Alfie Wingate's (Bernard Fox) last day before he goes to the States. His brother, Bert Wingate (Noel Drayton), asks him to try and not break anything and not turn any customers away. Danny and Kathy come in. Alfie recognizes Danny from a local performance. Alfie tells them he's going to New York. Danny gives him a card with Charley's name and the address of the Copa. Alfie misunderstands and thinks he's getting a job at the Copa. Later, Charley tells his assistant Felix that they're breaking in a new show that night and he wants nothing to go wrong. Alfie arrives and tells Charley that Danny said he can have a job as a waiter. That night Charley tells Felix that Columnist Sam Washburn (Roy Roberts) will be here soon. Things do not go well when Alfie shows Washburn and his group to a table. Mr. Foster (Benny Baker) tells Alfie that he has a reservation. Alfie had given Washburn what was Foster's table. More confusion ensues and the show is messed up. Certain he will get a bad review from Washburn, Charley fires Alfie. Washburn tells Charley that Alfie the comic really made the show and he will give it a great review. Charley goes to get Alfie. Shirley Mitchell as Betty Washburn. Joanne Rio as Restaurant Diner.
294	13	"Bunny, the Brownie Leader"	Al Rafkin	Jack Elinson & Charles Stewart	December 24, 1962
Danny is practicing his French. Kathy brings some voice records that the children recorded. They basically just ask for money. Back at home, Linda says that her girl scout brownie troop's leader has to move away. Linda is all excited when Bunny volunteers to be the leader. Bunny speaks with Miss Barclay (Joan Tompkins) about the position. Bunny is concerned that she is not that experienced, but Miss Barclay is not worried. Just then a Miss Fenwick (Margaret Hamilton) comes in to volunteer. Miss Fenwick is very experienced and Bunny offers to step down. After some arrogant comments from Miss Fenwick, Bunny tells Miss Barclay she would be happy to be a co-leader. Charley is talked into helping Bunny practice. Bunny is feeling insecure and is thinking about quitting. Charley and Louise make Bunny feel better. On a hike, the girls clearly have more fun with Bunny. At a meeting with Miss Barclay, Miss Fenwick tells Bunny that she is stepping down. Bunny insists that she stays teamed with Miss Fenwick. Song: Pat sings "She'll Be Coming 'Round the Mountain".
295	14	"Charley, the Artist"	Greg Garrison	Charles Stewart & Jack Elinson	December 31, 1962
While still in London, Danny has a day off and he wants to choose what he and Kathy are going to do. Kathy says that she got a letter from Bunny. Bunny was trying to find a way for Charley to relax more. Bunny says that she had Charley enroll in an art school. Flashback to Charley telling his cook, Fred (Charlie Cantor), that they need to start reducing expenses. Another headache is with one of Charley's acts. Noodles (Herbie Faye) insists that one of his chimps, Dinky, gets his own dressing room. Bunny comes by and tells Charley he needs a hobby to release the tension. She suggests the art class, but Charley is against it and they get into a fight. Back at home, Charley reluctantly agrees to take the class. Charley takes a few classes with Prof. Schmidt (Fritz Feld), but he thinks it's a waste of time. He thinks Schmidt is fraud and in it just for the money. Noodles comes by Charley's apartment with Dinky. Dinky paints on Charley's painting. Bunny brings Schmidt by and he loves the painting, not knowing that Dinky touched it up. Schmidt thinks that with Charley's talent, he should enroll in his class for five years. Charley brings out Dinky and calls Schmidt a phony.
296	15	"Lost French Boy"	Sheldon Leonard	Arthur Stander	January 7, 1963
Danny, Kathy and Phil arrive in France. Kathy wants to do some sightseeing. Phil warns them about people swindling tourists. A Street Peddler (Jacques Dynam) comes up to Danny and Kathy and tries to sell them a diamond ring he claims he found in the street. Danny sends him away. Several more people try sell them things with no luck. Danny and Kathy are having lunch at an outdoor cafe. A little French boy comes by and claims to be lost. Feeling sorry, they buy him lunch. They take the boy to a Police Officer. Things get confusing and the Officer will not take the boy. They take the boy to their hotel room. They try to find out the boy's name. Kathy only speaks a little French. After some ice cream, they learn his name is Pierre. To get more information, they have to keep giving Pierre things and taking him places. Later that day, they find out that Pierre can speak English. Phil thinks it is funny that Danny was taken by a little boy. Kathy says they had a great day with Pierre. Raymond Meunier as Street Peddler.
297	16	"Jose the Dog Sitter"	Coby Ruskin	Jack Elinson & Charles Stewart	January 14, 1963
Kathy and Danny are still in Paris. Kathy is writing letters to everyone at home. She mentions that Jose had written her that he was not fired for stealing. Danny wants her to tell him the whole story. Flashback to Jose coming to see Bunny. Jose would to like to practice asking for a raise with Charley. Jose goes to see the manager, Mr. Perkins (Frank Nelson). But instead of getting a raise, Jose has to look after Mrs. Montgomery's dog, Chumly, while she is away. Jose shows Bunny and Charley the dog. No one sees it when Chumly takes Bunny's bracelet off the table. Jose tries to talk Linda into taking care of Chumly. Chumly takes another one of Bunny's bracelets. Sgt. Fowler (Milton Frome) suspects Jose as there have been other thefts in the building when he's around. They find the jewelry in Jose's apartment and Fowler arrests him. Just then, Chumly comes in with another piece of jewelry. Feeling bad about the mix-up, Perkins gives Jose the raise.
298	17	"Tonoose Needs Glasses"	Coby Ruskin	Jack Elinson & Charles Stewart	January 21, 1963
While still in France, Danny gets a call from Uncle Tonoose. Danny tells Kathy that Tonoose is in New York for his annual check up. Meanwhile, Tonoose is telling Bunny, Charley, Louise, Linda and Rusty how strong he still is. Tonoose sees Dr. Edwards (Philip Ober) for his exam. Edwards tells Tonoose he's in good physical shape. But when Tonnose takes an eye exam, things don't go well. Edwards tells Tonnose that he needs glasses. Tonoose gets very upset. Bunny and Charley try to tell Tonoose that wearing glasses isn't a big deal. Rusty does a magic trick for Bunny and Charley. Bunny gets an idea. They use the tricks to make Tonoose think he's not seeing things and then he does see things. Bunny wonders if they over did it. Tonoose now feels old and weak. Bunny decides they need to tell Tonoose the truth. Tonoose realizes they tricked him because they care and he says he will get the glasses.
299	18	"Million Dollar Dress"	Sheldon Leonard	Robert Shannon	January 28, 1963
Danny and Kathy attend a fashion show by French designer Marie-Louise Carven while still in Paris. There is one dress that Kathy really loves. Danny agrees to buy it, but then he learns it costs over $1000. Kathy makes up excuses to not get it, even though she really wants it. Driver Marcel (Jacques Marin) tells Danny that he knows seamstress Jeanette Giroux (Pascale Roberts). Jeanette could make an exact copy of the dress that Kathy wants for $200. Danny doesn't feel comfortable tricking Kathy, but agrees to it. Later, Marcel arrives with the dress. Danny has seconds thoughts and tells him to take it away. Just then Kathy comes in. Though she loves the dress, she says she will return it to the store. Danny talks her into keeping it. Jeanette comes to see Kathy. She had forgotten one thing she needed to do on the dress. Kathy learns that the dress is a copy, how much it cost and she is very upset. To get even with Danny, she tells him she's returning it. Marcel tells Danny to go buy the original and exchange it for the copy. Kathy will then return the original and Danny will get his money back. Kathy wonders why Danny isn't stopping her from returning the copy. To not get Danny in trouble, she says she will keep the copy, not knowing it's the original. Marcel is able to switch the dresses and Kathy does wind up with the copy. Nadine Alari as Saleswoman.
300	19	"Rusty's Birthday"	Al Rafkin	Ed James & Seaman Jacobs	February 4, 1963
It's Rusty's 16th birthday. Bunny is sure that Danny and Kathy will have sent Rusty a present from Europe. Linda and Louise bring Rusty his presents. Rusty is wondering where his parents' present is. The Mailman (Benny Baker) comes by, but there's nothing for Rusty. Rusty thinks it may be at the Post Office, so he and Linda go there. Rusty talks to the Post Office Clerk (Frank Nelson), but he says there's nothing for Rusty. Back at home, Rusty down plays caring about birthdays. Bunny would like to cheer Rusty up and Linda suggests a birthday party. They have the party and Rusty is still depressed. Charley puts on a movie he got in the mail. It's Danny wishing Rusty a happy birthday. Danny then introduces Sammy Davis Jr., who does some impersonations of celebrities wishing Rusty a happy birthday. Danny tells Rusty there's a present for him in Kathy's dresser. Kathy joins Danny. Dabbs Greer as Impatient Postal Customer. Hazel Shermet as Woman in Line. George Rhodes as Himself. Songs: Amanda sings "(Won't You Come Home) Bill Bailey". Sammy sings "Happy Birthday to You". Pat sings "Put On a Happy Face".
301	20	"Charley the Tiger"	Coby Ruskin	Ray Singer & Dick Chevillat	February 11, 1963
Kathy and Danny get a letter from Charley. Charley writes that he hired a blonde dancer as a favor to Swifty Garland. The girl cannot dance. Charley has to let her go, but he does not know how to tell Swifty. Back at the Copa, Swifty strong arms Charley into keeping Flossie. At home, Bunny tells Charley that a childhood friend of his called. His name is William Miller and she invited him to dinner. Charley remembers him as Pee Wee Miller. Charley used to fight all his battles for him. William arrives and he is a very large and strong man. He goes by Big Moose Miller (Mike Mazurki) now. Bunny complains about how rude the new Janitor (Tiny Brauer) is. Miller confronts the Janitor and tells him to apologize to the Halpers. Miller then has Charley go to see the Janitor. Charley starts to get very confident when the Janitor will do whatever Charley wants. Linda complains about how rude tenant Mr. Horner (Ray Kellogg) is. Miller goes to see Horner. Horner comes by and apologizes to Charley. Charley decides to confront Swifty. Bunny learns that Moose was the one that intimidated the Janitor and Horner. Moose goes to the Copa to save Charley. A very confident Charley actually gets Swifty to back down and leave.
302	21	"The Roman Patriot"	Sheldon Leonard	Arthur Stander	February 18, 1963
Danny and Kathy arrive in Rome. In the hotel room, Danny just wants to lie down. Kathy wants to go to a cafe, but Danny wants to rest. She says she might go shopping in a jewelry store. Danny now wants to go with her to the cafe. A man walks by and tells Kathy she is beautiful in Italian. Kathy gets upset that Danny is not being more romantic. Danny goes back to the hotel. Later, Kathy comes to the hotel and tells Danny that a Francesco (Massimo Serato) offered to take her sightseeing. Danny thinks Francesco is a woman, but then handsome and charming man arrives. A jealous Danny decides to go with them. Francesco then offers to show Kathy Rome at night. A worn out Danny goes with. Danny gets upset when Francesco, and then several other men, dance with Kathy. Francesco tells Danny that he completed his mission, which was to get Danny to pay more attention to Kathy. Francesco now has to go home to his wife.
303	22	"Jose's Guided Tour"	Al Rafkin	Garry Marshall and Fred Freeman	February 25, 1963
Kathy mentions that it would be nice if Bunny and Charley could celebrate their anniversary here in Rome. She hopes the present they sent arrives in time. Back in New York, Jose delivers the package to Bunny. It's a painting of Venice. Rusty tells Jose that he and Linda put a deposit on a silver serving platter as a present. But they don't have the $10 to pay the rest and they need it by today. Jose suggests giving tours of Danny's apartment. Louise asks him how he will do it with the Halpers around. Jose convinces Bunny that Charley should take her out to celebrate the anniversary. Jose plays tour guide to a crowd of people. Jose then introduces Linda and Rusty. He gives the kids the money he collected so they can buy the platter. Bunny and Charley come home early and are surprised by the crowd. So he does not ruin Linda and Rusty's present, Jose cannot tell them why he gave the tour. Linda and Rusty come home with the present and explain how Jose helped them get the money. Bunny and Charley apologize to Jose. Jose mentions that his birthday is coming up. Jerry Hausner as Tourist with Camera. Olan Soule as Tourist.
304	23	"Bunny's Cousin"	Al Rafkin	Charles Stewart & Jack Elinson	March 4, 1963
While still in Rome, Kathy introduces Danny to Bunny's Aunt Laura. Aunt Laura is from Beaver Falls, Arkansas. Laura says that her niece Julianne (Jaye P. Morgan) is going to visit Bunny. Julianne is going to be a star in Charley's club. Kathy tells Danny that Charley hasn't met Julianne yet. Back in New York, Cousin Julianne surprises Bunny. Julianne says she's come to be a star. Bunny doesn't know how she is going to tell Charley. Charley comes home and complains about people wanting a relative to audition at the club. Bunny tells Charley that Julianne is their new baby nurse named Hilda. Julianne starts doing routines and impressions. Charley learns who she really is. Bunny finds a way to have Charley give Julianne an audition. Julianne sings for Charley and he is not impressed. Julianne starts to tell him off. Charley says she's hired because she was willing to fight for the job. Songs: Jaye sings "(Up A) Lazy River", "So In Love" and "There'll Be Some Changes Made".
305	24	"When in Rome"	Sheldon Leonard	Howard Leeds	March 11, 1963
In the hotel, Kathy tells Danny that they need to eat breakfast quickly. She reminds him that they are to shoot some publicity photos with Phil. Danny tries to speak Italian to the Hotel Waiter (Vito Scotti), but it doesn't go well. Later, Danny and Kathy tell Phil they are tired of taking pictures. Kathy wants to break for lunch. Phil doesn't think it's a good idea to eat in some little out of the way place. He wants to go back to the hotel. Danny and Kathy find a way to ditch Phil. They find a little place. The Waiter (Erminio Spalla) says they wouldn't like real Italian food. He says that the locals are embarrassed by wealthy Americans. Danny and Kathy get dressed up as poor locals and go back to the restaurant. Meanwhile, Phil is trying to find them. Phil gets to the place where they are, but doesn't recognize them. Danny gets worried when two men (Mino Doro and Guido Celano) see him pay the bill and see all his money. The men start to follow Danny and Kathy and eventually stop them. The men yell for the police. The men think that Danny stole the wallet he has. The Policeman takes Danny and Kathy into custody. Phil pranks Danny and Kathy by telling the Policeman that he is Danny Williams. Umberto Raho as Taxi Driver.
306	25	"Louise to the Rescue"	Coby Ruskin	Jack Elinson & Charles Stewart	March 25, 1963
Danny talks about how good the food is in Italy. Danny sees Charley's picture on the cover of Variety. It mentions that Nikki Stewart (Joyce Jameson) will be performing at the Copa. Danny figures Charley's very happy about that. At the club, Charley is not happy. Nikki is making a lot of demands. Despite not really being a club performer, Nikki will bring in a lot of people because she's a famous actress. Charley sees Nikki's act and there's really nothing to it. Back at home, Louise is having her Ladies Club Meeting. Charley comes home and tells Louise about the problems with Nikki. He says he can't get another act on that short of notice. Louise says that the Ladies Club girls are great singers. Nikki wants Charley to fire his orchestra and hire a new one. Charley has had enough and fires Nikki. Louise convinces Charley to use the Ladies Club girls. The ladies are a huge hit at the club. Clara Ward as Clara, Ladies Club Member. Songs: The Clara Ward Gospel Singers perform "Travelin' Shoes", "He's Got the Whole World in His Hands" and "When the Saints Go Marching In".
307	26	"Venetian Melody"	Sheldon Leonard	Harvey Bullock & Ray Allen Saffian	April 1, 1963
Danny and Kathy are now in Venice. Danny doesn't have to perform. He's hoping no one will know who he is and they can just vacation. The Bellhop recognizes Danny from a picture in the paper. Danny pays him to not say anything. Outside there's a man singing on a gondola. A little girl named Maria Bonifacio (Piccola Pupa) comes to the door. She says that the singing man is her father and she's his agent. Danny reluctantly goes on a gondola ride. Maria wants Danny to put up $10,000 to take her father to America to sing. Danny says he cannot help her and sends her away. The next day Danny and Kathy see a little boy playing the accordion very well. Maria shows up and it turns out the boy is her little brother. Danny again has to tell her no. At a club that night a man named Luigi asks Kathy to dance. Maria shows up and Luigi is her dancing uncle. Danny learns that Maria's dream has been to go to America. Maria sings for Danny. She is very good and Danny assures her that his agent Phil will get her to America. Songs: Tony Brandt sings "Danny Boy". Piccola Pupa sings "Quando quando quando".
308	27	"Charley My Boy"	Jay Sandrich	Charles Stewart & Jack Elinson	April 8, 1963
Kathy gets a letter from Bunny. Apparently Charley did something to make Bunny jealous and it involves another woman. Danny finds it hard to believe. Flashback to Bunny taking a "Rate Your Mate" quiz. Bunny tells Charley he didn't rate well. Bunny tries to make Charley feel better. At the club, beautiful singer Diana Lawrence (Ruta Lee) comes by to see Charley. Charley says that he told her agent he's not doing auditions until next week. Diana flatters and flirts with Charley. Charley agrees to audition her the next day. At home, Rusty wants to call Danny because he set up two dates for the same night and he doesn't know what to do. A very confident Charley gives him some advice about romance. Charley tells Bunny about all the compliments that Diana gave him and Bunny thinks it's funny. The next day, Diana auditions and Charley thinks she's great. Just then Bunny shows up and things get awkward for Diana. Bunny claims to not be jealous. At home Bunny tells Charley she had Phil book Diana at a different club. Bunny was jealous and is now mad. Bunny and Charley come to an understanding. Song: Ruta sings "You Do Something to Me".
309	28	"Linda, the Grownup"	Jay Sandrich	Ed James & Seaman Jacobs	April 15, 1963
Danny and Kathy are back in Rome. They get another letter from Bunny and Charley. This time it's about Linda. Flashback to Linda asking Bunny if she can change the baby. Bunny tells her she's too young. Linda asks Louise if she can help in the kitchen. Linda makes a mess and Louise says it was because she's a little girl. Linda's friend Nancy comes over. Linda puts on lipstick and tries to act older. Bunny tells Charley that Linda's going through a faze. Charley suggests letting her be a grown up for a while and she will want to be a kid again. They will give Linda a bunch of grown up chores to do. Linda is very busy, but keeps going. Linda makes the dinner. Dinner does not go well, but the family has to pretend to enjoy it. Bunny didn't think Linda would last this long. Linda does quit wanting to be a grown up. Song: Danny sings "Thank Heaven for Little Girls".
310	29	"Homecoming"	Danny Thomas	Charles Stewart & Jack Elinson	April 22, 1963
Danny and Kathy are taking an ocean liner back to the States. On deck, Kathy is talking to Mrs. Cory (Alice Reinheart). Danny comes by and he's sea sick. Back at home, Bunny and Charley are getting ready to pick Danny and Kathy up. Charley is worried that Rusty and Linda are going to forget about them. Bunny reminds Charley that they are moving two floors below. The kids say they will never forget them. Just then, Danny and Kathy show up. The boat docked early. Danny and Kathy don't say a thing to Bunny and Charley as they are too busy greeting the kids. Bunny and Charley leave. Later, Bunny and Charley come by. Danny suggests going on a holiday together. Danny asks Charley if he can postpone his opening at the club for a week. Charley thought that Danny meant he and Bunny were included, but Danny just meant the family. Bunny tells Charley that Danny and Kathy haven't seen the kids for a long time and they just need to be together. Bunny invites them over for dinner but Kathy says some other night. Danny, Kathy and the kids come by with a surprise dinner and to thank Bunny and Charley. Songs: Danny sings "Home (When Shadows Fall)". Danny, Marjorie, Rusty, Angela, Sid and Pat sing "Consider Yourself".
311	30	"Tonoose's Brother"	Danny Thomas	Jack Elinson & Charles Stewart	April 29, 1963
Tonoose makes a surprise visit. Tonoose still thinks Kathy is too thin. He asks Danny how his stop in Lebanon was and how is the family there. Danny saw Tonoose's big brother, Tufik. Tonoose thinks Danny is in a rut because he still performs at the Copa. He wants Danny to star in a play that a cousin wrote. It's called The Goat Herder and The Lady. Tonoose wants Danny to put up the money for the play. Later, Kathy and Louise are upset because Tonoose has taken over the kitchen. Tonoose insists that Rusty become a lawyer instead of a doctor. Danny tells Kathy that he cannot tell Tonoose off because he is the leader of the family. Kathy suggests getting an actor to play Tufik because Tonoose would have to listen to his older brother. When Danny learns that Tonoose thinks Linda should get married, he decides to play Tufik. Because he has not seen Tufik in 50 years, Tonoose believes Danny with a fake mustache and hair is Tufik. Danny gets Tonoose to forget about all the family suggestions he made. Tonoose does figure out it's really Danny.
312	31	"Jose's Rival"	Danny Thomas	Jack Elinson & Charles Stewart	May 6, 1963
Jose comes by to thank Danny for inviting him to the Copa. It was the happiest birthday he ever had. Jose really liked the girl tap dancer. Even though it's the first time he saw her, he loves her. Jose would like Danny to introduce him to her. The next day, Danny has Jose meet Susie Harper. Jose is very shy and nervous. Just then Tom Bradley (Bill Bixby) comes by. Tom is an old friend of Susie's and he's from her home town. Tom is a pianist and he's looking for a job. Danny tells Kathy that Tom is obviously using Susie to get to him. Danny and Kathy try to give Jose some advice on how to win Susie. Danny thinks he has a way to get rid of Tom. Danny tells Tom that he will recommend him to his agent. Danny has Tom play him something and he's actually very good. Tom tells Susie that he will be busy now and they should stop dating. Tom tells Danny that he wants to ask Susie to marry him. Jose says he will never fall in love again, but then he sees Betty.
313	32	"That Old Feeling"	Danny Thomas	Jack Elinson & Charles Stewart	May 13, 1963
Danny wants to do a parody of some Harry Ruby songs in the act. Charley will not pay for the rights. Danny thinks he knows how to negotiate with Harry. Harry drops by Danny's place. Harry says they can use the songs for free. Danny wants to know what Harry's angle is. Harry just feels bad for overcharging him in the past. Kathy comes home and says there's an article in the paper about Harry. Harry may have a movie done about his life. Danny figures out the publicity Harry would get if Danny did the songs. Harry admits he needs Danny's help. Harry learns that Frank Sinatra will be playing him in the movie. He has to take back the songs from Danny. Later, Harry comes by the house to apologize and says Danny can still use the songs. It turns out the movie deal fell through. Song: Danny sings "Who's Sorry Now?".

=== Season 11 (1963–64) ===
No. overall	No. in season	Title	Directed by	Written by	Original release date
314	1	"The Country Squires"	Danny Thomas	Jack Elinson & Charles Stewart	September 30, 1963
While taking the kids for a drive in the country, Bunny and Kathy see a little old farm house that they really like. Without telling their husbands, they buy it. Kathy thinks they should show Charley and Danny the house and hope they will like it as well. Danny and Charley are playing cards and Kathy hints about going out to the country. Rusty and Linda drop hints as well. Danny says they will go to a golf course. Kathy finally convinces them to take a drive. They get to the house and it's quite dilapidated. Kathy and Bunny try to show the possibilities. Kathy suggests buying the place. The men want to leave. Kathy starts crying and confesses that they already own the place. It will be paid off in 20 years. Danny and Charley go to see Elmer Moody, the real estate agent. Danny says they want their money back and Elmer agrees. Danny is suspicious that Elmer didn't put up a fuss. He starts to think that the land will be bought for some large construction. Danny and Charley decide to keep the property. Back at home, Danny learns that nothing is going to be built there.
315	2	"The Perfect Crime"	Danny Thomas	Ray Allen Saffian & Harvey Bullock	October 7, 1963
Danny complains when Kathy wants some money to go shopping. Later, while looking for a handkerchief, Danny finds a large some of money. Danny tells Charley that he's going to teach Kathy a lesson. He's going to buy a set of golf clubs with her money. Danny and Charley come home and Kathy has a Policeman (Ray Kellogg) there. She tells Danny they were robbed. The $200 she had saved to buy Danny a birthday present is gone. She was going to buy him some golf clubs. Danny tells the Policeman that he's sure the money is in the house. Charley tells Danny to put the money in her drawer while she's sleeping. Kathy catches him doing it and thinks he's putting in his own money. She will not take Danny's money and she still wants to catch the crook. At the club, Charley asks Frank (Guy Marks), a bartender he just hired, why there's alcohol and other things missing. Frank says he borrowed the stuff to help a friend. Charley wants the stuff back. Danny comes by just as Charley fires Frank. Danny makes a deal with Frank to have him put Kathy's money back. That night Danny and Kathy come home. They find Frank tied up and Louise did it. Frank makes up a story to explain to Kathy that he took the money. His conscience wouldn't let him keep it. Kathy feels sorry for him and tells him to keep all the money.
316	3	"Here's the $50 Back"	Danny Thomas	Jack Elinson & Charles Stewart	October 14, 1963
Danny is happy because he has some time off. The family wants to go on a vacation, but Danny just wants to rest around the house. Harvey Bullock (Pat Buttram) comes to the door. Danny doesn't really remember him. Harvey reminds him that he was in an act with a trained seal named Gertrude. Danny asks Harvey what brings him to town. Danny misunderstands and thinks Harvey wants to borrow money. Harvey is actually there to pay Danny back the $50 he lent him years ago. Harvey is now in pest control in Arkansas. Danny and Kathy invite him to stay in their guest room. Rusty and Linda really get along with Harvey. Danny still can't remember him. They spend several days showing Harvey the town with Danny picking up the tab. Danny is talking to his Barber (Herb Vigran) about Harvey. The Barber mentions the same thing happened to Milton Berle. A guy came by to pay back a $50 loan Milt gave him. Danny realizes it's Harvey and Danny's been taken. Danny confronts Harvey about Milton Berle. Harvey has such a moving explanation that Danny lends him $50 and tells him to visit again. Songs: Danny sings "Blue Skies". Pat sings "There Was A Man From Arkansas".
317	4	"The Woman Behind the Jokes"	Danny Thomas	Fred S. Fox & Iz Elinson	October 21, 1963
Kathy and Bunny are at one of Danny's acts at the club. All night Danny makes Kathy the butt of his jokes and she gets upset. The next morning Louise finds Danny sleeping on the couch. Kathy is still mad. Danny tries to tell her she should not take the jokes personally. Danny gets a call from Howard Blake (Dick Whittinghill), who does interviews on TV. Danny thinks that Howard wants to interview him, but Howard wants to talk to Kathy. Howard wants her on his show because of the jokes made about her. Danny can't talk Kathy out of going on the show. Charley tells Danny he should bribed Kathy. Danny says he tried it and it didn't work. Kathy enlists Buddy Sorrell (Morey Amsterdam, crossing over from The Dick Van Dyke Show) to write jokes about Danny. Danny finds out about Buddy. He reminds Buddy that he writes for him. Kathy is still going to use the material. Charley and Danny watch Howard's show. Kathy keeps trying to tell the jokes about Danny, but Howard keeps interrupting her with compliments. Kathy winds up telling silly stories about herself.
318	5	"Rusty Drives A Car"	Danny Thomas	Written by : Sheldon Keller & Howard Keller; Flashback Material by : Alan Lipscott, Bob Fisher, Arthur Stander, Charles Stewart and Jack Elinson	October 28, 1963
Danny is all worried and concerned because Rusty is taking his driving test today. Kathy reminds him that Rusty's been taking driver's training in school for the last 6 months. Rusty tells Danny that the state says he's old enough. Kathy tells Danny that he's just having a hard time excepting that Rusty is growing up. Danny flashes back to when Rusty was very little and Danny thought he stole a dollar. Kathy recalls when Rusty was 9 years old and was looking for a job in the paper. Danny flashes back to when Rusty had a hard time selling raffle tickets. Kathy makes Danny promise that he will help Rusty. Danny talks to Charley about Rusty driving. Charley says he will not let his boy drive. Danny thinks he has a way to stop Rusty from taking the test. Danny will put his car out of commission. Danny and Charley don't know anything about cars, but they start taking parts out of the engine. The two find out from Rusty that the car is not Danny's. The owner comes by. Somehow the car starts and he drives off. Danny has no choice but to take Rusty to the test and he passes. Note: This episode includes flashbacks from "Last Dollar", "The Raffle Tickets" and "Rusty, the Man".
319	6	"Linda and the New Dress"	Danny Thomas	Iz Elinson & Fred S. Fox	November 4, 1963
Kathy gets a call from Mrs. Metcalf. Kathy tells Danny that Linda got into a fight with her best friend Helen Metcalf (Andrea Darvi). Linda knocked Helen into the mud and tore her dress. Linda told Helen to go buy a new dress and charge it to Danny. Charley comes by and Danny tells him what Linda did. Linda comes home and admits to it. Kathy knows she needs to be punished, but can't decide what to do. Kathy blames Danny and says he doesn't spend enough time with Linda. To make up for that, Danny buys her things. That's why she doesn't know the value of money. Danny fantasizes that Linda claims to Psychiatrist Danny that she is the last of the big time spenders. When Psychiatrist asks her about her father, she screams. She says that her father spoiled her until he had no more money. To get money, she turned to a life crime. She will be executed for selling government secrets. Back to reality, Kathy admits that she spoiled Linda as well. Danny punishes Linda by grounding her for three weeks. Helen comes by in the new dress. Danny and Kathy find out the real reason that Linda made sure Helen had the new dress. Helen's parents couldn't afford to give her one. Song: Danny sings: "Thank Heaven for Little Girls".
320	7	"My Fair Uncle"	Danny Thomas	Fred S. Fox & Iz Elinson	November 11, 1963
Uncle Tonoose (Hans Conried) arrives for a visit. Tonoose announces that he's going to be married. He then brings in Matilda (Florence Halop) and introduces her to the family. Matilda calls Tonoose Anthony and says they have know each other for two weeks. After Tonoose and Matilda see some of New York, Kathy suggests going to their place in the country. Tonoose is excited, but Matilda isn't sure about it because of her condition. Tonoose says he will not go. Danny tells Kathy that he doesn't like the way Matilda manipulated Tonoose. Tonoose, the family and Louise are practicing dancing for the wedding. Tonoose mentions to Matilda how many days long the wedding will be. It will be in Toledo with many family members. Matilda was thinking of a small wedding in Chicago. Matilda brings up her condition again. She says that she will have to forget the memories of her first marriage in Toledo. Tonoose agrees to the wedding in Chicago. Danny comes up with a plan. He talks Matilda into asking Tonoose to shave off his mustache to make him look younger. They get into an argument and break up. Matilda comes back and agrees to let Tonoose be the boss.
321	8	"Shy Alfie"	Danny Thomas	Harvey Bullock & Ray Allen Saffian	November 18, 1963
English waiter Alfie Wingate (Bernard Fox) is visiting with Danny and the family. The kids invite him to dinner. Kathy says that maybe Alfie has a date. Danny mentions how shy Alfie is. Alfie claims to have a date with a woman, but Danny catches him in a lie. After Alfie leaves, Danny tells Kathy that they need to find a date for him. At Charley's office, Diana Masters (Olive Sturgess) comes by looking for any kind of job. Charley doesn't have any openings. Danny makes Diana an offer. If she could help get Alfie over his shyness, he will make sure Charley finds a job for her. That night Diana is at Danny's place. Alfie comes by in a fun mood. But then he panics when he sees Diana. Things are awkward at first, but then Diana mentions that she had visited England. The next day at the club, George (Bernie Kopell) tells Alfie how lucky he is to be single. All Alfie can think about is Diana. Alfie overhears Danny and Charley talking about the deal they made with Diana. Alfie is very sad because he knows he was fooled. Diana asks Alfie to go out and he turns her down. Alfie tells Charley he is quitting. Alfie is happy when he learns Diana really is interested in him. Songs: Bernard sings "Knees Up Mother Brown" and "I've Got a Lovely Bunch of Coconuts".
322	9	"Oh, the Clancys"	Danny Thomas	Jack Elinson & Charles Stewart	December 2, 1963
Kathy is surprised when her Aunt Molly (Barbara Mullen), from Ireland, comes to the door. Kathy and Danny insist that she stay with them. Then Molly's four adult sons (The Clancy Brothers) arrive. Danny learns that the guys are singers and want to perform at the Copa. Danny says that it's not his decision to make, it's Charley's. When Danny offers them some money, Molly is insulted and says they're leaving. Kathy tells them they are staying. At the club, Charley is not interested in having the guys sing there. Danny suggests that to keep them out of the club, Charley should hire a policeman. Officer Brennan (Larry J. Blake) doesn't let the guys in. When they talk to him, they find out he's Irish as well. Brennan says he can't let them in the main room, but they can sing in a side room. They start performing and Danny's entire audience goes to listen to them. Even Charley is enjoying them. Later, Charley tells the guys that they can perform in the main room. Molly says that the guys each have different careers they want to pursue. Song: The Clancy Brothers sing "Brennan On The Moor".
323	10	"The Hex"	Danny Thomas	Jack Elinson & Charles Stewart	December 9, 1963
Danny and Charley bring a stuffed deer head and rhino head to the country home. Kathy and Bunny are not happy about it. Kathy mentions that it doesn't look as though carpenter Mr. Baker (Charles Lane) has done much since the last time they were there. They find Baker sleeping outside. Baker comes up with excuses as to why he hasn't finished the job. Danny gives him one more week. When Baker says it can't be done in that time, Danny fires him. Kathy and Bunny remind Danny how hard it is to find a carpenter. The girls think it's funny when Danny says that he and Charley can finish the job. Baker puts a hex on Danny and Charley and they just laugh. While making the repairs, things start going wrong for Danny and Charley. Charley wonders if they really are hexed. According to a book he read, to chase away evil spirits, Charley says they need to wear strings of garlic around their necks. Bunny and Kathy come by with Mr. Frink (Jess Kirkpatrick), the new carpenter. The girls laugh when the guys say they have been hexed. Kathy says that things are falling apart because the guys don't know what they're doing. She says they want to believe in the hex to cover up for their mistakes. The guys realize she's right.
324	11	"The Two Musketeers"	Danny Thomas	R.S. Allen & Harvey Bullock	December 16, 1963
Bert (Ross Martin), a Copa Club Musician, owes $100 to Big Joe (Henry Kulky), which he doesn't have. He tries to borrow it from Danny, but Danny's bailed him out before and says no. Alfie comes by and tells Danny he still hasn't found a place to live. Bert offers to let Alfie stay at his place, obviously hoping to get money from him. Bert asks landlord Gertie (Barbara Stuart) to help him clean his place before Alfie shows up. It takes some dickering, but Bert manages to gets some money from Alfie. Gertie can't believe that Bert promised Alfie three meals a day. Bert tries to trick Alfie into thinking he's eaten already. Bert then tricks Alfie into thinking he has a disease and he needs to go on a diet. Alfie calls Dr. Maxwell (Steven Geray). Bert gets Maxwell to believe that Alfie is an alcoholic. Big Joe comes to collect his money. Bert says he needs a half an hour longer. Alfie thinks he's dying and wants to go back to England. Bert confesses to Alfie that he lied to him. Alfie's not mad and gives Bert his watch to give to Big Joe. Bert has second thoughts and gives Alfie the watch back. Danny pays Big Joe off.
325	12	"Christmas Story"	Danny Thomas	Harvey Bullock & R.S. Allen	December 23, 1963
Danny is cheerful because it is the Christmas season. Kathy is not as excited because she is nowhere near finished wrapping presents and writing Christmas cards. Linda is upset because she doesn't know what present to get Mary Jane. She does not want to spend more than Mary Jane will, but she does not know what Mary Jane is spending. Rusty wants a new stereo set. Danny and Kathy each thought the other was getting the tree. At the club, Alfie tells Danny that he has a side job playing Santa at a department store. Alfie says how much fun he has with the children. Danny works his family's attitude about Christmas into his act. Because he has been slacking at work, Charley wants to fire Alfie. Alfie gives Charley and Danny each a present. Alfie says he took the extra job so he could buy presents for his friends. Charley changes his mind. Danny enlists Alfie's help in bringing the Christmas spirit to his family. Danny brings home a tiny scrawny tree. While the family is at dinner at the Halpers, Alfie will bring a tree from the department store. When the family comes home there is a large beautifully decorated tree there. Later, Alfie comes by and tells Danny and Kathy he could not get the tree from the department store. Songs: Danny sings "The Christmas Song" and "Christmas Story".
326	13	"Peaceful Co-Existence"	Danny Thomas	Sheldon Keller & Howard Merrill	December 30, 1963
The Williams/Halper Connecticut country home is finally completely renovated. The two couples spend a weekend in the country together. Danny gets upset when Charley and Bunny take the bedroom he wanted. Kathy and Bunny have a difference of opinion on how to wash the dishes. Danny and Charley start to get on each others nerves while trying to relax outside. Danny gets upset with how long Charley is in the bathroom. It turns out Charley was not in there, no one was. The door was just stuck. Danny and Kathy are trying to sleep and Charley and Bunny start singing in the other room. The next morning Danny tells Kathy that he's going to have it out with Charley. He's going to suggest that they go to the cabin on alternate weekends. Before he can say anything, Charley makes the alternate weekends suggestion. Charley and Bunny name several things that Danny and Kathy do that are annoying. Danny and Kathy then list their grievances. The couples apologize to each other. They promise to get things out in the open from now on. Songs: Danny, Sid and Pat sing "Side by Side". Sid and Pat sing "In The Evening By The Moonlight".
327	14	"The Bowling Partners"	Danny Thomas	Jerry Belson & Garry Marshall	January 6, 1964
Danny comes home with a model airplane kit. He tells Rusty that it's been a long time since they did something together. Rusty says he's too old for that. Kathy comes home and Rusty is excited about the record she bought him. Danny feels he's lost contact with Rusty, but Kathy thinks he's making too much out of it. Danny tries talking to Rusty, but Rusty wants to go see his friends. Rusty is at the bowling alley with Jimmy and Dale (Michael Winkelman). They talk about their fathers. Mr. Herkey (Allen Jenkins) tells them about the father-and-son bowling tournament this Friday. He gives them each an entry blank. Rusty mentions how bad of a bowler Danny is. Later, Kathy finds the entry blank to the tournament. Danny thinks Rusty wants to bowl with him. Danny buys bowling balls and shoes. The tournament is that evening and Rusty hasn't said anything yet. Rusty comes home and Danny drops hints about bowling. Kathy finally asks Rusty if he's going bowling and Rusty says he can't as there a tournament at the alley. Rusty finds out that Danny wanted to go to the tournament. Rusty asks Danny to go bowling and makes up an excuse why he didn't ask earlier. They win a trophy for being the worst team in the tournament.
328	15	"Linda's Crush"	Danny Thomas	Garry Marshall & Jerry Belson	January 13, 1964
Louise and Kathy are working on Linda's dress that she will wear to the 6th grade dance tomorrow night. Danny is going on a TV show and Kathy and Louise don't say anything about the way he's dressed. Linda mentions that she's never met Wendell Henderson, but she thinks he likes her. Danny is on the Herb Lewis show and he says that his daughter Linda is growing up fast. She has a crush on a new boy every week. Danny makes some jokes about Wendell. When Danny gets home, Linda is furious that Danny made jokes about her liking Wendell. The next day when Linda comes home from school, she tells Kathy that all the kids teased her about Wendell. Danny tries to talk to her. Linda says she moving to Africa. She says she cannot go to the dance and Wendell will never talk to her. Danny tries to apologize. Wendell comes by and tells Kathy that he heard on TV that Linda likes him. Kathy asks if he's mad that Danny talked about him and he says not at all. Wendell shyly asks Linda to the dance. Danny comes home. Thinking that Wendell didn't stick up for Linda at school, he kicks him out. Linda is furious when she finds out what Danny did. Danny works things out and Linda goes to the dance. She comes home saying she likes Robert Brenner now.
329	16	"Kathy, the Secretary"	Danny Thomas	Charles Stewart & Jack Elinson	January 20, 1964
Danny learns that his checking account is overdrawn. Danny complains to Kathy about her overspending. Phil Brokaw (Sheldon Leonard) comes by. He shows Kathy the earrings he bought for a woman he met yesterday. Danny gives Phil a hard time about spending money. Kathy suggests that she could get a job. Phil gets conned into giving her a temporary job as his secretary. It's Kathy's first day and she already has caused problems for Phil. Danny tells Louise that the children are miserable that Kathy is not there. The kids are actually completely fine. Phil comes by and tells Danny that if he's upset about Kathy working, he could get someone else. Though he doesn't mean it, Danny says that she can keep the job. Phil then makes up a story about all the handsome young actors that come to his office. Back at the office, Kathy tells Phil she cancelled the date he had for that evening because the woman is too young for him. Danny learns from Phil's other secretary Margo that Kathy is not doing well. Danny figures out Phil's scheme. Phil finally admits to Danny that Kathy has got to go. The way Phil lets Kathy go backfires on him a little bit.
330	17	"The Quiz Show"	Danny Thomas	Jerry Belson & Garry Marshall	January 27, 1964
While waiting for Danny to come home, bartender Frank Myers does some impressions for Rusty and Linda. Frank tells Danny that he is going on the quiz show Celebrity Partners. He would like Danny to be his partner. Danny says he's turned down that show many times. Danny doesn't trust Frank's motives. Frank says that his mother needs a new washing machine and that is one of the prizes. Danny agrees to go on the show. On the show, they do win the washing machine. The Quizmaster warns them that if they continue, they risk losing any prizes they have already won. Frank wants to continue and they wind up losing. The next morning Linda suggests that Danny buy Frank a washing machine. Louise and the family say they will chip in some money. Danny doesn't believe that Frank has a mother. Danny and Kathy bring a washing machine to Frank's place. Danny is surprised when they meet Mrs. Myers (Lurene Tuttle). Danny and Kathy learn that Frank has won many other items on quiz shows that he and his mother then sell. Song: Guy Marks sings "My Mother's Eyes".
331	18	"Howdy, Neighbors"	Danny Thomas	Iz Elinson & Fred S. Fox	February 3, 1964
Danny, Charley, Kathy and Bunny are staying at their Connecticut country home. Kathy realizes they forgot to buy salt while in town. Danny says he will borrow some from the neighbors, but then he realizes they have never met them. He thinks the neighbors may be avoiding them because they are city folk. He suggests they go out in the front yard and wait for someone to walk by. Bunny and Kathy are outside painting the fence. Fred Simpson (Willis Bouchey) walks by and the ladies try talking to him with a country accent. He says hi and leaves. Danny and Charley come by dressed like country bumpkins. Mrs. Simpson (Hope Summers) walks by and the guys introduce themselves. The conversation doesn't go well and she leaves. Danny decides to try some country humor. William Moore (Dave Willock) comes by and Danny tells a joke. William leaves quickly. Danny thinks they should have an old fashioned country party. They send out the invitations, but no one shows up. The fire place starts sending out smoke and the neighbors come by thinking there's a fire. They say the reason they didn't come to the party was because they didn't appreciate being treated like country bumpkins. The misunderstanding is cleared up and the party goes on. Molly Dodd as Alice Moore. Song: Danny sings "It's So Nice To Be Nice To Your Neighbor".
332	19	"The Antique Dealers"	Danny Thomas	Ed James & Seaman Jacobs	February 10, 1964
Kathy and Bunny have put up an antique cuckoo clock near the front door of their Connecticut country home. The girls are upset when Danny and Charley don't notice it. The guys find out the girls spent $100 on the clock. The girls are embarrassed when they learn the clock is not really an antique. They cannot return it as they bought it from an old lady on the side of the road. Danny intends to get their money back by trying to pass off junk as valuable antiques. Danny and Charley set up a roadside stand. Fred (Olan Soule) and his wife (Peggy Converse) are about to buy a chair, but Charley ruins the sale. Mr. Ludlow (Frank Ferguson) looks around the stand. He buys everything for $100, with a $50 deposit. Kathy feels bad and wants Danny to give Mr. Ludlow his money back, but Danny will not do it. Kathy and Danny find Linda selling some of her junk in a little stand. Linda says that what she's doing if fair because Danny did it. What Danny doesn't know is that Kathy set the whole thing up to make Danny come to his senses. Danny tries to give Ludlow his money back, but Ludlow keeps raising his offer. It turns out that Ludlow is an antique dealer and gives Danny a check for $1000. There is silver bowl that was made by Paul Revere.
333	20	"Bunny Gets Into the Act"	Danny Thomas	Charles Stewart & Jack Elinson	February 17, 1964
Louise comes into the house to find Charley sleeping on the couch. Kathy is not happy with Charley and Danny. Louise wants to know what happened. Kathy flashes back a couple of days. Bunny would like to try out for Charley's new revue at the Copa. At the club, Danny and Charley are auditioning a woman dancer. Bunny comes by and says she wants to audition. She used to be a performer and she misses it. Bunny does a song and Charley tells her he will let her know. Danny reminds Charley that there was a time when Kathy wanted to get into show business. Danny found a way to change her mind and they could do the same with Bunny. They give Bunny a part in a country sketch. Bunny is a stand-in for the character Mary Sunshine (Jackie Joseph). Bunny is the brunt of many slapstick gags and winds up leaving. Back at home, Bunny and Kathy hear Danny and Charley talking about how their plan worked. Back to the present, Kathy tells Louise that's why Charley slept on the couch. Bunny comes by and Charley explains why he did what he did. The two make up. Jane Kean as Cactus Kate. Peter Leeds as Rex Romance. Songs: Pat sings "Greenland Is The Place For Me". Danny sings "Back in Your Own Backyard".
334	21	"Sense of Humor"	Danny Thomas	Sheldon Keller & Howard Merrill	February 24, 1964
During his act at the club, Danny is making fun of Swenson the Janitor (John Qualen), from his building. Back at home, Danny tells Kathy that his new material is going over well. Kathy says that the thermostat is broken and she sent for Swenson. Danny wants to invite Swenson and his wife to the club. Swenson arrives and makes a sarcastic remark about his job. He obviously heard about Danny's act and is not happy. He will fix the thermostat when Danny stops using him in the act. After something else that Swenson says, Danny agrees. Now in his act, Danny makes fun of Schultz the Butcher (Tiny Brauer). The next morning, Danny gets an ultimatum from Schultz. Danny then uses Wong Chow the Launderer (Philip Ahn) in his act. The next day, Danny gets his shirts back from the laundry starched stiff. Kathy wants Danny to stop offending people. Charley complains about Danny changing his act and it isn't going over. Danny explains why he did the change, but Charley doesn't care. Danny invites Swenson, Wong, and Schultz to the club. During the act Danny makes fun of psychiatrists and doctors. Danny then introduces his actual doctor, Dr. Leventhal, who loved the jokes. Swenson, Wong, and Schultz realize it's OK to laugh at one's self. Song: Danny sings "Let a Smile Be Your Umbrella".
335	22	"Tonoose Gets a Job"	Danny Thomas	Charles Stewart & Jack Elinson	March 2, 1964
Uncle Tonoose arrives for a visit. Tonoose tells Danny that he had a fight with cousin Habib. Habib called Tonoose old. Habib says he's young and he got a job in the big city selling ladies underwear. To prove he's the leader of the family, Tonoose wants to get a job in New York. Kathy thinks Danny should help him find a job, but Danny says no. Tonnose speaks with Miss Burch (Shirley Mitchell) at an employment agency. When Miss Burch learns that Tonoose is over 70 years old, she doesn't think she can find him a job. Tonoose tells Kathy that he went to several places and they all said he was too old. Tonoose is very depressed. Kathy tells Danny that Jerry MacFarland owes him a favor. Maybe Jerry could give him a job in one of his shoe stores. The Shoe Clerk (Bob Jellison) is not happy about Tonoose working in the stock room. While the Clerk was in the back, Tonoose waits on a woman customer. Things do not go well and the woman gets into an argument with another woman customer. Danny tells Kathy what happened and thinks that Tonoose needs to go back to Toledo. Kathy uses some reverse psychology to get Tonoose to want to go home.
336	23	"The Leprechaun"	Danny Thomas	Ed James & Seaman Jacobs	March 9, 1964
Linda is in the park. She sees a man standing by a tree and he's talking to something. He tells her he's talking to a squirrel. He says he's a leprechaun. Linda comes home and tells Kathy she invited a friend over for lunch. She brings in the man she met and says his name is Mr. O'Houlihan (Howard Morris). Danny and Kathy think he's kidding when he says he's a leprechaun. After lunch, O'Houlihan would like to do something for the family to repay their kindness. Danny would just like to see him leave. After he does go, Danny tells Linda to not talk to strangers. Linda says he's coming to dinner tomorrow night. After dinner, Danny tells Kathy that he's going to expose O'Houlihan as a phony. Kathy wants no part of breaking Linda's heart and goes into another room. Danny asks him to make something disappear. Kathy comes back saying her purse is gone. Danny tells him to make the purse reappear. Rusty comes in the room with the purse. Danny now asks him to bring a pot of gold. Louise hands Danny a letter. It's a refund check from the IRS for $382. Danny calls for a Policeman (Allan Melvin) to get rid of O'Houlihan. The Policeman says he doesn't see anyone. After O'Houlihan leaves, the Policeman admits to knowing Sean O'Houlihan. He says Sean is a kind man who brings good cheer to people.
337	24	"Pupa from Italy"	Sheldon Leonard	Charles Stewart & Jack Elinson	March 16, 1964
Danny is showing the family and Charley a movie of a young Italian girl singer that they saw when they were there. Danny has sent for Piccola Pupa and wants her to perform at the Copa. Danny says what a ball of fire Pupa is and Charley is looking forward to meeting her. Rusty and Linda have been practicing their Italian. Pupa arrives with her Uncle Nino (Nestor Paiva). Pupa is much more sedate than Danny remembers. At the club, pianist Shelly Mills (Tom D'Andrea) is ready to accompany Pupa. Danny and Charley are surprised to learn that Pupa has traded in pop music for opera. Nino decided to make the change because opera is what he sang when he was younger. Nino thinks popular music is trash. Back at home, Louise suggests playing some popular music and Pupa starts dancing. Nino comes in and puts a stop to it. Shelly tells Danny and Charley that he found out that Nino didn't sing opera the way he claimed. Danny tells Nino what he knows. Danny can't bring himself to tell Pupa because she's so proud of her Uncle. Nino tells Danny to decide what is best for Pupa. Songs: Piccola Pupa sings "Or sai chi l'onore Rapire a me volse" and "Renalto, Renalto, Renalto".
338	25	"Pupa's Pooch"	Sheldon Leonard	Fred S. Fox & Iz Elinson	March 23, 1964
Danny and Pupa are rehearsing a number for the club. Charley wishes Pupa could stay longer than 3 weeks, because she's doing so well at the club. Louise tells Danny and Kathy that some food has gone missing the last couple of days. Danny and Kathy learn that Pupa smuggled in her dog Bambino from Italy. Pupa says she was hiding it because she was worried it would not be welcome here. Later, the door bell rings and Pupa hides the dog in the closet. The man at the door says he's Mr. Jacobs (Robert Patten) from the Dept. of Health. Jacobs wants to talk to Pupa about her dog and she starts crying. Jacobs tells Danny that any animal entering the country must be quarantined for a period of time. Pupa says the dog has never been without her and she is afraid he will die. Pupa is devastated when Jacobs takes the dog. Pupa does not perform well at the club and Charley thinks they should give her a few nights off. Danny hopes to pass off a similar looking dog as Bambino. Pupa is not fooled and wonders why Danny did it. Danny explains he did it because he loves her. Pupa says she can wait for Bambino because she has a family here. Charley says he will keep the dog. Songs: Danny and Piccola Pupa sing "Chattanooga Choo Choo". Pupa sings "Piove (Ciao, ciao bambina)".
339	26	"Pupa Loves Rusty"	Sheldon Leonard	Garry Marshall & Jerry Belson	March 30, 1964
Danny tells Pupa she needs to relax a little, maybe go out and play. Danny feels bad that Pupa has no real friends here. Despite the cost of a long distance call, he allows Pupa to call Florence, Italy. Kathy thinks Pupa should meet some boys. Danny and Kathy think Rusty should take Pupa out on some dates. Rusty says she is too young, he is 16 and Pupa is 12. Danny thinks Rusty should learn some Italian. Rusty says something in Italian that a friend wrote down for him. Pupa gets very excited after Rusty says one thing in particular. Apparently Rusty asked her to marry him and she says yes. Kathy talks to Pupa, but because the girl is so happy, Kathy did not have the heart to tell her it was a mistake. Danny cannot bring himself to tell Pupa either. Danny decides to throw a party and invite a lot of boys. At the party, all the boys want to dance with Pupa. Rusty panics when Pupa announces their engagement. But then she says she is also engaged to all the other boys. Ricky Kelman as Partygoer. Song: Piccola Pupa and Danny sing "Carolina in the Morning".
340	27	"Beautiful Lady"	Danny Thomas	Jack Elinson & Charles Stewart	April 6, 1964
Danny gets up early hoping to spend some time with his family. But they are all busy reading the paper. Danny sees in the paper that there is a Real Estate convention at the Plaza hotel. Beverly Turner (Marilyn Maxwell), President of the organization, will be there. Danny went to high school with a Beverly Turner. She was a tomboy and the captain of the baseball team. Her nickname was Moose, because she was built like one. He had one date with her, because she kept chasing Danny. Kathy thinks he should call her up. Beverly comes by and she is an incredibly beautiful woman. Danny is amazed and keeps hugging her. Kathy is not happy. Beverly stays for lunch and Danny fawns all over her. Kathy wonders why she never married and Beverly says she never found a man like Danny. Danny invites her to the Copa that evening. After Danny and Kathy come home from the club, Kathy makes Danny sleep on the couch. The next morning, Kathy tells Louise how Danny invited Beverly on the stage and they sang a duet together. Kathy goes to Beverly's hotel room to tell her off. She meets a heavy set woman who says she is Beverly Turner. She says the woman that Kathy met was an actress friend of hers. She wanted Danny to think that she made good. Kathy understands and will keep her secret.
341	28	"Call Off the Hounds"	Danny Thomas	Charles Stewart & Jack Elinson	April 13, 1964
Danny and Charley are busy at the club. Kathy and Bunny make a surprise visit and want to take the men out to lunch. The guys say they are too busy and send the women away. Back at Kathy's house, Bunny and Kathy are worried the guys are working themselves to death. Kathy answers the door and a little dressed up poodle walks in. Frank Cummings (Phil Arnold) has a trained dog act. He's been trying to see Danny. Bunny comes up with the idea to have the men think they're having a nervous breakdown. The next day, Danny and Charley are working from Danny's place. They are both starting to forget things. Charley answers the door and the little dressed up poodle comes in and goes to the kitchen. Kathy and Bunny tell Charley they did not see any dog. Now the dog comes in the room wearing angel wings. The girls pretend to not see it. Danny sees a dog with a little monkey on its back. The girls again pretend to not see it. More dogs appear. The guys run out of the apartment. Janitor Swenson tells Danny he has to get the dogs out of the building. The guys realize the wives tricked them and find a way to get back at them.
342	29	"Rusty and the Chorus Girl"	Danny Thomas	Iz Elinson & Fred S. Fox	April 20, 1964
Danny is with some of the chorus girls at the club. Rusty comes by and Danny introduces him to the girls. Charley would like a word with Danny. Rusty meets one of the girls, Wendy Collins (Jacklyn O'Donnell). She tells Rusty how handsome he is and asks him which college he goes to. Rusty says he will be going to college next year. He is pleased that Wendy thought he was that old. Rusty is completely smitten with Wendy and tells Danny he is going to marry her. At home, Rusty tries acting older. Kathy wants Danny to straighten Rusty out. At the club, Wendy's jealous boyfriend Brad Wilson is not happy that the band leader calls her honey. Danny comes by and mentions going on a date. Brad grabs Danny. Danny explains that he would like Wendy to go out with Rusty and make him understand that he is still a kid. Rusty comes by, asks Wendy out and she accepts. At home, Rusty overhears Danny tell Charley about his plan for Wendy to let Rusty down easy. Rusty now understands how much Danny cares for him. Rusty asks Danny to talk to Wendy and break the date.
343	30	"The Persistent Cop"	Danny Thomas	Fred S. Fox & Iz Elinson	April 27, 1964
Danny, Rusty and Louise are going over a song. Officer Johnson (Allan Melvin) comes to the door. Johnson isn't there because of noise complaints. Turns out Kathy asked him to come by. Johnson would like Danny to listen to a band from the poor side of town. Danny reluctantly agrees. Kathy wants Charley to hear them as well. The next day, Charley is not happy about having to be at Danny's place to hear the group. A Tailor (Vito Scotti) is there working on Danny's tuxedo. Herbie (Bob Denver) and the group arrive. The guys are very obnoxious and wind up leaving. Johnson says he should have been there and asks Danny to give them another chance. Danny refuses and Johnson leaves angry. The next day, something Johnson says makes Danny want to give the group another chance. Danny finds them and they want nothing to do with him. Mr. Silvers (Herbie Faye), the Candy Store owner, wonders why Danny is bothering with the guys. Danny tells the guys he came from nothing as well, but he just tried harder to make it. The guys come by Danny's place and Herbie apologizes. They perform for Danny and Charley and they turn out to be very good. Song: Danny sings "Please Don't Talk About Me When I'm Gone" with Rusty on drums and Louise on piano.
