= Sentimental & Melancholy =

Studio album by Joe Williams
- Released: 1961
- Genre: Jazz, pop
- Length: 65:00
- Label: Roulette Records
- Producer: Teddy Reig

Sentimental & Melancholy is a 1961 studio album recorded by jazz singer Joe Williams, produced by Teddy Reig, and arranged and conducted by Jimmy Jones. It was released on Roulette Records. In 2004, Sentimental & Melancholy was paired with another album by Williams, 1959's Joe Williams Sings About You!, when they were released on CD. It was included as part of another compilation album when it paired with 1960's With Songs About That Kind of Woman in 2015.

== Reception ==
AllMusic rated the album 4 out of 5 stars.

== Track listing ==
1. "Ev'ry Time We Say Goodbye" (Cole Porter) - 3:52
2. "Day by Day" (Sammy Cahn, Axel Stordahl, Paul Weston) - 1:50
3. "Just as Though You Were Here" (Eddie DeLange, John Benson Brooks) - 2:38
4. "For All We Know" (Sam Lewis, J. Fred Coots) - 3:10
5. "You Leave Me Breathless" (Ralph Freed, Friedrich Hollaender) - 2:16
6. "Love Is the Sweetest Thing" (Ray Noble) - 3:25
7. "Did I Remember" (Harold Adamson, Walter Donaldson) - 2:20
8. "Darn That Dream" (Eddie DeLange, Jimmy Van Heusen) - 2:34
9. "Stay as Sweet as You Are" (Mack Gordon, Harry Revel) - 2:49
10. "Just Plain Lonesome" (Johnny Burke, Jimmy Van Heusen) - 2:52
