= At Newport '63 (Joe Williams album) =

Live album by Joe Williams
- Released: 1963
- Recorded: July 5–17, 1963, Newport Jazz Festival, Rhode Island
- Genre: Vocal jazz
- Length: 52:17
- Label: RCA Victor LPM 2762
- Producer: George Avakian

Joe Williams chronology
Jump for Joy (1963)	At Newport '63 (1963)	Me and the Blues (1963)

At Newport '63 is a 1963 live album by jazz singer Joe Williams, recorded at the 1963 Newport Jazz Festival.

== Reception ==
Professional ratings
Review scores
Source	Rating
Allmusic	3/5 stars

Billboard reviewed At Newport '63 upon its release in their 16 November 1963 issue. Billboard commented that "The performances are excitingly fresh with everyone improvising for the live audience. Joe should do a lot of business with this one".

John Bush, writing on Allmusic.com said of the album that "Williams displays all of his talents—a subtle blend of blues singer, band singer, and rhythm singer—and proves himself quite the triple threat in the process." Joel Roberts writing for All About Jazz said of the album that "Few jazz singers can handle the down-and-dirty blues as well as Williams, and with this stellar cast behind him, the results are predictably explosive".

== Track listing ==
1. "Without a Song" (Edward Eliscu, Billy Rose, Vincent Youmans) – 1:35
2. Spoken Word Introduction by Joe Williams – 1:14
3. "Gravy Waltz" (Steve Allen, Ray Brown) – 2:20
4. "She's Warm, She's Willing, She's Wonderful" (Marvin Fisher, Jack Segal) – 2:33
5. "Come Back Baby" (Ray Charles, Lowell Fulson) – 4:42
6. Medley: "All God's Chillun Got Rhythm"/"Do You Wanna Jump, Children?" (Walter Jurmann, Gus Kahn, Bronisław Kaper)/(Jimmy Van Heusen, Willie Bryant, Victor Selsman) – 2:45
7. "Wayfaring Stranger" (traditional) – 13:32
8. "Every Day I Have the Blues" (Pinetop Sparks) – 3:39
9. "Anytime, Anyday, Anywhere" (Ned Washington, Lee Wiley, Victor Young) – 2:07
10. "April in Paris" (Vernon Duke, E.Y. "Yip" Harburg) – 5:12
11. "In the Evening (When the Sun Goes Down)" (Big Bill Broonzy, Leroy Carr, Don Raye) – 4:56
12. "Some of This 'N' Some of That" (Mack David, Joe Williams, Sidney Wyche) – 3:50
13. "Roll 'Em Pete" (Pete Johnson, Big Joe Turner) – 5:45

== Personnel ==
Performance

- Joe Williams – vocals, arranger
- Marl Young – arranger
- Bob Cranshaw – bass
- Mickey Roker – drums
- Clark Terry – flugelhorn, trumpet
- Junior Mance – piano
- Coleman Hawkins – tenor saxophone
- Zoot Sims – tenor saxophone
- Ben Webster – tenor saxophone
- Thad Jones – trumpet
- Howard McGhee – trumpet

Production

- George Avakian – liner notes, producer
- Mickey Crofford – engineer
- James Gavin – liner notes
- Charles Harbutt – mastering, mixing
- Ben Young – reissue producer
- Joshua Sherman – series producer
