= ArgoFilms =

Documentary film company

- Industry: Entertainment
- Founded: 1990
- Founder: Allison Argo
- Headquarters: Cape Cod, Massachusetts
- Products: Wildlife documentaries
- Website: http://www.argofilms.com/

ArgoFilms is a production company specializing in documentary filmmaking. Established in 1990, ArgoFilms has received six Emmy Awards, a duPont-Columbia Award for Journalism, four Genesis Awards, and over one hundred other awards internationally.

Allison Argo, who serves as producer, director, writer, editor, and narrator for ArgoFilms, began the company with the goal of "lending a voice to those who cannot speak for themselves." The company focusing especially on endangered species and captive animal issues.

Frogs: The Thin Green Line, Chimpanzees: An Unnatural History, and Crash: A Tale of Two Species are acclaimed documentaries produced in collaboration with National Geographic and PBS. In total, ArgoFilms has created fifteen films for National Geographic and PBS.

In 2012, the company’s first feature film, The Story of Dao, was in pre-production.

== History ==
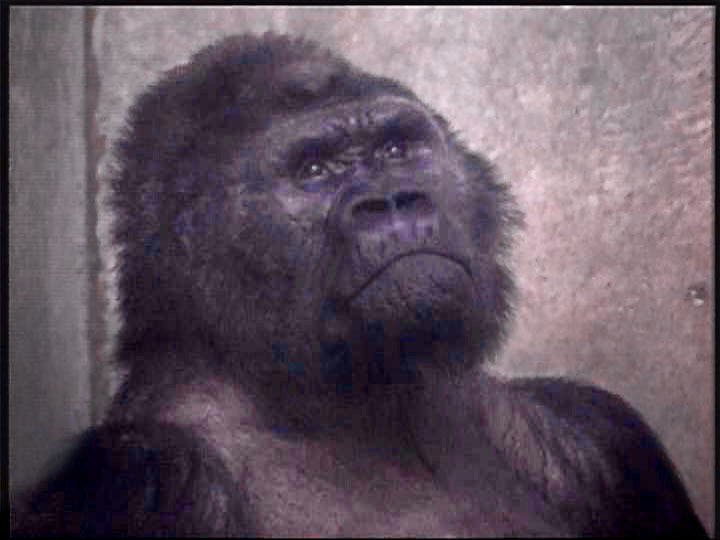
Ivan in Tacoma, Washington (1989)

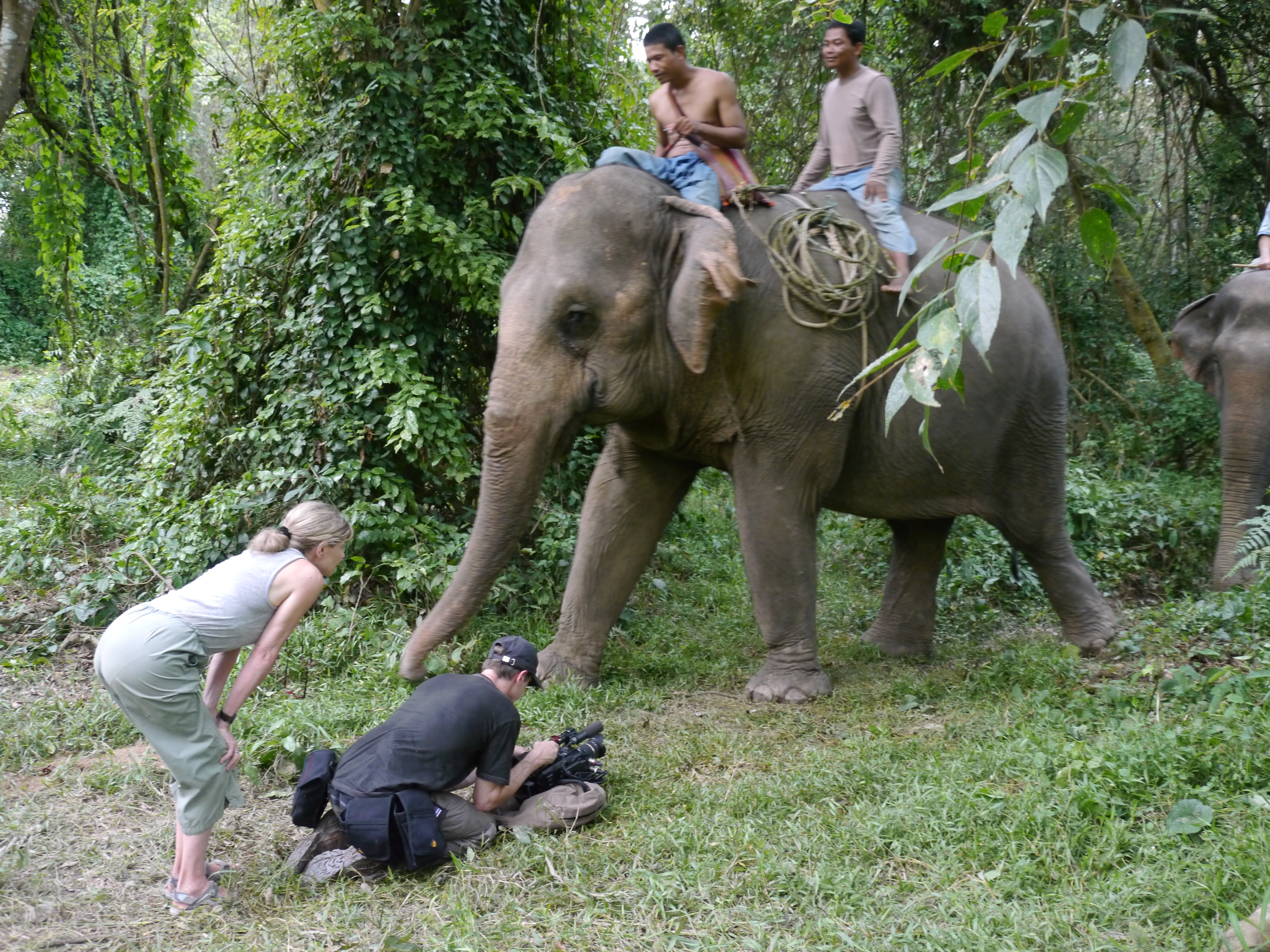
Director Allison Argo and cinematographer Joe Pontecorvo in Northern Thailand, 2011

In the late 1980s, Allison Argo encountered a captive gorilla named Ivan living inside a shopping mall in Tacoma, Washington. For over two decades, Ivan had lived in a concrete enclosure without exposure to natural light or other gorillas. Prompted by this encounter, Argo left her career as an actress to produce films on conservation and captive animal welfare.

The Urban Gorilla, directly inspired by Ivan’s condition, took three years for ArgoFilms to complete as their first production. The team included Allison Argo as writer, director, and producer; Argo’s then-husband, Director of Photography Robert E. Collins, as principal cinematographer; and Glenn Close as narrator. The film, broadcast by National Geographic, was nominated for two national Emmys, and received a 1992 Alfred I. duPont–Columbia University Award.

After the success of The Urban Gorilla, National Geographic approached Argo to discuss further collaboration. This led to ArgoFilms’ second documentary, Keepers of the Wild, for which Argo won a 1992 National Emmy for Directing. Filming for Keepers of the Wild spanned Kenya, Belize, Canada, and the US, starting ArgoFilms’ international travel. Argo wrote, directed, and produced the film, with Glenn Close once again performing as narrator.

== Productions ==
Since 1990, ArgoFilms has produced 14 documentaries, as well as shorter films to support wildlife and conservation causes. The company frequently collaborates with National Geographic Television, PBS, and Thirteen/WNET. Six of ArgoFilms’ documentaries were produced for the PBS Nature series.

Year	Film Title	Involvement	Notes
1990	The Urban Gorilla	producer, director, writer, editor	Nominated – 1990 Emmy Award; Nominated – 1990 Emmy Award; DuPont-Columbia Award; Jackson Hole Wildlife Film Festival – First recipient of the Best Newcomer award Christopher Columbus Award; WorldFest-Houston International Film Festival Award; Genesis Award; Narrator – Glenn Close
1992	Keepers of the Wild	producer, director, writer	Won – 1992 National Emmy Award for directing Christopher Columbus Award; Narrator – Glenn Close
1996	The Last Frog	producer, director, writer, narrator	Won – 1996 National Emmy Award; Jackson Hole Wildlife Film Festival Award; Japan international Wildlife Film Festival Award; Missoula International Wildlife Film Festival Best of Festival; Earthwatch Award
1997	Stolen Treasures	producer, director, writer, narrator	
1997	King Cobra	writer	Won - 1997 Emmy Award News and Documentary
1997	Lords of the Everglades	writer	
1997	Extraordinary Dogs	producer, director	Finalist - Jackson Hole Wildlife Film Festival
1997	Snake Invasion	producer, director, writer, narrator	
1999	Secret Life of Cats	producer, director, writer, narrator	Won – 1999 National Emmy Award; Jackson Hole Wildlife Film Festival; Japan international Wildlife Film Festival; International Wildlife Film Festival; ITVA Peer Awards; Christopher Columbus Award
1999	Wisdom of the Wild	producer, director, writer, narrator	
2000	The Urban Elephant	producer, director, writer, narrator	Won – 2001 Emmy Award for Outstanding Cultural & Informational Documentary – Best Director; The New York Festivals World Medal; Genesis Award
2003	Inca Mummies: Secrets of a Lost World	producer, director, writer, narrator	ITVA Peer Awards
2004	Return to Freedom	producer, director, writer, narrator, editor	A short film for the American Wild Horse Sanctuary
2006	Chimpanzees: An Unnatural History	producer, director, writer, narrator	Won - 2007 National Emmy Award for Outstanding Individual Achievement in a Craft: Research; Genesis Award; Best Editing, Best Television Program $250,000-$500,000 Budget, Merit for Powerful Storytelling, and Merit for Advocacy at the International Wildlife Film Festival; Christopher Columbus Award; Explorer's Club
2008	Crash: A Tale of Two Species	producer, director, writer, editor, narrator	31st International Wildlife Film Festival: Sapphire Award-Second Place, Best Conservation & Environmental Issue, Best Script; Nominated - National Emmy Award
2009	Frogs: The Thin Green Line	producer, director, writer, editor, narrator	Selection for DC Environmental Film Fest
2011	9/11: Where Were You?	producer, director, writer, editor	This film is about immediate responses to the attack on the World Trade Center.
2013	Parrot Confidential	producer, writer, editor, narrator	Genesis Award; Special Jury Award, New York Wild Film Festival

ArgoFilms is in pre-production for The Story of Dao, the company’s first full-length feature film. The film is based on the life of an elephant named Pang Dao, whom Argo first encountered during the filming of The Urban Elephant for PBS Nature and National Geographic.

The Story of Dao began pre-production in 2011. The film’s six-week scout in Southeast Asia was funded by a Kickstarter campaign, which received over $25,000 from over 200 backers.
