= I Went Out of My Way =

Song
- Released: May 9, 1941
- Genre: Vocal
- Songwriter: Helen Bliss
- Composer: Helen Bliss
- Lyricist: Helen Bliss

I Went Out of My Way is a ballad written and composed by Helen Bliss, a songwriter and composer who also wrote the songs "Twitterpated" and "Thumper Song" for the 1942 Disney film Bambi., alongside Robert Sour and Henry Manners. It was first recorded on May 9, 1941 by Orrin Tucker and his orchestra on a Columbia Records 78 rpm vinyl. The song describes going to great lengths for love, even when faced with challenges and heartache. The lyrics convey a sense of nostalgia and longing for a past love, highlighting the willingness to endure pain for the sake of cherished memories and moments shared with that special someone. The song was featured in the 1955 heist film 5 Against the House. Since its release, it has been covered by other famous musicians, including The Norman Luboff Choir, Bob Stewart, Tommy Leonetti, Joan Merrill, Ruth Gaylor, Jackie Gleason, Joe Williams, Claude Thornhill, and Will Bradley.

== Covers ==
- Eddy Howard and his orchestra (1941, Shellac Records, 78 RPM vinyl)
- Bobby Byrne and his orchestra (1941, vocals by Stuart Wade, Decca Records)
- Jan Savitt and his Tophatters (1941, vocals by Allan De Witt, Victor Records)
- Will Bradley and his orchestra (1941 live recording at Hotel Astor, New York, vocals by Terry Allen)
- Joan Merrill with the Lou Bring Orchestra (1941)
- Ruth Gaylor with the Teddy Powell orchestra (1941)
- Connie Boswell (1941, Decca Records)
- Frankie Masters and his orchestra (1941, Okeh Records)
- Teddy Powell and his Orchestra (1941, Bluebird Records)
- Tommy Leonetti with the Nelson Riddle orchestra (1954, Columbia Records as well as Capitol Records)
- Claude Thornhill and his orchestra (vocals by Dick Harding, 1941 or 1947)
- Paul Weston and his orchestra with the Norman Luboff Choir (1954, 78 RPM vinyl)
- Bob Stewart with the Joe Lipman Orchestra (1954)
- Jackie Gleason and his orchestra on the album The Gentle Touch (1961)
- Joe Williams on the 1963 album Jump for Joy
