= Joe Williams Live! A Swingin' Night at Birdland =

Live album by Joe Williams
- Released: 1962
- Recorded: June 1962 at Birdland, New York City
- Genre: Jazz, traditional pop
- Length: 32:56
- Label: Roulette R-52085
- Producer: Teddy Reig

Joe Williams chronology
Have a Good Time with Joe Williams (1957)	Joe Williams Live! A Swingin' Night at Birdland (1962)	Jump for Joy (1963)

Joe Williams Live! A Swingin' Night at Birdland is a 1962 live album by the American jazz singer Joe Williams recorded at the Birdland jazz club in New York City.

Scott Yanow, reviewing the album for Allmusic, praises the "strong quintet" accompanying Williams and his "well-rounded and thoroughly enjoyable set".

The initial Billboard review from October 27, 1962, listed the album as having 'Strong Sales Potential' and described it as a "swinging album that shows off [Williams] vibrant vocal style" and that he "comes through with exciting performances of blues and ballads".

== Track listing ==
1. "September in the Rain" (Al Dubin, Harry Warren) – 2:50
2. "Come Back Baby" (Walter Davis) – 5:57
3. "5 O'clock in the Morning" (Joe Williams) – 2:49
4. "By the River St. Marie" (Edgar Leslie, Harry Warren) – 3:24
5. "This Can't Be Love" (Richard Rodgers, Lorenz Hart) – 1:50
6. "Teach Me Tonight" (Sammy Cahn, Gene DePaul) – 4:03
7. "Alright, Okay, You Win" (Sidney Wyche) – 2:41
8. "I Was Telling Her About You" (Moose Charlap, Don George) – 3:51
9. "Have You Met Miss Jones?" (Rodgers, Hart) – 1:40
10. "Roll 'Em Pete" (Pete Johnson, Big Joe Turner) – 4:12
11. "You're Everything But Mine" – 1:47
12. "Falling in Love with Love" (Rodgers, Hart) – 2:57
13. "Going to Chicago Blues" (Count Basie, Jimmy Rushing) – 4:54
14. "The Very Thought of You" (Ray Noble) – 5:31

== Personnel ==
- Joe Williams – vocals
- Jimmy Forrest – tenor saxophone
- Harry "Sweets" Edison – trumpet
- Hugh Lawson – piano
- Ike Isaacs – double bass
- Clarence Johnson – drums

Production

- Tristan Powell – engineer, remixing
- Chris Sheridan – liner notes
- Teddy Reig – production
- Michael Cuscuna – reissue producer
