= Karen Morrow =

American singer and actress (born 1936)

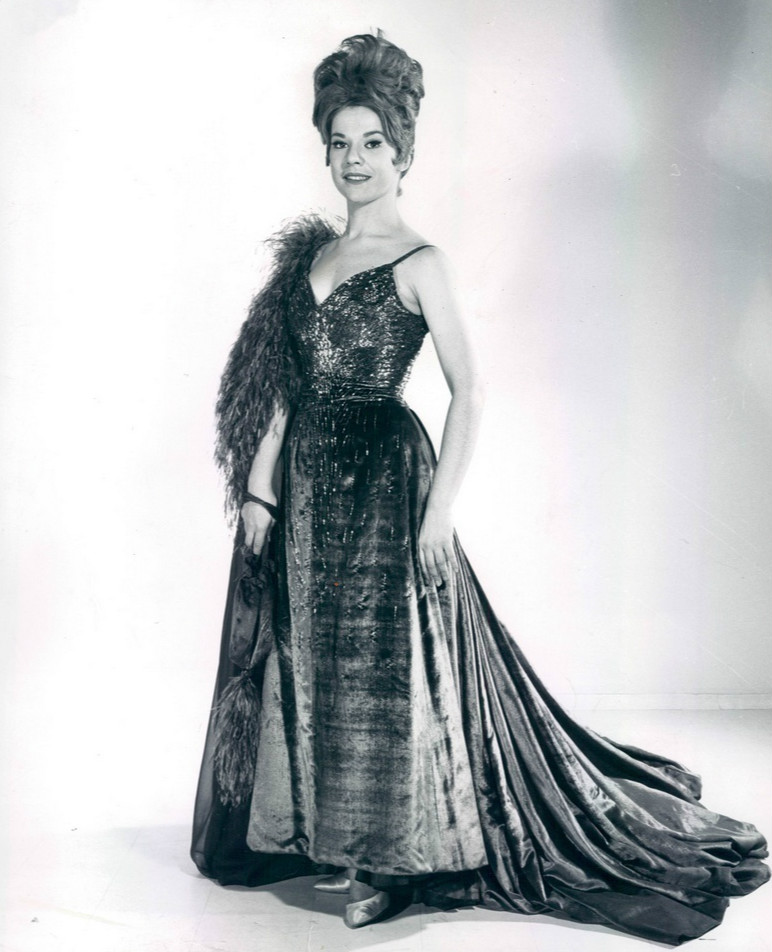
- Morrow in 1962
- Born: Karen Jane Morrow; December 15, 1936 (age 89); Chicago, Illinois, U.S.
- Occupations: Actress, singer
- Years active: 1958–present
- Website: karenmorrow.com

Karen Jane Morrow (born December 15, 1936) is an American singer and actress best known for her work in musical theater. Her honors include an Emmy Award and a Theatre World Award, and an Ovation Award and five Drama-Logue Award nominations.

== Early life and Broadway career ==
Morrow was born in Chicago and raised in Des Moines, Iowa by parents who were both classical singers. As a teenager, she heard recordings by actress/singer Susan Johnson, which inspired her to try musical theater, beginning with the role of Meg in Brigadoon.

After graduating from St. Joseph Academy (Des Moines, Iowa) in 1954, she graduated from Clarke College in 1958. She then moved to Milwaukee, Wisconsin, where she taught and performed on the side, and then moved to Manhattan. Her career began with an appearance in the Off-Broadway show Sing, Muse! in 1961; she won a 1962 Theatre World Award for her performance. She played Luce in a 1963 Off-Broadway revival of Rodgers & Hart's The Boys from Syracuse and a number of roles in City Center over the next five years, including The Most Happy Fella in 1966 as Cleo.

I Had a Ball, Morrow's first Broadway production, opened in December 1964, and ran for six months. Most of Morrow's later Broadway productions had short runs despite some impressive casts. Two years later, she appeared as Mary Texas in A Joyful Noise, a misconceived effort to incorporate country music into a Broadway show. It closed after four previews and 12 performances. Next she played Na'Ama in 1968's I'm Solomon, which closed after nine previews and seven performances. In November 1971, she appeared as Babylove in The Grass Harp (co-starring Barbara Cook, based on Truman Capote's novel of the same name), which lasted one week at the Martin Beck Theatre, but brought her good notices, especially for her rendition of "Babylove Miracle Show". In 1972, Morrow appeared as Irene Jantzen in another short-lived Broadway production, The Selling of the President, which had 5 regular performances. Her last Broadway performance was as The Princess Puffer/Miss Angela Prysock in The Mystery of Edwin Drood, as a replacement, in December 1986.

Asked why so many of the Broadway shows that she appeared in were flops, Morrow said "I've analyzed this, trying to think of why I've had so many flops. I keep coming back to my contemporaries...it was always the ones who could sing but also had something extra, something interesting about themselves...I think with me, I was just a singer with a big voice and I was pleasant, and that can only take you so far."

== Later years ==
From 1969, she lived in Los Angeles, where she worked on local cable in a short-lived series titled Singin' that co-starred her friend and peer Nancy Dussault and appeared regularly on The Jim Nabors Hour (1969), The Merv Griffin Show, The Tonight Show and Match Game. She won an Emmy Award (with Nancy Dussault) for the PBS program Cabaret Tonight.

Other TV work included appearances on Girl Talk (1968), Love, American Style (1973/two episodes), Medical Center (1974), Paul Sand in Friends & Lovers (1974), Karen (1975/two episodes), Starsky & Hutch (1976), Tabitha (1977), Alice (1979), Friends (1979), Ladies' Man (1980), The Love Boat (1979 and 1982/two episodes), Too Close for Comfort (1983), Trapper John, M.D. (1983), Goodnight, Beantown (1984), Falcon Crest (1988/two episodes), Murder, She Wrote (1988–1989), Night Court (1989) and Sabrina, the Teenage Witch (1996–97).

Morrow appeared in three TV movies: Eve Wister in I Was a Mail Order Bride (1982), Martha Biggs in The Boy in the Plastic Bubble (1976), and Mrs. Turner in Cage Without a Key (1975).

She was also a regular on Garrison Keillor's A Prairie Home Companion.

Her stage work outside of New York has included Parthy in Show Boat (1997, national tour of the 1994 Broadway production), Die Fledermaus, It's a Bird...It's a Plane...It's Superman (1967 revival), Anything Goes, Annie Get Your Gun, Sally Adams in Call Me Madam (2000), Hello, Dolly!, Oliver!, Carlotta in Follies (1990 Long Beach Civic Light Opera) Sweeney Todd and A New Brain. She also has appeared in concerts with major orchestras in Los Angeles, Milwaukee, and Honolulu.

She can be heard on the 2002 concept album Miss Spectacular, a studio recording of an unproduced work by Jerry Herman, with whom she has worked and recorded extensively. Other albums include An Evening with Jerry Herman (1998).

Morrow taught musical theatre performance at UCLA and continues to teach master classes in performance and audition skills. She is a member of the faculty of the American Musical and Dramatic Academy.

== Filmography ==
Year	Title	Role	Notes
1962	The Red Skelton Show	Guest Vocalist	episode: "One Good Intern Deserves Another"
1969–1970	The Jim Nabors Hour	Blanche	episodes #1.2, #1.15
1973	Love, American Style	Elizabeth / Mrs. Sommers	segments: "Love and the Vertical Romance", "Love and the Odd Couples"
1974	Medical Center	Norma	episode: "The World's Balloon"
1974	Paul Sand in Friends & Lovers	Trudy	episode: "Maid in the Snow"
1975	Cage Without a Key	Mrs. Turner	TV movie
1975	Karen	Cerita	episode: "A Day in the Life"
1976	Good Heavens	Lila	episode: "Jack the Ribber and Me"
1976	The Boy in the Plastic Bubble	Martha Biggs	TV movie
1976	Starsky & Hutch	Mitzi Graham	episode: "Nightmare"
1977–1978	Tabitha	Aunt Minerva	main role (12 episodes)
1979	Alice	Ina Simpson	episode: "Alice's Decision"
1979	Friends	Pamela Richards	main role (5 episodes)
1979	The Love Boat	Daphne Knox	Episode: "The Grass Is Always Greener/Three Stages of Love/Oldies but Good"
1979–1980	Password Plus	Herself	March 1979 and October 1980
1980	That's Me, Too	Værtshusgæst	movie
1980–1981	Ladies' Man	Betty Brill	main role (16 episodes)
1982	The Love Boat	Ruth Gaylor	Episode: "Baby Talk/My Friend, the Executrix/Programmed for Love"
1982	I Was a Mail Order Bride	Eve Whister	TV movie
1983	Too Close for Comfort	Karen Day	episode: "The Yearning Point"
1983	Trapper John, M.D.	Karen	episode: "May Divorce Be with You"
1983	Goodnight, Beantown	Pauline	2 episodes: "Invasions of Privacy", "Valerie's Fan"
1988	Falcon Crest	Bernice Haberman	2 episodes: "Hornet's Nest", "A Madness Most Discreet"
1989	Murder, She Wrote	Gladys	episode: "Double Exposure"
1989	Night Court	Amanda Caswell	episode: "For Love or Money"
1997	Sabrina, the Teenage Witch	Nana	episode: "Sweet Charity"
