= I Only Have Eyes for You =

1934 song written by Al Dubin and composed by Harry Warren

Song
- Published: 1934 by Remick Music Corp.
- Composer: Harry Warren
- Lyricist: Al Dubin

"I Only Have Eyes for You" is a song by composer Harry Warren and lyricist Al Dubin. The song was written for the 1934 film Dames, in which it was performed by Dick Powell. Several other successful recordings of the song were made in 1934, and it later became a hit for the Flamingos in 1959 and Art Garfunkel in 1975. In June 2026, CBS News included the song in its list of the 250 essential American songs of the past 250 years.

== Charting versions ==
=== 1934 versions ===
In addition to the original version by Dick Powell, recordings of the song by Ben Selvin (vocal by Howard Phillips), Eddy Duchin (vocal by Lew Sherwood), and Jane Froman became hits in 1934.

=== The Flamingos version ===
"I Only Have Eyes for You"

Single by the Flamingos

from the album Flamingo Serenade
- B-side: "Goodnight, Sweetheart"; "At the Prom"
- Released: May 1959
- Studio: Bell Sound (New York City)
- Genre: Doo-wop; pop; rock and roll
- Length: 3:20
- Label: End
- Songwriters: Harry Warren, Al Dubin
- Producer: George Goldner

The Flamingos singles chronology
| "Love Walked In" (1959) | "I Only Have Eyes for You" (1959) | "Yours" (1959) |

The Flamingos recorded a doo-wop adaptation of "I Only Have Eyes for You" at Bell Sound Studios in New York City in 1959. Their version was commercially successful, peaking at number 11 on the US Billboard Hot 100 chart and number 3 on the Billboard Hot R&B chart. In Canada it reached number 7.

Building on the surprise success of the Flamingos' single "Lovers Never Say Goodbye", which had become a number 52 crossover hit on the Hot 100 in February 1959, "I Only Have Eyes for You" was selected by producer George Goldner among a group of 33 standards that the Flamingos might record for the album Flamingo Serenade. The Flamingos recorded a dozen songs from Goldner's list, but "I Only Have Eyes for You" proved difficult. Flamingos high tenor Terry "Buzzy" Johnson, who was also the group's arranger, was advised by lead tenor Nate Nelson to do something exotic with the refrain: "Go way out on it! Make it Russian, like 'Song of the Volga Boatman'". The solution came to Johnson while he was sleeping, and he quickly called the group to his room at around 4 am to have them rehearse the new version, complete with doo-wop backing vocals and harmonies. In the studio, Johnson directed the session musicians to play piano, guitar and gentle brush-driven drums in a stretched-out triplet rhythm, emphasizing the third of the chord in the guitar and the fifth in the piano. This created a floating counter-melody to the vocal harmonies. Heavy reverberation was added to the vocals at the mastering stage, under the direction of Goldner.

Goldner initially thought the song was not commercial enough to be a single, and so he sequenced it first on side two of the album Flamingo Serenade. Radio DJs started playing the song, however, and it was released as a single in early May 1959. It first entered the Billboard pop chart on May 30 at number sixty, peaking at number eleven in July. The Billboard Year-End chart ranked it as the 73rd biggest hit of 1959.

Rolling Stone magazine placed the Flamingos' version of "I Only Have Eyes for You" at number 158 on their 2011 list of the "500 Greatest Songs of All Time". In 2003, it was inducted into the Grammy Hall of Fame. In 2009, Johnson said the song was making even more money for him at the time than when the Flamingos were together.

=== Cliff Richard version ===
A 1964 recording by Cliff Richard and the Norrie Paramor Orchestra peaked at number 31 on the Australian chart.

=== The Lettermen version ===
A 1966 recording by the Lettermen went to number 4 on the US Easy Listening chart and number 72 on Hot 100.

=== Jerry Butler version ===
In 1972, Jerry Butler's version on Mercury records spent eight weeks on the Billboard R&B chart, reaching a positional high of number 20. It also charted in the Billboard Hot 100, reaching number 85.

=== Zapp Version ===
In 1985, Zapp made a cover of the song in the album The New Zapp IV U

=== Art Garfunkel version ===
"I Only Have Eyes for You"

Single by Art Garfunkel

from the album Breakaway
- B-side: "Looking for the Right One"
- Released: August 1975
- Recorded: 1975
- Genre: Soft rock
- Length: 3:30
- Label: Columbia
- Songwriters: Harry Warren, Al Dubin
- Producer: Richard Perry

Art Garfunkel singles chronology
| "Second Avenue" (1974) | "I Only Have Eyes for You" (1975) | "Break Away" (1975) |

A recording of the song by Art Garfunkel was a number-one hit on the UK Singles Chart in October 1975 for two weeks, In the US, the song reached number 18 on the U.S. Billboard Hot 100 and No. 1 on the Billboard Adult Contemporary chart. In Canada, the song also reached number one on the RPM middle-of-the-road chart and number eight on the top singles chart. Garfunkel performed "I Only Have Eyes for You" on the second episode of Saturday Night Live.

== Album appearances ==
In addition to Flamingo Serenade, the version by the Flamingos appears on the following compilation albums:

- Golden Goodies, Vol. 2, Roulette Records, 1963 (R-25210)
- Original Golden Hits of the Great Groups, Mercury Records, 1963 (MG 20809)
- 41 Original Hits from the Soundtrack of American Graffiti, MCA Records, 1973 (MCA2-8001)
- Rock 'N Soul 1959, ABC Records, 1973 (ABCX-1959)
- The Best of Doo Wop Ballads, Vol. 2, Rhino Records, 1989 (R1 70904)
- Art Laboe's 60 Killer Oldies, Original Sound, 1995 CD (OSCD 4001)

== Other versions ==
- Joe Williams on the album Joe Williams Sings About You! (1959)
