= Just Friends (John Klenner and Sam M. Lewis song) =

Jazz standard written in 1931

"Just Friends" is a popular song that has become a jazz standard. The song was written in 1931 by John Klenner with lyrics by Sam M. Lewis. Although introduced by Red McKenzie and His Orchestra in October 1931, it first became a hit when singer Russ Columbo performed it with Leonard Joy’s Orchestra in 1932. It charted again the same year in a version by Ben Selvin and His Orchestra and has been recorded often since.

== Other recordings ==
- Red McKenzie – 1931
- Tommy Bond - 1933 in Mush and Milk
- Charlie Parker – 1949
- Sarah Vaughan – 1949
- Chet Baker – 1955
- Frank Sinatra - No One Cares (1959) arranged by Gordon Jenkins.
- Cecil Taylor with John Coltrane – Coltrane Time (1959)
- Lee Konitz with Bill Evans – Live at the Half Note (1959/1994)
- Grant Green - First Session (1960-1961)
- Sonny Rollins with Coleman Hawkins – Sonny Meets Hawk! (1963)
- Tony Bennett with Stan Getz and Herbie Hancock – Jazz (1964)
- Pat Martino – El Hombre (1967)
- Oscar Peterson – Walking the Line (1971)
- Earl Hines – Fatha Plays Classics (1977)
- Joe Pass – I Remember Charlie Parker (1979)
- Dizzy Gillespie with Oscar Peterson, Freddie Hubbard, and Clark Terry – The Trumpet Summit Meets the Oscar Peterson Big 4 (1980)
- Sun Ra & His Arkestra - Just Friends (Saturn XI, 1983)
- Stan Getz with Chet Baker – Line for Lyons (1983)
- Larry Coryell – Toku Do (1988)
- Joe Williams – In Good Company (1989)
- Jack Sheldon - Jack Sheldon Sings (1993)
- Emmet Cohen and Patrick Bartley - (2021)
- Michael Mayo - "Fly" (2024)

== See also ==
- List of 1930s jazz standards
