= Hot Target =

- Directed by: Dennis Lewiston
- Written by: Dennis Lewiston
- Produced by: John Barnett; Brian W. Cook
- Starring: Simone Griffeth; Steve Marachuk
- Cinematography: Alec Mills
- Edited by: Michael Horton
- Music by: Gil Mellé
- Release date: 1985
- Running time: 92 min
- Country: New Zealand
- Language: English

Hot Target, also known as Restless is a New Zealand - United Kingdom film that was released in 1985. It was written and directed by Dennis Lewiston.

== Cast ==
- Simone Griffeth as Christine
- Steve Marachuk as Lester
- Bryan Marshall as Clive
- Peter McCauley as Detective Inspector Nolan

== Reception ==
Stephen Hunter from the Baltimore Sun wrote it was "It's well acted and well made; more important, it offers a brief taste of pleasures exiled from American movie theatres for at least two decades." Lou Cedrone, writing in Baltimore's Evening Sun, says it is "a neatly plotted suspense film, a well-developed tribute to the Film Noir, the Gloria Graham-Humphrey Bogart movies Hollywood did the Forties" Variety reviewer James Greenberg noted that it "starts out as a soft-core romance, complete with appropriately tacky music, but eventually hardens into a Claude Chabrolesque exploration of obsessive passion among the rich and restless." He said "It is in fact a good deal above average with writer / director Denis Lewiston displaying considerable talent as well as lapses, from his inexperience."

Henry Edgar from Virginia's Daily Press says "The film has some intriguing moments, though the sparks are never quite hot enough to sizzle." and notes ""Hot Target" could have survived a predictable story if the stars had the proper charisma". Dayton Daily News's Terry Lawson writes "Body Heat it isn't, but Hot Target, a New Zealand import, is a mildly sexy and engaging little romance that eventually turns into a noir-like thriller, complete with the usual twists and turns of the genre." He says "Lewiston has a certain feel for this material, and one would like to see what he might accomplish in the same general area with a bigger budget and a more accomplished cast."

Chris Gladden of The Roanoke Times ends his reviews ""Hot Target" isn't even tepid outside the bedroom scenes and the only real mystery involved is why it's playing at two theaters in the Roanoke area." The Staines Informer's John Brooker says "This daffy New Zealand rip-off of Thief of Hearts slowly sinks in the west as the plot becomes more and more improbable." Richmond Times-Dispatch's Douglas Durden notes the similarity to Thief of Hearts ans says ""Hot Target" takes a harder R-rated approach, thereby losing any subtle charm this contrived story might have had." John Oliver from the Swindon Advertiser wrote it was "Soft porn — and very badly done soft porn — tries to disguise itself as an erotic thriller and fails dismally." In Standard-Speaker Bill Hagen criticises the poor acting, saying it was unintentionally hilarious, and calls the film "a bomb of nuclear proportions". Cinema Aotearoa wrote "A misogynistic and paper-thin story draped over slimy collection of softcore sex scenes and saxophone music, the film is such a product of its time that viewing it today is uncomfortably hilarious."

Helen Martin in New Zealand film, 1912-1996 wrote "Restless may be interesting for the amount of sweat produced during the lovemaking, the dogs are nice and the ending a surprise, but, in spite of its billing as a thriller, it's a film that never really happens. Hints of complications to come - in Clive's suspicion of his wife, in Ben's sinister aspect and in hinted-at business deals between ruthless partners - turn out to be no more than fillers to pad out an otherwise insubstantial plot."
