= My Funny Valentine =

1937 song by Richard Rodgers and Lorenz Hart

Song
- Published: 1937 by Chappell & Co.
- Genre: Traditional pop
- Composer: Richard Rodgers
- Lyricist: Lorenz Hart

"My Funny Valentine" is a show tune from the 1937 Rodgers and Hart coming of age musical Babes in Arms in which it was introduced by teenaged star Mitzi Green. The song became a popular jazz standard, appearing on over 1300 albums performed by over 600 artists. One of them was Chet Baker, for whom it became a signature song. In 2015 the Gerry Mulligan quartet's 1953 version of the song (featuring Chet Baker) was inducted into the Library of Congress's National Recording Registry for its "cultural, artistic and/or historical significance to American society and the nation’s audio legacy". Mulligan also recorded the song with his Concert Jazz Band in 1960.

== History ==
Babes in Arms opened at the Shubert Theatre on Broadway, in New York City on April 14, 1937 and ran for 289 performances. In the original play, a character named Billie Smith (played by Mitzi Green) sings the song to Valentine "Val" LaMar (played by Ray Heatherton). The character's name was changed to match the lyric of this song.

In the song, Billie describes Valentine's characteristics in unflattering and derogatory terms (at one point Billie describes Valentine's looks as "laughable", in keeping with the title), but ultimately affirms that he makes her smile and that she does not want him to change. The description of Valentine was consistent with Lorenz Hart's own insecurities and belief that he was too short and ugly to be loved. The lyrics are sufficiently gender-neutral to allow the song to be sung about a person of any gender, and a large proportion of cover versions of the song have been by men describing a hypothetical woman.

=== Chart versions and covers ===
The song first hit the charts in 1945, performed by Hal McIntyre with vocals by Ruth Gaylor. It only appeared for one week and hit No. 16. Frank Sinatra recorded a hit version in 1954.

In addition to Chet Baker's 1954 recording, the song has also been covered by Nico, Kenny Rogers, Elvis Costello, Miles Davis, Ella Fitzgerald, Steve Goodman, Rickie Lee Jones, Chaka Khan, Julie London, Harpo Marx, Gerry Mulligan, Josipa Lisac, Tom Barman and Guy Van Nueten, Rita Reys, Frankie Valli, and Barbra Streisand, amongst others.

== In popular culture ==
The Chet Baker and the Julie London versions of the song were credited in the 1981 film Sharky's Machine, which Burt Reynolds starred in and directed. Doc Severinsen produced the soundtrack for the film, along with Al Capps and Bob Florence.

In the 1999 Anthony Minghella film The Talented Mr. Ripley (based on a Patricia Highsmith novel), Matt Damon performs the song as the title character Tom Ripley.

The song was sampled on Kanye West’s song "Addiction" on his 2005 album Late Registration.

The song inspired the Italian designer Ettore Sottsass in his choice of a name for the Olivetti Valentine typewriter.

In the anime series Cowboy Bebop, Session 15 is named after this song. In this episode is revealed the backstory of the bounty hunter crew member Faye Valentine and is also revealed that her name comes from a song, probably meaning this one.

In Steel Ball Run, the name of the main antagonist, Funny Valentine, is a direct reference to this song. His Stand's ability to resurrect him when mortally wounded with a new physical body from an alternate self is another reference to the song's numerous covers.

In the 2012 Grey's Anatomy episode "Hope for the Hopeless", Richard Webber sings the song to his wife Adele Webber over the gallery intercom, after she has a Alzheimer’s flashback.

It is featured in the 2014 Chris Evans film Before We Go

In the 2018 Netflix series The Good Cop, the song's allegedly misogynistic lyrics are part of the plot in episode 6, "Did the TV Star Do It?" It is also a punchline at the end of the episode.

In 2022, a spider genus and species were named Funny valentine.

== See also ==
- List of 1930s jazz standards
