= The Song Is You (disambiguation) =

"The Song Is You" is a popular song from 1932 by Jerome Kern and Oscar Hammerstein II.

The Song Is You may also refer to:

- The Song Is You (Joe Williams album), 1965
- The Song Is You (Frank Sinatra album), 1994
- The Song Is You (Stan Getz album), 1996
- The Song Is You (Jennifer Holliday album), 2014
- The Song Is You, a 2009 novel by Arthur Phillips

== See also ==
- The Song Is June!, a 1958 album by June Christy which includes a cover version of "The Song Is You"
