= Miss Spectacular =

- Studio Recording
- Music: Jerry Herman
- Lyrics: Jerry Herman
- Book: Robert L. Freedman
- Productions: Unproduced

Miss Spectacular is an unproduced musical with a libretto by Robert L. Freedman, lyrics and music by Jerry Herman and additional lyrics by Steve Lawrence and Michael Feinstein. Its plot focuses on a girl from the Midwest who heads to Las Vegas and is a finalist in the "Miss Spectacular" contest.

== History ==
Steve Wynn had asked Herman to write a musical that would be presented at the Mirage Hotel in Las Vegas, possibly in 2000. Wynn planned to install the musical in its theater for a long-term engagement, but when the property was sold to MGM the new owners had no interest in the project.

In 2003, there were new plans for staging the musical in Las Vegas with Tommy Tune directing and the search for the leading lady done with a television talent show. There has been no further word on this project.

Undaunted by the collapse of the arrangement, Herman gathered together a cast of Broadway performers, including Lawrence, Feinstein, Faith Prince, Christine Baranski, Debbie Gravitte, and Karen Morrow, and a full orchestra to record a concept album that was released on the DRG label in 2002. His score is reminiscent of such early work as Hello, Dolly! and Mame.

== Song list ==
- "Overture"
- "Miss What's Her Name "
- "Las Vegas"
- "Ziegfeld Girl"
- "Sarah Jane"
- "Ziegfeld Girl (Reprise)"
- "Where in the World is My Prince?"
- "No Other Music"
- "I Wanna Live Each Night"
- "Miss Spectacular"
- "My Great Dream"
