= One Is a Lonesome Number =

Studio album by Joe Williams
- Released: 1963
- Genre: Jazz
- Length: 34:01
- Label: Roulette
- Producer: Teddy Reig

One Is a Lonesome Number is a 1963 studio album by jazz singer Joe Williams, produced by Teddy Reig. It was released on the Roulette Records record label.

== Track listing ==
1. "One Is a Lonesome Number" (Chuck Blore, Stan Hoffmann) - 2:38
2. "Cherry" (Ray Gilbert, Don Redman) - 3:21
3. "Poor You" (Burton Lane, E.Y. Harburg) - 3:00
4. "The Real Thing" (Ronald DeFeo, Lou Fields) - 2:50
5. "I Was Telling Her About You" (Don George, Morris Charlap) - 2:25
6. "All My Life" (Sam H. Stept, Sidney Mitchell) - 3:45
7. "(I've Got The) Cryin'est Shoulder in Town" (Irving Miller, Buddy Feyne, Milton Berle) - 2:37
8. "When She Makes Music" (Doris Fisher, Jack Segal) - 3:06
9. "Autumn Leaves" (Johnny Mercer, Joseph Kosma, Jacques Prevert) - 2:12
10. "Somebody" (Harry Warren, Jack Brooks) - 2:58
11. "Warmer than a Whisper" (Sammy Cahn, Jimmy Van Heusen) - 2:53
12. "I'm Just Taking My Time" (Adolph Green, Jule Styne, Betty Comden) - 2:16
