= In Good Company (Joe Williams album) =

Studio album by Joe Williams
- Released: 1989
- Genre: Vocal jazz
- Label: Verve

Joe Williams chronology
| Every Night: Live at Vine St. (1987) | In Good Company (1989) | That Holiday Feelin' (1990) |

In Good Company is an album by the American musician Joe Williams, released in 1989. It was nominated for a Grammy Award for "Best Jazz Vocal Performance, Male". Williams supported the album with a North American tour. In Good Company peaked in the top five of Billboard's Top Jazz Albums chart.

== Production ==
Williams duetted with Marlena Shaw on Louis Jordan's "Is You Is or Is You Ain't My Baby" and "Baby You Got What It Takes", the song made famous by Dinah Washington and Brook Benton. "Just Friends" is a version of the John Klenner and Sam M. Lewis song. Shirley Horn sang on "Too Good to Be True" and "Love Without Money". Williams was backed by Supersax on "Embraceable You" and "Just Friends". Henry Johnson played guitar on the album; Norman Simmons contributed on piano. Williams was still capable of moving through three vocal octaves.

== Critical reception ==
Professional ratings
Review scores
| Source | Rating |
|---|---|
| AllMusic | 4/5 stars |
| The Encyclopedia of Popular Music | 3/5 stars |

The Los Angeles Times praised "Williams's consistently potent sound." USA Today noted his "sinuous range and meaty bass." The Ottawa Citizen called the album "an engaging collection but not one that stands close scrutiny," but admired the version of "Ain't Got Nothing but the Blues". The Washington Post labeled it "one of the best jazz vocal albums of the year," writing that Williams "has lost a bit of his range and power, but ... he has honed his phrasing to such a sharp edge that the most familiar standard becomes a starkly personal statement." The Boston Globe said that Williams "carries the weight here with great style and polished grace."

AllMusic wrote that "Williams shows that at 70 he still had the magic."

== Track listing ==
| No. | Title | Length |
|---|---|---|
| 1. | "Just Friends" |
| 2. | "Baby You Got What It Takes" |
| 3. | "How Deep Is the Ocean" |
| 4. | "Love Without Money" |
| 5. | "Ain't Got Nothing but the Blues" |
| 6. | "Between the Devil and the Deep Blue Sea" |
| 7. | "Is You Is or Is You Ain't My Baby" |
| 8. | "Too Good to Be True" |
| 9. | "Embraceable You" |
| 10. | "Please Don't Talk About Me When I'm Gone" |
