= That Holiday Feelin' =

Studio album by Joe Williams
- Released: November 6, 1990
- Studio: Giant Studios, New York City, NY
- Genre: Christmas
- Length: 46:51
- Label: Verve
- Producer: Bob Porter

Joe Williams chronology
| In Good Company (1989) | That Holiday Feelin' (1990) | Ballad and Blues Master (live) (1992) |

Professional ratings
Review scores
| Source | Rating |
|---|---|
| AllMusic | 3/5 stars |
| Entertainment Weekly | A |

That Holiday Feelin' is a Christmas album by jazz singer, Joe Williams, released by Verve on November 6, 1990.

== Critical reception ==
Scott Yanow of AllMusic writes, "One of the better Christmas jazz sets, Joe Williams is heard in quartets and quintets with pianist Norman Simmons, in several tender duets with pianist Ellis Larkins." AllMusic rated the album 3 stars out of 5.

Ron Givens of Entertainment Weekly rates this album an "A" and writes, "From the world of jazz, singer Joe Williams has delivered a warm and cozy greeting card of an album with That Holiday Feelin’. His style is casual and relaxed, so effortlessly conversational that it feels like a chat with an old friend."

== Track listing ==
| No. | Title | Writer(s) | Length |
|---|---|---|---|
| 1. | "Christmas Rainbows" | Bill Wallace | 5:13 |
| 2. | "Winter Wonderland" | Richard B. Smith; Felix Bernard | 4:22 |
| 3. | "Have Yourself a Merry Little Christmas" | Hugh Martin; Ralph Blane | 4:38 |
| 4. | "What Are You Doing New Year's Eve?" | Frank Loesser | 3:56 |
| 5. | "Kissing By The Mistletoe" | John Leslie McFarland | 3:19 |
| 6. | "Silent Night" | Franz Gruber; Joseph Mohr | 2:46 |
| 7. | "Let It Snow! Let It Snow! Let It Snow!" | Jule Styne; Sammy Cahn | 4:36 |
| 8. | "Silver Bells" | Ray Evans; Jay Livingston | 3:04 |
| 9. | "Christmas Waltz" | Jule Styne; Sammy Cahn | 4:04 |
| 10. | "The Christmas Song" | Mel Tormé; Robert Wells | 4:42 |
| 11. | "A Child Is Born" | Alec Wilder; Thad Jones | 6:11 |
| Total length: | | | 46:51 |

== Musicians ==
- Joe Williams – vocals
- Kenny Burrell – acoustic guitar (track 10), electric guitar (tracks 2, 3, 7)
- Bobby Watson – alto saxophone (tracks 2, 3, 5, 7, 9)
- Seldon Powell – baritone saxophone (tracks 2, 3, 5, 7, 9)
- Bob Cranshaw – bass guitar (tracks 1, 2, 7, 10)
- Paul West – bass guitar (tracks 3, 5, 9, 11)
- Dennis Mackrel – drums (tracks 1 to 3, 5, 7 to 11)
- Ted Dunbar – electric guitar (tracks 3, 5, 9, 11)
- Ellis Larkins – piano (tracks 4, 6, 8)
- Norman Simmons – piano (tracks 1 to 3, 5, 7, 9 to 11)
- Frank Wess – tenor saxophone (tracks 2, 3, 5, 7, 9)
- Al Grey – trombone (tracks 2, 3, 5, 7, 9)
- Clark Terry – trumpet (tracks 2, 3, 5, 7, 9)
- Joe Wilder – trumpet (tracks 2, 3, 5, 7, 9)

== Production ==
- Executive producer – Richard Seidel
- Producer – Bob Porter
- Product Manager – Sheila Mathis
- Recorded by Malcolm Addey
- Recorded by (Assistant) – Ron Allaire
- Arranged by Joe Williams, Norman Simmons
- Horns arranged by Bobby Watson (tracks 2, 3, 5, 7, 9)
