= Simone Griffeth =

American actress

- Born: April 4, 1950 (age 76); Savannah, Georgia, U.S.
- Other name: Simone Griffeth-McDonald
- Occupation: Actress
- Years active: 1971–present
- Spouse(s): Wayne McDonald (m. 19??)

Simone Griffeth (born April 4, 1950), sometimes credited under her married name Simone Griffeth-McDonald, is an American actress. She was a Theater Arts major at the University of South Carolina for three years. While attending college Simone acted in a weekly children's show for a Columbia television station. She appeared in a TV commercial at age 15.

== Life and career ==
The tall, blonde Griffeth was born in Savannah, Georgia. She made her film debut as the titular sweet innocent country girl in the redneck country exploitation film Swamp Girl (1971). She then went on to star in a number of movies in the 1970s, followed by numerous recurring roles in many prime-time TV series through the early 1980s, including her role of serious minded reporter Gretchen on Ladies' Man (1980–81) and as Beatrice Arthur's spoiled daughter-in-law Arlene on Amanda's (1983). Griffeth reunited with her former Ladies Man co-star Herb Edelman in an episode of The Golden Girls, playing Stan Zbornak's second wife, Chrissy. In 2017, Simone began a comeback by portraying a hard-nosed, matriarch of a renowned, Savannah, Georgia law firm in the crime-drama, Untouched. She continues to coach actors in the Hilton Head area.

Among the TV shows Griffeth has done guest spots on are Hawaii Five-O, The Six Million Dollar Man, Starsky and Hutch, The Incredible Hulk, The Dukes of Hazzard, Three's Company, The Greatest American Hero, Hart to Hart, Buffalo Bill, T.J. Hooker, Magnum, P.I., Riptide, The Golden Girls, Bret Maverick and Silk Stalkings.

Currently, while between acting jobs, she works as a real estate agent for high-end Low Country properties, together with husband Wayne McDonald.

== Selected filmography ==
Year	Title	Role	Notes
1971	Swamp Girl	Janeen	
1973	Sixteen	Naomi Irtley	
1974	Only with Married Men	Tina	
1975	Death Race 2000	Annie Smith	Originally billed above Sylvester Stallone
1976	Monster Squad	Bonnie Bon	
1979	Mandrake	Stacy	Television film
1979	Hawaii Five-O	Gerry Colby	Episode: "A Very Personal Matter"
1980	Hart to Hart	Pamela Granville	Episode: 1*20 Cruise At Your Own Risk
1980	Fighting Back: The Rocky Bleier Story	Marcy	TV film
1980	Ladies' Man	Gretchen	
1981	Delusion	Pamela Barton	Also known as The House Where Death Lives
1981	Bret Maverick: Faith, Hope and Clarity	Jasmine DuBois	
1983	Amanda's	Arlene Cartwright	
1983	Buffalo Bill	Tamara Brooks	
1985	Hot Target	Christine Webber	
1998	The New Swiss Family Robinson	Cynthia	
2013	10 Rules for Sleeping Around	Barbara	
2013	Savannah	Mrs. Stubbs	
2017	Untouched	Eleanor Thomas	
2017	In Search of Liberty	Charlene Murray	
