= Sings Everyday =

Studio album by Joe Williams
- Released: December 1956
- Recorded: 1951–1952
- Genre: Jazz
- Length: 27:45
- Label: Regent Record Co. Inc.
- Producer: Ozzie Cadena

Sings Everyday is a 1956 studio album by jazz singer Joe Williams, produced by Ozzie Cadena and arranged by Sun Ra. It was released by Regent Record Co. Inc. (LP vinyl) and London Records (10" vinyl).

== Track listing ==
1. "It's Raining Again" - 2:47
2. "Detour Ahead" (Lou Carter, Herb Ellis, John Freigo) - 3:00
3. "Every Day I Have the Blues" (Peter Chatman, Rick Davies, Roger Hodgson) - 2:40
4. "They Didn't Believe Me" (Lou Carter, Herb Ellis, Johnny Frigo, Jerome Kern, Michael E. Rourke) - 2:46
5. "Blow Mr. Low" - 2:53
6. "Time for Moving" (traditional) - 2:25
7. "When the Sun Goes Down" (Leroy Carr, Jerome Kern) - 3:09
8. "Kansas City Blues" (Count Basie, Peter Chatman) - 3:03
9. "Always on the Blue Side" - 3:05
10. "Safe, Sane and Single" (Hy Heath, Louis Jordan, John Lange) - 2:26
