= Ladies' Man (1980 TV series) =

- Genre: Sitcom
- Starring: Lawrence Pressman; Natasha Ryan; Karen Morrow; Simone Griffeth
- Composer: Jack Elliott
- Country of origin: United States
- Original language: English
- No. of seasons: 1
- No. of episodes: 16 (1 unaired)

Production
- Executive producer: Herbert B. Leonard
- Producer: Michael Loman
- Running time: 30 minutes
- Production companies: Herbert B. Leonard Productions; 20th Century Fox Television

Original release
- Network: CBS
- Release: October 27, 1980 – February 21, 1981

Ladies' Man is an American sitcom starring Lawrence Pressman as a divorced male working at a women's magazine. The series premiered October 27, 1980, on CBS. The program also stars Louise Sorel and her former husband, Herbert Edelman. The show was written by Anne Convy and Carmen Finestra. The series did not do well in the ratings and was canceled after one season.

== Synopsis ==
Divorced Alan Thackeray (Pressman) was a single father of daughter Amy (Natasha Ryan) and was completely surrounded by women. At home, with good advice on how to raise Amy (and to provide her with a motherly figure in her life, in lieu of her real mother), was his cheerful and friendly next-door neighbor, Betty Brill (Karen Morrow).

At Women's Life magazine, the magazine he worked at as a feature writer, he was also surrounded by women. The staff included fellow columnists: serious minded researcher Gretchen (Simone Griffeth); Susan (Allison Argo), a militant feminist; and romantic minded reporter Andrea Gibbons (Betty Kennedy); and all were supervised by the magazine's hard-to-please and somewhat dominating editor, Elaine Holstein (Sorel). The only other male at Women's Life, aside from Alan, was the harried accountant, Reggie (Edelman).

Situations dealing with his homelife and work life, which was completely surrounded by women was the main premise of the series.

== Cast ==
- Lawrence Pressman as Alan Thackeray
- Natasha Ryan as Amy Thackeray
- Karen Morrow as Betty Brill
- Simone Griffeth as Gretchen
- Allison Argo as Susan
- Betty Kennedy as Andrea Gibbons
- Herbert Edelman as Reggie
- Louise Sorel as Elaine Holstein

== Episodes ==
No.	Title	Original release date
1	"Pilot"	October 27, 1980
2	"Play It Again, Alan"	November 3, 1980
3	"Gretchen's Problem"	November 10, 1980
4	"Amy's Fear"	November 17, 1980
5	"An Obtuse Triangle"	December 1, 1980
6	"The Mugger"	December 8, 1980
Historical note: The west-coast feed of this episode was interrupted near its end by a CBS News bulletin which announced John Lennon had been shot.
7	"Holstein's Affair"	December 10, 1980
8	"Alan's Infidelity Column"	December 22, 1980
9	"Andrea's Crush"	January 5, 1981
10	"Alan's Money Problem"	January 12, 1981
11	"Susan the Playwright"	January 19, 1981
12	"Think Young, Ladies"	January 26, 1981
13	"Women Need Not Apply"	February 7, 1981
14	"Games: Part 1"	February 14, 1981
15	"Games: Part 2"	February 21, 1981
16	"The Committee"	Unaired
