= The Song Is You (Joe Williams album) =

Studio album by Joe Williams
- Released: 1965
- Genre: Jazz
- Length: 36:33
- Label: RCA Victor
- Producer: George Avakian; Jack Lewis

The Song Is You is a 1965 studio album by jazz singer Joe Williams, produced by George Avakian and Jack Lewis, and arranged and composed by Frank Hunter. It was released on vinyl on the RCA Victor label. The album was also paired with another album by Joe Williams, Me and the Blues, released in 1997 on CD.

== Track listing ==
1. "Yours Is My Heart Alone" (Ludwig Herzer, Franz Lehár, Beda Fritz Loehner) - 3:25
2. "I'll Follow You" (Fred E. Ahlert, Roy Turk) - 3:07
3. "Sleepy Time Gal" (Joseph Reed Alden, Raymond B. Egan, Ange Lorenzo, Richard A. Whiting) - 2:38
4. "The Song Is You" (Oscar Hammerstein II, Jerome Kern) - 3:15
5. "Prelude to a Kiss" (Duke Ellington, Irving Gordon, Irving Mills) - 3:20
6. "(I Wanna Go Where You Go, Do What You Do) Then I'll Be Happy" (Lew Brown, Sidney Clare, Cliff Friend) - 2:53
7. "People" (Bob Merrill, Jule Styne) - 2:51
8. "I'm a Fool to Want You" (Joel Herron, Frank Sinatra, Jack Wolf) - 3:50
9. "That Face" (Alan Bergman, Lew Spence) - 2:46
10. "My Darling" (Edward Heyman) - 2:40
11. "My Romance" (Lorenz Hart, Richard Rodgers) - 3:08
12. "You Stepped Out of a Dream" (Nacio Herb Brown, Gus Kahn) - 2:40
