= The Urban Gorilla =

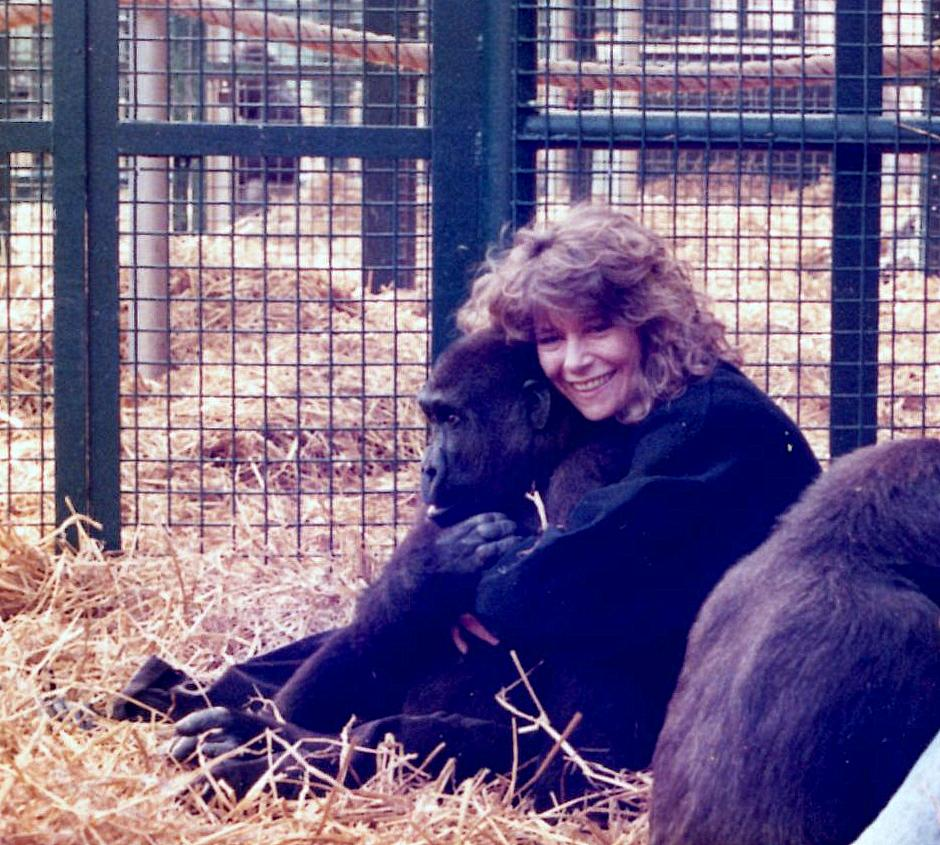
Director/producer Allison Argo on the set of The Urban Gorilla

The Urban Gorilla is a 1991 documentary television film from National Geographic Explorer and ArgoFilms. The film explores the lives of gorillas in an urban environment. The Urban Gorilla was narrated by Glenn Close and shot by Robert Collins. The film was directed, produced, and written by Allison Argo. This was the first film that Argo produced. The film was directly inspired by a gorilla named Ivan, who is featured in the documentary.

The Urban Gorilla was nominated for two national Emmys and won duPont Columbia Award for journalism, Genesis Award, Christopher Columbus Award, and Worldfest Houston. The film also received the first Best Newcomer Award from the Jackson Hole Wildlife Film Festival. Ivan, the gorilla featured in The Urban Gorilla was also written about in the children's novel The One And Only Ivan by Katherine Applegate.
