= High Ice (film) =

- Genre: Adventure; thriller
- Written by: Sy Gomberg; Jack Turley
- Directed by: Eugene S. Jones
- Starring: David Janssen; Tony Musante; Madge Sinclair; Gretchen Corbett
- Music by: Robert O. Ragland
- Country of origin: United States
- Original language: English

Production
- Producers: Eugene S. Jones; Natalie Jones
- Cinematography: Robert E. Collins
- Editor: George Hively
- Running time: 97 minutes
- Budget: $2 million

Original release
- Network: NBC
- Release: January 7, 1980

High Ice, also known as Challenge of the High Ice, is a 1980 American adventure television film directed by Eugene S. Jones and starring David Janssen, Tony Musante, Madge Sinclair, and Gretchen Corbett. Its plot follows a park ranger and army lieutenant attempting to save three rock climbers stranded on a mountain ledge. The film was released in the United States as an NBC Movie of the Week in early 1980, but was given a theatrical release internationally. The extended theatrical cut of the film shown in foreign countries includes nude sequences that were excised from the television version.

== Premise ==
A park ranger (David Janssen) clashes with an army lieutenant colonel (Tony Musante) regarding the rescue efforts of three rock climbers stranded on a mountain ledge in Washington.

== Cast ==
- David Janssen as Glencoe MacDonald
- Tony Musante as Lt. Col. Harris Thatcher
- Madge Sinclair as Dr. Pittman
- Gretchen Corbett as Liz
- James G. Richardson as Scott
- Allison Argo as Kathy
- Dorian Harewood as Lt. Zack Hawkins
- Warren Stevens as Sgt. Lomax
- Katherine Cannon as Sandy
- James Canning as Lt. Foster
- James Kaufman as Lt. Foley

== Production ==
Filming took place in Darrington, Washington in the summer of 1979. The production budget was approximately $2 million.

== Release ==
Upon its airing on NBC in January 1980, High Ice was met by approximately 25 million viewers in the United States. The film was subsequently given a theatrical release internationally, with nudity which had been cut from the television version reinstated. The film aired on television again in the late 1980s on MTV.

=== Critical response ===
James Brown of the Los Angeles Times deemed the film a "visually breathtaking, but dramatically stuttering diversion... Director Eugene Jones further hampers his own cause with some choppy transitions, confusing flashbacks and muddled dramatic focus."
