= Friends (1979 TV series) =

1979 American children's television series

- Written by: AJ Carothers; Liz Coe; Michael Russnow; April Smith
- Directed by: Roger Duchowny; Glenn Jordan; Arnold Laven; James Sheldon; George Tyne
- Starring: Charlie Aiken; Jarrod Johnson; Janet MacLachlan; Karen Morrow; Roger Robinson; Andy Romano; Jill Whelan
- Country of origin: United States
- Original language: English
- No. of episodes: 5

Production
- Executive producers: Aaron Spelling; Douglas S. Cramer
- Producers: Cindy Dunne; Bo Kaprall; Bob Sand; Glenn Jordan; Cindy Levin
- Running time: 60 minutes
- Production company: Aaron Spelling Productions

Original release
- Network: ABC
- Release: March 25 – April 22, 1979

Friends is an American children-oriented comedy-drama series that aired on ABC from March 25 to April 22, 1979. The series, which was produced by Aaron Spelling, starred Charlie Aiken, Jill Whelan, Janet MacLachlan, Jarrod Johnson, Karen Morrow and Roger Robinson.

Five one-hour episodes were produced before the series was cancelled.

== Overview ==
A comedy-drama series as seen through the eyes of three 11-year-old children from different backgrounds with episodes focusing upon the trials and tribulations of adolescence, and involved subjects such as dating, family, school, growing pains and friendship.

== Cast ==
- Charlie Aiken as Pete Richards
- Jarrod Johnson as Randy Summerfield
- Janet MacLachlan as Jane Summerfield
- Karen Morrow as Pamela Richards
- Roger Robinson as Warren Summerfield
- Andy Romano as Frank Richards
- Jill Whelan as Nancy Wilks

== Episodes ==
No.	Title	Original release date	Filming order
1	"Going Out"	March 25, 1979	101
2	"Pilot"	April 1, 1979	100
3	"Grandfather Arrives"	April 8, 1979	104
4	"Pressure"	April 15, 1979	102
5	"A Case of Bad Timing"	April 22, 1979	103

== Bibliography ==
- Tim Brooks and Earle Marsh, The Complete Directory to Prime Time Network and Cable TV Shows 1946–Present, Ninth edition (New York: Ballantine Books, 2007) ISBN 978-0-345-49773-4
