= Just the Blues =

Studio album by Count Basie and Joe Williams
- Released: October 1960
- Genre: Jazz, blues
- Length: 39:02
- Label: Roulette Records
- Producer: Teddy Reig

Just the Blues is a 1960 studio album by jazz singer Joe Williams, produced by Teddy Reig, and arranged and conducted by the Count Basie Orchestra. It was the eighth album Williams recorded with the Count Basie band. It was released on LP vinyl by Roulette Records. It features a collection of blues songs, with the exception of one song, the torch song "Trav'lin' Light". The album includes one song with original lyrics by Williams, "Lyin' Woman". Just the Blues was later included in a compilation album featuring four albums by Joe Williams with the Count Basie Orchestra: A Night at Count Basie's / A Man Ain't Supposed to Cry / Everyday I Have the Blues / Just the Blues.

== Reception ==
Just the Blues received positive reviews, with AllMusic stating "The chemistry between the band and the singer is impeccable, as always, with Basie's economical piano adding just the right touch when needed, and Williams is in great voice". The album was praised for its new spin on songs such as Walter Brown's "Confessin' the Blues" and Leroy Carr's "Night Time Is the Right Time".

== Track listing ==
1. "Confessin' the Blues" (Jay McShann, Walter Brown) - 3:59
2. "Mean Old World" (William "Big Bill" Broonzy) - 4:40
3. "Trav'lin' Light" (Jimmy Mundy, Trummy Young, Johnny Mercer) - 3:53
4. "Key to the Highway" (William "Big Bill" Broonzy, Charles Segar) - 2:52
5. "Lyin' Woman" (Joe Williams) - 3:09
6. "Chains of Love" (Ahmet Ertegun) - 3:31
7. "Mean Mistreater" (James Gordon) - 3:49
8. "Keep Your Hand on Your Heart" (William "Big Bill" Broonzy) - 3:22
9. "Night Time is the Right Time (When the Sun Goes Down)" (Leroy Carr) - 6:05
10. "Tomorrow Night" (Sam Coslow, Walter Gross) - 3:26
