= Swamp Girl =

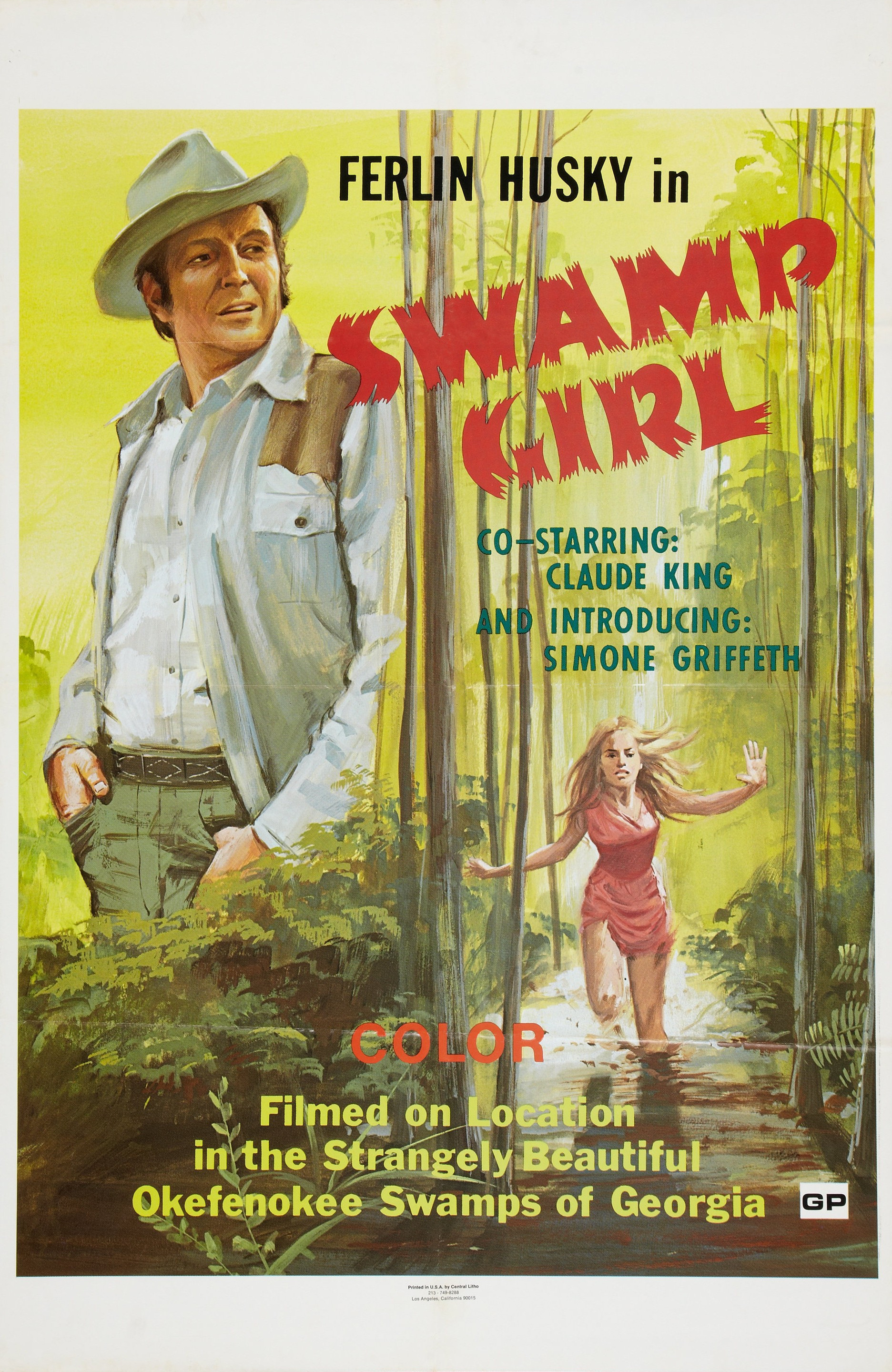
- Theatrical release poster
- Directed by: Don Davis
- Screenplay by: Jay Kulp
- Based on: original story by Jack Vaughn; Jay Kulp
- Produced by: Jay Kulp; Don Davis; Jack Vaughn
- Starring: Ferlin Husky; Claude King; Steve Drexel; Lonnie Bower; Introducing Simone Griffeth
- Cinematography: Jay Kulp
- Edited by: Ronald R. Johnson
- Music by: Gene Kauer; Doug Lackey
- Production companies: Donald A. Davis Productions, Inc.
- Release date: 1971
- Running time: 78 minutes
- Country: United States
- Language: English

Swamp Girl is a 1971 American backcountry drama film, independently made on a low budget in Georgia by Donald A. Davis Productions, Inc., co-produced and co-written by Don Davis (who also directed), Jack Vaughn (who also plays a cameo role) and Jay Kulp (who was also the cinematographer and died in the aftermath of a jeep accident near the end of production). The sole name billed before the title is that of country singer Ferlin Husky, with second billing going to country singer-songwriter Claude King. The title role is played by Georgia native Simone Griffeth who receives an "Introducing" credit in her film debut.

The film's general release was in November 1971, but the location of the premiere, in June, was the small Georgia city of Waycross, the closest city to the Okefenokee Swamp. The opening credits state, "Swamp locations courtesy of Okefenokee Swamp Park Waycross, Georgia" and "Okefenokee Wildlife Refuge U.S. Dept. of Interior Folkston, Georgia".

== Plot ==
Janeen, a young girl living in Georgia's Okefenokee Swamp near the small city of Waycross, helps park ranger Jim when his foot is caught in a poachers' trap and learns to trust him. Her home is a swamp cabin which she shares with a middle-aged African American whom she calls Pa. When she tells him about meeting ranger Jim, Pa reveals details about her past — his own name is Nat and several years ago he lived with and assisted an old doctor who saved his life. Doc had an abortion clinic, but also delivered unwanted babies and sold them to agents of Arab sheiks as sex slaves. Janeen was one of such babies, and lived with Doc and Nat until she was about six, when Doc decided she could be sold for a high price, but the two slavers who arrived for her refused to pay, killed Doc, and took Janeen. Nat, who suspected that Doc intended to sell her, hid nearby, used a hatchet to kill the slavers and, afraid of the law, retreated with Janeen to the swamp.

As Janeen says goodbye to Pa/Nat and goes to meet Jim, escaped convict Carol Martin and her boyfriend Steve arrive at the cabin and kill Nat with the last bullet in their shotgun. Hearing the shot, Janeen turns back and, as she enters and sees Nat's body, is taken prisoner by the couple who force her to lead them out of the swamp. Meanwhile, after waiting for Janeen's return, ranger Jim returns to Waycross where is informed by county sheriff Ben that Carol's boyfriend broke her out of the women's prison farm and, during the break, she fatally shot a guard. Carol's parents, Gifford and Ella, also arrive in the city with plans to aid Carol, hiring disreputable locals Denton Cole, Hank and Jesse as guides. Learning about the Martins' plan, Jim and Ben set out in a swamp airboat to explore the area. At the same time, as Janeen is prodded through the swamp by the fugitive couple, her anger at Nat's murder and realization that the newcomers are at a loss in the watery wilderness, leads her to guide them towards a quicksand pit and, as Steve is sucked in, Carol runs and falls into alligator infested waters.

Carol's final screams are heard by her father and his three guides who arrive there at the same time. Spotting Janeen and shouting that she caused his daughter's death, Gifford Martin shoots at her and, as Jim and Ben hear the shot and head toward him, runs into dense growth, while engaging in a shootout with Ben. Wounded by Ben, he falls into a nest of venomous snakes. Janeen, who fell to the ground after Martin's shot, was stunned by the impact, but not wounded. She boards the airboat along with Jim, Ben, Denton, Hank and Jesse, as they take Martin's body to his wife.

As Ella Martin cries out her grief upon seeing Gifford's bloodied corpse, Denton Cole tells her that Carol is also dead, "the swamp girl, there, fed her to a big gator". As Ella shouts, "I'll kill you", she hears the swamp girl addressed as Janeen, her own mother's name, and ruefully says that "my own daughter comes back to kill my husband and my daughter". She explains that Janeen's father died in the war and that her own father wanted to kill her for bringing shame upon the family. Her only hope lay with the old Doc who ran the abortion clinic and was known to arrange adoptions with good families. She asks Janeen to come live with her as her only remaining family, but Janeen tells her, "I'm going home" and returns to the swamp, with the possibility that she may decide to rejoin civilization in the future.

== Cast ==
- Ferlin Husky.........Jim Waters, ranger assigned to the Swamp Park
- Also Starring Claude King.........Ben Cutler, the county sheriff
- Steve Drexel.........Steve, boyfriend of escaped convict Carol Martin
- Lonnie Bower.........Nat, known to swamp girl Janeen as "Pa"
- With Donna Stanley.........Carol Martin, escaped convict
- Joyce Lee.........Ella Martin, mother of Carol as well as Janeen
- Robert Corley.........Denton Cole, illegal fisherman
- Stuart Culpepper.........Eafe Turner, snake farm owner who is thrown into snake pit by Denton Cole, Hank and Jesse
- Gerald Hurd.........Hank, illegal fisherman
- Bill Chap.........Jesse, illegal fisherman
- Byrd Holland [also receives credit for make-up].........Doc, the old abortion doctor (in Nat's flashback)

- With Richard Conrad.........Gifford Martin, father of escaped convict Carol
- Glenn Gray.........Tom, sheriff Cutler's deputy
- Robert Neeson Sr..........Doctor who examines Gifford Martin's body and pronounces him dead
- Robin Vaughn.........Janeen, the swamp girl at a young age (in Nat's flashback)
- Donald Murphy.........Surly
- Ron Johnson [also receives credit as editor and production manager].........Burly
- With Jack Vaughn.........Dying man brought out of the swamp by Janeen
- Margaret Mora.........Local woman
- Ann Myers [also receives credit as production assistant and script girl].........Local woman
- Chris Mathis.........Local woman
- Sharon Cisneros.........Local woman
- Annette Vaughn.........Local woman
- Introducing Simone Griffeth.........Janeen, the swamp girl

== Song ==
"Swamp Girl" by John Owen [also receives credit as talent coordinator]

== DVD release ==
In 2002 Swamp Girl was released on a double feature DVD with 1966's Swamp Country.

== See also ==
- List of American films of 1971
