= Have a Good Time with Joe Williams =

Studio album by Joe Williams
- Released: October 16, 1961
- Genre: Jazz
- Length: 54:24
- Label: Roulette
- Producer: Teddy Reig

Professional ratings
Review scores
Source	Rating
Billboard	favorable (Spotlight pick)

Professional ratings
Together / Have a Good Time (CD reissue)
Review scores
Source	Rating
AllMusic	3/5 stars

Have a Good Time with Joe Williams is a studio album recorded by Joe Williams, produced by Teddy Reig, and arranged by Ernie Wilkins and his orchestra. It was released on Roulette Records on October 16, 1961. Have a Good Time with Joe Williams was released as a compilation album, paired with Together, another album recorded by Williams and released in 2001.

== Track listing ==
1. "Have a Good Time" (Boudleaux & Felice Bryant) - 2:52
2. "Sometimes I'm Happy" (Vincent Youmans) - 2:45
3. "Old Folks" (Dedette Lee Hill, Willard Robinson) - 2:55
4. "Until I Met You (Corner Pocket)" (Don Wolf, Freddie Green) - 2:50
5. "I Won't Cry Anymore" (Al Frisch, Fred Wise) - 3:18
6. " 'Sposin" (Andy Razzaf, Paul Denniker) - 2:22
7. "A Blues Serenade" (Frank Signorelli, Mitchell Parish) - 2:59
8. "September in the Rain" (Al Dubin, Harry Warren) - 2:12
9. "Summertime" (DuBose Heyward, George Gershwin) - 2:37
10. "Moonlight in Vermont" (John Blackburn, Karl Suessdorf) - 2:17
11. "Falling in Love with Love" (Richard Rodgers) - 2:34
