= With Songs About That Kind of Woman =

Studio album by Joe Williams
- Released: February 1960
- Genre: Jazz, pop
- Length: 34:16
- Label: Roulette Records, Columbia Records, Forum Circle
- Producer: Teddy Reig

With Songs About That Kind of Woman (also known as "That Kind of Woman") is a 1960 studio album by jazz singer Joe Williams, produced by Teddy Reig and arranged/conducted by Jimmy Jones. It was released on Roulette Records and Forum Circle in the U.S. and Columbia Records in the U.K.

== Reception ==
Professional ratings
Review scores
Source	Rating
down beat	4/5 stars
AllMusic	3/5 stars

Among others, the album was reviewed in HiFi/Stereo Review, The Jazz Review, DownBeat and The Cash Box.

HiFi/Stereo Review offered a mixed review of the album, praising Williams for performing the standards with "an ungimmicked, direct warmth and intelligent attention to what the lyrics actually say", but complaining "his ballad work lacks that extra element of spark and musical personality [...] that differentiates Jack Teagarden, let's say, from Joe Williams".

== Track listing ==
1. "That Kind of Woman" (Bacharach and David) - 2:39
2. "Candy" (Joan Whitney, Mack David, Alex Kramer) - 2:53
3. "You Think of Everything" (Jimmy Van Heusen, Thomas Joseph McCarthy) - 3:41
4. "Stella by Starlight" (Victor Young) - 3:35
5. "Louise" (Leo Robin, Richard Whiting) - 2:20
6. "It's Easy to Remember" (Richard Rodgers, Lorenz Hart) - 2:53
7. "I Only Want to Love You" (Harold Spina, Jack Elliot) - 2:51
8. "Cherry" (Don Redman, Ray Gilbert) - 3:14
9. "Why Can't You Behave" (Cole Porter) - 3:08
10. "Here's To My Lady" (Johnny Mercer, Rube Bloom) - 2:56
11. "When a Woman Loves a Man" (Billy Rose, Ralph Rainger) - 2:32
12. "Have You Met Miss Jones" (Richard Rodgers, Lorenz Hart) - 1:58
