= Allison Argo =

American film director

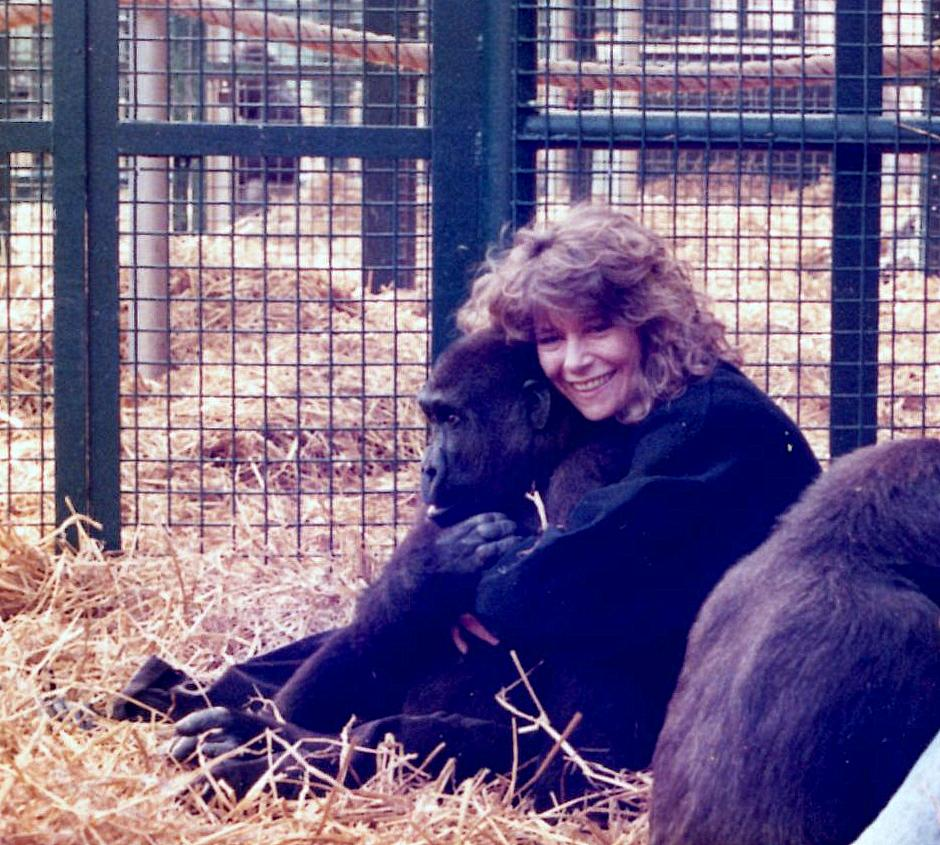
- Argo with Gorilla in 1990
- Born: December 23, 1953 (age 72); Richmond, Virginia
- Occupations: Film producer; film director; writer; editor; narrator
- Years active: 1975-present
- Awards: 1 duPont-Columbia; 6 Emmy; 4 Genesis; 4 Christopher Columbus
- Website: www.argofilms.com

Allison Argo (born December 23, 1953) is an American film producer, director, writer, editor, and narrator. She is best known for her documentaries that focus on endangered wildlife and conservation. Her films have received awards including six National Emmy Awards. and the duPont-Columbia Award for journalism.

In her early career as an actress, Argo performed on Broadway, in television, and in film. Her theatre roles included work as an original cast member in two Broadway theatre productions, and her work in television and film included roles in television movies and a major role in a TV series, along with recurring roles in two soap operas.

In 1989, while on location in the state of Washington, Argo happened upon a gorilla caged as an exhibit in a shopping mall. This experience led Argo to produce and direct her first film, The Urban Gorilla (National Geographic 1992), about the lives of captive gorillas. Argo received the duPont-Columbia award for the documentary. Since that time, Argo has dedicated her work towards advocating for the welfare and understanding of wild animals through documentary films and public speaking engagements.

With her production company, ArgoFilms, LTD, Argo has produced eighteen films. Among others, notable award-winning films have included Keepers of the Wild (National Geographic and PBS 1992), The Last Frog (National Geographic 1996), The Secret Life of Cats (National Geographic 1999), The Urban Elephant (National Geographic and PBS NATURE 2000), Chimpanzees: An Unnatural History (PBS NATURE 2006), Crash: a Tale of Two Species (PBS NATURE 2008), and Parrot Confidential (PBS NATURE 2013), The Last Pig (2017).

== Early life ==
Argo was raised on Cape Cod as one of two daughters of Gordon Harold Argo (06/22/1924–07/10/2003) and Elizabeth "Betsy" Argo (née Brunk; 1922–2016), both actors. The Argos owned and operated the Orleans Arena Theater, America's first summer stock theater-in-the-round, in the town of Orleans, Massachusetts. From childhood, she was immersed in theater and the world of drama, which prepared her for a career as a professional actress in New York and Los Angeles.

== Career as an actress ==
On Broadway, Argo played major roles as an original cast member in the revivals of Ibsen's The Lady from the Sea (1976), and Tennessee Williams’ The Night of the Iguana (1976–1977), and she appeared in the musical Grease. She played a leading role on the CBS television series Ladies Man and was featured on WKRP in Cincinnati, as well as on ten television movies and pilots. Argo played recurring roles on the soap operas Search for Tomorrow and The Bold and the Beautiful. She also voiced cartoon characters, including the character Andrea in the Cathy animated television specials.

== ArgoFilms ==
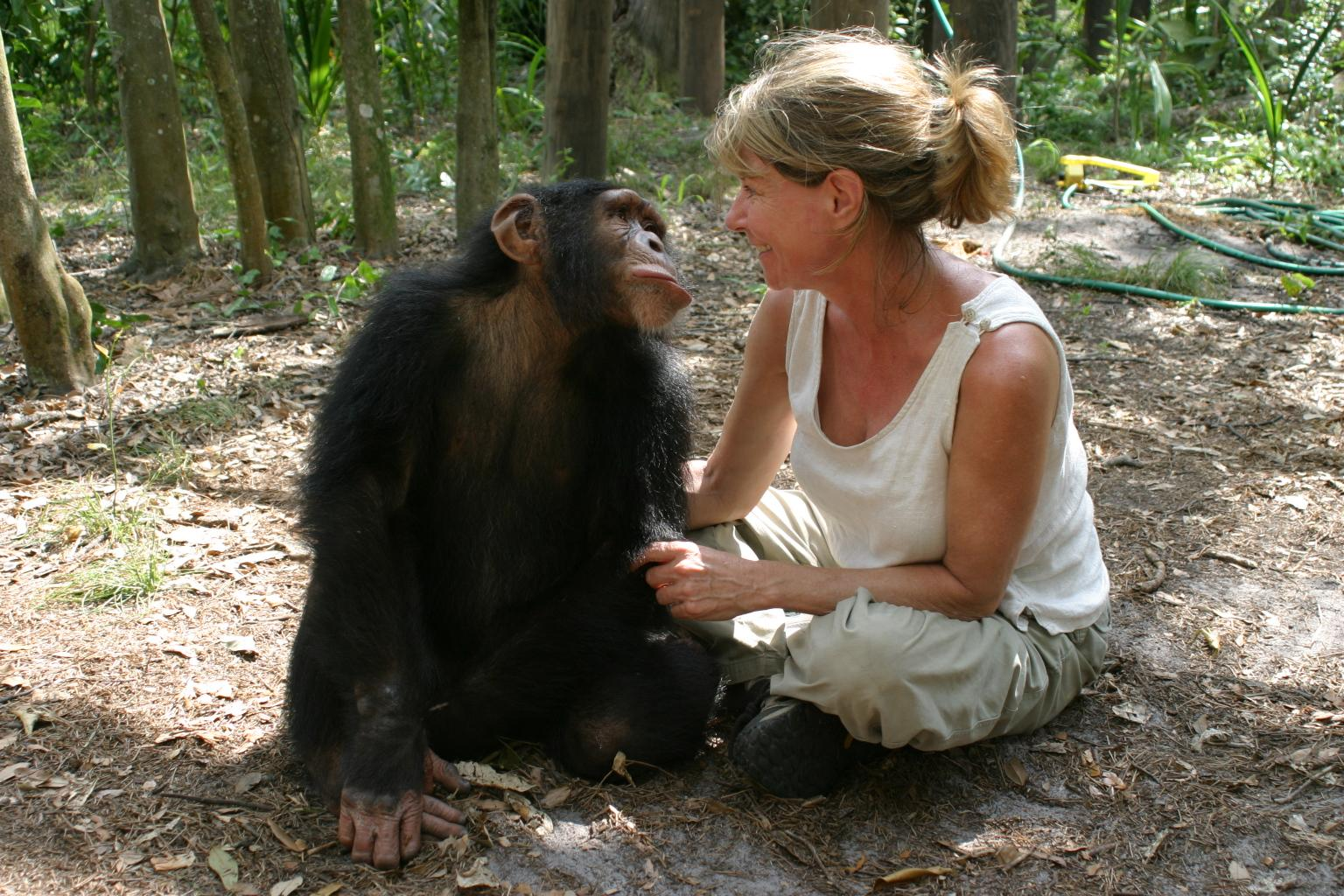
Allison Argo on location filming Chimpanzees, An Unnatural History in 2006

Argo's experience seeing the gorilla, Ivan, isolated and on display in an enclosure comprising two concrete rooms in a shopping mall was the catalyst for her forming ArgoFilms, LTD. Concerned about gorillas in similar situations as Ivan's, Argo made them the subject of her first film The Urban Gorilla, which in addition to the duPont-Columbia award was the recipient of two Emmy nominations.

Since The Urban Gorilla, ArgoFilms has gone on to advocate for, among others, frogs, snakes, cats, elephants, chimpanzees, and birds. One film has documented the effects of the September 11 attacks upon people. The Story of Dao, about a street elephant named Pang Dao, has been in pre-production since 2011. A scout (research expedition) was completed in Thailand in 2012.

ArgoFilms has produced eighteen documentaries for National Geographic, PBS, and the NATURE series. Allison Argo has either produced, directed, or written all films. Glenn Close narrated the first two films; and Argo has narrated since. The films have garnered twelve Emmy nominations, with six Emmys having been won in various categories including two for directing. Additionally, ArgoFilms has been awarded four Genesis Awards, most recently in 2014 for the film Parrot Confidential ( PBS NATURE 2013), and has also been recognized by the Missoula, Jackson Hole, and Japan Wildlife Film Festivals. In Parrot Confidential, the circumstances of parrots in captivity who often outlive their owners and suffer as a result are explored. The subject had received little documentation until the film was produced.

In an April 2014 article in a Cape Cod periodical, Argo has said that the most satisfying aspect of her work is when it makes a difference. Her goal is to open eyes; and if people are given the facts, they will do what they can to improve life. The work of ArgoFilms is meant to "foster compassion for animals and to champion wildlife through film, providing a voice for those who have none."

== Stage acting credits (Broadway) ==
Year	Title	Role	Notes
1975	Grease	Patty Simcox	replacement
1976	The Lady From the Sea (Revival)	Hilda	original cast member
1976-'77	The Night of the Iguana (Revival)	Charlotte Goodall	original cast member

== Television acting credits ==
Year	Title	Production Type	Role	Notes
1976, '77	Search For Tomorrow	TV series	Cindy French	
1977	Between the Lines	film	dancer	
1979	The Gift	TV movie	Kathleen	
1980	WKRP in Cincinnati	TV series	Carol Travis	Episode 36 "A Family Affair"
1980	High Ice	TV movie	Kathy	
1980	Casino	TV movie	Angie Taylor	
1980	The Return of Frank Cannon	TV movie	Jessica Bingham	
1980, '81	Ladies' Man	TV series	Susan	Major role, appeared in all 16 episodes
1983	An Uncommon Love	TV movie	Arvetta	
1984	Legmen	TV series	Linda	"I Shall be Re-Released"
1984	The Paper Chase	TV series	Unnamed	Season 2, Episode 8 "Mrs. Hart"
1985	Cry From the Mountain	Feature film	Laurie Matthews	Argo's first feature film
1986	Club Med	TV movie	Allison	
1987	The Bronx Zoo	TV series	Mrs. McKaren	“Conspicuous by Their Abstinence”, “Changes”
1987	Cathy	TV movie	Andrea (voice)	Argo's first animated film
1987	The Bold and the Beautiful	TV series	Robin West	“Episode #1.153”, “Episode #1.151”, “Episode #1.144”
1988	Family Medical Center	TV series	Unnamed	
1988	Cathy’s Last Resort	TV movie	Andrea (voice)	
1989	Vytor: The Starfire Champion	TV movie	Baboose (voice)	
1989	Cathy’s Valentine	TV movie	Andrea (voice)	
1991	Star Street: The Adventures of the Star Kids	TV series	Moon (voice)	Major role

== Filmography, awards, and nominations ==
=== As producer, director, writer, or editor ===
Year	Film Title	Involvement	Notes
1990	The Urban Gorilla	producer, director, writer, editor	Nominated – 1990 Emmy Award; Nominated – 1990 Emmy Award; DuPont-Columbia Award; Jackson Hole Wildlife Film Festival – First recipient of the Best Newcomer award Christopher Columbus Award; WorldFest-Houston International Film Festival Award; Genesis Award; Narrator – Glenn Close
1992	Keepers of the Wild	producer, director, writer	Won – 1992 National Emmy Award for directing Christopher Columbus Award; Narrator – Glenn Close
1996	The Last Frog	producer, director, writer, narrator	Won – 1996 National Emmy Award; Jackson Hole Wildlife Film Festival Award; Japan international Wildlife Film Festival Award; Missoula International Wildlife Film Festival Best of Festival; Earthwatch Award
1997	Stolen Treasures	producer, director, writer, narrator	
1997	King Cobra	writer	Won - 1997 Emmy Award News and Documentary
1997	Lords of the Everglades	writer	
1997	Extraordinary Dogs	producer, director	Finalist - Jackson Hole Wildlife Film Festival
1997	Snake Invasion	producer, director, writer, narrator	
1999	The Secret Life of Cats	producer, director, writer, narrator	Won – 1999 National Emmy Award; Jackson Hole Wildlife Film Festival; Japan international Wildlife Film Festival; International Wildlife Film Festival; ITVA Peer Awards; Christopher Columbus Award
1999	Wisdom of the Wild	producer, director, writer, narrator	
2000	The Urban Elephant	producer, director, writer, narrator	Won – 2001 Emmy Award for Outstanding Cultural & Informational Documentary – Best Director; The New York Festivals World Medal; Genesis Award
2003	Inca Mummies: Secrets of a Lost World	producer, director, writer, narrator	ITVA Peer Awards
2004	Return to Freedom	producer, director, writer, narrator, editor	A short film for the American Wild Horse Sanctuary
2006	Chimpanzees: An Unnatural History	producer, director, writer, narrator	Won - 2007 National Emmy Award for Outstanding Individual Achievement in a Craft: Research; Genesis Award; Best Editing, Best Television Program $250,000-$500,000 Budget, Merit for Powerful Storytelling, and Merit for Advocacy at the International Wildlife Film Festival; Christopher Columbus Award; Explorer's Club
2008	Crash: A Tale of Two Species	producer, director, writer, editor, narrator	31st International Wildlife Film Festival: Sapphire Award-Second Place, Best Conservation & Environmental Issue, Best Script; Nominated - National Emmy Award
2009	Frogs: The Thin Green Line	producer, director, writer, editor, narrator	Selection for DC Environmental Film Fest
2011	9/11: Where Were You?	producer, director, writer, editor	This film is about immediate responses to the attack on the World Trade Center.
2013	Parrot Confidential	producer, writer, editor, narrator	Genesis Award; Special Jury Award, New York Wild Film Festival
2015	The Sagebrush Sea	co-producer, writer, narrator	
2017	The Last Pig	director, co-producer	
