= Joe Williams Sings About You! =

Studio album by Joe Williams
- Released: 1959
- Recorded: July 14 & 16, 1959
- Genre: Vocal, jazz
- Length: 32:00
- Label: Roulette

Joe Williams Sings About You! is a 1959 album by jazz singer Joe Williams, produced by Teddy Reig and arranged and conducted by Jimmy Jones. It was released on Roulette Records.

== Track listing ==
1. "I Was Telling Her About You" (Moose Charlap, Don George) - 3:50
2. "You're Mine You" (Edward Heyman, Johnny Green) - 2:45
3. "Poor You" (Burton Lane, E. Y. Harburg) - 3:00
4. "If I Should Lose You" (Ralph Rainger, Leo Robin) - 2:36
5. "The Very Thought of You" (Ray Noble) - 2:43
6. "You Are Too Beautiful" (Richard Rodgers, Lorenz Hart) - 2:43
7. "The Girl in My Dreams Tries to Look Like You" (Duke Ellington, Johnny Mercer) - 3:04
8. "I Can't Resist You" (Ned Wever, Will Donaldson) - 2:38
9. "You're a Sweetheart" (Harold Adamson, Jimmy McHugh) - 2:55
10. "With Every Breath I Take" (Leo Robin, Ralph Rainger) - 2:00
11. "When Did You Leave Heaven" (Richard Whiting, Walter Bullock) - 2:31
12. "I Only Have Eyes For You" (Al Dubin, Harry Warren) - 3:04
