= Hal McIntyre =

American jazz saxophonist, clarinetist and bandleader (1914–1959)

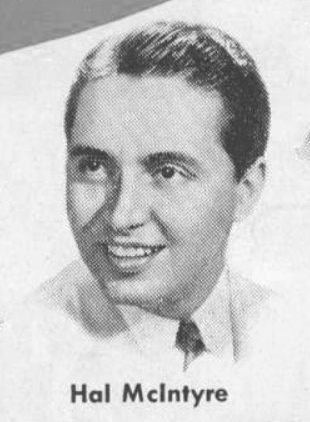
- McIntyre in a 1944 advertisement

Background information
- Born: Harold William McIntyre; November 29, 1914; Cranston, Rhode Island, U.S.
- Died: May 5, 1959 (aged 44) Los Angeles, California, U.S.
- Genres: Swing
- Occupations: Musician, bandleader, composer
- Instrument: Saxophone
- Years active: 1930s–1959

Hal McIntyre (born Harold William McIntyre; November 29, 1914, Cromwell, Connecticut – May 5, 1959, Los Angeles, California) was an American saxophonist, clarinetist, and bandleader.

McIntyre played extensively as a teenager and led his own octet in 1935. Shortly thereafter, he was offered a temporary slot as an alto saxophonist behind Benny Goodman; this lasted only ten days, but Glenn Miller heard of his ability and drafted him as a founding member of the Glenn Miller Orchestra, where he played from 1937 to 1941.

Miller encouraged McIntyre to start his own group again, and the McIntyre Orchestra first played in New Rochelle, New York in 1941; the ensemble included vocalists Gloria Van, Ruth Gaylor, and Al Nobel, bassist Eddie Safranski, and saxophonist Allen Eager. They played many major ballrooms throughout the United States, and played overseas for troops during World War II. He toured extensively with singer Sunny Gale until the summer of 1951. He maintained the orchestra into the 1950s, backing The Mills Brothers for their 1952 smash hit "Glow Worm".

He co-wrote the song "Daisy Mae" with Billy May which was recorded by Glenn Miller and His Orchestra.

McIntyre was critically injured in an apartment fire in 1959, and died at a hospital a few days later.

== Radio ==
Beginning January 2, 1945, McIntyre and his orchestra had a weekly broadcast on the Blue Network. One feature of the program was that on each program the orchestra would "play the theme song of one of America's college fraternities as a salute to some member of that fraternity who has distinguished himself in the war effort."
