= Dennis Lewiston =

Dennis C. Lewiston or Denis Lewiston (22 May 1934 – 8 June 2014) was a British cinematographer and former camera operator with a career spanning the 1960s through the 1990s. He has worked mostly on American television movies. He occasionally worked as a film director or screenwriter.
