= Inca Mummies: Secrets of a Lost World =

Inca Mummies: Secrets of a Lost World is a 2002 documentary that explores the Inca civilization.

== Film content ==
National Geographic documents the process as archaeologists attempt to save hundreds of Inca mummies from destruction and looters. Guillermo Cock, a Peruvian-born archaeologist, and Peter Frost, an Inca researcher, travel to Lima, Peru, to further understand the Inca's sacrificial rituals and culture.

== Background ==
The Puruchuco site featured in the film is said to be the second largest Inca cemetery where a number of mummy bundles were recovered. The discovery has led to the fascination with the Inca burial rituals. There are two types of Inca mummies; the rulers and the sacrificed ones. The mummies that have been discovered are those of sacrificed individuals and that of the Inca elite.

As well as leaving clues behind that give insight into the Inca culture, the mummies discovered were in excellent condition. The preservation of these mummies was so good, that archaeologists were able to determine the sex by looking at them. The mummy bundles contained up to seven people, some being topped with fake heads. Although this has been a substantial discovery, Guillermo Cock believes that, "Only 40 percent of the occupants of the Inca burial ground have been recovered." Once all of the mummies and artifacts have been salvaged they will be moved to a museum in Peru.

== Cast and crew ==
- Allison Argo (Director, Producer, Writer and Narrator)
- Mark Adler (Music Composer)
- Andrew Young (Cinematographer)
- Catherine Shields (Film Editor)
- Peter Frost (Inca Researcher/Archaeologist)
- Guillermo Cock (Archaeologist)

=== Guillermo Cock ===
Guillermo Cock has been excavating in Peru since 1983. He attended Catholic University in Peru and the University of California where he completed his master's in archaeology. He is an expert on Andean cultures and has contributed publications, books, articles, and papers on their history. He has led archaeological expeditions to Pacatnam and Dos Cabezas in the Jequetepeque Valley and at Chira-Villa, Garagay and Puruchuco in the Rimac Valley.

== Awards ==
- Governor's Award from the Academy of Arts and Sciences.
- ITVA Peer awards.
