= Ruth Gaylor =

American big band vocalist (1918–1972)

Ruth Gaylor (May 5, 1918 - March 21, 1972) was an American big band vocalist, active in the music industry from 1935 to 1945.

Born in Brooklyn, New York, Gaylor began her singing career with the Hudson-DeLange Orchestra in 1935, recording with them until November 1936. In April 1937, she joined Mitchell Ayres' group and sang at the Hollywood Restaurant in New York until November of the same year. In early 1938, Gaylor sang with Will Haynes before joining Bunny Berigan's orchestra in mid-April. She recorded with the group and appeared on their radio program until at least June of that year, but left the group by September.

In January 1940, Gaylor joined Teddy Powell's orchestra, but she left the band in early 1942 to marry Fred Dick, a doctor. After her husband joined the service and went overseas, Gaylor returned to work and joined Hal McIntyre’s orchestra in April 1944, recording the 1945 hit song “My Funny Valentine” with the orchestra. Gaylor appeared with McIntyre's orchestra in three films: "Eddie Was a Lady" (1945), "Night Club Girl" (1945), and "Sing Me a Song of Texas" (1945). In October 1945, Gaylor put in her notice to leave McIntyre when her husband, who was a captain in the Army Medical Corps, was scheduled to return home from the war. However, when he contracted yellow fever and had to stay abroad, she rescinded her notice.

Gaylor traveled to Europe with McIntyre’s band during a USO tour in late 1945. During a show at the Earle in Philadelphia, a situation arose between Gaylor and Georgia Gibbs, who was headlining the touring bill. Gaylor's only song on the tour was “I’m Gonna Love That Guy,” but Gibbs decided to sing the same song, leaving Gaylor with no time to prepare other arrangements. She had to sit out the show, which meant not getting paid. The incident made the trade press and the gossip columns.

Gaylor left McIntyre and retired from singing in January 1946 when her husband finally returned home from overseas. She gave birth to her first child, a daughter, that September. Gaylor died on March 21, 1972, in New York, at the age of 53.
