= Jump for Joy (Joe Williams album) =

Studio album by Joe Williams
- Released: November 26, 1963
- Recorded: February 4 – March 13, 1963
- Venues: Webster Hall, Manhattan, New York City
- Genre: Jazz
- Length: 28:28
- Label: RCA Victor
- Producer: George Avakian

Jump for Joy is a 1963 studio album recorded by Joe Williams, produced by George Avakian, and arranged and conducted by Jimmy Jones and Oliver Nelson. It was recorded at Webster Hall, a nightclub in Manhattan and released on RCA Victor. It was released as a vinyl LP record in 1963 and as a CD in 1993 (under the Bluebird/RCA label) and again as a remastered version on CD (under the Sony Music label) in 2015.

== Reception ==
AllMusic praised the album for the variety of familiar standards as well as some obscure ones and that it "tries to portray Williams as more than just a blues singer". All About Jazz gave positive remarks regarding the album's "swing-style" rendition of the songs while stating that "few jazz singers could master the blues style as well as Williams".

== Track listing ==
1. "Wrap Your Troubles in Dreams (And Dream Your Troubles Away)" (Billy Moll, Harry Barris, Ted Koehler) - 2:12
2. "I Went Out of My Way" (Helen Bliss) - 2:23
3. "The Great City" (Curtis Lewis) - 2:25
4. "You Perfect Stranger" (Michael Corda, Peter Windsor) - 2:22
5. "A Good Thing" (Marvin Fisher, Jack Segal) - 2:49
6. "It's a Wonderful World" (Harold Adamson, Jan Savitt, John Kluczko Watson, Johnny Watson) - 2:00
7. "Sounds of the Night" (Gerald Fried, Johnny Mercer) - 2:24
8. "Just A-Sittin' and A-Rockin' " (Duke Ellington, Lee Gaines, Billy Strayhorn) - 2:35
9. "(This Is) My Last Affair" (Haven Johnson) - 2:25
10. "More Than Likely" (J. Leslie McFarland) - 1:57
11. "She Doesn't Know (I Love Her)" (Marvin Fisher, Jack Segal) - 2:37
12. "Jump for Joy" (Duke Ellington, Sid Kuller, Paul Francis Webster) - 2:19
