= Me and the Blues =

Studio album by Joe Williams
- Released: 1964
- Recorded: January 2, 1963 – December 5, 1963
- Venue: Webster Hall, New York City
- Genre: Jazz, blues
- Length: 43:27
- Label: RCA Victor
- Producer: George Avakian

Me and the Blues is a 1964 studio album recorded by jazz singer Joe Williams, produced by George Avakian and arranged by Jimmy Jones and Oliver Nelson. It was recorded live at Webster Hall in New York City. The album features one song with original lyrics by Williams titled, "Every Night". The album was also included in a compilation album paired with The Song is You, another album by Joe Williams.

== Reception ==
The album received positive reviews. A review by a listener on AllMusic stated that "Joe Williams' vocals are smooth and authentic". Another review on AllMusic praised the variety of song genres throughout the album. A review on the online record store, DustyGroove, stated that "the pairing of Jimmy Jones and Oliver Nelson's bands complement Joe's vocals". A review on the magazine website JazzTimes praised the album for its impressive sound and Williams' singing style.

== Track listing ==
1. "I'm Sticking with You, Baby" (Henry Glover, Rudolph Toombs) - 2:45
2. "Me and the Blues" (Harry Warren, Ted Koehler) - 3:02
3. "Every Night" (Joe Williams) - 2:55
4. "Rocks in my Bed" (Duke Ellington) - 3:35
5. "Come On Blues" (Joe Bailey) - 2:53
6. "Work Song (Workin')" (Nat Adderley, Oscar Brown Jr.) - 2:30
7. "Soothe Me" (Joe Greene) - 2:22
8. "Early in the Morning" (Louis Jordan, Dallas Bartley, Leo Hickman) - 2:48
9. "Good Morning Heartache" (Dan Fisher, Ervin Drake, Irene Higgenbotham) - 3:14
10. "Kansas City" (Jerome Leiber, Mike Stoller) - 2:43
11. "A Woman" (Joe Bailey, Morris Levy, Sonny Lester) - 2:45
12. "Hobo Flats" (Oliver Nelson, Quincy Jones) - 2:34
