= Joe Williams (jazz singer) =

American jazz singer (1918–1999)

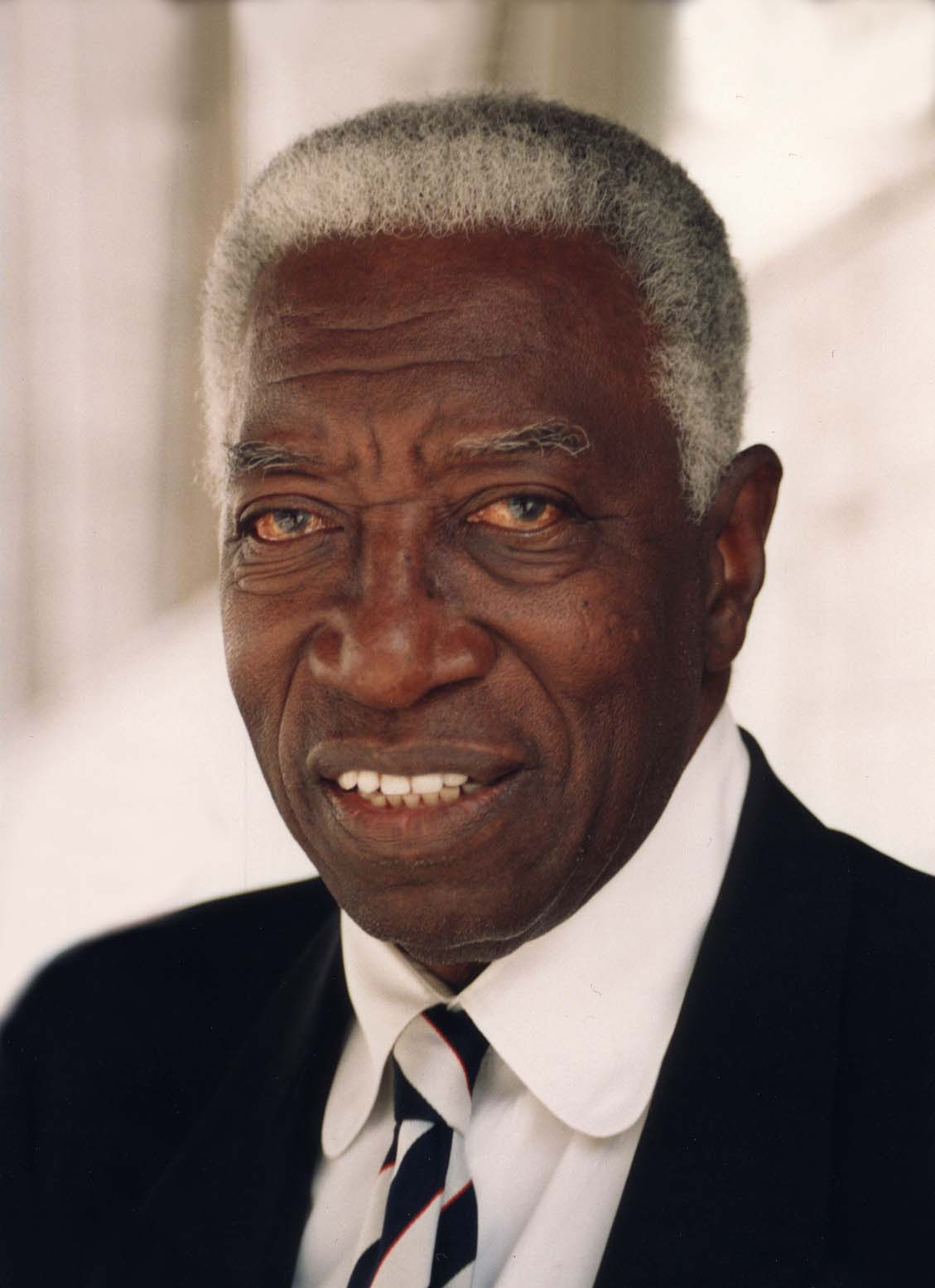
- Williams in 1997

Background information
- Born: Joseph Goreed; December 12, 1918; Cordele, Georgia, U.S.
- Died: March 29, 1999 (aged 80) Las Vegas, Nevada, U.S.
- Genres: Jazz; blues; swing; traditional pop
- Occupation: Singer
- Years active: 1937–1998
- Labels: Roulette; RCA Victor; Verve; Telarc

Joe Williams (born Joseph Goreed; December 12, 1918 – March 29, 1999) was an American jazz singer. He sang with big bands, such as the Count Basie Orchestra and the Lionel Hampton Orchestra, and with small combos. He sang in two films with the Basie orchestra and sometimes worked as an actor.

== Early life ==
Williams was born in Cordele, Georgia, the son of Willie Goreed and Anne Beatrice, née Gilbert. When he was about three, his mother and grandmother took him to Chicago; he grew up on the South Side, where he attended Austin Otis Sexton Elementary School and Englewood High School. In the 1930s, as a teenager, he was a member of a gospel group, the Jubilee Boys, and performed in Chicago churches.

== Career ==
Williams began singing professionally as a soloist in 1937. He sometimes sang with big bands: from 1937, he performed with Jimmie Noone's Apex Club Orchestra, and also toured with Les Hite in the Midwest. In 1941, he toured with Coleman Hawkins to Memphis, Tennessee. In 1943, he performed in Boston with the Lionel Hampton Orchestra. He sang with Red Saunders at the Club DeLisa in Chicago in 1945, and in 1946 was in New York with Andy Kirk.

In the late 1940s, Williams was ill and performed on a sporadic basis. By October 1950, he was again at the Club DeLisa with Red Saunders, where Count Basie heard him.

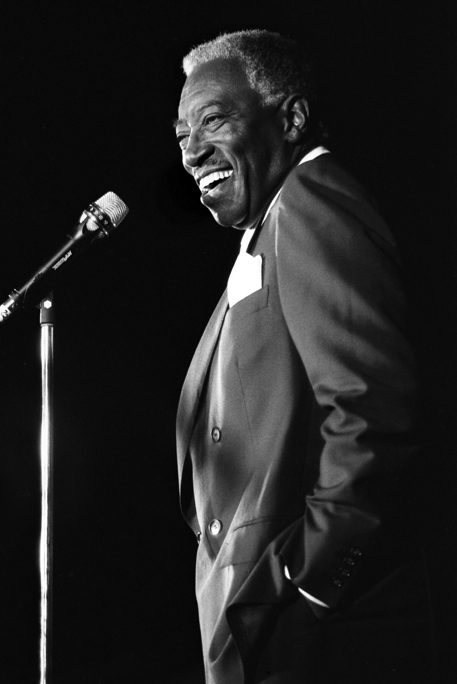
Joe Williams at the Palo Alto Jazz Festival in September 1986

From 1954 to 1961, he was the singer for the Count Basie Orchestra. "Every Day I Have the Blues", recorded in 1955, and "Alright, Okay, You Win" were among many successful recordings from this period.

After leaving the Basie band, Williams had a successful career as a soloist at festivals, in clubs, and on television. He and Basie remained on good terms, and he regularly appeared with the Basie orchestra. He toured and made recordings with many other musicians, including Harry "Sweets" Edison in 1961–62, Junior Mance between 1962 and 1964, George Shearing in 1971, and Cannonball Adderley between 1973 and 1975. He went on a long tour from Egypt to India with Clark Terry in 1977, and toured Europe and the United States with Thad Jones and the Basie Orchestra in 1985. He also worked with his own combos, which between 1970 and 1990 usually included the pianist Norman Simmons, and often had Henry Johnson on guitar.

Williams sang with the Basie orchestra in two films, Jamboree in 1957 and Cinderfella in 1960. He sometimes worked as an actor, and he had a supporting role in the movie The Moonshine War released in 1970. Williams appeared several times on Sesame Street in the 1980s and early 1990s.

In 1982, Joe played the part of jazz musician Sonny Goodman in an episode ("Jazz") of the television series Lou Grant. He later portrayed Al Hanks, father of Clair Huxtable, in three episodes of the 1984–1992 series The Cosby Show ("Clair's Sister," season 2; "The March," season 3; "And So We Commence," season 8).

In later life, Williams often worked in hotels and clubs in Las Vegas, Nevada, but also sang at festivals and worked on cruise ships. He toured again with the Basie Orchestra, this time under the direction of Frank Foster, who had succeeded Thad Jones as leader of the band. Williams sang with the former Ellington Orchestra drummer Louie Bellson in Duke Ellington's jazz suite Black, Brown and Beige; in about 1993 or 1994 he again toured with George Shearing.

== Death ==
Williams had a history of respiratory issues throughout his career but managed to treat them with home oxygen and other treatments. On March 29, 1999, he was hospitalized for breathing issues at Sunrise Hospital and Medical Center in Las Vegas. Not trusting of the medication given for his respiratory problems due to side effects, he requested his wife to take him home. After she refused, Williams left on his own and collapsed on the street about 2 miles away from the hospital from the sweltering Las Vegas heat. He died later that day at the age of 80.

== Awards and honors ==
Williams won the Best Jazz Vocal Performance Grammy Award for his LP Nothin' but the Blues in 1984; it was also the winning Traditional Blues Album in the Blues Music Awards of the Blues Foundation in the following year. Williams was nominated for seven other Grammy awards: for Prez & Joe (1979); "8 to 5 I Lose" (1982); I Just Want To Sing (1986); Every Night: Live At Vine St. (1987); "I Won't Leave You Again" (with Lena Horne, 1988); "Is You Is or Is You Ain't My Baby" (with Marlena Shaw, 1989); and In Good Company (1989).

In 1988, Williams received an Honorary Doctorate of Music from Berklee College of Music. He also was a co-founder of the Fillius Jazz Archive from Hamilton College, where he also received an honorary degree.

In 1992, his 1955 recording of "Every Day I Have the Blues" with Basie was added to the Grammy Hall of Fame for recordings of particular historical or qualitative importance. Williams was added to the Jazz Wall of Fame of the American Society of Composers, Authors and Publishers in 2001.

In 1988, with his wife Jillean and friends, Williams set up the not-for-profit Joe Williams Every Day Foundation to offer scholarships to talented young musicians.

== Discography ==
=== As leader ===
- Sings Everyday (Regent, 1956)
- Count Basie Swings, Joe Williams Sings (Clef, 1955)
- The Greatest!! Count Basie Plays, Joe Williams Sings Standards (Verve, 1956)
- At Newport (with Count Basie) (Verve, 1957)
- One O'Clock Jump (with Count Basie, Ella Fitzgerald) (Verve, 1957)
- A Man Ain't Supposed to Cry (Roulette, 1958)
- Memories Ad-Lib (with Count Basie) (Roulette, 1959)
- Joe Williams Sings About You! (Roulette, 1959)
- Everyday I Have the Blues (with Count Basie) (Roulette, 1959)
- With Songs About That Kind of Woman (Roulette, 1960)
- Just the Blues (with the Count Basie orchestra) (Roulette, 1960)
- Sentimental & Melancholy (Roulette, 1961)
- Together (with Harry "Sweets" Edison) (Roulette, 1961)
- Have a Good Time with Joe Williams (Roulette, 1961)
- Joe Williams Live! A Swingin' Night at Birdland (Roulette, 1962)
- Jump for Joy (RCA Victor, 1963)
- At Newport '63 (RCA Victor, 1963)
- One Is a Lonesome Number (Roulette, 1963)
- Havin' a Good Time (Hyena, The Music Force, 1963)
- Me and the Blues (RCA Victor, 1964)
- A New Kind of Love (Roulette, 1964)
- We Three (with Dinah Washington, Sarah Vaughan) (Roulette, 1964)
- The Song Is You (RCA Victor, 1965)
- Scat Man Crothers & Joe Williams (Pickwick, 1965)
- The Exciting Joe Williams (RCA Victor, 1966)
- Alright, Okay (with Count Basie) (Verve [UK], 1966) compilation
- Presenting Joe Williams and Thad Jones Mel Lewis Jazz Orchestra (Solid State, 1967)
- Something Old, New and Blue (Solid State, 1968)
- Worth Waiting For... (Blue Note, 1970)
- Live in Vegas (Hmo, 1971)
- The Heart and Soul of Joe Williams and George Shearing (Sheba, 1971)
- With Love (Temponic, 1972)
- Joe Williams Live (with Cannonball Adderley) (Fantasy, 1973)
- Prez & Joe: In Celebration of Lester Young (with Dave Pell's Prez Conference) (GNP Crescendo, 1979)
- Nothin' but the Blues (Delos, 1983)
- Then and Now (Bosco; Sea Breeze, 1984)
- I Just Want to Sing (Delos, 1985)
- Having the Blues Under European Sky (Denon, 1985)
- Every Night: Live at Vine St. (Verve, 1987)
- In Good Company (Verve, 1989)
- That Holiday Feelin' (Verve, 1990)
- Ballad and Blues Master [live] (Verve, 1992)
- Live at Orchestra Hall, Detroit (Telarc, 1993)
- Here's to Life (Telarc, 1994)
- Joe Williams and Friends (Spotlite Records, 1994)
- Feel the Spirit (Telarc, 1995)
- One For My Baby (Laserlite, 1998)
- Live at Manchester Craftmen's Guild (Jazz MCG, 1999)
- Riviera Summit (with Carmen Mcrae) (Starburst Records, 2001)

=== As guest ===
- Count Basie, A Night at Count Basie's (Vanguard, 1955)
- Count Basie, Breakfast Dance and Barbecue [live] (Roulette, 1959)
- Count Basie, Sing Along with Basie (with Lambert, Hendricks & Ross) (Roulette, 1959)
- The Capp-Pierce Juggernaut, Live at the Century Plaza (Concord Jazz, 1978)
- Benny Carter, Benny Carter Songbook (MusicMasters, 1996)
- Benny Carter, Benny Carter Songbook Volume II (MusicMasters, 1997)
- Lena Horne, The Men in My Life (Three Cherries, 1988)
- Milt Jackson, The Prophet Speaks (Qwest, 1994)
- Marian McPartland, Piano Jazz with Joe Williams (Jazz Alliance, 1991)
- Diane Schuur, Pure Schuur (GRP, 1991)
