= Gregg Berger filmography =

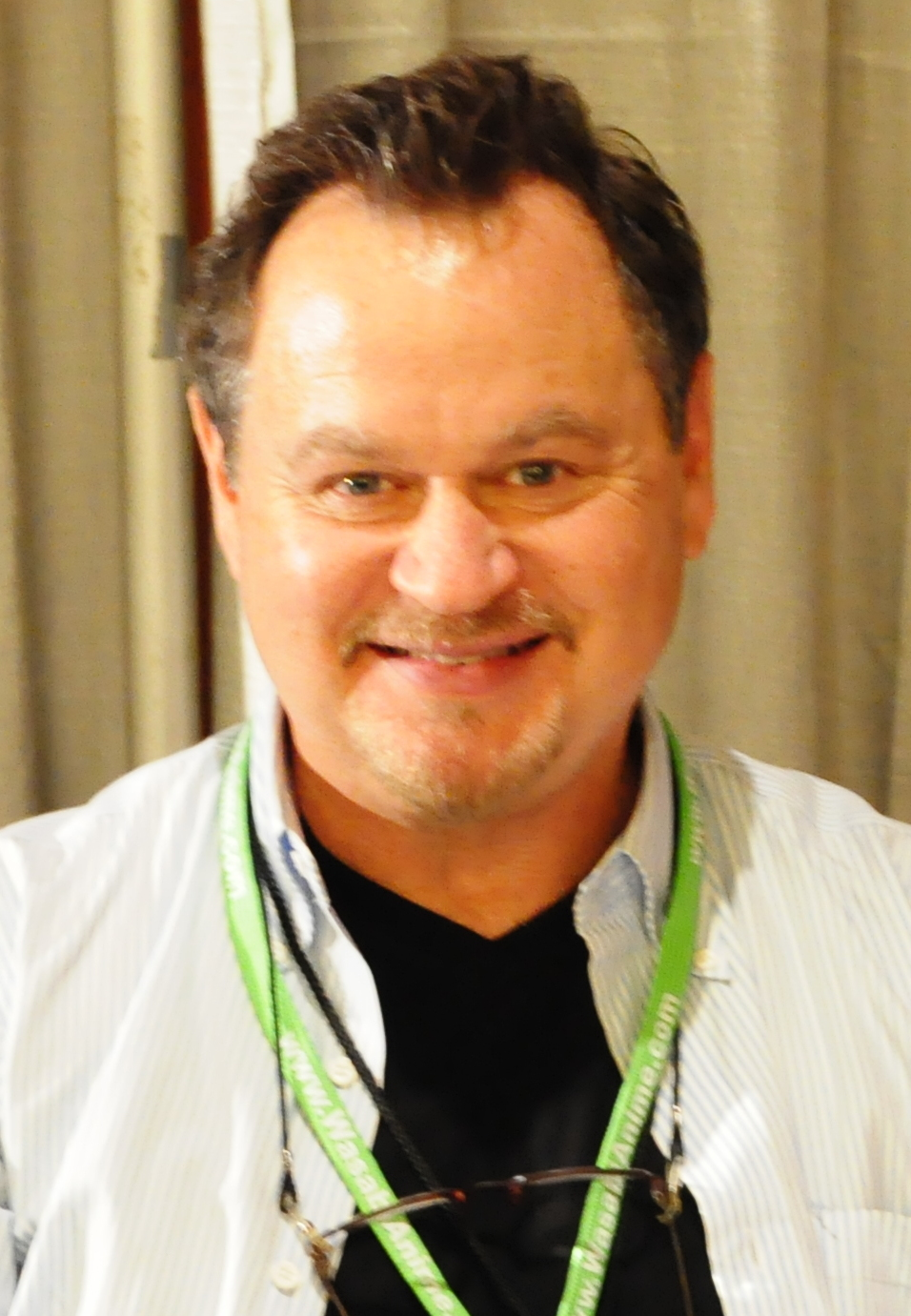
Berger at the Florida Supercon in 2012

Gregg Berger has been featured in various films, television shows, and video games. He is best known for voicing Odie in the Garfield franchise, Hunter the Cheetah and Ripto in the Spyro the Dragon franchise, Eeyore in the Winnie the Pooh franchise, and Grimlock in The Transformers franchise. He has also been featured in a documentary called I Know That Voice. Berger has been featured in rides at amusement parks, being the narrator in the Men in Black: Alien Attack ride at Universal Studios Florida, and reprising the role of Eeyore in The Many Adventures of Winnie the Pooh ride at Magic Kingdom and Disneyland.

== Filmography ==
=== Anime ===
Year	Title	Role	Notes	Source
1978	Ringing Bell	Adult Chirin		
1981	The New Adventures of Gigantor	Coldark	5 episodes	
1985	Tranzor Z	Devleen, Tommy Davis		
1988	Grimm Masterpiece Theatre	Maria's Father	Episode: "Natsu no niwa to fuyu no niwa no hanashi"	
1989	Little Nemo: Adventures in Slumberland	Equestrian Master	Credited as Greg Barger	
1992	Secret of the Seal	Captain Marko	Uncredited	
2003	Astro Boy	Additional voices		

=== Film ===
Year	Title	Role	Notes	Source
1983	The Dragon That Wasn't (Or Was He?)	Oliver B. Bear	Voice, English version	
1985	Here Come the Littles	William Little	Voice	
1986	The Transformers: The Movie	Grimlock	Voice	
1986	Transformers: Five Faces of Darkness	Grimlock, Long Haul	Voice, direct-to-video	
1986	Wrinkles: In Need of Cuddles	Wrinkles	Voice, direct-to-video	
1986	Shadow World	Grey	Voice	
1987	G.I. Joe: The Movie	Motorviper	Voice, direct-to-video; credited as Greg Berger	
1991	Rover Dangerfield	Cal	Voice	
1992	Sinbad	Captain Chung, Cyclops	Voice, direct-to-video; uncredited	
1998	The Rugrats Movie	Circus TV Announcer	Voice	
1998	Storybook Friends - A Little Christmas Magic	Benson Bear, Fritz	Voice, direct-to-video	
1999	The Wacky Adventures of Ronald McDonald: The Visitors from Outer Space	Barber, Fatman, Food Fight Walla	Voice, direct-to-video	
1999	Mickey's Once Upon a Christmas	Mr. Anderson	Voice, direct-to-video	
1999	Winnie the Pooh: Seasons of Giving	Eeyore	Voice, direct-to-video	
2001	Recess: School's Out	Tech #1	Voice	
2001	Recess Christmas: Miracle on Third Street	Robotic Santa, TV Editor, Astronaut	Voice, direct-to-video	
2003	Sing Along Songs: Sing a Song with Pooh Bear and Piglet Too	Eeyore	Voice, direct-to-video	
2003	Recess: Taking the Fifth Grade	BoE Agent #4	Voice, direct-to-video	
2004	Clifford's Really Big Movie	Additional voices	Voice	
2004	Al Roach: Private Insectigator	Professor Bugdonovich	Voice, short film	
2004	Mickey's Twice Upon a Christmas	Additional voices	Voice, direct-to-video	
2005	Dinotopia: Quest for the Ruby Sunstone	SkyBax Patrolman	Voice, direct-to-video	
2007	Garfield Gets Real	Odie, Shecky, Hale	Voice, direct-to-video	
2007	Fly Me to the Moon 3D	Pale Russian Flies	Voice	
2008	Garfield's Fun Fest	Odie	Voice, direct-to-video	
2009	Garfield's Pet Force	Odie, Odious	Voice, direct-to-video	
2010	Lego: The Adventures of Clutch Powers	Watch Commander, Rock Powers	Voice, direct-to-video	
2012	Wings	Announcer Andy, Major Munson	Voice	
2013	Scooby-Doo! Mask of the Blue Falcon	Hank Price	Voice, direct-to-video	
2013	Monsters University	Additional voices	Voice	
2014	I Know That Voice	Himself	Documentary	
2014	The Big Bang	Kalani	Voice, short film	
2015	Inside Out	Additional voices	Voice	
2017	Despicable Me 3	Additional voices	Voice	
2017	The Star	Inn Keeper	Voice	

=== Television ===
Year	Title	Role	Notes	Source
1974	The Letter People	Mister T, Mister V, Mister Z	Voice	
1982	Here Comes Garfield	Odie, Pleasure Motors Salesman	Voice, television film	
1982	I'd Rather Be Calm	Herbie Weinstein	Television film	
1983	Benson	Fred Daniel	Episode: "Calamity Kraus"	
1983	Garfield on the Town	Ali Cat, Odie, Gang Cat #1, Sly	Voice, television film	
1983–1984	The Littles	Frank Little	Voice, 21 episodes	
1984	G.I. Joe: The Revenge of Cobra	Cutter, Spirit, Sparks, Firefly, Ripcord	Voice, 5 episodes	
1984	Garfield in the Rough	Odie, Ranger #1, Announcer	Voice, television film	
1984	SuperFriends: The Legendary Super Powers Show	Additional voices	Voice, 8 episodes	
1984	Pink Panther and Sons	Bowlhead	Voice, 2 episodes	
1984–1986	The Transformers	Grimlock, Long Haul, Skyfire, The Oracle, Outback, Golden One, Arab, Sentinel, TORQ III, Barbarian	33 episodes	
1985	The Jetsons	Curly Quasar	Voice, episode: "Judy's Birthday Surprise"	
1985	Garfield's Halloween Adventure	Odie, TV Announcer	Voice, television film	
1985	The Wuzzles	Tycoon	Voice, episode: "What's Up, Stox?"	
1985–1986	Galtar and the Golden Lance	Additional voices	Voice, 21 episodes	
1985–1986	G.I. Joe: A Real American Hero	Spirit, Cutter, Firefly, Sparks, Col. Brekhov, Solicitor Nichols, Gerber Lansford, Cossack, Ripcord, Arab, Admiral, Lead Cobra	Voice, 27 episodes	
1986	Garfield in Paradise	Pigeon, Odie	Voice, television film	
1986	G.I. Joe: Arise, Serpentor, Arise!	Col. Brekhov	Voice, television film	
1986	ABC Weekend Specials	William Little	Voice, episode: "Liberty and the Littles"	
1986–1988	Jem	Flint Westwood, Francois Truchet, The Beast, Mr. Kenyak, Sanders, Neko, Ghost of Jean LaFitte, Record Store Owner, Farmer, Robert Carling	Voice, 7 episodes	
1987	Garfield Goes Hollywood	Odie, Announcer, Bob, Grandma Fogerty	Voice, television film	
1987	Cathy	Mr. Pinkley	Voice, television film	
1987	Pound Puppies	Scrounger	Voice, episode: "Garbage Night: The Musical"	
1987	A Garfield Christmas Special	Odie	Voice, television film	
1987	G-Force: Guardians of Space	Stegosaur Commander	Voice, episode: "The Robot Stegosaur"	
1987–1989	The Smurfs	Additional voices	Voice, 2 episodes	
1988	Cathy's Last Resort	Mr. Pinkley	Voice, television film	
1988	Garfield: His 9 Lives	Odie, Jester	Voice, television film	
1988–1989	This Is America, Charlie Brown	Samuel, Thomas Watson, John Kruesi, Schilling, Mission Control Speaker, Orville Wright, Myles Standish, Samoset	Voice, 6 episodes	
1988–1990	Fantastic Max	A.B. Sitter	Voice, 15 episodes	
1988–1994	Garfield and Friends	Odie, additional voices	Voice, main role (121 episodes)	
1989	Cathy's Valentine	Mr. Pinkley	Voice, television film	
1989	Garfield's Babes and Bullets	Odie, Burt Fleebish	Voice, television film	
1989	DuckTales	High Muckyduck	Voice, episode: "The Land of Trala La"	
1989	Garfield's Thanksgiving	Odie	Voice, television film	
1990	Garfield's Feline Fantasies	Waiter, Odie	Voice, television film	
1990	The Adventures of Don Coyote and Sancho Panda	Additional voices	Voice, episode: "Pity the Poor Pirate"	
1990	Timeless Tales from Hallmark	Swallow, Grasshopper	Voice, episode: "Thumbelina"	
1990	Chip 'n Dale: Rescue Rangers	Wild Bill, Doctor	Voice, 3 episodes	
1991	Garfield Gets a Life	Odie, Stinky, Announcer, Man #2	Voice, television film	
1991	Toxic Crusaders	Junkyard	Voice, 13 episodes	
1991	Star Street: The Adventures of the Star Kids	The Great One	Voice	
1991	Where's Waldo?	Additional voices	Voice, 13 episodes	
1991	Space Cats	Additional voices	Voice, 13 episodes	
1992	Raw Toonage	Rock Doo-Wop, Caveman Security Guard, Caveman Cop	Voice, episode: "Cro-Magnum PI"	
1992	Goof Troop	Post Office Worker	Voice, episode: "Dr. Horatio's Magic Orchestra"	
1993	The Legend of Prince Valiant	Bosleigh	Voice, 4 episodes	
1993–1994	Bonkers	Pelican, Mr. Skunk, Mr. Corkscrew, Mr. McScam	Voice, 5 episodes	
1993–1994	The Little Mermaid	Pirate, Captain	Voice, 2 episodes	
1993–2006	Rugrats	Various voices	Voice, 5 episodes	
1994	Yogi the Easter Bear	Guard Dog, Narrator	Voice, television film	
1994	Edith Ann: Homeless Go Home	Buck Burton, Judge	Voice, television film	
1994	Beethoven	Cat, Dirt Salesman, Prince, Captain, Mouser, Lead Rat	Voice, 4 episodes	
1994	Fantastic Four	Mole Man	Voice, episode: "Mole Man"	
1994–1997	Duckman	Cornfed Pig, additional voices	Voice, 70 episodes	
1994–1997	Aaahh!!! Real Monsters	The Gromble, additional voices	Voice, main role (50 episodes)	
1995	Batman: The Animated Series	Rosie, Vincent Starkey	Voice, episode: "A Bullet for Bullock"	
1995	The Mask: Animated Series	Anchorman, Mugger, Policeman	Voice, episode: "Mayor Mask"	
1995	Wings	Mr. Douglas, Clerk	Voice, 2 episodes	
1995	Gargoyles	Leo	Voice, episode: "M.I.A."	
1995–1996	The Twisted Tales of Felix the Cat	Additional voices	Voice, 2 episodes; uncredited in one episode	
1995–1997	Spider-Man: The Animated Series	Mysterio, Kraven the Hunter	Voice, 7 episodes	
1995–1997	Life with Louie	Various voices	Voice, 7 episodes	
1996	What a Cartoon!	Man, Cat #2, Bear, Dog, Priest, Federal Agent, Cops	Voice, 3 episodes	
1996	Quack Pack	Mantis Boy, Chundel, Soldier	Voice, 3 episodes	
1996	The Story of Santa Claus	Additional voices	Voice, television film	
1997	The Real Adventures of Jonny Quest	Captain Rossanov	Voice, episode: "General Winter"	
1997–1998	Channel Umptee-3	Bud	Voice, 4 episodes	
1997–1998	Superman: The Animated Series	Agent #2, Manager	Voice, 2 episodes	
1997–2001	Johnny Bravo	Various voices	Voice, 3 episodes	
1997–1999	Cow and Chicken	Mr. Draftsman, Worker #1, Workman	Voice, 2 episodes	
1997–1999	The Drew Carey Show	Anchorman, Emcee	Voice, 2 episodes	
1997–2000	Recess	Young Larry Rogan, Ron, Construction Worker, NASA Scientist	Voice, 4 episodes	
1997–2000	The Angry Beavers	Various voices	Voice, 17 episodes; credited as Greg Berger in 2 episodes	
1998	Hey Arnold!	Lucky, Amusement Park Worker, Willie's Father, Policeman	Voice, 2 episodes	
1998	Kenny and the Chimp in Diseasy Does It! Or Chimp -n- Pox	Hotline Voice	Voice, TV short	
1999	Oh Yeah! Cartoons	Clerk	Voice, episode: "Magic Trixie"	
1998–1999	The Wild Thornberrys	Lemke, Doctor, Water Buffalo, Lion, Warthog	Voice, 3 episodes	
1998–2001	Men in Black: The Series	Agent K	Voice, 40 episodes	
1999	Dream Street	Hot-Air	Voice, episode: "Hot Air"	
1999	The Brothers Flub	Additional voices	Voice, 16 episodes	
1999	Rocket Power	Doug Dullard, Desk Clerk	Voice, episode: "Rocket Girls/Father's Day Off"	
1999–2000	The Sylvester & Tweety Mysteries	Veterinarian #1, Washday (Jack Webb), Narrator	Voice, 3 episodes	
1999–2000	Batman Beyond	Dispatch Agent, Pilot, Bat Computer, Golem Controller	Voice, 4 episodes	
1999–2003	The Powerpuff Girls	FBI Agent, Bad Guy #1, Truant Officer	Voice, 2 episodes	
2000	Becker	Clerk	Episode: "One Angry Man"	
2001	Gary & Mike	Various	Voice, episode: "Phish Phry"	
2001	Static Shock	Game Show Host	Voice, episode: "Replay"	
2001	Time Squad	Meriwether Lewis, William Clark	Voice, episode: "Lewis and Clark and Larry"	
2002	The Zeta Project	Agent	Voice, episode: "The Hologram Man"	
2002–2007	The Grim Adventures of Billy & Mandy	Chattering Teeth, Puggle, Student #2, Root Rot, Lawyer, Bookworm, Bailiff, FBI Agent	Voice, 4 episodes	
2008–2016	The Garfield Show	Odie, additional voices	Voice, main role (115 episodes)	
2009–2011	Batman: The Brave and the Bold	Creature King, Hammertoes, Mob Boss	Voice, 2 episodes	
2011	Mad	Jake Lonergan, Claudus	Voice, episode: "Cowboys & Alien Force/ThunderLOLcats"	
2011–2014	Mini Adventures of Winnie the Pooh	Eeyore	Voice, 7 episodes	
2012	Hot in Cleveland	Barry the Parrot	Voice, 2 episodes	
2012	Star Wars: The Clone Wars	General Kalani	Voice, 2 episodes	
2016	Transformers: Robots in Disguise	Stockade, Cyclone Mini-Con	Voice, episode: "Graduation Exercises"	
2016	Star Wars Rebels	Kalani	Voice, episode: "The Last Battle"	
2016	Lastman	Additional voices	Voice, 7 episodes	
2017	Spider-Man	Absorbing Man	Voice, episode: "Screwball Live"	
2018	Avengers Assemble	Absorbing Man	Voice, episode: "The Citadel"	
2018	Transformers: Power of the Primes	Grimlock, Volcanicus	Voice, 10 episodes	

=== Video games ===
Year	Title	Role	Notes	Source
1994	Quest for Glory: Shadows of Darkness	Dmitri Ivanov the Burgomeister		
1996	Nickelodeon 3D Movie Maker	The Gromble		
1996	Blazing Dragons	Sir Blaze, Ancient Al, Canary, Enchanted Pool, Monk #2		
1997	The Curse of Monkey Island	Cutthroat Bill		
1997	Ready for Math with Pooh	Eeyore		
1997	Duckman: The Graphic Adventures of a Private Dick	Cornfed Pig		
1998	Small Soldiers	Archer		
1998	My Interactive Pooh	Eeyore		
1998	Baldur's Gate	Daveorn, Entar, Rieltar, Sonner		
1999	Star Wars: Episode I - The Phantom Menace	Battle Droid, Darth Maul, Mat Rags		
1999	Tarzan	Kerchak		
1999	Spyro 2: Ripto's Rage!	Hunter the Cheetah, Ripto, Foremen, Master Chef, Breezebuilders, Crush, Gulp, Yeti		
1999	Gabriel Knight 3: Blood of the Sacred, Blood of the Damned	Abbé Arnaud, Roman Soldier		
1999	Winnie the Pooh: Toddler	Eeyore		
1999	Winnie the Pooh: Preschool	Eeyore		
1999	Winnie the Pooh: Kindergarten	Eeyore		
2000	Star Wars Episode I: Jedi Power Battles	Plo Koon, Darth Maul, Thug 2		
2000	Ground Control	Paladin Magnus, Squad Voice, Dropship Voice		
2000	Forgotten Realms: Icewind Dale	Everard		
2000	Star Wars Episode I: Racer	Wan Sandage, Cy Yunga, Jinn Reeso		
2000	Baldur's Gate II - Shadow of Amn	Simyaz, Isaea Roenal, Oisig		
2000	Tigger's Honey Hunt	Eeyore		
2000	Spyro: Year of the Dragon	Hunter the Cheetah		
2000	Command & Conquer: Red Alert 2	Allied Boat, Intruder		
2000	The Emperor's New Groove	Stone Block Father		
2000	Wacky Races	Narrator		
2000	Disney's Activity Center: Winnie the Pooh	Eeyore		
2000	Star Wars: Jar Jar's Journey Adventure Book	Ishi Tib, Battle Droid		
2001	Disney's Activity Center: Tigger	Eeyore		
2001	Final Fantasy X	Jecht		
2001	Winnie the Pooh: Baby	Eeyore		
2001	Winnie the Pooh: Kindergarten	Eeyore		
2001	Star Wars: Obi-Wan	Battle Droid Infantry, Male Citizen 2, Plo Koon, Darth Maul		
2002	Star Wars: Racer Revenge	Tzidik Wrantojo, Wan Sandage Jr.		
2002	Pirates: The Legend of Black Kat	Salty		
2002	Command & Conquer: Renegade	Mendoza		
2002	Playhouse Disney's The Book of Pooh: A Story Without a Tail	Eeyore		
2002	Star Wars: Jedi Knight II - Jedi Outcast	Bespin Cop, Shadow Trooper, Stormtrooper	Credited as Greg Berger	
2002	Star Wars: Galactic Battlegrounds - Clone Campaigns	Confederacy Trooper		
2002	Bruce Lee: Quest of the Dragon	Additional Voices		
2002	The Scorpion King: Rise of the Akkadian	Jesup, Dice Man #1		
2002	Superman: Shadow of Apokolips	Small Interbot, Guard, Technician		
2002	Earth and Beyond	Starbase Traffic Controller		
2002	Spyro: Enter the Dragonfly	Hunter		
2002	Star Wars: Bounty Hunter	Connus Trell	Credited as Greg Berger	
2002	007: Nightfire	Q		
2002	Treasure Planet: Battle at Procyon	Mantavor Crew, Densadron Crew, Aquanog Captain		
2002	Disney Sports Soccer	Big Bad Wolf		
2002	Disney Sports Football	Big Bad Wolf		
2002	Emperor: Battle for Dune	Executrix Council		
2003	Final Fantasy X-2	Jecht	English version	
2003	Piglet's Big Game	Eeyore	Credited as Gregg A. Berger	
2003	Arc the Lad: Twilight of the Spirits	Samson		
2003	Viewtiful Joe	Captain Blue		
2003	Star Wars: Knights of the Old Republic	Additional voices		
2003	Star Wars: Jedi Knight - Jedi Academy	Rax Joris, Rockettrooper Officer, Stormtrooper, Merchant		
2003	Call of Duty	Sgt. Moody		
2003	Legacy of Kain: Defiance	Turel		
2003	Dinosaur Hunting	Gregory, Frenchman		
2004	Call of Duty: United Offensive	Sgt. Moody		
2004	Ty the Tasmanian Tiger 2: Bush Rescue	Bunyip Elder, Patch, Foreman Norman		
2004	EverQuest II	Various voices		
2004	Metal Gear Solid 3: Snake Eater	The Pain		
2004	Viewtiful Joe 2	Captain Blue		
2004	Ape Escape Academy	Monkey Red, Red Pipotron	NTSC-U version	
2005	Winnie the Pooh's Rumbly Tumbly Adventure	Eeyore		
2005	Shadow of Rome	Barca		
2005	Guild Wars	Erek, additional voices		
2005	Ape Escape 3	Monkey Red	NTSC-U version; credited as Greg Berger	
2005	Viewtiful Joe: Red Hot Rumble	Captain Blue		
2005	Age of Empires III	Frederick the Great		
2005	Ty the Tasmanian Tiger 3: Night of the Quinkan	Bunyip Elder		
2005	Yakuza	Additional voices		
2005	Metal Gear Solid 3: Subsistence	The Pain		
2005	Kingdom Hearts II	Eeyore		
2006	X-Men: The Official Game	Beast		
2006	Dead Rising	Brock Mason		
2006	Desperate Housewives: The Game	Vincent Corsetty		
2006	Gothic 3	Additional voices		
2006	Marvel: Ultimate Alliance	Attuma, Galactus, Thing		
2006	Spider-Man: Battle for New York	Simian Sentry		
2006	The Lord of the Rings: The Battle for Middle-earth II - The Rise of the Witch-king	Rogash, Troll of the North, King Arvedui	Credited as Greg Berger	
2007	Kingdom Hearts II: Final Mix+	Eeyore		
2007	Pirates of the Caribbean: At World's End	Cursed Pirates		
2007	Uncharted: Drake's Fortune	Mercenary		
2007	Lost Odyssey	Adjutant General, Barkeeper, Citizen		
2008	Spider-Man: Web of Shadows	Kingpin		
2008	Wacky Races: Crash and Dash	Race Commentator		
2008	Dissidia: Final Fantasy	Jecht		
2009	Halo Wars	Captain James Gregory Cutter, additional voices		
2009	X-Men Origins: Wolverine	Blob		
2009	Infamous	Male Pedestrian		
2009	Uncharted 2: Among Thieves	Serbian Soldiers		
2009	Brütal Legend	Glitter Fists, Ratguts		
2009	James Cameron's Avatar: The Game	RDA		
2010	Spider-Man: Shattered Dimensions	Additional voices		
2011	Dissidia 012: Final Fantasy	Jecht		
2011	Kinect: Disneyland Adventures	Eeyore		
2011	Final Fantasy XIII-2	Additional voices		
2011	Star Wars: The Old Republic	Additional voices		
2012	Metal Gear Solid: Snake Eater 3D	The Pain		
2012	Resident Evil: Operation Raccoon City	Harley, Nemesis		
2012	Transformers: Fall of Cybertron	Grimlock		
2012	Guild Wars 2	Conrad, Duggadoo, Jotun Smasher, Master of Peace		
2012	Dishonored	Propaganda Officer		
2013	The Last of Us	Additional voices		
2013	Skylanders: Swap Force	Magna Charge	Uncredited	
2013	Lightning Returns: Final Fantasy XIII	Diviner II, Shady Dealer		
2014	Transformers: Rise of the Dark Spark	Grimlock, Lockdown		
2014	Skylanders: Trap Team	Slobber Trap, Magna Charge		
2015	Skylanders: SuperChargers	Magna Charge		
2015	Transformers: Devastation	Grimlock, Long Haul		
2016	Call of Duty: Infinite Warfare	Additional voices	Credited as Gregg A. Berger	
2016	Final Fantasy XV	Additional voices		
2017	Mass Effect: Andromeda	Additional voices	Credited as Greg Berger	
2017	Minecraft: Story Mode - Season 2	Oxblood		
2017	Agents of Mayhem	Hammersmith (Magnus Torrison), Umberto Bellini, Gaunt Delivery Driver		
2018	Dissidia Final Fantasy NT	Jecht		
2018	Spyro Reignited Trilogy	Ripto, Crush, Gulp		
2019	Crash Team Racing: Nitro-Fueled	Additional voices		
2022	Nickelodeon Kart Racers 3: Slime Speedway	Odie		
2025	Disney Speedstorm	Eeyore		

=== Live-action ===
Year	Title	Role	Notes	Source
1978	Attack of the Killer Tomatoes!	Sergeant		
1978	Libra	Senator Gordon	Short Film	
1980	The Stunt Man		Uncredited	
1980	G.I.'s	Pvt. T.J. Witherspoon	Television film	
1981	Lou Grant	Reporter #2	Episode: "Violence"	
1981	One Day at a Time	Airline Attendant	Episode: "Airport"	
1982	Too Close for Comfort	Bellhop	Episode: "The Last Weekend"	
1982	Fame	The Comedian	Episode: "But Seriously Folks"	
1984	The Sheriff and the Astronaut	John Fitch	Television film	
1985	Alice	Policeman 2	Episode: "Alice Doesn't Work Here Anymore: Part 2"	
1986	Inside Out	Larry	Credited as Greg Berger	
1987	St. Elsewhere	Dr. Van Werner	5 episodes	
1987	How to Party	Announcer	Direct-to-video	
1987	Roxie	Dr. Abduneur	Episode: "Group Therapy"	
1988	Perfect Strangers	Clerk	Episode: "The Lottery"	
1988	L.A. Law	Mitchell Noyes	Episode: "Sperminator"	
1989	Quantum Leap	Parker	Episode: "What Price Gloria? - October 16, 1961"	
1990	Spaced Invaders	Klembecker		
1990	Night Court	Man Guilty of Littering	Episode: "Still Another Day in the Life"; uncredited	
1991	She-Wolf of London	Dirk	Episode: "Eclipse"	
1991	The New WKRP in Cincinnati	Mr. Felder	Episode: "Cincinnati's Favorite Couple"	
1992	Running Mates	Tabloid Reporter	Television film	
1992	Majority Rule	TV Trainer	Television film	
1992	Bob	Taggart	Episode: "A Christmas Story"	
1994	Police Academy: Mission to Moscow	Lt. Talinsky		
1995	The Boys Are Back	Randy	Episode: "Bad Hair Day"	
1995	WWE Raw	Cornfed Pig	Voice, episode: "Duckman Crossover"	
1996–1998	Frasier	Movie Narrator, Baby the Cockatoo, Gordon	Voice, 3 episodes; uncredited	
2000-2001	The Amanda Show	Various Roles	Episodes: "19" and "28"	
2000	The Brainiacs.com	Mr. Toller	Direct-to-video	
2006	Dreamgirls	Chicago Deejay		
2012	Slagacon '12	Grimlock	Short Film	
2018	Transformers: Autobots Alliance	Grimlock	Short Film	
2019	Alita: Battle Angel	Deckman		

=== Theme parks ===
Year	Title	Role	Notes	Source
1999, 2003	The Many Adventures of Winnie the Pooh	Eeyore	Opened at Magic Kingdom in 1999 and Disneyland in 2003	
2000	Men in Black: Alien Attack	Doofus Narrator, Do-Right Narrator	Ride at Universal Studios Florida	
