= Cathy's Last Resort =

1988 animated television special

- Created by: Cathy Guisewite
- Written by: Cathy Guisewite
- Directed by: Evert Brown
- Voices of: Kathleen Wilhoite; Robert F. Paulsen; Emily Levine; Shirley Mitchell; William L. Guisewite; Frank Welker; Allison Argo; Gregg Berger; Heather Kerr; Jamie E. Smith
- Music by: James Lee Stanley
- Country of origin: United States
- Original language: English

Production
- Executive producer: Lee Mendelson
- Producer: Bill Melendez
- Editors: Chuck McCann; Warren Taylor
- Camera setup: Nick Vasu
- Running time: 24 minutes
- Production companies: Mendelson–Melendez Productions; Universal Press Syndicate

Original release
- Network: CBS
- Release: November 11, 1988

Related
- Cathy; Cathy's Valentine

Cathy's Last Resort is a 1988 animated television special based on the Cathy comic strip by Cathy Guisewite. It features Kathleen Wilhoite as the voice of Cathy Andrews, and was written by Guisewite, executive producer Lee Mendelson, produced by Bill Melendez, and directed by Evert Brown. This special premiered after the episode "The NASA Space Station" of This Is America, Charlie Brown.

== Plot ==
Cathy's preparations for an idyllic, romantic vacation with her boyfriend, Irving, go awry.

== Voices ==
- Kathleen Wilhoite as Cathy Andrews
- Robert F. Paulsen as Irving Hillman
- Emily Levine as Charlene
- Shirley Mitchell as Anne - Cathy's Mom
- William L. Guisewite as Bill - Cathy's Dad
- Frank Welker as Steve
- Allison Argo as Andrea
- Gregg Berger as Mr. Pinkley
- Heather Kerr as Airline Clerk
- Jamie E. Smith as Zenith (credited as Jamie Neal)
