= Cathy's Valentine =

1989 animated television special

- Created by: Cathy Guisewite
- Written by: Cathy Guisewite
- Directed by: Evert Brown
- Voices of: Kathleen Wilhoite; Rob Paulsen; Shirley Mitchell; Jerry Houser; Allison Argo; William L. Guisewite; Gregg Berger; Emily Levine; Susan Silo; Loren Dunsworth; Sheryl Bernstein; Jamie E. Smith; Jeremy Frey
- Music by: James Lee Stanley
- Country of origin: United States
- Original language: English

Production
- Executive producer: Lee Mendelson
- Producer: Bill Melendez
- Editors: Chuck McCann; Warren Taylor; Gordon Brenner
- Camera setup: Nick Vasu
- Running time: 24 minutes
- Production companies: Mendelson–Melendez Productions; Universal Press Syndicate

Original release
- Network: CBS
- Release: February 10, 1989

Related
- Cathy Cathy's Last Resort

Cathy's Valentine is a 1989 animated television special based on the Cathy comic strip by Cathy Guisewite. It features Kathleen Wilhoite as the voice of Cathy Andrews, and was written by Guisewite, executive-produced by Lee Mendelson, produced by Bill Melendez, and directed by Evert Brown. This special premiered after This Is America, Charlie Brown: The Building of the Transcontinental Railroad.

== Plot ==
As Valentine's Day approaches, Cathy, ever the romantic, becomes passionately consumed with thoughts of hearts, flowers and candle-lit dinners. On the other hand, her boyfriend Irving seeks to maintain his independence. They begin to ponder the nature of their relationship while stumbling into further misadventures and whimsical misunderstandings.

== Voices ==
- Kathleen Wilhoite as Cathy Andrews
- Rob Paulsen as Irving Hillman (credited as Robert F. Paulsen)
- Shirley Mitchell as Anne - Cathy's Mom
- Jerry Houser as Ross
- Allison Argo as Andrea
- William L. Guisewite as Bill - Cathy's Dad
- Gregg Berger as Mr. Pinkley
- Emily Levine as Charlene
- Susan Silo as Janet
- Loren Dunsworth as Lisa
- Sheryl Bernstein as Joyce
- Jamie E. Smith as Zenith
- Jeremy Frey as Additional Voices
