= Kathleen Wilhoite =

American actress and musician

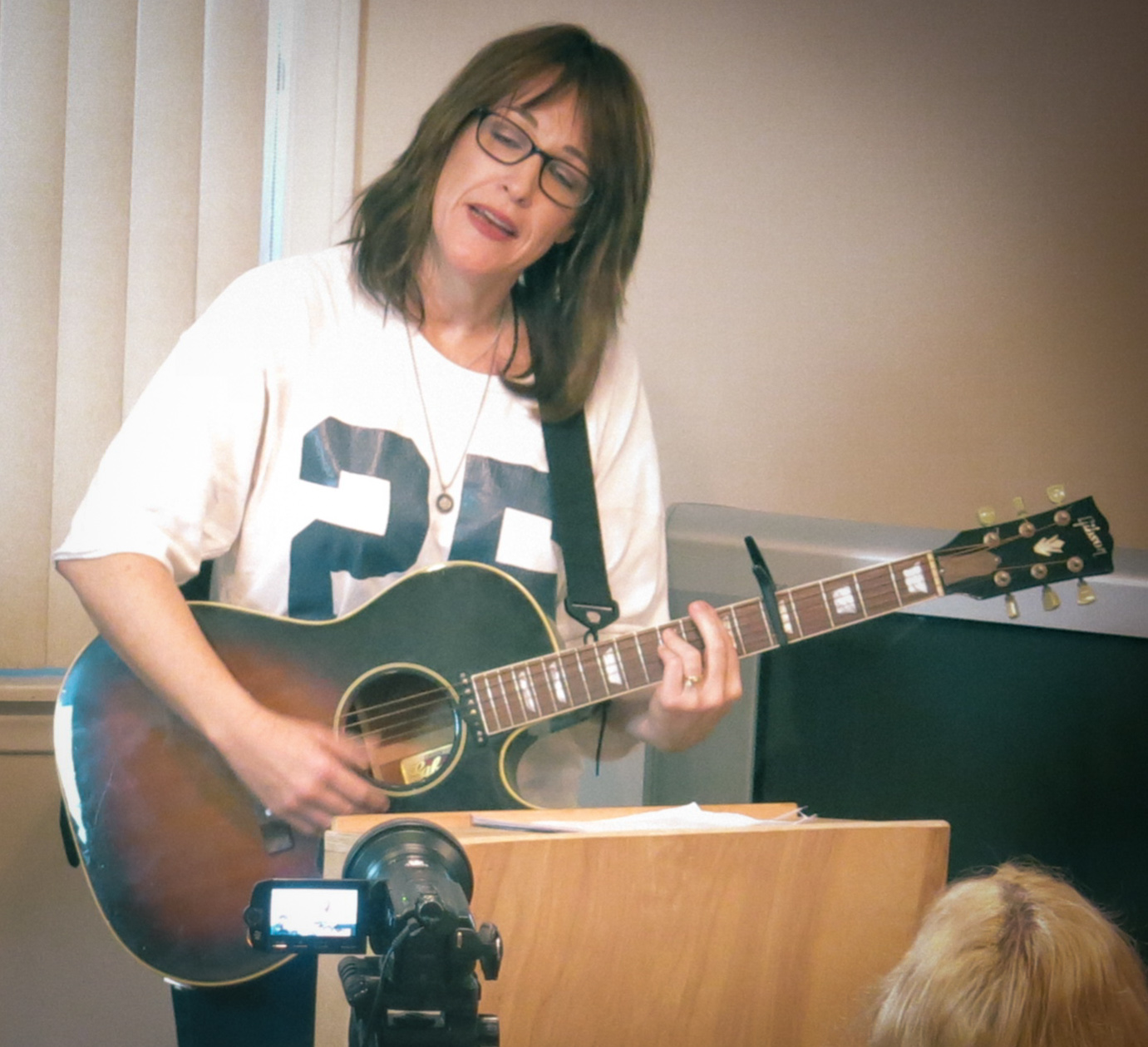
- Wilhoite in 2014
- Born: June 29, 1964 (age 62); Santa Barbara, California, U.S.
- Occupations: Actress, singer, songwriter, musician
- Years active: 1983–present
- Spouse: David Harte (m. 1997)
- Children: 3

Kathleen Wilhoite (born June 29, 1964) is an American actress and musician. She made her feature film debut in Private School (1983) before having a leading role in Murphy's Law (1986), followed by supporting parts in Witchboard (also 1986), Crossing Delancey (1988), Road House (1989), and Lorenzo's Oil (1992). She also had notable guest-starring roles on several series during this time, including Twin Peaks (1990).

Beginning in 1994, Wilhoite appeared as Chloe Lewis in a recurring guest-starring role on the series ER, and voiced the role of the titular character on the ABC animated series Pepper Ann (1997–2001). Other notable film roles during the 1990s include the science fiction thriller Fire in the Sky (1993), and the survival film The Edge (1997).

In 2003, she was cast in a recurring role as Liz Danes on Gilmore Girls, and has subsequently had guest-starring roles on Criminal Minds (2008), Grey's Anatomy (2009), and Jane the Virgin (2015). In 2019, Wilhoite guest-starred on an episode of the Netflix series The OA.

== Early life ==
Kathleen Wilhoite was born June 29, 1964, in Santa Barbara, California. She began acting in theatrical productions as a child with the Santa Barbara Youth Theatre. She attended the University of Southern California before studying acting at the Lee Strasberg Institute in Los Angeles.

== Career ==
=== 1983–1997: Early work ===
Wilhoite made her film debut in Private School (1983), and the same year appeared in the television film Quarterback Princess. She subsequently had guest roles on the television series The Jeffersons and Cagney & Lacey (both 1985). In 1986, she had a lead role in the film Murphy's Law, directed by J. Lee Thompson, as well as a supporting part as a psychic in the supernatural horror film Witchboard.

Wilhoite starred in two theatrical productions for New York City's Second Stage Theater in 1987: Division Street and Moonchildren. For her performance in the latter, critic Frank Rich of The New York Times praised her "frisky comic style" and likened her to "Shirley MacLaine in that star's earliest show-biz incarnation." Wilhoite also provided the voice of Cathy Andrews in the CBS animated TV special Cathy (1987) based on the comic strips by Cathy Guisewite which the show won a primetime Emmy for outstanding animated program, and its two sequels; Cathy's Last Resort (1988) and Cathy's Valentine (1989). This was followed by supporting film roles in Angel Heart (1987), the comedy Crossing Delancey (1988), and a lead role in the British-set horror film Dream Demon (also 1988), opposite Jemma Redgrave. Next, Wilhoite appeared in the Patrick Swayze-starring Road House (1989), Curtis Hanson's neo-noir Bad Influence (1990), and the drama Lorenzo's Oil (1992). She also appeared on television, portraying a resident of the titular town in David Lynch's series Twin Peaks in 1990.

Between 1993 and 1994, Wilhoite appeared in the seventh and eight seasons of L.A. Law as Rosalie Hendrickson Stulwicz. Beginning in 1994, she was cast in a recurring guest role as Chloe Lewis on ER, a role she continued to play for the following eight years. In 1995, she won a Q Award for her performance on the series, in the category of Outstanding Specialty Player by the Viewers for Quality Television. In film, Wilhoite portrayed the wife of a man who experiences alien abduction in Fire in the Sky (1993), followed by supporting parts in the drama Color of Night (1994) and the survival thriller The Edge (1997), starring Anthony Hopkins and Alec Baldwin.

=== 1997–2010: Film and television ===
Wilhoite provided the voice of the titular character of the Disney animated series Pepper Ann, a role she began in 1997 and portrayed until the series' conclusion in 2001. In 2000, she appeared in several feature films, including the dark comedies Nurse Betty and Drowning Mona, as well as the drama Pay It Forward.

In the early 2000s, Wilhoite guest-starred on several series, including a voice role in Family Guy (2001), 24 (2002) and Will & Grace (2003). Beginning in late 2003, Wilhoite guest-starred in a recurring role on the series Gilmore Girls, portraying Liz Danes, the sister of Luke Danes (Scott Patterson).

In May 2006, Wilhoite wrote and performed a one-woman show, Stop Yellin', directed by Kathy Najimy. The show consisted of autobiographical monologues and performances of songs from her albums. She subsequently had a supporting part in the comedy King of California (2007), starring Michael Douglas and Evan Rachel Wood. Guest-starring television credits in the late 2000s included Criminal Minds (2008) and Grey's Anatomy (2009).

Wilhoite has also narrated a number of audiobooks, including Maria Semple's Where'd You Go, Bernadette and Today Will Be Different.

=== 2013–present: Later roles ===
In 2013, Wilhoite had a supporting part in the romantic comedy Crazy Kind of Love, followed by a central role in the independent drama A Sort of Homecoming (2015). Also in 2015, she guest-starred on the comedy series Jane the Virgin, followed by a guest role on the fantasy series Kevin (Probably) Saves the World in 2018. Beginning in 2018, she provided the voice of Sue Peltzer in the Cartoon Network animated series Summer Camp Island, and in 2019 had a guest-starring role on the Netflix series The OA.

== Music ==
As a musician, Wilhoite released two albums, Pitch Like a Girl (1997, Daves' Record Company) and Shiva (2000, Ruby Ray Records). Her songs have been in such films as Murphy's Law (1986), which she also starred in; her songs have also appeared in Road House (1989), Valerie Flake (1999), East of A (2000), and Touched by an Angel (2000), as well as on the television series Buffy the Vampire Slayer. ("Wish We Never Met" from Pitch Like a Girl appeared in the season three episode "Consequences".)

== Personal life ==
Wilhoite married musician David Harte in 1997, with whom she has three children: a son named James, a daughter named Ruby and a son named Adugna, adopted from Ethiopia by Wilhoite and Harte in the early 2010s.

== Filmography ==
=== Film ===
Year	Title	Role	Notes
1983	Private School	Betsy Newhouse	
1986	Murphy's Law	Arabella McGee	
1986	The Morning After	Red	
1986	Witchboard	Sarah 'Zarabeth' Crawford	
1987	Angel Heart	Nurse	
1987	Campus Man	Molly Gibson	
1987	Under Cover	Corrinne Armour	
1988	Dream Demon	Jenny Hoffman	
1988	Crossing Delancey	Myla Bondy	
1989	Road House	Carrie Ann	
1989	Brenda Starr	Hank O'Hare	
1990	Everybody Wins	Amy	
1990	Bad Influence	Leslie	
1992	Lorenzo's Oil	Deirdre Murphy	
1993	Fire in the Sky	Katie Rogers	
1994	Benders	Terri	
1994	Getting Even with Dad	Kitty Gleason	
1994	Color of Night	Michelle	
1997	The Edge	Ginny	
1997	The Maze	Mira	
2000	Drowning Mona	Lucinda	
2000	East of A	Spark	
2000	Nurse Betty	Sue Ann Rogers	
2000	Angels!	Georgeanne	
2000	Pay It Forward	Bonnie	
2003	Quicksand	Beth Ann	
2003	Welcome to the Neighborhood	Jennifer	
2004	Perfect Opposites	Terri Curtis	
2005	Firecracker	Jessica	
2007	King of California	Kelly	
2008	Winged Creatures	Jenn	AKA, Fragments
2009	Endless Bummer	Peggy	
2012	California Solo	Catherine	
2013	Crazy Kind of Love	Doris	
2015	A Sort of Homecoming	Annie Landry	
2015	Deathly	Dianne	Short film
2016	The Dog Lover	Mrs. Gold	
2017	The Ride	Amanda	
2021	Violet	Waitress (Jones)	

=== Television ===
Year	Title	Role	Notes
1983	Quarterback Princess	Carolyn	TV film
1984	AfterMASH	Sandy	Episode: "Yours Truly, Max Klinger", "It Had to Be You"
1984	Family Ties	Kathy	Episode: "Ready or Not"
1984	Flight 90: Disaster on the Potomac	Kelly Duncan	TV film
1984	Single Bars, Single Women	Dee Dee	TV film
1985	Not My Kid	Penny	TV film
1985	The Jeffersons	Robin	Episode: "State of Mind"
1985	Cagney & Lacey	Adrien Wickart	"On the Street"
1986	CBS Schoolbreak Special	Paulie	"Have You Tried Talking to Patty?"
1986	Fame	Roberta	Episode: "W.S.O.A."
1986	Heart of the City	Mary / Tiger Lady	Episode: "Cold Steal and Neon"
1986	Throb	Tina Toxoid	Episode: "My Fair Punker Lady"
1987	Cathy	Cathy Andrews (voice)	TV film
1988	Heartbeat	Wendy Moran	Episode: "Pilot"
1988	Cathy's Last Resort	Cathy Andrews (voice)	TV film
1989	Cathy's Valentine	Cathy Andrews (voice)	TV film
1990	Cop Rock	Patricia Spence	3 episodes
1990	Twin Peaks	Gwen Moran	Episode: "Drive with a Dead Girl"
1992	Crossroads	Selena	Episode: "Miles Away from Home"
1992	Live! From Death Row	Lorraine	TV film
1992	Quantum Leap	Norma Jean Pilcher	Episode: "Moments to Live"
1993	When Love Kills: The Seduction of John Hearn	Cheryl	TV film
1993	Broken Promises: Taking Emily Back	Lily Ward	TV film
1993–1994	L.A. Law	Rosalie Hendrickson Stulwicz	Recurring role (seasons 7–8)
1994–2002	ER	Chloe Lewis	Recurring role (seasons 1–2, 8)
1996	Mad About You	Iris	2 episodes
1996	Terror in the Family	Judith	TV film
1997	Crisis Center	Sarah Morrow	Episode: "Where Truth Lies"
1997	Perversions of Science	Paula	Episode: "Snap Ending"
1997	Breast Men	Timmie Jean Lindsey	TV film
1997–2001	Pepper Ann	Pepper Ann Pearson (voice)	65 episodes
1998	Ally McBeal	Janie Bittner	Episode: "Body Language"
1999	L.A. Doctors	Claire Elliott	Episode: "Been There, Done That"
1999	Maggie Winters	Self	Episode: "Girls Night Out"
2000	Family Law	Janel March	Episode: "Metamorphosis"
2000	Touched by an Angel	Kathy Benson	Episode: "An Angel on My Tree"
2001	Family Guy	Sam (voice)	Episode: "To Love and Die in Dixie"
2001	Law & Order: Special Victims Unit	Jane Rudd	Episode: "Care"
2002	24	Lauren Proctor	Episode: "8:00 a.m.-9:00 a.m."
2002	My Sister's Keeper	Mona	TV film
2002	Philly	Lori Miller	Episode: "Tall Tales"
2002	Third Watch	Chloe Lewis	Episode: "Unleashed"
2002	For the People	Maxine Darwell	Episode: "Dog Day"
2002	3-South	Cindy (voice)	3 episodes
2003	Boomtown	Sally McBride	Episode: "Sinaloa Cowboys"
2003	Judging Amy	Nancy Gilbert	Episode: "The Best Interests of the Child"
2003	Will & Grace	Sally	Episode: "Fagmalion Part 3: Bye Bye Beardy"
2003	The Division	Christine Phillips	Episode: "Wish You Were Here"
2003	Audrey's Rain	Marguerite Walker	TV film
2004	Family Sins	Nadine Devereaux	TV film
2004	Century City	Laura	Episode: "A Mind Is a Terrible Thing to Lose"
2004	The 4400	Grace Morrissey	Episode: "The New and Improved Carl Morrissey"
2004–2007	Gilmore Girls	Liz Danes	16 episodes
2005	Charmed	Nadine	Episode: "The Seven Year Witch"
2006	Boston Legal	Sophia Wilson	Episode: "The Nutcrackers"
2007	Ghost Whisperer	Valerie Parker	Episode: "Children of Ghosts"
2008	The Cleaner	Irene Kemp	Episode: "Rag Dolls"
2008	Criminal Minds	Kathy Evanson	Episode: "Minimal Loss"
2009	Without a Trace	Sherri Brinkman	Episode: "Wanted"
2009	The New Adventures of Old Christine	Mrs. Dee Sellick	Episode: "Hair"
2009	In Plain Sight	Ingrid Berrenson	Episode: "A Frond in Need"
2009	Grey's Anatomy	Leslie Goldman	Episode: "Invasion"
2009	Ice Dreams	Debra Laston	TV film
2010	The Mentalist	Margo Ketchum	Episode: "Red Sky in the Morning"
2011	The Defenders	Natalie	Episode: "Nevada v. Wayne"
2011	The Glades	Mrs. Wyatt	Episode: "Iron Pipeline"
2014	Jennifer Falls	Cheryl	Episode: "Triangle"
2015	Jane the Virgin	Wendy	Episode: "Chapter Sixteen"
2015	Battle Creek	Susan	Episode: "Stockholm"
2017	Wisdom of the Crowd	Karen Sanford	Episode: "Trojan Horse"
2018	Kevin (Probably) Saves the World	Phoebe Powell	Episode: "Caught White-Handed"
2018	The Resident	Claudia Webb	Episode: "Run, Doctor, Run"
2018–2020	Summer Camp Island	Sue Peltzer (voice)	7 episodes
2019	The OA	Amy Broderick	Episode: "Mirror Mirror"
2020	Yellowstone	Carolyn Nelson	Episode: "Cowboys and Dreamers"
2022	CSI: Vegas	Dr. Diane Auerbach	3 episodes
2025	Murdaugh: Death in the Family	Gloria Satterfield	Miniseries

== Stage credits ==
Year	Title	Role	Notes	Ref.
1987	Division Street		Second Stage Theater	
1987	Moonchildren	Shelly	Second Stage Theater	

== Discography ==
Year	Album	Songs	Performers
1998	Pitch Like a Girl	1. "Whatever It Takes" (4:24); 2. "No One Can Touch Me" (4:47); 3. "Wish We Never Met" (4:36); 4. "Olivia Says" (3:56); 5. "Symphony" (5:00); 6. "Suck the Joy" (3:45); 7. "Look But Don't Touch" (4:31); 8. "Dumb Ol' Girl" (3:39); 9. "Old Familiar" (4:13); 10. "Yard Sale" (5:28); 11. "Stop Yelling" (3:49); 12. "Pick Up Where You Left Off" (4:01)	Kathleen Wilhoite - vocals, acoustic guitar, piano Tony Gilkyson - guitars Chris Wagner - bass David Harte - drums, background vocals Chris Joyner - piano Chris Frankfort - lap steel Nikka Costa - background vocals
2000	Shiva	1. "Witches' Hill" (4:29); 2. "Ground Zero" (4:06); 3. "Back Home" (4:58); 4. "I Stopped Asking" (3:29); 5. "Safari Song" (4:06); 6. "It Ain't My Fault" (3:46); 7. "On My Couch" (4:02); 8. "You Move Me" (4:20); 9. "Stone Cold Alone" (3:23); 10. "Bad Old Days" (3:49); 11. "Long Lost Man" (3:48)	
