= Cathy (1987 TV film) =

1987 animated television special

- Created by: Cathy Guisewite
- Based on: Cathy by Cathy Guisewite
- Written by: Cathy Guisewite
- Directed by: Evert Brown
- Voices of: Kathleen Wilhoite; Robert F. Paulsen; Allison Argo; Shirley Mitchell; Emily Levine; Gregg Berger; Desiree Goyette; William L. Guisewite; Robert Towers
- Music by: James Lee Stanley
- Country of origin: United States
- Original language: English

Production
- Executive producer: Lee Mendelson
- Producer: Bill Melendez
- Editors: Chuck McCann; Julie Gustafson; Warren Taylor
- Camera setup: Nick Vasu
- Running time: 24 minutes
- Production companies: Mendelson–Melendez Productions; Universal Press Syndicate

Original release
- Network: CBS
- Release: May 15, 1987

Related
- Cathy's Last Resort Cathy's Valentine

Cathy is a 1987 animated television special based on the Cathy comic strip by Cathy Guisewite. It features Kathleen Wilhoite as the voice of Cathy Andrews, and was written by Guisewite, executive-produced by Lee Mendelson, produced by Bill Melendez, and directed by Evert Brown.

The special won the Primetime Emmy Award for Outstanding Animated Program. It was followed by Cathy's Last Resort (1988) and Cathy's Valentine (1989).

== Plot ==
Cathy Andrews is an unmarried woman who dreams of having both a career as president of a conglomerate and a relationship with "Mr. Right," a man who is sensitive, nurturing and sexy. While claiming the 1980s are a golden age to be single, she is envious seeing her friends becoming engaged in droves. She justifies her casual relationship with a man named Irving to her mother, but everyone is disappointed Irving will not be attending her workplace awards ceremony, where Cathy is nominated for employee of the year. One Saturday night, she visits Irving's apartment, to find he is entertaining another woman, Brenda. Although both women storm out on Irving, Cathy returns, and Irving attempts to explain himself. Despite momentarily thinking the affair was brief, Cathy looks into Irving's refrigerator and finds butter on a plate, lasagna and ice trays filled, and realizes it has gone on for weeks.

Cathy's friend Andrea takes her out to look for another man, despite her mother's insistence she stay in the apartment and wait for Irving to call. When Cathy returns, she is disappointed to find her answering machine blank. After a failed attempt to look through personal ads, she accepts a blind date, but Andrea drives the man away with Mace when he arrives, sees them both, and jokes about having two women. When Irving calls to get his possessions back, Cathy tells him to meet her at the awards ceremony, where she wins employee of the year. They then dance.

== Voices ==
- Kathleen Wilhoite as Cathy Andrews
- Robert F. Paulsen as Irving Hillman
- Allison Argo as Andrea
- Shirley Mitchell as Anne - Cathy's Mom
- Emily Levine as Charlene
- Gregg Berger as Mr. Pinkley
- Desirée Goyette as Brenda
- William L. Guisewite as Bill - Cathy's Dad
- Robert Towers as Emcee

== Production ==
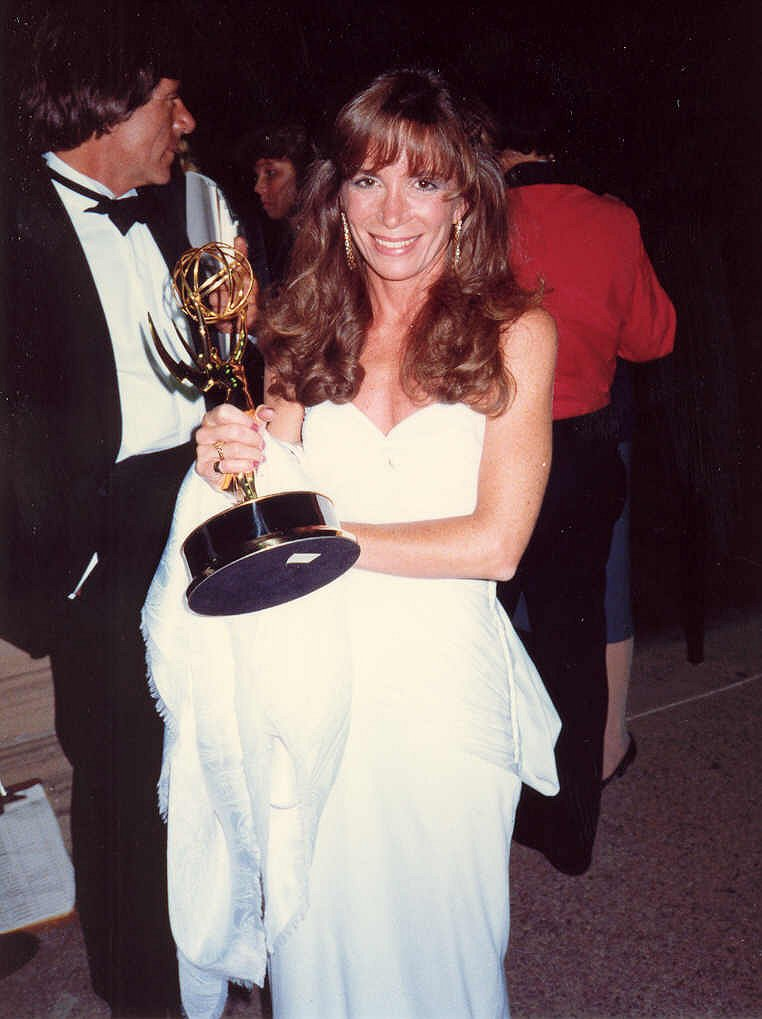
Cathy Guisewite with her Emmy Award.

At the time a Cathy special was announced, the comic strip was being published in 500 newspapers. Producer Lee Mendelson contacted creator Cathy Guisewite about making a television special, which was ultimately produced with Bill Melendez.

Guisewite acknowledged her comic was receiving complaints, saying, "The last thing that the world needs is another vulnerable woman," and expressing surprise that a woman would write such a comic. The storyline of the special was created to reflect the character's vulnerability, with Guisewite saying that, despite complaints, her readers liked it. She stated, "The strip is how I work out my anxieties," and that she felt her best comics are drawn from this.

== Broadcast ==
Cathy was initially broadcast on CBS on May 15, 1987. It followed Blondie and Dagwood, another animated special based on a comic strip, Blondie, with regular series pre-empted. Before the special aired, Cathy Guisewite and her mother Anne Guisewite visited Chicago in May 1987 to promote the special and Anne Guisewite's book, Motherly Advice from Cathy's Mom.

Cathy's Last Resort and Cathy's Valentine followed on November 11, 1988, and February 10, 1989, respectively.

== Reception ==
John J. O'Connor, writing for The New York Times, wrote "Cathy is the animated equivalent of clever, sophisticate sitcom. It fits snugly into network prime time." Cathy won the Primetime Emmy Award for Outstanding Animated Program in 1987.
