= Breast Men =

1997 television film directed by Lawrence O'Neil

- Film poster
- Written by: John Stockwell
- Directed by: Lawrence O'Neil
- Starring: David Schwimmer; Chris Cooper
- Music by: Dennis McCarthy
- Country of origin: United States
- Original language: English

Production
- Producers: Gary Lucchesi; Guy Riedel
- Cinematography: Robert M. Stevens
- Editor: Michael Jablow
- Running time: 96 minutes

Original release
- Network: HBO
- Release: December 13, 1997

Breast Men is a 1997 American semibiographical dark comedy-drama television film written by John Stockwell and directed by Lawrence O'Neil for HBO.

== Plot ==
Dr. Kevin Saunders and Dr. William Larson pioneer the usage of silicone breast implants. Saunders comes up with the idea of the breast implant. Larson tries to dissuade him, but eventually comes around. Saunders and Larson gain immense financial success as cosmetic breast augmentation surgeries rise in acceptance and frequency in American culture, but follow different life paths thereafter: Dr. Saunders becoming a narcissist interested in developing and implanting the exaggeratedly larger-sized types of implants popular with a mostly exotic dancer and female porn-star clientele, often having sex and doing drugs with them. Doctor Larson, Saunders's former mentor and business partner, is portrayed as continuing to pursue a more serious, clinical approach (e.g., reconstructive breast surgeries for female breast cancer survivors, etc.). Complications arise with the implants and the doctors are sued, leading to their fall from grace. Larson dies in his home of a heart attack and Saunders dies when his car crashes into a truck as his attention wanders when he looks at a woman's breasts.

== Cast ==
- David Schwimmer as Dr. Kevin Saunders
- Chris Cooper as Dr. William Larson
- Emily Procter as Laura Pierson
- Matt Frewer as Gerald Krzemien
- Terry O'Quinn as Hersch Lawyer
- Kathleen Wilhoite as Timmie Jean Lindsey
- John Stockwell as Robert Renaud
- Lisa Marie as Vanessa
- Louise Fletcher as Mrs. Saunders
- Michael Cavanaugh as Harry
- Michael Chieffo as Dave
- Leigh-Allyn Baker as Implant Removal Patient
- Fred Willard as Talk Show Host
- Lyle Lovett as Research Scientist
- Rena Riffel as Swimming Pool Girl
- Tim Payovich as David Schwimmer's Buttocks

== Historical accuracy ==
The film very loosely tracks the history of the real-life breast implant phenomenon, from its radical introduction through its widespread popularity. The movie continues to the Food and Drug Administration's determination that silicone implants cause various illnesses and cancers, spawning federal regulations that forced the industry to switch to saline implants. The story is interspersed with interview snippets of women from the 1970s who underwent breast augmentations with varying degrees of success, including their likes and dislikes about them. The interviews are marked by the fact that they show only the interviewees' nude breasts and torso.

In reality, silicone implants were developed by Texas-based plastic surgeons Drs. Frank Gerow and Thomas Cronin.

== Production ==
Much of the filming was done in Galveston, Texas, and includes numerous interior and exterior shots of historic Star Drug, a drug store and soda fountain with a distinctive vintage ceramic Coca-Cola sign displayed over its front door. Star Drug burned in 1998 but has since been rebuilt. Limited footage is shown, as well, of the University of Texas Medical Branch campus.

== Reception ==
The film was released to mixed reviews. On the review aggregator website Rotten Tomatoes, 50% of 6 critics' reviews are positive.
