= Disney Learning: Winnie the Pooh =

- Winnie the Pooh preschool game
- Genre: Educational
- Developer: Disney Interactive
- Publisher: Disney Interactive
- Platforms: Microsoft Windows, PlayStation
- Parent series: Winnie the Pooh

Disney Learning: Winnie the Pooh comprises three titles: Winnie The Pooh Toddler, Winnie the Pooh Preschool and Winnie The Pooh Kindergarten. They are point-and-click educational video games developed and published by Disney Interactive and based on the Winnie the Pooh franchise. The titles were shipped by BAM! Entertainment.

== Gameplay ==
The games were designed to emulate the plots of the television series and films, while adding an adventure game interface that allowed players to complete educational activities to advance the story. Some games intended to teach kids about languages other than English. For instance, Owl's Magnificent Machine in Toddler taught players the Spanish and French equivalent of the objects they identified. BusinessWire reported that "parents who register their purchased titles can unlock add-on packs from Disney Interactive", which included additional activities. Printable activities included coloring book pages, cutouts, name tags, bookmarks and flashcards.

== Plot ==
=== Winnie the Pooh Toddler ===
The game begins with Winnie the Pooh meeting up with his friends under a tree to decide what to do. Aside from the intro, there is actually no storyline as players can play the five available activates for as long as they like.

=== Winnie the Pooh Preschool ===
Pooh wakes up one morning, believing that something different is going to happen today; he soon concludes that the event is Eeyore's birthday. Pooh goes around the Hundred Acre Wood to tell everyone all about this, all while helping them with their errands. Once the player completes all six main activates, the party begins, but Eeyore reveals that today isn't really his birthday, making Pooh realize his mistake. The gang decides to turn the party from a birthday into a celebration of their friendship.

=== Winnie the Pooh Kindergarten ===
The story begins with Pooh and Piglet in front of Pooh's house waving goodbye to Christopher Robin as he leaves for school. When Pooh expresses his wish to attend school as well, Piglet suggests having school right in the Hundred Acre Wood, which Owl agrees to. Once the game is fully complete, the ending shows all the characters (including Christopher Robin, who had just returned from school) presenting Pooh with a graduation cap.

== Promotion ==
The games were included in the mobile showroom Disney Big Rig, which toured Southern and Northern California Wal-Mart stores in September and October 2000, along with Disney's Mickey Mouse Toddler, Disney's Mickey Mouse Preschool, Disney's Mickey Mouse Kindergarten, Disney/Pixar's Buzz Lightyear 1st Grade, Disney/Pixar's Buzz Lightyear 2nd Grade. Disney's Winnie the Pooh Kindergarten was included in Disney Interactive Channel. Toddler was included in the Disney Learning Toddler set, along with the Mickey Mouse Toddler game.

== Critical reception ==
PC Mag praised the series for its "cinematic animation", "creative story lines", "characters that exude personality", and a "fun-filled curriculum". The Washington Times said that the three titles taught "age-appropriate skills that emphasize creativity, discovery, working together and active participation".

=== Toddler ===
Edutaining Kids thought the game's graphics were "rich", and that it would add variety to a toddler's video game collection. In a preview, Kid's Domain gave the game an 8/10. The Boston Herald thought the game was good, though noted there was other, better toddler edutainment. New Straits Times' favourite part of the game was a karaoke-style activity. Jinny Gudmundsen of Choosing Children's Software thought the game was part of an era of "lapware", in which there was a focus on cause and effect; when the player moves the mouse or uses the keyboard they get an immediate response.

=== Preschool ===
DiscoverySchool gave Preschool Plus a 9 out of 10, noting that the engaging story adds to its replayability. SuperKids said the title wasn't "innovative", though recommended it as a solid educational game featuring a popular cast of characters. Ouders Online thought the game was entertaining, but not original. Allgame gave the title a rating of 4.5 stars out of 5, commenting that the graphics matched those of the TV series and movies.

=== Kindergarten ===
Superkids deemed the game "fast-paced", light-hearted", "easy to use", and "sure to please". The Cincinnati Post thought the game was "cute", but ultimately unable to capture the attention of young players for long stretches of time.

== See also ==
- Disney Learning: Mickey Mouse
