= Cathy =

American comic strip

- Cathy and Irving after being married. Electra and Vivian, their dogs, are also in the picture.
- Author: Cathy Guisewite
- Website: www.gocomics.com/cathy (reruns)
- Current status/schedule: Concluded daily strip
- Launch date: November 22, 1976
- End date: October 3, 2010
- Syndicate: Universal Press Syndicate/Universal Uclick
- Genre(s): Humor, gag-a-day

Cathy is an American gag-a-day comic strip, drawn by Cathy Guisewite from 1976 until 2010. The comic follows Cathy, a woman who struggles through the "four basic guilt groups" of life: food, love, family, and work. The strip gently pokes fun at the lives and foibles of modern women. The strip's debut was on November 22, 1976, and it appeared in over 1,400 newspapers at its peak. The strips have been compiled into more than 20 books. Three television specials were also created. Guisewite received the National Cartoonists Society Reuben Award in 1992 for the strip.

== History ==
Initially, the strip was based largely on Guisewite's own life as a single woman. "The syndicate felt it would make the strip more relatable if the character's name and my name were the same," Guisewite said in an interview. "They felt it would make it a more personal strip, and would help people know it was a real woman who was going through these things. I hated the idea of calling it 'Cathy'." Guisewite had Cathy's long-time boyfriend, Irving, propose on Valentine's Day 2004. The two characters married in the February 5, 2005 strip. That same year, Cathy appeared in the 75th anniversary party of Blondie and Dagwood.

On August 11, 2010, Cathy Guisewite announced the decision to end the run of Cathy. On October 3, 2010, the final strip ran with the revelation that Cathy was pregnant with a girl.

On June 1, 2020, Cathy Commiserations, a single-panel cartoon, began on GoComics. The earliest entry was dated March 20, 2018. The series paused May 9, 2021, but resumed on October 29, 2021.

== Main and supporting characters ==
- Cathy Andrews Hillman: the protagonist of the strip and the only one not shown with a nose (although a small one was occasionally seen in side views). Cathy is also the only character that does not have beady eyes; instead, hers are drawn in an inverted heart-shape.
- Andrea: Cathy's feminist foil and best friend. Andrea's role was reduced in the later years. Andrea is married to Luke, whom she met during an online chat, and has two children, Zenith and Gus, who grew from infants to uninhibited teens (not seen in the strips), illustrating—especially Zenith—that the characters do age, albeit very slowly. With Zenith, Andrea was obsessed with motherhood, to the point of eating special diets while pregnant and playing music on headphones into her pregnant womb to ensure her baby was born with a high IQ, and then bonding so tightly with Zenith that she understood her baby babble perfectly. Gus, however, entered a playgroup and she did not have as strong a connection with him (which initially left her distraught).
- Electra: Cathy's dog—rescued from the animal shelter as a puppy.
- Vivian: Irving's dog—also a rescue dog from the shelter. Both Cathy and Irving said that the dogs rescued them.
- Anne Andrews: Cathy's mother. Just as likely to provide frustration as inspiration. Refused to throw anything out, even online. Was highly marriage obsessed and was constantly either asking Cathy when she was getting married or trying to fix her up.
- Bill Andrews: Cathy's father. More often than not, a helpless bystander to Cathy's mom. Cathy went to him when she needed advice about work, something Cathy's mom (even though she had created jobs—M.O.Ms, Mothers on the Move, or Granny Nannies, the day-care centre in Flo's house) said she knows little about.
- Charlene McGuire: one of Cathy's best friends, receptionist at her office. Charlene's role expanded greatly once Andrea got married. Charlene announced her pregnancy on Sunday, May 20, 2007.
- Simon: Charlene's husband. He and Cathy dated ten times before she decided that he wasn't for her. But (at first) Cathy was adamant that Charlene should have adhered to the "woman's rules" one of which is to never date a woman's old boyfriend. He and Charlene broke up briefly, which led to both her and Cathy signing up for video dating, but they eventually got back together.
- Irving Hillman: former on-again-off-again love interest, golf and electronics addict and her husband as of February 5, 2005. The more complex the machinery, the better he liked it—even if he did not understand how to set it up.
- Mr. Earl Pinkley: Cathy's boss, who often managed to make what little control he actually had of his work environment go a very long way. At one point, he sexually harassed Cathy by coming on to her in her apartment. Cathy solved the problem by telling Charlene what really happened and the gossip about her boss "spending the night" (he forgot to mention it was because he was knocked out when Cathy punched him in the nose).
- Mrs. Hillman: Irving's mother. She did everything in her power to aggravate Cathy, especially regarding the 2007 Hillman family reunion.
- Mr. Hillman: Irving's father. He seemed content to let his wife do all the talking.
- Mabel: a Frank Nelson-type character who would show up as the waitress or salesperson at any given restaurant, store, bank, travel agency etc. that Cathy or other characters went to (including Andrea's nurse when she had Zenith), always had a pencil in her hair, and whose interactions would usually escalate until she or her customer had a meltdown. She sometimes had a co-worker with her. In at least one strip, the co-worker was referred to as Edith.
- Emerson was one of the first boyfriends introduced (Irving was first) when the strip debuted. He pursued Cathy who figured she could do better and irritated Irving. He was eventually dropped in favor of Irving, but is often mentioned in Cathy's list of those she dated.

== Animated specials ==
Three animated specials were made from the strip: Cathy, Cathy's Last Resort and Cathy's Valentine. All aired on CBS, and the former won Guisewite an Emmy Award.

== The four basic guilt groups ==
Defined by Cathy Guisewite, the four basic guilt groups are four types of temptation that the character Cathy faces in her daily life.

=== Food ===
Cathy has a love/hate affair with food (especially carbs). She loves food, but suffers from body dysmorphia from her weight. She is often shown in a department store fitting room trying to stuff herself into a bathing suit. She is overweight, but not obese, and has some success with weight loss over the course of the comic. Cathy is particularly fond of chocolate, pizza, and her mother's cooking.

=== Love ===
Cathy dates extensively, but is unable to find "Mr. Right." She has a number of love interests throughout the comic, though none more consistent than Irving. Later in the series, they marry. At the end of the comic series, Irving and Cathy find out that they are expecting a child.

=== Mom ===
Although well-meaning, Mom's advice often frustrates Cathy. Cathy is from the era of feminism, women's rights, and the sexual revolution. Mom is from the earlier, more conservative World War II—1950s era. Although presented as an equal in her marriage to Cathy's Dad, Mom holds many old-fashioned ideas. Prior to Cathy's marriage, she seems to have an obsession with seeing Cathy married, keeping a current copy of Bride magazine in her purse and trying to send Christmas cards to Cathy's ex-boyfriends.

=== Work ===
Cathy has to juggle many tasks at Product Testing, Inc. Her boss, Mr. Pinkley, often asks the impossible. Cathy always seems to pull through in the end and gives him and the client exactly what they want, albeit with quite a bit of drama.

== Books ==
Following are books featuring Cathy, illustrated by Guisewite. The chronological strips and special collections lists are believed to be complete; the other sections are not.

Note: capitalization appears according to the copyright page of the book.

=== Chronological strips ===
The following books are collections of strips in the order in which they were published.

- Cathy Chronicles (1979)
- "What do you mean, I still don't have equal rights??!" (1980)
- What's a Nice Girl Like You Doing With a Double Bed (March 1981, ISBN 0-553-01316-5)
- I think I'm having a Relationship with a Blueberry Pie! (1981, ISBN 0-553-01337-8)
- Another Saturday Night of Wild and Reckless Abandon (September 1982, ISBN 0-8362-1201-0)
- A Mouthful of Breath Mints and No One to Kiss (August 1983, ISBN 0-8362-1120-0)
- Men should come with instruction booklets (August 1984, ISBN 0-8362-2055-2)
- Wake me up when I'm a size 5 (July 1985, ISBN 0-8362-2069-2)
- Thin thighs in thirty years (July 1986, ISBN 0-8362-2081-1)
- A hand to hold, an opinion to reject (August 1987, ISBN 0-8362-2092-7)
- Why do the right words always come out of the wrong mouth? (August 1988, ISBN 0-8362-1808-6)
- My Granddaughter Has Fleas!! (August 1989, ISBN 0-8362-1855-8)
- $14 in the Bank and a $200 Face in My Purse (August 1990, ISBN 0-8362-1820-5)
- Only Love Can Break a Heart, But a Shoe Sale Can Come Close (August 1992, ISBN 0-8362-1893-0)
- Revelations From a 45-Pound Purse (August 1993, ISBN 0-8362-1722-5)
- The Child Within Has Been Awakened But the Old Lady on the Outside Just Collapsed (September 1994, ISBN 0-8362-1761-6)
- Understanding the "Why" Chromosome (August 1995, ISBN 0-8362-0423-9)
- Abs of Steel, Buns of Cinnamon (August 1997, ISBN 0-8362-3683-1)
- I Am Woman, Hear Me Snore (August 1998, ISBN 0-8362-6821-0)
- I'd Scream Except I Look So Fabulous (August 1999, ISBN 0-7407-0006-5)
- Shoes: Chocolate for the Feet (August 2000, ISBN 0-7407-0555-5)

=== Special collections ===
The following books include strips already published in earlier books.

- Reflections: A Fifteenth Anniversary Collection (January 1991, ISBN 0-8362-1877-9)
- Cathy Twentieth Anniversary Collection (September 1996, ISBN 0-8362-2523-6)
- Food (December 2001, ISBN 0-7407-2112-7)
- Love (December 2001, ISBN 0-7407-2061-9)
- Mom (December 2001, ISBN 0-7407-2060-0)
- Work (December 2001, ISBN 0-7407-2062-7)
- The Wedding of Cathy and Irving : A Cathy Collection (July 2005, ISBN 0-7407-2668-4)

=== Gift books ===
The following books are smaller than the works above. They may have a short storyline and are intended as gifts.

==== Hardback ====
- Commiserations (September 1993, ISBN 0-8362-3048-5)
- Like Mother, Like Daughter (September 1993, ISBN 0-8362-3049-3)
- Confessions to My Mother (March 1999, ISBN 0-8362-8788-6)
- Affirmations (May 1996, ISBN 0-8362-1058-1)
- Shop till you drop, then sit down and buy shoes (May 1996, ISBN 0-8362-1068-9)

==== Paperback ====
Paperback gift books.

- How to Get Rich, Fall in Love, Lose Weight, and Solve All Your Problems by Saying "No" (1983, ISBN 0-8362-1986-4)
- Eat Your Way to a Better Relationship (1983, ISBN 0-8362-1987-2)

=== Other books ===
The following books feature Cathy illustrations by Guisewite, but are not authored by her.

- Motherly Advice from Cathy's Mom, written by Anne Guisewite, Cathy Guisewite's mother (1987, ISBN 978-0836220919
- Dancing Through Life in a Pair of Broken Heels, written by Mickey Guisewite, Cathy Guisewite's sister (April 1994, ISBN 0-553-37377-3)
- Lifestyles of the Trim & Healthy, written by Matthew Bennett (June 1994, ISBN 0-9629502-9-7)
- Girl Food written by Barbara Albright & Cathy Guisewite (1997, ISBN 0-8362-3173-2)

== In popular culture ==
The June 18, 2017 strip of the relaunched Bloom County featured a dismayed Cathy awakening in bed alongside Steve Dallas. She also appeared in the strip the following day.

The comic strip Luann featured Mabel (in the October 5, 2016 strip) as a worker of the 'Bridal Barn' wedding gown store where Toni Daytona went to purchase her wedding gown with the help of Nancy and Luann DeGroot.

A live action Cathy sketch was included in the special Mother's Day Sunday Funnies broadcast May 8, 1983 on NBC.

Caroline in the City features fictional cartoonist Caroline Duffy (Lea Thompson), who makes a rival strip. The feud between Caroline and Cathy is described as "oily rag, lit cigarette". In the season 1 episode "Caroline and the Bad Back", Caroline hurts her back and is unable to meet a deadline. To prevent the newspapers from double running Cathy strips, Del (Eric Lutes) and Richard (Malcolm Gets) create one for Caroline. The strip is presented as being only funny to men. Upon seeing the strip, Caroline declares that: "Cathy is gonna have a field day with this".

In Sex and the City season 3, "Cock-a-Doodle-Doo", Miranda compares her lonely and repetitive take-out orders to a Cathy cartoon, and Carrie asks her never to refer to Cathy again, indicating Cathy's status by 2000 as a symbol of an earlier generation's sad, contemptuous view of single women. (Miranda: "I'm sitting home with my cat, ordering the same thing almost every night. The only thing sadder would be a Cathy comic pasted on my refrigerator door." Carrie: "Never say Cathy comic to me again").

On the series 30 Rock, Cathy has been referenced more than once. On the episode "Don Geiss, America and Hope", Liz Lemon's boyfriend Wesley compares her obsession with food to being like "a Cathy cartoon that just won't end". In another episode, Liz exclaims "Chocolate, chocolate, chocolate, aack!", which had been exclaimed by Cathy herself in an earlier strip.

On Saturday Night Live, Andy Samberg would portray Cathy as loud and obnoxious on Weekend Update (Season 34, Episode 17; aired March 7, 2009).

In The Simpsons episode "Girls Just Wanna Have Sums", a painting of Cathy is shown as part of a hall of famous female artists; in the painting, Cathy is shown in a one-piece swimsuit, saying "I finally fit into my summer bathing suit...and it's October!". In a Simpsons comic strip, Comic Book Guy owns a rare Cathy strip - the only one that men find funny.

In the 2022 Robot Chicken episode "May Cause Involuntary Political Discharge", Cathy falls in love with the Martian leader from Mars Attacks! over their shared love of the word "Ack!"

In the 2010 The Big Bang Theory episode "The Wheaton Recurrence", Sheldon brings Penny ice cream, citing that he had been familiarizing himself with the comic strip Cathy and that when she is upset, she says "Ack!" and eats ice cream.

In 2021, writer and comedian Jamie Loftus released Aack Cast, a podcast series examining the history, impact, and continuing relevance of the comic strip.

== See also ==
- Cathy Guisewite
- List of women in comics
- Reuben Award
