= Disney Learning: Mickey Mouse =

- Cover of Mickey Mouse Preschool
- Genre: Educational video game
- Developer: Disney Interactive
- Publisher: Disney Interactive
- Parent series: Mickey Mouse video games

Mickey Mouse Toddler, Mickey Mouse Preschool, and Mickey Mouse Kindergarten are three sister educational video games by Disney Interactive. They are part of the Disney Learning series.

== Commercial performance ==
The three games entered the charts around late 2000, with Kindergarten achieving #1 in the week of September 17–23. In the month of February 2001, Preschool, Kindergarten, and Toddler were the 3rd, 4th, and 6th Top Selling Home Education Software, respectively, according to PC Data. In the month of April 2001, they were the 1st, 2nd, and 5th top-selling in this category. Preschool was the 8th Top Selling Home Education Software title of 6–12 May and the 9th of May 13–19, 2001.

== Critical reception ==
Cover of Mickey Mouse Toddler

Cover of Mickey Mouse Kindergarten

=== Toddler ===
Superkids deemed the program "adorable" and "irresistible", noting its appeal to parents. DiscoverySchool wrote that the "colors are vibrant and screens are warm and detailed". ReviewCorner said the game had less content than other toddler games, but that it was easier to use. 7 Wolf thought the game was "unpretentious", and praised its "pleasant music, beautiful and stylish image".

=== Preschool ===
Superkids said the game offered a "pleasant romp", while negatively comparing it to Kindergarten. Edutaining Kids described the graphics as "stunning", though questioned the game's replay value.

=== Kindergarten ===
SuperKids said the game was "enjoyable" and featured a cast of familiar characters.
