= Timmie Jean Lindsey =

First person to have silicone breast implants (1931–2025)

Timmie Jean Lindsey (October 12, 1931 – December 9, 2025) was an American housewife who was the first woman in the world to undergo plastic surgery for breast augmentation by means of silicone implants, in 1962.

At the time, she was 29 years old and the divorced mother of six children. Hoping to have a large tattoo removed from her chest, she visited a plastic surgeon at the Jefferson Davis Hospital in Houston. The surgeon, Frank Gerow, was one of a group working on the concept of breast implants, and was looking for patients to volunteer for the surgery. She told them she was more interested in having them work on her ears, and the surgeons agreed to do that procedure as well. The procedure went forward under the direction of Gerow and his colleague Thomas Cronin, and was deemed a success at the time. Lindsey kept fairly quiet about her breast enlargement for many years – one boyfriend never knew for example. It was only decades later that she told many of her friends and family about it.

Fifty years later, Lindsey still had her original implants and reported general satisfaction with the procedure, despite pains and other concerns over the years. She never joined the groups of women (including several of her own relatives) who filed lawsuits about health problems associated with the implants, although she reported having experienced many of those problems.

Lindsey died on December 9, 2025, at the age of 94.
