= Gregg Berger =

American voice actor

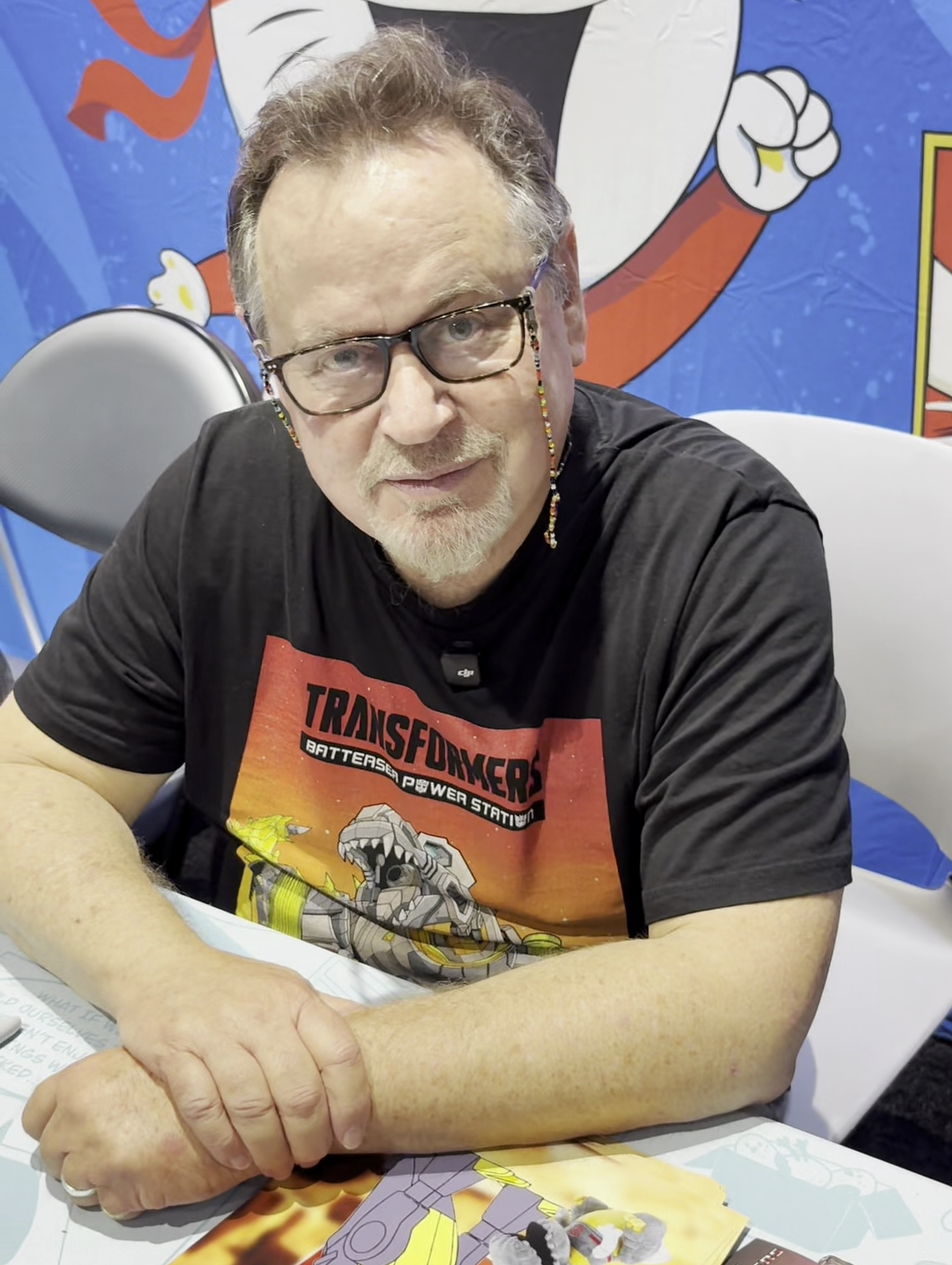
- Berger at the 2026 San Diego Comic-Con
- Born: Gregory Alan Berger; December 10, 1950 (age 75); St. Louis, Missouri, U.S.
- Other names: Greg Berger; Gregg A. Berger
- Occupation: Voice actor
- Years active: 1978–present
- Works: Full list
- Spouse: Dora J. Pearson (m. 1979)
- Children: 2

Gregory Alan Berger (born December 10, 1950) is an American voice actor. He is known for his roles as Jecht from Final Fantasy X (2001) and the Dissidia Final Fantasy games, Grimlock from The Transformers, Mysterio and Kraven the Hunter from Spider-Man: The Animated Series, Odie from most Garfield animated media, Cornfed Pig from Duckman, Bill Licking from The Angry Beavers, Agent Kay from Men in Black: The Series, The Gromble from Aaahh!!! Real Monsters, Captain Blue from Viewtiful Joe, Hunter the Cheetah (1999–2002) and Ripto from Spyro the Dragon, as well as The Thing, Galactus, and Attuma from Marvel: Ultimate Alliance.

== Early life ==
Berger was born on December 10, 1950, in St. Louis, Missouri to an observant Russian-Jewish family. He graduated from University City High School in 1968.

== Career ==
Berger began his career in 1978. He provided the voice of Adult Chirin in Ringing Bell. In 1982, he voiced Odie, one of the pets of Jon Arbuckle, in Here Comes Garfield. Berger would continue voicing Odie in various Garfield media such as Garfield and Friends (in which he also voiced Orson Pig in the U.S. Acres segments), The Garfield Show, and many more. He provided additional voices in Super Friends: The Legendary Super Powers Show, while he voiced Grimlock in The Transformers and its feature film, The Transformers: The Movie (1986).

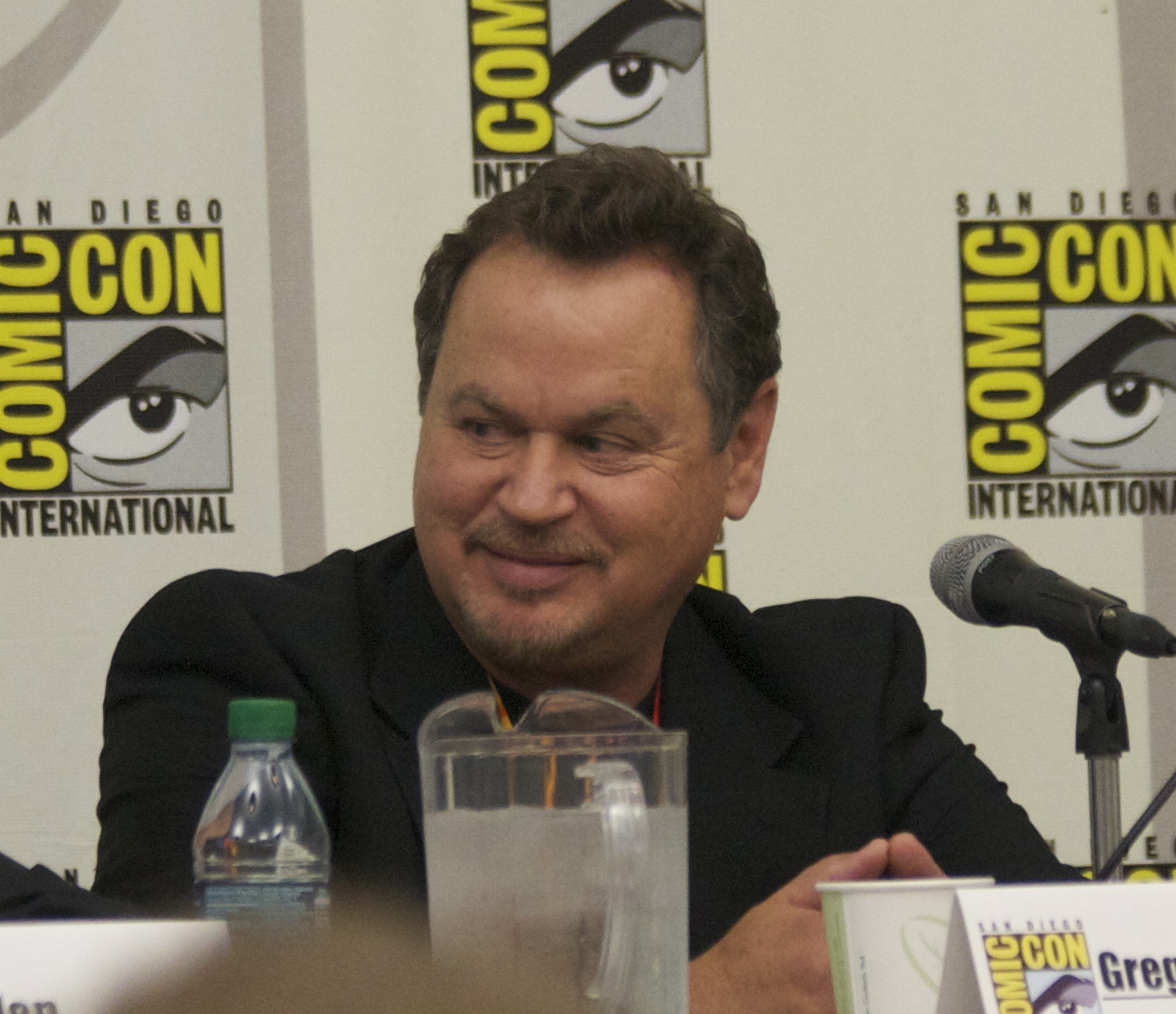
Berger at the 2012 Comic-Con International

Berger also voiced Cornfed in the animated sitcom series titled Duckman. In the Spyro video game series, he provided the voices of Ripto and Hunter the Cheetah from 1999 until 2002. He voiced Mysterio and Kraven the Hunter in Spider-Man: The Animated Series (or just called Spider-Man). Berger also provided additional voices for Inside Out (2015) and Illumination Entertainment's Despicable Me 3 (2017). He was also the voice of Jecht in the Dissidia Final Fantasy games and Final Fantasy X (2001).

== Awards and nominations ==
Year	Award	Category	Work	Result	Refs
1994	Annie Award	Best Achievement for Voice Acting	Duckman	Nominated	

Preceded by None	Voice of Grimlock; 1984–1987	Succeeded by David Kaye
Preceded by None	Voice of Skyfire; 1984–1985	Succeeded by Scott McNeil
