= Emily Levine =

American humorist, writer, and actress (1944–2019)

- Born: October 23, 1944 Nashville, Davidson County, Tennessee, USA
- Died: February 3, 2019 (aged 74); Berkeley, Alameda County, California
- Education: Harvard University
- Children: Abigail Sims

Comedy career
- Years active: 1971–2019
- Medium: Stand-up, television, film
- Genres: Political satire, improvisational comedy
- Subjects: The human condition, American politics, science
- Website: Emily's Universe

Emily Levine (October 20, 1944 – February 3, 2019) was an American humorist, writer, actress and public speaker who lectured on science and the human condition. Levine has been recognized as a philosopher comic. "In her celebrated career, Levine has been part of an improv comedy group, written for television sitcoms, done stand-up comedy, and wrote and performed an Emmy-winning series of commercial satire segments for television." She has earned the greatest praise for her one-woman shows, "Myself, Myself, I'll Do It Myself" and "Common Sense".

== Early life ==
Levine was born on October 20, 1944, in Nashville, and brought up in Connecticut and Brooklyn. Levine and her family moved quite frequently due to her father's career as a doctor. Levine eventually settled in Cambridge, Massachusetts, in order to attend Harvard University. While at Harvard, Levine began to act alongside fellow students such as John Lithgow. Levine graduated cum laude from Harvard University earning a degree in English and Social Relations. After graduating, Levine moved to Rome and found a job dubbing Spaghetti Westerns.

On returning to Brooklyn, Levine decided to put her personable skills to use and taught autistic children. Levine explained, "I was naturally good because of my performing abilities. At the same time, I didn't want to turn the classroom into my own personal stage." Levine channelled her acting potential into a late night improvisation group known as The New York City Stickball Team. The group consisted of individuals such as Robert Klein, Peter Boyle, and David Brenner. Levine was the only female within the group, a dynamic that caused relational problems between Levine and her partners. Levine explained: "We fought all the time, and you couldn't make a cent. But although I wanted to act, at the time I was cast only as cute and ditzy. I knew if I went that route, I'd become cute and ditzy in real life." The New York City Stickball Team disbanded soon after it began, however Levine found an innate pleasure in performing comedy, and decided to continue honing her comedic skills.

== Career ==
=== 1977–2007 ===
During the 1970s Levine began performing stand-up sets all around the United States. Levine's comedic style and persona has been defined as a "lean, lucid, 'lauder' of laughter". "She 'raps' about all aspects of human dynamics—like being somebody, money, or lack of it, power, violence, love ... Emily refers to her presentation as an 'obscene overture,' but actually her slightly censorable innuendoes are balanced perfectly by her soft-peddled, hard hitting facts of life." On February 9, 1977 Variety wrote a small critique on Levine's early stand-up performances. The review read: "At this point, Levine has the basis of some good material, but delivery seems to be of the lecture-platform type. Levine gives the impression of being intellectual and works in a manner that gets knowing glances and a few smiles." Levine continued to work on her stand-up routines, incorporating her intellect and humor in a more refined and professional manner.

The 1970s proved to be a difficult time period for several female comedians. "Once, in the mid 1970's at New York's Improvisation, Emily Levine found her time slot threatened when a stripper in the audience stood and began to perform impromptu, inspiring another woman, a rank amateur at stripping, to join her on stage." "Another comedienne and I were watching this," remarked Levine "and we're going nuts. Because these are our time spots going down the drain. Suddenly, we looked at each other ... and within seconds we were in the restroom. We took off our tops and went on the stage and told jokes." Levine, and countless other female comedians had several obstacles to overcome during their careers in comedy.

Levine began to write and produce a number of Emmy Award winning commercial satire segments for WNET's "Fifty-First State". WNBC's News Center 4 (based in New York City) admired her unique style of humor and realism—so much so, that they hired Levine as a weekly feature to provide consumer information.

In the 1980s, Levine became a television writer and producer, working on shows such as Designing Women, Love & War and Dangerous Minds. Levine was a radio commentator for WNYC in New York. She also has created several one-woman shows: It's Not You, It's the Universe: How to Have Your Cake and Eat It Too and Lose Weight and How I Learned to Stop Worrying and Love the Free Market. Her one-woman show "Chaos, Paradox, Ballroom Dancing" examines "society's shift from Newtonian physics and all its social, ethical, cultural, political and philosophical implications to quantum physics, with all its requisite implications".

Using her clever, intellectually relevant humor, Levine created and produced pilots for new situation comedies for CBS, NBC, ABC and HBO. Levine continued writing for television throughout the later half of the 1980s. Her talent as a writer and producer began attracting the eyes of several large companies including The Walt Disney Company. Levine worked at Disney for two years, however she had several issues with the company. She said:

The problem with Disney was that they treated the TV writer like a screenwriter who, in Hollywood, is a surrogate parent: The producer impregnates the writer with the seed of an idea, the writer brings it to term and then it's taken away. Eisner would give the same idea to five writers and they would compete to win his favor. Then, when I finally capitulated and signed with Disney, they said they were so excited they were sending me a present. I was thinking, maybe a Lalique vase; I could do with one of those. I looked out the window and saw the guy coming up the walk with a three-foot-high stuffed mouse. I looked it up in the catalogue and it was $60. And they called it 'life-size'.

Although Levine excelled in this profession, it was not until she was invited to join a "think tank" session at the University of Southern California that she found her true calling. Levine was able to publicly speak about subjects such as pornography and surrogate parenting. Levine explained: "People kept laughing when I said what I thought. But suddenly I realized it wasn't derision. It was the shock of recognition. That made such a difference—understanding that people took me seriously." Soon after, Levine was invited to another "think tank" in La Jolla. In order to prepare, Levine brushed up on physics and while doing so, stumbled onto quantum logic. Levine quickly came to the realization that she could continue comedy while lecturing audiences on intellectual material.

Levine appeared in the 1991 film Wisecracks, directed by Gail Singer. In 1992, Levine performed at a ceremony in which the Jessie Bernard Award recipients were awarded. In the mid-1990s, Levine began to experience a strange array of symptoms including mental fog, osteoarthritis, and a curious lack of interest in activities that she used to enjoy. These symptoms had a negative impact on Levine's career. In 2007, Levine was finally diagnosed with a tumor on her pituitary gland. After getting her tumor removed, Levine felt compelled to continue her career in comedy, but with a twist; Levine began lecturing on the human condition and its relation to science.

=== 2007–2019 ===
"After working in improv, stand-up, and sitcoms, she discovered quantum entanglement and chaos dynamics and somehow found a way to build comedy acts around science—and offer them, loaded with advice and social commentary, to corporate audiences." Once she realized that she was a natural at giving humorous lectures, Levine began to perform at conferences and large events. Levine spoke periodically at TED conferences, earning her immense recognition within the TED community. Levine spoke at an environmental awards conference in 2013 sponsored by Elbaz Family Foundation, Rolling Stone magazine, and One PacificCoast Bank, and others. In 2015, Levine spoke at a conference held by the University of California, Berkeley in which she spoke about the human condition.

Levine received praise for her unique lecturing style. Levine's love of science led her to begin creating a film called Emily @ the Edge of Chaos. In order to create the authentically scientific content of her show, Levine worked with "EST science advisor and physicist Gabriel Cwilich". The show description promised to "take you on an explosive, thought-provoking and hilarious ride through several paradigm shifts: from Newton's rational universe through quantum physics, chaos and complexity theory. You'll never feel the same way about phase transitions again and you'll finally understand how WIMPs can be action heroes." The film includes Lily Tomlin, Leonard Nimoy, John Lithgow, and several other famous individuals. Her daughter, Abigail Sims, continued to work on releasing the entire film after Levine died before she could finish it herself.

== Lung cancer ==
Her diagnosis with stage IV lung cancer emerged as a theme in her humorous writing including a blog for the Huffington Post and two blogs on her personal website entitled "The Yoy of Dying" and "Oracle Em". Levine continued to perform at conferences despite her various health concerns. In her 2018 TED talk, "How I Made Friends With Reality", Levine expressed her feelings towards her recent diagnosis of Stage IV lung cancer, and the inevitability of her own death. She said:

I love being in sync with the cyclical rhythms of the universe. That's what's so extraordinary about life: it's a cycle of generation, degeneration, regeneration. 'I' am just a collection of particles that is arranged into this pattern, then will decompose and be available, all of its constituent parts, to nature, to reorganize into another pattern.

== Death ==
Levine spent her final years in a rural home in California with her daughter, Abigail Sims. She died at her home in Inverness, California, on February 3, 2019. Levine was confined to her bed for less than a week, she didn't experience pain, she was able to communicate her wishes and continue being her hilarious, quick-witted, grateful self. Levine's daughter Abigail Sims continues to run Levine's website "Emily's Universe".

== See also ==
- Geri Jewell
- Lotus Weinstock
- Mitzi Shore
