= Shirley Mitchell =

American radio, film, and television actress (1919–2013)

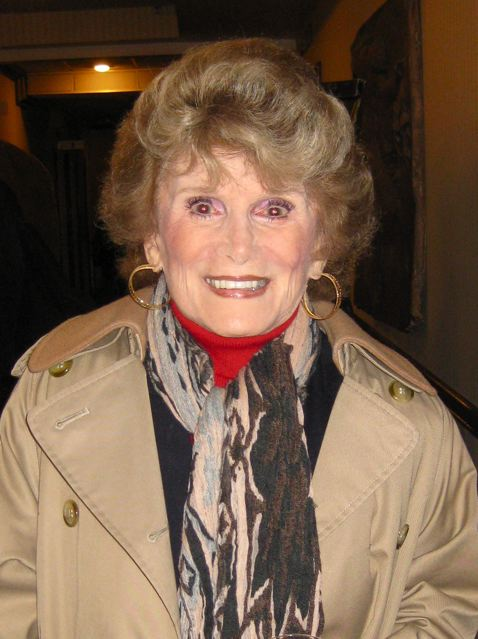
- Mitchell in October 2008
- Born: Shirley J. Mitchell; November 4, 1919; Toledo, Ohio, U.S.
- Died: November 11, 2013 (aged 94); Westwood, Los Angeles, California, U.S.
- Resting place: Westwood Village Memorial Park Cemetery, Los Angeles, California
- Education: University of Toledo; University of Michigan
- Occupations: Radio, film, and television actress
- Years active: 1941–2012
- Height: 5 ft 3 in (160 cm)
- Spouse(s): Julian Frieden (1946–1974; divorced; 2 children); Jay Livingston (1992–2001; his death)

Shirley J. Mitchell (November 4, 1919 – November 11, 2013) was an American radio, film, and television actress.

== Early life ==
Mitchell was born in Toledo, Ohio, the daughter of Sam Mitchell & Mary Ann Daniels, Jews who emigrated to America to escape the Russian Civil War. She also had a younger brother, Dr. Marvin Mitchell of Watertown, Massachusetts, with whom she was raised in Toledo, Ohio.

== Career ==
Following a move to Chicago, Mitchell appeared in the network radio broadcast of The First Nighter Program and played small parts in various soap operas, including The Story of Mary Marlin and The Road of Life. After she moved to Los Angeles, she played opposite Joan Davis and Jack Haley in The Sealtest Village Store. She also starred as Louella in The Life of Riley and joined the cast of Fibber McGee and Molly as Alice Darling in 1943. She also played in Amos & Andy and The Charlotte Greenwood Show.

Her most prominent radio role was that of the charismatic Southern belle Leila Ransom on The Great Gildersleeve beginning in September 1942. In the third season of I Love Lucy, from 1953 to 1954, she appeared in three episodes as Marion Strong, one of Lucy Ricardo's friends. She was the last surviving recurring adult cast member following the death of Doris Singleton in 2012.

In 1961 she appeared in an episode of The Tab Hunter Show.

In 1962, she played Janet Colton in 13 episodes of the sitcom Pete and Gladys, starring Harry Morgan and Cara Williams, with Peter Leeds cast as her husband George Colton. Between 1963 and 1965, she made five appearances on Perry Mason, including the 1965 episode "The Case of the Carefree Coronary," when she played Marilyn David, the widow of a murder victim. In 1964, she played the role of murder victim Elizabeth Bain, although her character was only heard, not seen, in "The Case of the Woeful Widower."

From 1965 to 1967, she appeared as neighbor Marge Thornton on Please Don't Eat the Daisies. She appeared in several TV shows of the 1960s (like Petticoat Junction as Cousin Mae in 1968) and did voice-over work in subsequent decades. Mitchell voiced Laurie Holliday on Hanna-Barbera's short-lived series The Roman Holidays in 1972. She also appeared in an episode of the crime drama The Feather and Father Gang in 1977.

In the late 1970s, Mitchell appeared with Don Porter in an episode of Three's Company.

== Personal life and death ==
She became engaged to Dr. Julian H. Frieden by early October 1946, holding her engagement shower at the home of singer Dinah Shore. They married on November 23, 1946.

By August 1955, they had two children, a girl (Brooke) and a boy (Scott). Mitchell and Frieden divorced in August 1974. In 1992, she married songwriter Jay Livingston, and the two remained married until his death in 2001.

Mitchell died of heart failure on November 11, 2013, aged 94.

== Partial filmography ==
- Jamboree (1944) as Alice Darling
- The Clown (1953) as Mrs. Blotto (uncredited)
- G.E. Summer Originals (1956), episode "It's Sunny Again"
- Spring Reunion (1957) as Jane the Receptionist (uncredited)
- Desk Set (1957) as Myra Smithers (uncredited)
- Too Much, Too Soon (1958) as Mrs. Magda Snow (uncredited)
- Because They're Young (1960) as Mrs. Summers (uncredited)
- My Blood Runs Cold (1965) as Mrs. Courtland
- Green Acres (1968) as Nurse
- The Roman Holidays (1972) as voice of Laurie Holiday
- Emergency! (1975) S5EP8 as Mrs. Larson
- Summer Camp Nightmare (1987) as Mrs. Knute
- Big Business (1988) as Stockholder
- The War of the Roses (1989) as Mrs. Dewitt
- MAD (2012) as Betty White (1 episode)
