= Cathy Guisewite =

American cartoonist (born 1950)

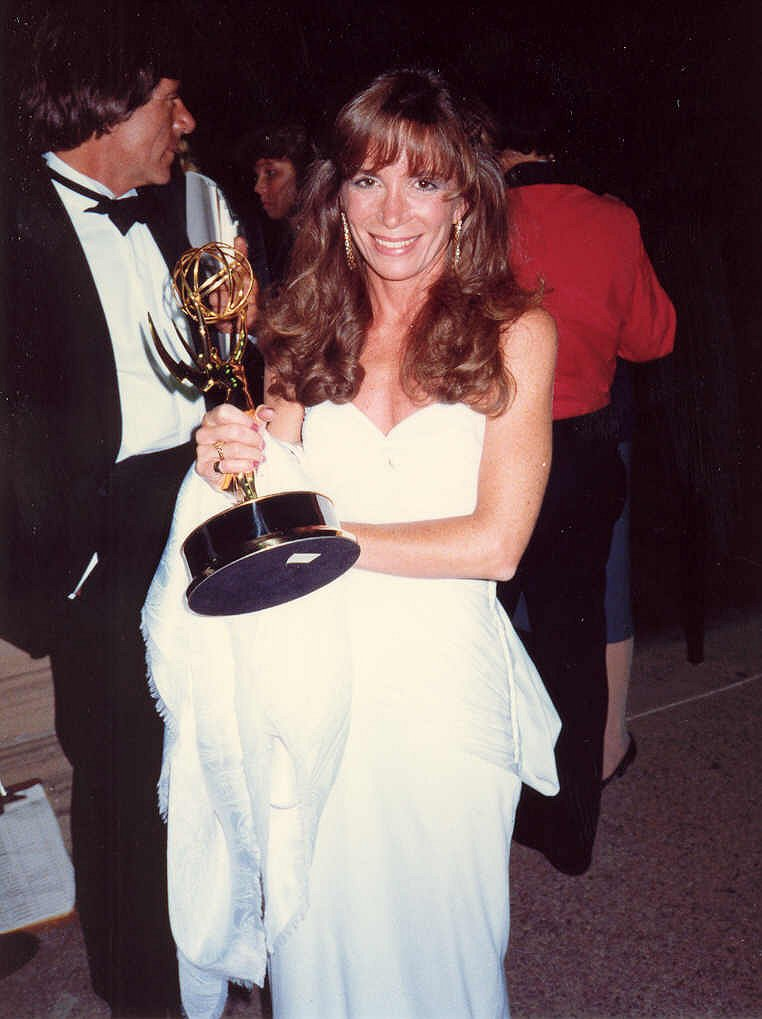
- Guisewite in 1987
- Born: Cathy Lee Guisewite; September 5, 1950 (age 76) Dayton, Ohio, U.S.
- Area: Cartoonist
- Notable works: Cathy (1976–2010)
- Awards: Emmy Award (1987); Reuben Award (1993)
- Spouse: Christopher Wilkinson (m. 1997; div. 2010)

Cathy Lee Guisewite (born September 5, 1950) is an American cartoonist who created the comic strip Cathy, which had a 34-year run. The strip focused on a career woman facing the issues and challenges of eating, work, relationships, and having a mother—or as the character put it in one strip, "the four basic guilt groups."

== Early life ==
Guisewite was born in Dayton, Ohio, to William L. and Anne Guisewite. She was raised in Midland, Michigan, with older sister Mary Anne Nagy and younger sister Mickey. Guisewite graduated from Midland High School in 1968.

She attended the University of Michigan in Ann Arbor, where she was a member of the Delta Delta Delta sorority. In 1972, she earned a bachelor's degree in English.

== Career ==
After college, Guisewite followed her father's vocation and began working in advertising at Campbell-Ewald, then Norman Prady, and settled at W.B. Doner & Co. near Detroit. She became a vice president of the firm in 1976.

She continued to draw funny pictures as an "emotional coping mechanism" to events in her life and work, and she would forward them to her parents. Her mother kept urging her to send them to a publisher, so she did. "My entire goal with my submission package was to get my mother off my back. My goal was not to do a comic strip. It was to make Mom quit telling me I could do a comic strip."

Guisewite was flabbergasted when the company sent her a contract to produce a comic strip. Cathy was syndicated to 66 newspapers in 1976 by Universal Press Syndicate, now Universal Uclick, and Guisewite did both—her advertising job during the day, and comics at night. By 1980, the strip was carried by 150 dailies, she was earning $50,000 per year for Cathy, she quit the advertising business to work on Cathy full-time, and she moved to Santa Barbara, California.

The comic strip was a "running social commentary" for her confusion. Guisewite explained, "You were a liberated woman or you were a traditionalist. To even voice vulnerability if you were a feminist was wrong and to voice interest in liberation if you were a more traditional woman was wrong. So I believe the women I was speaking to in the early years of my strip were women like me, who were at that age in our 20s where we were kind of launched into adulthood with a foot in both worlds and no way to really express it.”

Guisewite appeared several times as a guest on the late night TV series The Tonight Show Starring Johnny Carson.

At the peak of the strip's popularity in the mid-1990s, it appeared in almost 1,400 papers. However, on August 11, 2010, Guisewite announced the strip's retirement after 34 years. Its run ended on October 3, 2010 (a Sunday strip).

== Awards ==
In 1987, she received an Emmy Award for Outstanding Animated Program for the TV special Cathy.

Guisewite is a member of the National Cartoonists Society and in 1993 received its highest honor, the Reuben Award for Outstanding Cartoonist of the Year, for her work in 1992.

Guisewite has been granted honorary degrees from Russell Sage College, Rhode Island College, and Eastern Michigan University.

== Personal life ==
Guisewite adopted daughter Ivy in 1992, then married screenwriter Christopher Wilkinson in 1997. Wilkinson has a son, Cooper, but the couple had no children together. Guisewite and Wilkinson divorced in 2010.

== Publications ==
- The Cathy Chronicles, ISBN 0836211162, (1978)
- What Do You Mean, I Still Don't Have Equal Rights??!!, ISBN 0836211588, (1980)
- I Think I'm Having a Relationship With a Blueberry Pie!, ISBN 0553013378, (1981)
- What's a Nice Single Girl Doing with a Double Bed??!, ISBN 0553013165, (1981)
- Another Saturday Night of Wild and Reckless Abandon, ISBN 0836212010, (1982)
- It Must Be Love, My Face Is Breaking Out, ISBN 0836211839, (1982)
- Cathy's Valentine's Day Survival Book, How to Live through Another February 14, ISBN 0836212045, (1982)
- How to Get Rich, Fall in Love, Lose Weight, and Solve all Your Problems by Saying "NO", ISBN 0836219864, (1983)
- Eat Your Way to a Better Relationship, ISBN 0836219872, (1983)
- Climb Every Mountain, Bounce Every Check, ISBN 0836212177, (1983)
- A Mouthful of Breath Mints and No One to Kiss, ISBN 0836211200, (1983)
- Men Should Come With Instruction Booklets, ISBN 0836220552, (1984)
- Sorry I'm Late. My Hair Won't Start, ISBN 0449209253, (1985)
- Wake Me Up When I'm a Size 5, ISBN 0836220692, (1985)
- My Cologne Backfired, ISBN 0449209288, (1986)
- Stressed for Success, ISBN 0449210170, (1986)
- The Salesclerk made me Buy it, ISBN 0449209261, (1986)
- Thin Thighs in Thirty Years, ISBN 0836220811, (1986)
- A Hand To Hold, An Opinion To Reject, ISBN 0836220927, (1987)
- I'll Pay $5,000 For a Swimsuit That Fits Me!!!, ISBN 0449212483, (1987)
- It must be something in the ink. ISBN 0449214311, (1987)
- Two Pies. One Fork, ISBN 0449212491, (1987)
- May I borrow Your Husband and Baby?, ISBN 0449216349, (1988)
- Why Do the Right Words Always Come Out of the Wrong Mouth?, ISBN 0836218086, (1988)
- My Granddaughter Has Fleas!!, ISBN 0836218558, (1989)
- Sue the Hairstylist, ISBN 044921771X, (1989)
- $14 in the Bank and a $200 Face in My Purse, ISBN 0836218205, (1990)
- It isn't smog. It's eyeshadow!, ISBN 0449217728, (1990)
- The Family thigh problem begins with the mouth, ISBN 044921916X, (1990)
- Reflections, A Fifteenth Anniversary Collection, ISBN 0836218779, (1991)
- Run for Your Life...The Man Is a Cow, ISBN 0449220362, (1991)
- The Worse Things Get, the Better We Eat, ISBN 0449219178, (1991)
- Between love and madness lies the shoe department, ISBN 0449220370, (1992)
- Only Love Can Break a Heart, But a Shoe Sale Can Come Close, ISBN 0836218930, (1992)
- Dancing Through Life in a Pair of Broken Heels, ISBN 0553091905, (1993)
- I Want to Be the Person I Used to Be Repulsed By, ISBN 0449222446, (1993)
- Like Mother, Like Daughter, ISBN 0836230493, (1993)
- Revelations from a 45-Pound Purse, ISBN 0836217225, (1993)
- The Child Within Has Been Awakened But The Old Lady on the Outside Just Collapsed, ISBN 0836217616, (1994)
- Understanding the "Why" Chromosome, ISBN 0836204239, (1995)
- Cathy Twentieth Anniversary Collection, ISBN 0836225236, (1996)
- Shop Till You Drop Then Sit Down And Buy Shoes, ISBN 0836210689, (1996)
- Great Performances in the Kitchen: Recipes and Foodstyles of the Stars (with Johna Blinn), ISBN 0836221273, (1997)
- Abs of Steel, Buns of Cinnamon, ISBN 0836236831, (1997)
- Girl Food, ISBN 0836231732, (1997)
- I Am Woman, Hear Me Snore, ISBN 0836268210, (1998)
- Confessions to My Mother, ISBN 0836287886, (1999)
- I'd Scream Except I Look So Fabulous, ISBN 0740700065, (1999)
- Shoes: Chocolate For The Feet, ISBN 0740705555, (2000)
- Food: A Celebration of One of the Four Basic Guilt Groups, ISBN 0740721127, (2001)
- Love: A Celebration of One of the Four Basic Guilt Groups, ISBN 0740720619, (2001)
- Mom: A Celebration of One of the Four Basic Guilt Groups, ISBN 0740720600, (2001)
- Work: A Celebration of One of the Four Basic Guilt Groups, ISBN 0740720627, (2001)
- Cathy Collection: 25th Anniversary Book, ISBN 0740718436, (2001)
- The Wedding of Cathy and Irving, ISBN 0740726684, (2005)
- The Mother-Daughter Dance, ISBN 144947554X, (2016)
- Fifty Things that Aren't My Fault: Essays From the Grown-Up Years, (2019)
- Scenes From Isolation (2021)
