= Garfield: Lasagna World Tour =

2007 video game

- Developers: Blast Entertainment; Eko Software
- Publisher: Conspiracy Entertainment
- Series: Garfield
- Platforms: PlayStation 2; Microsoft Windows
- Release: 30 November 2007
- Genre: Action-adventure

Garfield: Lasagna World Tour is a third-person action-adventure platformer game for PlayStation 2 and Microsoft Windows based on the Garfield comics. It was developed by Eko Software and Blast Entertainment, and was published by Conspiracy Entertainment. It was released on 30 November 2007.

== Gameplay ==
Garfield: Lasagna World Tour is a platformer, in which Garfield puts on a variety of outfits to gain new abilities. Players can use Odie in platforming and, at certain points, rides on the dog's back in chases.

== Plot ==
Garfield learns about a treasure hunt, "The Lasagna World Tour", in which the winner gets a lifetime supply of lasagna. Unbeknownst to Garfield, an unnamed gray cat and his dog Brutus are set on stopping Garfield and Odie, and they are battled multiple times throughout the story.

== Reception ==
Reception

Aggregate score
Aggregator	Score
GameRankings	36.00%

Review scores
Publication	Score
IGN	2.5/10
PSXextreme	4.7/10

Reviewing the game for IGN, Sam Bishop was highly negative, giving the game a score of 2.5/10. He found that despite its "initial charm", the experience was "driven well into the ground before the game is close to over", adding "Lasagna World Tour is a pretty bad game". He was also highly critical of the sound and visuals, which he called some of the worst he'd heard in years. Ben Dutka, for PSXextreme, thought that the game was "prone to many drawbacks and errors, and [it was] just not all that entertaining".

A review in Random.Access thought that for "what it was meant to be" it was not horrible, and that it would appeal to its target market.
