= Gnorm Gnat =

197–1975 American comic strip by Jim Davis

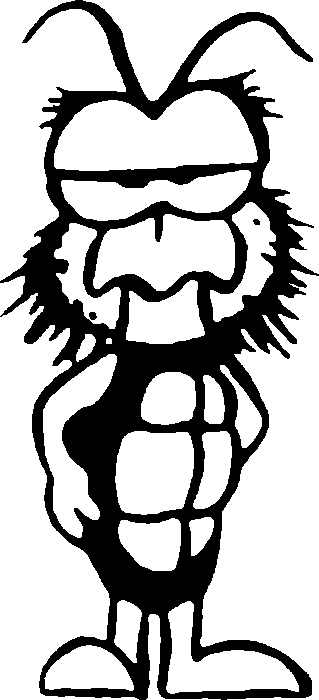
- Gnorm Gnat, the eponymous character
- Author: Jim Davis
- Current status/schedule: Ended
- Launch date: March 1, 1973; 53 years ago
- End date: December 25, 1975; 50 years ago
- Syndicate: None
- Genre: Humor
- Followed by: Jon

Gnorm Gnat is an American gag-a-day comic strip by Jim Davis centered on a community of anthropomorphic insects, with the title character being the protagonist. The strip appeared weekly in The Pendleton Times in Pendleton, Indiana, the only newspaper to publish the strip, from 1973 to 1975, but failure to take the character to mainstream success led Davis to instead create the comic strip Garfield. Mike Peters, creator of Mother Goose and Grimm, has said that Gnorm Gnat is now a part of "cartoon folklore" as a failure that paved the way for major success.

== History ==
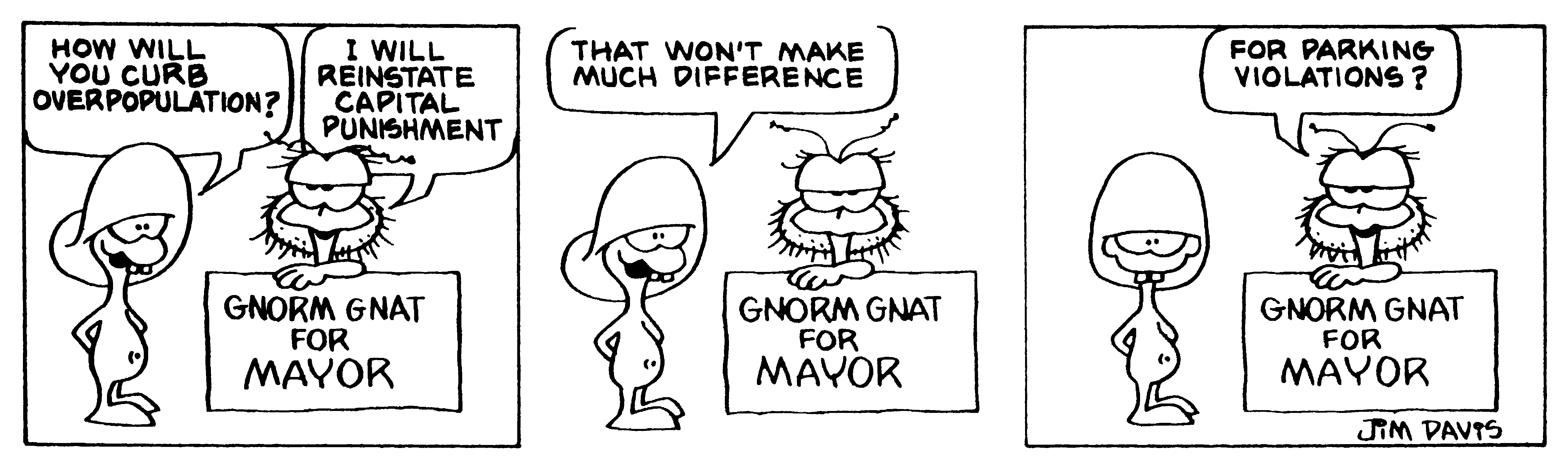
Gnorm Gnat strip for October 16, 1975

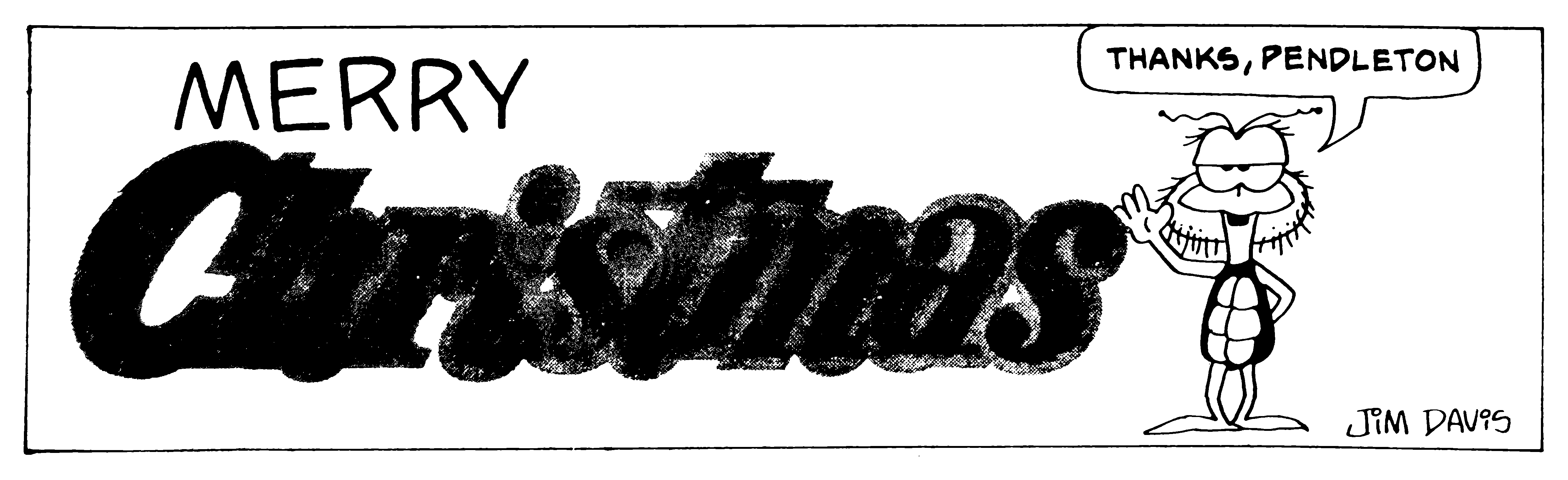
The final comic, which contradicts Davis' later statements.

Davis developed the idea for the strip while assisting cartoonist Tom Ryan on his Tumbleweeds strip. Davis saw the possibilities for gags with insect characters, and the strip was adopted by The Pendleton Times starting in early 1973. During this time, Davis unsuccessfully pitched Gnorm Gnat to various syndicates. According to writers Mark Acey and Scott Nickel, Davis would receive rejections for Gnorm Gnat for years. "I thought bugs were funny, and nobody else did", Davis later said.

Davis also recounted that one editor had advised him, "Your art is good, your gags are great, but bugs—nobody can relate to bugs!" Davis took the advice to heart and then turned to Garfield. Some in the media have also reported that Davis had become "bored with the strip." Another reporter suggested that the notion that no one can relate to insects has been disproved by some jokes in the comic strip The Far Side by Gary Larson.

For years since the strip ended, Davis claimed that the last published Gnorm Gnat strip involved Gnorm being stepped on by a human foot. This was later debunked after a Google Drive document containing many editions of The Pendleton Times that included Gnorm Gnat comics was uploaded in 2019 by YouTuber Quinton Kyle Hoover, a noted Garfield fan. The document contained the actual final strip (published on Christmas Day 1975), which depicted Gnorm standing beside a "Merry Christmas" message, saying, "Thanks, Pendleton." The document also contained some strips for Davis' next work, Jon, a prototype to Garfield, which debuted in the Times on January 8, 1976, two weeks after Gnorm Gnat ended. The comic strip Jon was renamed Garfield on August 1, 1977.

The Gnorm Gnat comics were published without copyright notices, making them and the characters public domain under pre-1978 U.S. copyright law.

=== Legacy ===
Garfield would later become accepted for national distribution by United Feature Syndicate in 1978 (the strip ended its run in the Times on March 2, and made its national debut on June 19 that year) and became a worldwide success. In 1992, one Garfield book called Garfield Takes His Licks referred to Gnorm as an in-joke. Gnorm Gnat was listed as #2 among the "Top Ten Comic Strips Jim Davis Tried Before Garfield", being placed behind "Garfield the Toaster" and above "Milt the Incontinent Hamster". In 1997, one Garfield comic strip featured a fly talking to a spider; Davis alluded to Gnorm Gnat by commenting that, "After nearly 30 years, I finally got a bug strip published".

However, Davis's fellow-cartoonist Mike Peters looked back on Gnorm Gnat in an unfavorable way. Peters claimed, "We can always be thankful that Jim's first strip never made it... Gnorm Gnat has gone down in cartoon folklore as a most fortunate failure. Can you imagine a bright orange gnat on every car window? A great, huge gnat for the Thanksgiving Day Parade. A big fat gnat saying 'I hate Tuesdays.'"

== Characters ==
From left to right: Lyman, Dr. Gougo, Freddy, Natasha, Dr. Rosenwurm, Cecil, Wench, & Drac
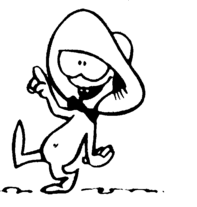

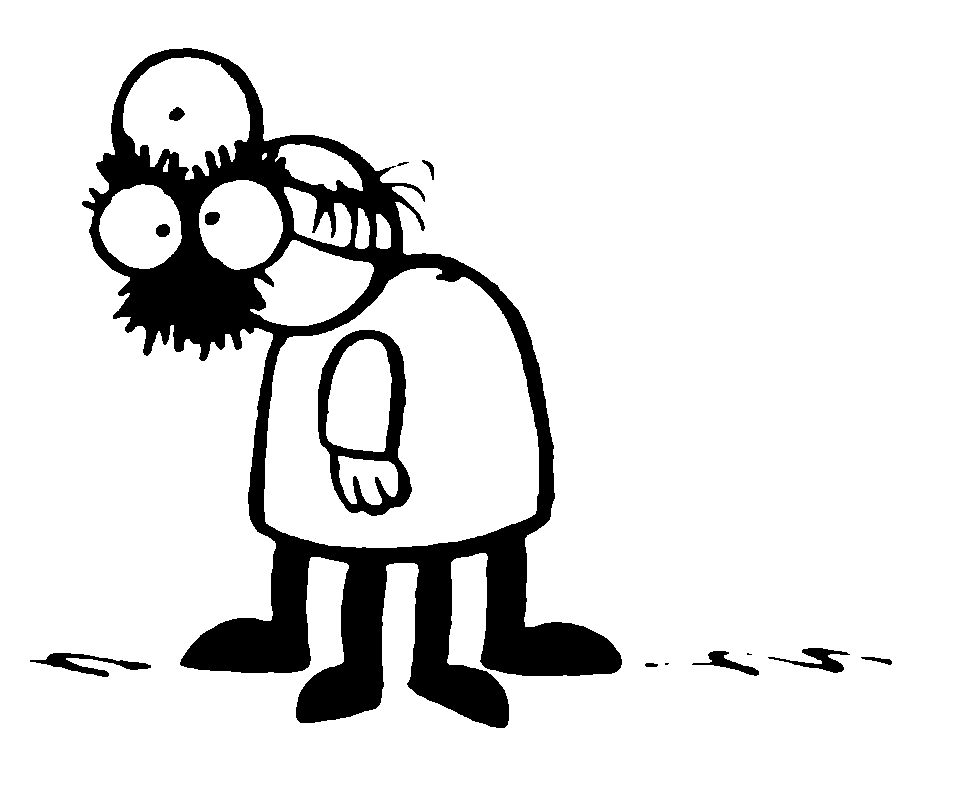

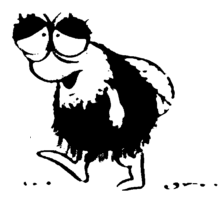

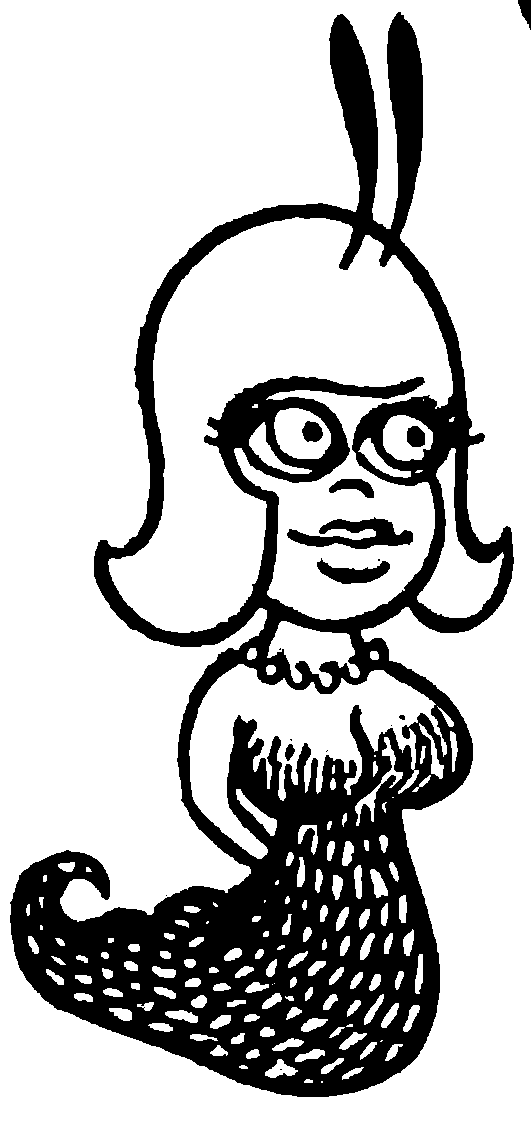

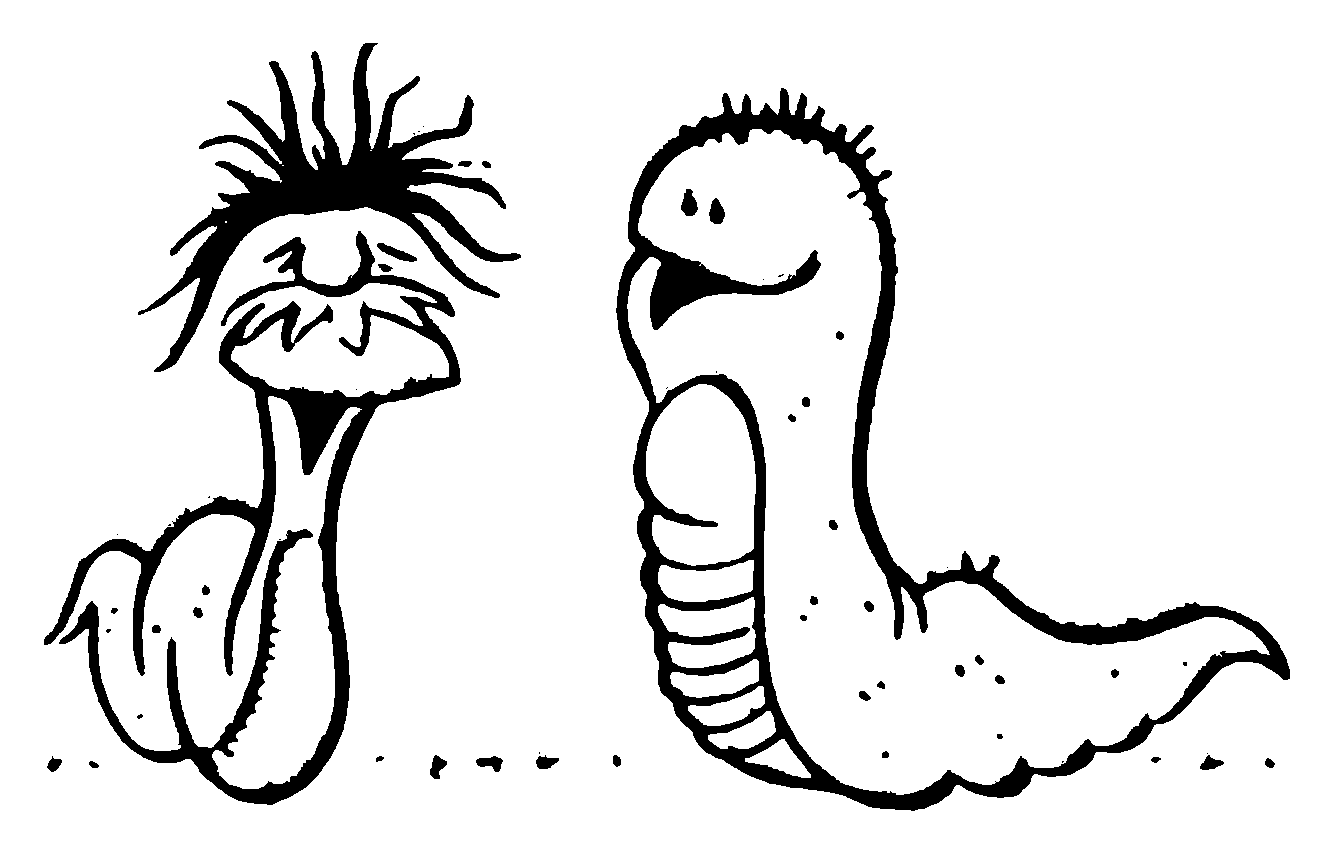

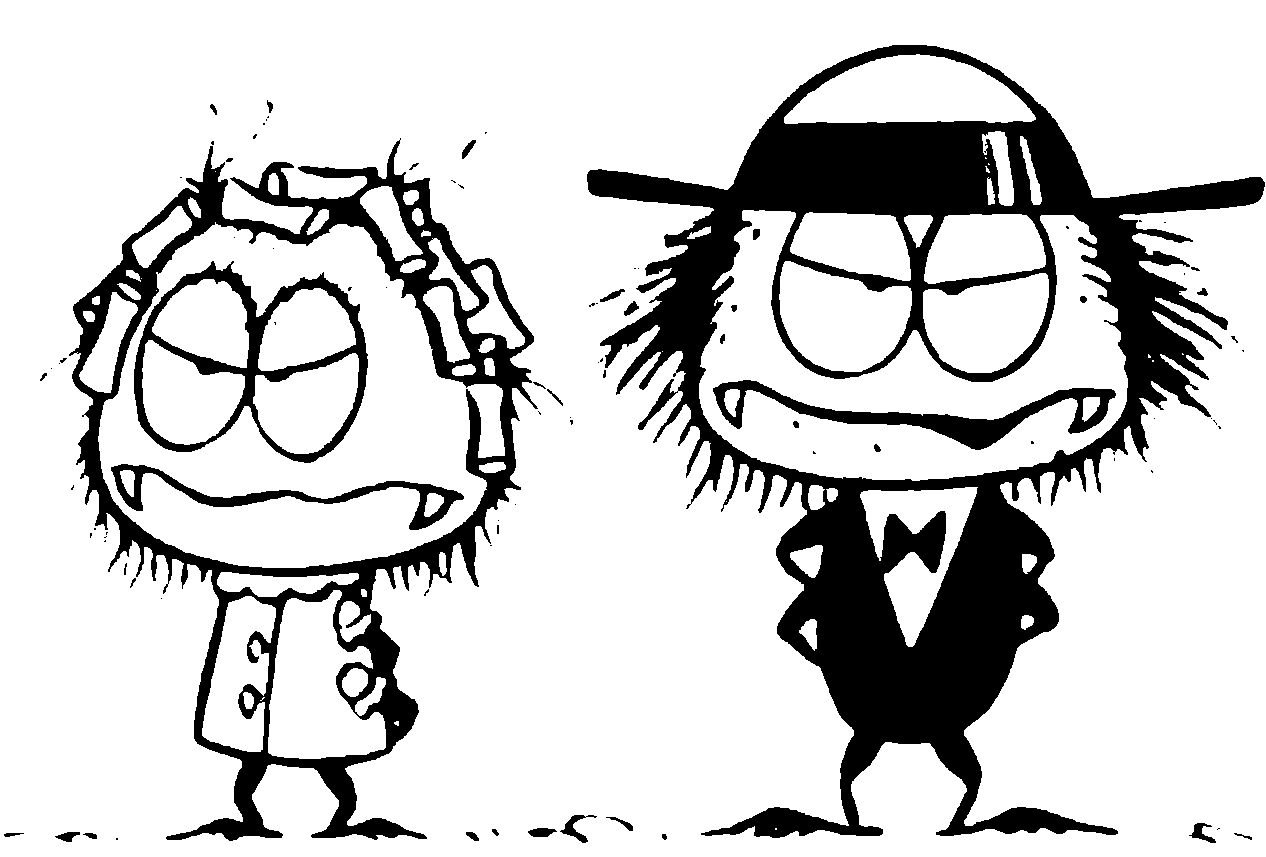

The characters of Gnorm Gnat were meant to be presented in a "simple, humorous style" of appearance. Davis displays the characters and describes them in the book 20 Years & Still Kicking!: Garfield's Twentieth Anniversary Collection.

- Gnorm Gnat is a gnat who Davis says plays the "straight man" and who sometimes behaves like the character Walter Mitty, a trait later shared by Orson Pig from U.S. Acres/Orson's Farm.
- Lyman is an insect with buck teeth who wears a hat. Described as "insane", he frequently irritates his "best friend" Gnorm with his punning quips and roundabout methods of cheating at tennis and checkers. Davis later named a character after him in Garfield.
- Dr. Gougo is an unspecified insect who acts as an incompetent medical practitioner. He speaks in a broken German accent.
- Freddy is a bedraggled fruit fly who has one week to live, however, despite this, he does not die in the strip.
- Natasha is a beautiful insect whom Gnorm has a crush on, this was later referenced by Dr. Liz Wilson & Jon in Jon.
- Dr. Morton Rosenwurm is an erudite worm. He has a fondness for reciting poetry, particularly the works of fictional Poet Laureate "John Arbuckle".
- Cecil Slug is a naïve, dimwitted slug.
- Drac Webb is a villainous spider (introduced as the strip's "token nasty") who eats other characters, typically by trapping them in webs.
- Wench Webb is Drac Webb's wife and a "source of many Bickerson-type discussions". She is one of only two female characters in the strip.
