= Tumbleweeds (comic strip) =

American comic strip (1965–2007)

- Author: Tom K. Ryan
- Current status/schedule: Concluded; daily and Sunday strip
- Launch date: September 6, 1965
- End date: December 30, 2007
- Syndicate(s): Lew Little Enterprises (1965–67); Register & Tribune Syndicate (1967–72); King Features Syndicate (1972–77); United Feature Syndicate (1977–80); Field Enterprises (1980–84); News America Syndicate (1984–86); North America Syndicate (1986–2007)
- Genre: Humor

Tumbleweeds was an American comic strip that offered a skewed perspective on life on the American frontier. Writer-artist Tom K. Ryan (June 6, 1926 – March 12, 2019) (who signed the strip "T.K. Ryan") was very familiar with conventions of the Western genre he satirized. Launched September 6, 1965, the strip was distributed for decades initially by the Register and Tribune Syndicate and later by the King Features Syndicate after its acquisition. After a 42-year run, Ryan retired and, rather than let it become a "zombie strip", brought Tumbleweeds to a conclusion on December 30, 2007.

Jim Davis, who created Garfield, was Ryan's assistant (from 1969 to 1978) while developing another strip, Gnorm Gnat.

== Characters and story ==
Tumbleweeds is set in and around the town of Grimy Gulch, whose population was stated as 49 (later it was crossed out and increased to 50, and sometimes was revised down when the villain Snake-Eye leaves town), in an unspecified Western territory. Other locations include the nearby village of the Poohawk tribe of Native Americans, and the United States Army outpost Fort Ridiculous, manned by the 6 7/8 Cavalry.

=== Grimy Gulch ===
- Tumbleweeds, the main character, is a laconic cowpoke who would rather be anywhere else, but has no real ambition to do anything. Like his namesake, he is content to tumble wherever human foibles may carry him. His worst nightmare is to be caught by – and married to – Hildegard Hamhocker.
- Blossom, Tumbleweeds' first horse; usually found asleep.
- Epic, Tumbleweeds' toothless, alcoholic, plug-chewing, sway-backed second horse; once a U.S. Cavalry horse, but drummed out of the service.
- Ace DeSilk, a professional gambler, Tumbleweeds' best pal and a very smooth operator.
- Judge Horatio Curmudgeon Frump is the magistrate/mayor of Grimy Gulch, a pompous windbag who became Justice of the Peace and boasts that he cannot be bought, but is open to "rental fees"!
- The Sheriff, a man with a ridiculous handlebar moustache, is the short-handed "long arm of the law".
- Deputy Knuckles, comic relief who does not carry a gun, but has a yo-yo instead.
- Quiet Burp is a diminutive lawman from Texas. His name, a play on Wyatt Earp, is a character name also used in the comic strip Rick O'Shay.
- Hildegard Hamhocker, the town's only known woman, is drawn as a stereotypical homely old maid, trying to snag Tumbleweeds as a husband.
- Echo is an orphan girl. Cute and precocious, she knows how to use those qualities when necessary. She is Hildegard's adopted niece.
- Pajamas is Echo's lazy pet dog — so lazy that when it dreams, it dreams of sleeping.
- Claude Clay is Grimy Gulch's undertaker, whose motto is, "You plug 'em ... I plant 'em."
- Wart Wimble is a gravedigger who works for Clay.
- Blackie is Grimy Gulch's saloon keeper.
- Soppy Sopwell is the town drunk.
- Grover Galley is the dotty editor of the Desert Denouncer newspaper.
- Percy is a sardonic newsboy and copyboy for the Denouncer.
- Dusty Dewlap is a local cattle rancher. He only hires Tumbleweeds when he is desperate.
- Snake-Eye McFoul is an outlaw. He visits Grimy Gulch from time to time to rob the bank.
- Snookie is Snake-Eye's little brother, who suffers from an overactive pituitary gland. Though only 12, he appears to be in his thirties. He dresses in "Little Lord Fauntleroy" outfits. Attends the John Wesley Hardin Memorial Elementary School.
- Ham and Beans are muleskinners. Beans, who is short and loud-mouthed, screams at the big, gentle Ham for pampering the mules to the point of carrying them around like infants.
- Slats is a cowboy who is always leaning on the fence.
- Hogarth Hemp is an itinerant hangman who visits the town periodically.
- Clodwell Gunkley who apparently wandered into the wrong strip, according to whoever he encounters, is a semi-effeminate bulk of a man whose speech patterns are somewhat similar to those of Ed Wynn. Ace was pleased to learn that Gunkley had wandered into the strip, because "If there's a way in, there's a way out!"

=== The 6 7/8 Cavalry ===
- Colonel G. Armageddon Fluster, commander of the 6 7/8 Cavalry and Fort Ridiculous, is a parody of George Armstrong Custer. The Poohawk Chief refers to him as "Goldilocks" and "Poopsie."
- The 6 7/8 Cavalry consists of a major and troopers under Fluster's command.
- The General is Fluster's superior.
- Mole Eye, a scout from Fort Ridiculous, is usually shown coming in from the desert with a couple of arrows sticking out of his back. He wears buckskin and has the word "Scout" on his hat.

=== The Poohawks ===
- The Poohawk Chief is always lamenting his tribe's pathetic standing.
- Little Pigeon is the Poohawk Chief's daughter, and "a flower among the weeds".
- Limpid Lizard is a klutzy Poohawk (Indiandom's answer to Daffy Duck) and a suitor to Little Pigeon. His word balloons consist of misspelled words and homonyms.
- Puce Moose is the straight man of the Poohawks and one of the more competent braves – especially when compared to his frequent companion, Limpid Lizard.
- Green Gills is a Poohawk who was an early suitor to Little Pigeon.
- Lotsa Luck is a very rich Poohawk, depicted for years as mute and communicating by writing notes. He eventually started using a very posh voice when he had vocal cords cloned from William F. Buckley Jr. surgically implanted. He was a suitor for Little Pigeon.
- Drudgeworth is a chauffeur employed by "Lotsa Luck" to "drive" his horse.
- The Poohawk medicine man.
- Screaming Flea is the smallest Poohawk, formally speaking in ornate word balloons. He is very sensitive about the size of his nose, which is enormous.
- Bucolic Buffalo is the biggest and strongest of Poohawks, but he is not very smart. A running gag is that when anyone (such as "Lotsa Luck") makes him angry, he sends them "South" (into the ground.) He is another suitor for Little Pigeon.
- Rain Drop is a boy, the only apparent child in the Poohawk Tribe, and at least as smart as some of the adults.
- Hulking Hawk is a fearsome tribe-member and a more suitable suitor to Little Pigeon than Limpid Lizard, according to the Poohawk Chief.
- Purple Polecat operates the trading post.

== Appearances in other media ==
Tumbleweeds was to be one of the strips animated in Filmation's 1978 series Fabulous Funnies (along with Broom-Hilda, Nancy, Alley Oop and others) and was included in the series' premiere episode with Alan Oppenheimer doing the voice of the title character. However, after the first episode aired, it was learned that Filmation lacked the rights to use the property, and the segment was removed from future episodes.

Tumbleweeds made another animated appearance in The Fantastic Funnies, a 1980 television special that showcased numerous comic strips. One of the strips was animated, courtesy of Bill Melendez Productions.

Tumbleweeds Gulch became an MGM Grand Adventures Theme Park attraction, and the strip also was the basis for a Las Vegas stage show. In 1983, Tumbleweeds was adapted into a musical comedy for high school productions by the same company that adapted the strip Luann.

== Book collections ==
The following is a list of US book collections, all of them mass-market paperbacks from Fawcett Gold Medal Books except as noted, including book number (from the cover) and publication date. They are ordered by publication date rather than ISBN. A list in an outdated archived webpage from GeoCities, by Tom Ryan himself, is in yet another order.

- Tumbleweeds (231-01939-050, 1968)
- Let 'Er Rip, Tumbleweeds (231-02099, 1969)
- Tumbleweeds #3 (449-02238-050, 1970)
- Tumbleweeds #4 (449-02419-050, 1971)
- Tumbleweeds #5 (449-02564-050, 1972)
- Hang in There, Tumbleweeds (1-3571-3, 1976)
- Tumbleweeds Roundup! (0-440-13814-3, 1977)
- Good News for Grimy Gulch (Judson Press, 0817007369, 1977) (selected strips with theological commentary)
- Ride On, Tumbleweeds! (0-449-14040-7, 1978)
- Tumbleweeds & Company (0-449-14198-5, 1979)
- Head 'em Off, Tumbleweeds! (0-449-14328-7, Mar 1980)
- Sackside Tumbleweeds (0-449-14373-2, Nov 1980)
- Tumbleweeds Express (0-449-14407-0, May 1981)
- Saddle Up, Tumbleweeds! (0-449-14474-7, Jun 1982)
- Sound Off, Tumbleweeds! (0-449-12386-3, Feb 1983)
- Tumbleweeds Revisited (0-449-12608-0, Nov 1983)
- Tumbleweeds Country (0-449-12609-9, May 1984)
- Tumbleweeds Buckaroo (0-449-12819-9, Jul 1985)
- Tumbleweeds Wild West (0-449-12820-2, May 1986)
- Tumbleweeds Rodeo (0-449-13244-7, Jun 1987)
- Tumbleweeds Corral (0-449-13245-5, Nov 1987)
- Presenting the Best of Tumbleweeds: An, Uh, Unusual Saga of the Old West (Cool Hand Communications, 156790128X, Feb 1994)

Six Italian collections are 45 Colpi Di Colt, La Vita Dura Del Dolce Far West, Il Colt Piu' Scalcinato Del West, Manuale per Accappiare Un Marito, Voi Li Impiombate Io Li Sotterro (You plug 'em, I plant 'em), and Colt 192.

== Theme park ==
Tumbleweeds is featured in the Universal Studios Florida theme park Islands of Adventure, where Tumbleweeds, Ace DeSilk, Hildegard Hamhocker and Deputy Knuckles are seen on a cactus and Claude Clay is seen in front of a saloon which is part of Toon Extra in Toon Lagoon.

== Sources ==
- Strickler, Dave. Syndicated Comic Strips and Artists, 1924–1995: The Complete Index. Cambria, California: Comics Access, 1995. ISBN 0-9700077-0-1
