= The Garfield Movie =

2024 film by Mark Dindal

- Theatrical release poster
- Directed by: Mark Dindal
- Screenplay by: Paul A. Kaplan; Mark Torgove; David Reynolds
- Based on: Garfield by Jim Davis
- Produced by: John Cohen; Broderick Johnson; Andrew A. Kosove; Steven P. Wegner; Craig Sost; Namit Malhotra
- Starring: Chris Pratt; Samuel L. Jackson; Hannah Waddingham; Ving Rhames; Nicholas Hoult; Harvey Guillén; Cecily Strong; Brett Goldstein; Bowen Yang; Snoop Dogg
- Edited by: Mark Keefer
- Music by: John Debney
- Production companies: Columbia Pictures; Alcon Entertainment; Prime Focus Studios; Andrews McMeel Entertainment
- Distributed by: Sony Pictures Releasing (worldwide); Intercontinental Film Distributors; Mei Ah Entertainment (Hong Kong)
- Release dates: May 19, 2024 (Grauman's Chinese Theatre); May 24, 2024 (United States); June 22, 2024 (Hong Kong)
- Running time: 101 minutes
- Countries: United States; United Kingdom; Hong Kong
- Language: English
- Budget: $60 million
- Box office: $257.2 million

The Garfield Movie is a 2024 animated adventure comedy film based on the comic strip Garfield created by Jim Davis. Directed by Mark Dindal and written by Paul A. Kaplan, Mark Torgove, and David Reynolds, it is the third theatrical Garfield film adaptation and sixth overall, as well as the first since Garfield's Pet Force (2009). The film features the voices of Chris Pratt as Garfield and Samuel L. Jackson as his father, alongside Hannah Waddingham, Ving Rhames, Nicholas Hoult, Cecily Strong, Harvey Guillén, Brett Goldstein, Bowen Yang, and Snoop Dogg. In the film, Garfield is reunited with his long-lost father, a street cat named Vic, before being forced into joining him on a high-stakes adventure due to the intimidation of a ruthless cat that Vic knew.

Development on The Garfield Movie began at Alcon Entertainment in 2016. Dindal was announced as the film's director in November 2018, and pre-production began the following month. By 2021, Pratt had been cast as Garfield, with the rest of the cast joining the following year. The film was animated by DNEG Animation, while John Debney, a frequent collaborator of Dindal, composed the score.

The Garfield Movie premiered at Grauman's Chinese Theatre in Los Angeles on May 19, 2024, and was released in the United States on May 24, by Sony Pictures Releasing. The film received generally negative reviews from critics but was a commercial success, grossing $257 million against a $60 million budget. It was nominated at the 2024 Kids' Choice Awards for Favorite Animated Movie. A sequel is in development.

== Plot ==
Garfield is a fat, sedentary tabby cat who lives a pampered lifestyle with his beagle dog sidekick Odie and their owner Jon Arbuckle. One night while getting a midnight snack, Garfield and Odie are abducted by a Shar Pei named Roland and a Whippet named Nolan and taken to an abandoned mall. They are rescued by Garfield's estranged father Vic whom Garfield resents for abandoning him in an alley as a kitten. Jinx, a deranged white Persian cat with a grudge against Vic, arrives seeking revenge for being left behind during a milk heist at Lactose Farms. She then offers to forgive Vic if he, Garfield, and Odie steal a large quantity of milk as compensation for her imprisonment in the pound, while Roland and Nolan watch closely.

The following morning, Jon notices Garfield and Odie's disappearance and has trouble calling people to help search for them. While freighthopping a freight train to Lactose Farms, which is through a series of temperate broadleaf and mixed forests in the rural area, Vic attempts to bond with Garfield to no avail. The trio reach the farm, which is heavily guarded by an advanced security system. They meet Otto, a Highland bull and the farm's former mascot, who was cast out after a corporation took over, separating him from his Holstein Friesian girlfriend, Ethel. They agree to help get Ethel out of the farm if he helps them break in.

While preparing for the heist, Garfield and Vic frequently clash with each other, forcing Odie and Otto to tie them to an oak tree. During a heated argument, Vic forlornly reveals that he was actually obtaining food for Garfield, but the busboy got in the way, delaying his return. He returned with an anchovy only to find Jon taking care of him in an Italian restaurant that he wandered off into. Solemnly accepting Jon as a better care provider, Vic let him adopt Garfield and kept his distance from his son. Understanding the circumstances, Garfield forgives his father.

Meanwhile, Roland and Nolan report to Jinx, but she calls the farm's animal control officer Marge Malone to frame Garfield, Odie, and Vic for it.

Guided by Otto, the trio successfully infiltrates the farm, but Marge intercepts them at the loading dock and captures Garfield and Odie. Vic remorsefully leaves them behind despite his son's pleas, steals the milk truck, and successfully delivers it to Jinx only to be betrayed and captured by her. Meanwhile, Garfield and Odie end up at the pound where Garfield meets Vic's old crewmates, who kicked him out for prioritizing Garfield over their plans, and Vic has been keeping distance, watching him. Though Garfield does not believe their claims until Jon arrives to bail them out and retrieve them. After returning home, Garfield discovers Vic's tally marks on an oak tree, realizing that he loves him and left him and Odie to protect them from Jinx, knowing she lied about forgiving him.

Garfield, with renewed faith in his father, decides that he and Odie need to save him at the mall. There, they discover Jinx's plan to kill Vic by throwing him off a cable-stayed bridge into the canyon below filled with jagged rocks. Garfield, Odie, Otto, and an army of drones arrive to rescue Vic, but they fail and are left at Jinx's mercy. However, witnessing Vic and Garfield's love for each other, Roland and Nolan now have a change of heart, turn on Jinx, who in response pushes them off the train and into the canyon only to be knocked off herself. Otto uses a rope to catch everyone, landing them safely on a net set up by Odie, and apprehending Jinx. They then return to the farm via a milk truck, trading Jinx to Marge for Ethel's release and reuniting her with Otto. The reformed Roland and Nolan work as guard dogs for Marge, while Jinx serves community service as punishment for her crimes.

Upon returning home, Garfield finally reconciles with Vic, who moves in with the trio and officially becomes a part of his son's life. A party is thrown with the cows, Vic's old crew, Roland and Nolan, and the animal representatives.

== Voice cast ==
- Chris Pratt as Garfield, a fat, sarcastic and lazy orange tabby cat
- Samuel L. Jackson as Vic, Garfield's estranged biological father
- Hannah Waddingham as Jinx, a ruthless white Persian cat and one of Vic's former crewmembers
- Ving Rhames as Otto, a purple Highland bull with a broken horn and the former mascot of Lactose Farms
- Nicholas Hoult as Jon Arbuckle, Garfield and Odie's owner.
- Harvey Guillén as Odie, a yellow beagle and Garfield's best friend
- Cecily Strong as Marge Malone, the dedicated Animal Control officer of Lactose Farms
- Brett Goldstein as Roland, a large Shar Pei with deep flaps and one of Jinx's henchmen
- Bowen Yang as Nolan, a small whippet and one of Jinx's henchmen
- Snoop Dogg as Maurice, a blue Maine Coon with an eyepatch and another of Vic's former crewmembers
- Janelle James as Olivia, a green cat and another of Vic's former crewmembers
- Angus Cloud as Snickers, a small purple cat and another of Vic's former crewmembers. Cloud completed his voicework prior to his death on July 31, 2023, and the film was dedicated to his memory.
- Jeff Foxworthy as a bird who gets electrocuted on a Lactose Farms fence
- Eugenia Caruso as Maria, an Italian restaurant worker
- Dev Joshi as Liz, a veterinarian and Jon's love interest
- Mark Dindal as the voice on the Sleep App that Jon uses
- Cameron Bernard Jones as:
  - Barry, an eastern bluebird and one of Jinx's henchmen whom she eats for objecting with her
- A male Lactose Farms phone operator
- Alicia Grace Turrell as:
  - Ethel, a Holstein Friesian at Lactose Farms and Otto's love interest
  - A female Lactose Farms phone operator
- Eric Loren as:
  - Roadkill, a Virginia opossum
  - A busboy at the restaurant that Jon dined at.

Nermal appears during the party in the final scene of the movie, but has no dialogue.

== Production ==
=== Development ===
In May 2016, seven years after 20th Century Fox's license with Paws, Inc. expired, it was announced that Alcon Entertainment would develop an animated Garfield film, with John Cohen and Steven P. Wegner producing, from a script by Mark Torgove and Paul A. Kaplan. Warner Bros. was considered a likely distributor given their partnership with Alcon, and Alcon also intended to launch a franchise of CG-animated Garfield films. Mark Dindal was announced as director in November 2018, with pre-production beginning the following month. In November 2021, David Reynolds was announced to write the film, reuniting with Dindal after having previously worked together on Disney Animation's The Emperor's New Groove (2000). Sony Pictures would distribute the film under its Columbia Pictures label except for China, Hong Kong and Taiwan, and DNEG Animation would provide the animation. By September 2023, it was reported that the film would be entitled The Garfield Movie.

=== Casting ===
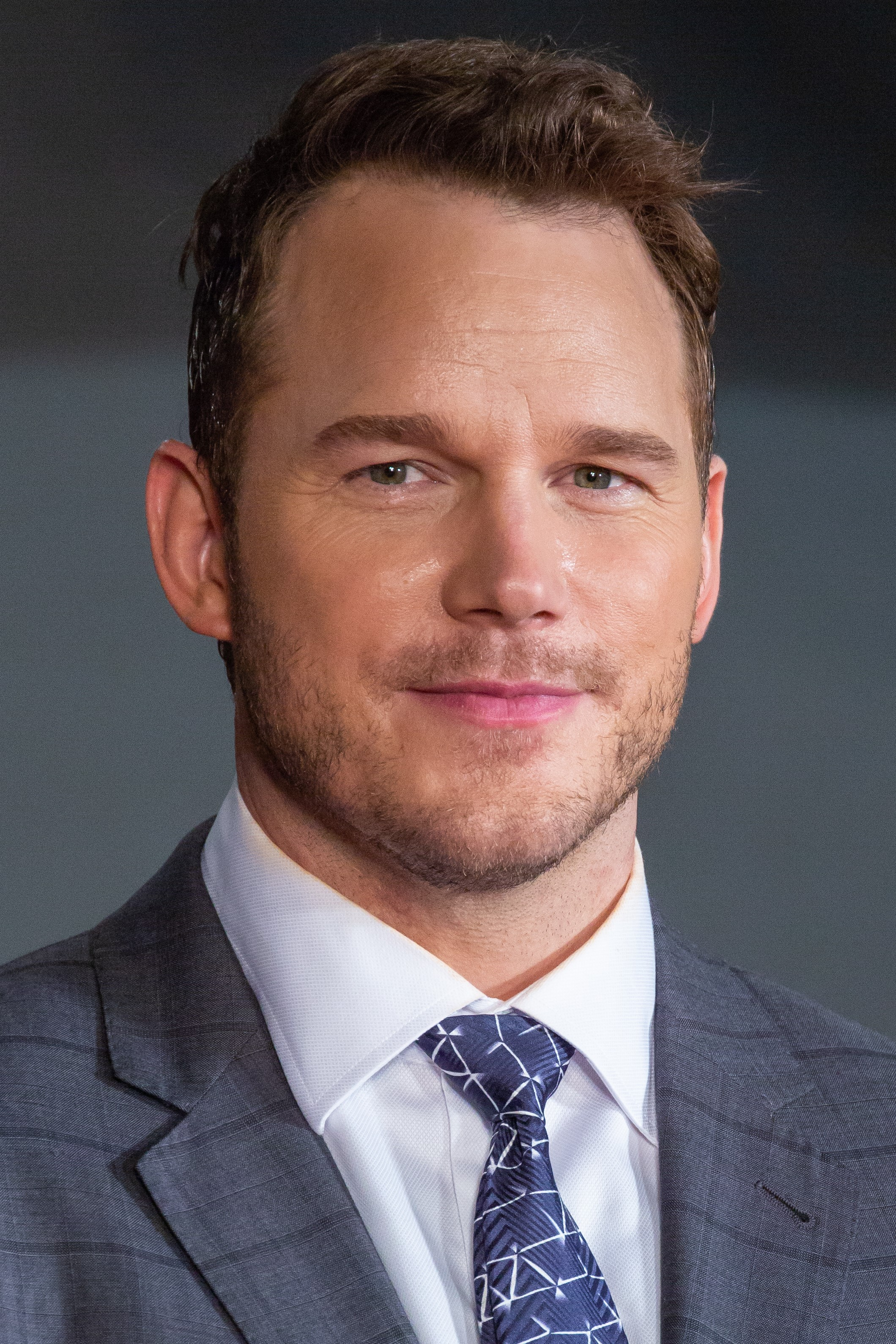
Chris Pratt provides the voice of Garfield in the film

In November 2021, Chris Pratt was announced to star as Garfield. In May 2022, it was reported that Samuel L. Jackson joined the film as Garfield's father, Vic. In August 2022, Ving Rhames, Nicholas Hoult, Hannah Waddingham and Cecily Strong were added to the cast. In November 2022, Brett Goldstein and Bowen Yang were added to the cast. Harvey Guillén was confirmed to voice Odie in November 2023, and Hoult was later confirmed to voice Jon Arbuckle in December 2023. With the release of the second trailer in March 2024, Snoop Dogg was revealed to star in the film, and Janelle James was also announced to star the same month.

Garfield creator Jim Davis has approved of Pratt's casting as Garfield, believing his performance embraced "all sides of the character" and not just Garfield's deadpan humor. Pratt was also director Mark Dindal's first choice to voice Garfield, believing "he had been 'imagining [Pratt's] voice coming out of Garfield' for years". Dindal believed that his natural voice captured Garfield's laziness and sarcasm, and to test the compatibility, the animators paired his voice with snippets of Garfield's dialogue.

=== Animation ===
Animation services for the film were provided by DNEG Animation. Visual effects supervisor Freddy Chaleur recalled Dindal expressing to DNEG that "the aim and goal of the film [was] to pay homage to Jim Davis and the comic strip," with Davis being involved early on in pre-production.

Animation supervisor Karun Reddy explained that the team aimed to "capture the 2D aesthetic of the comic" in a 3D space, and deemed "overcoming the technical difficulties associated with fur and exaggerated animation" to be the most challenging task. Character rigs were designed with "multiple arms, legs and eyes" to allow for more exaggerated poses; "classic Garfield shapes" from the strips were also used as reference points. Additionally, the team sought to translate the "painterly, handmade quality" of the production's concept art into the finished film, which was done in part by "incorporat[ing] brush strokes and handmade details to achieve a softer look."

=== Music ===
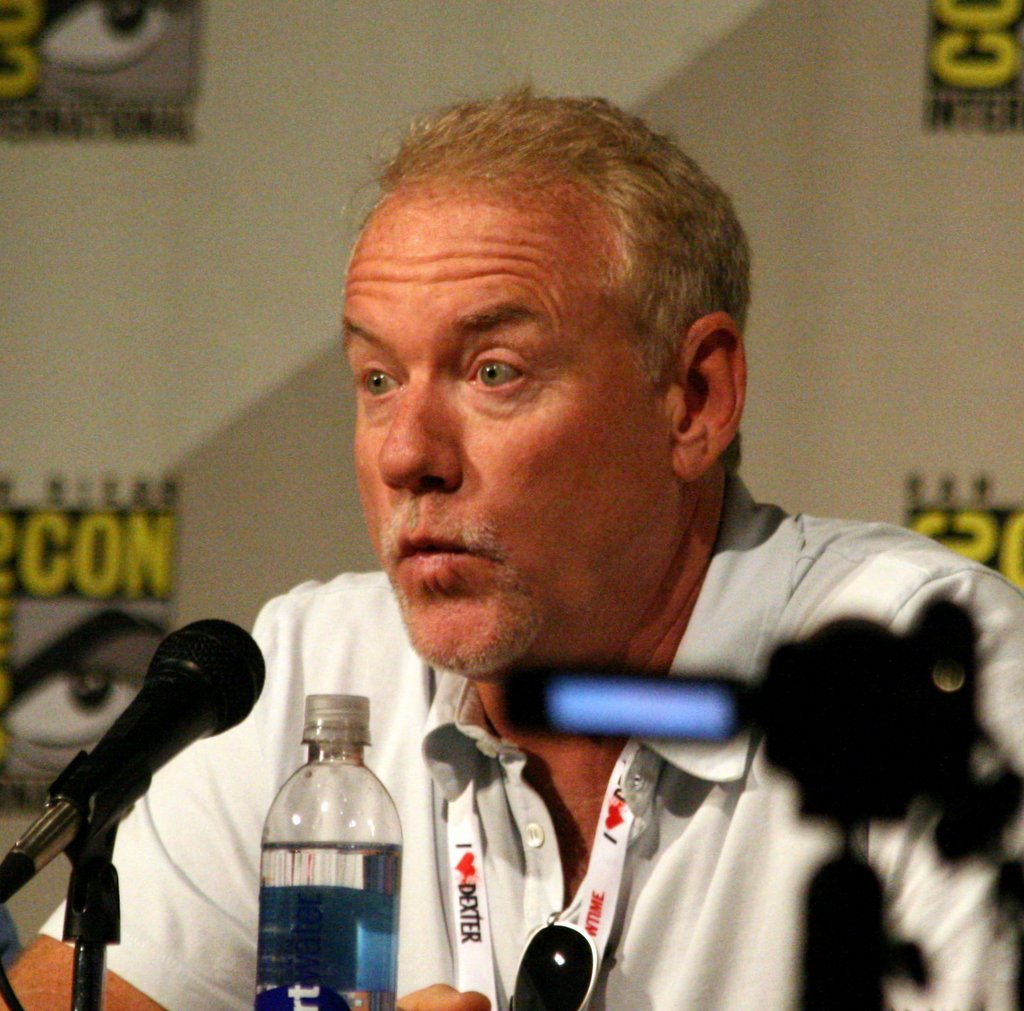
John Debney composed the film's score.

In November 2023, it was reported that John Debney would compose and conduct the film's score, marking his third collaboration with Dindal following Disney Animation's The Emperor's New Groove (2000) and Chicken Little (2005). Snoop Dogg collaborated with Keith Urban on an original song for the film titled "Let It Roll", which was released as a single on April 12, 2024. Another single titled "Then There Was You" was released by Calum Scott in May 2024. On May 15, 2024, yet another single titled "Good Life", this time from Jon Batiste, was released. The soundtrack was released on May 17, 2024, by Republic Records.

A musical number titled "I'm Back" was sung by Hannah Waddingham for her character Jinx. However, Waddingham did not record it until after the 2023 SAG-AFTRA strike. Not long after recording, the crew discovered that they had run out of time to animate the song's sequence, and the song was subsequently cut from the film, but it does appear in the end credits of the final film, along with parts of the animatic of its sequence.

== Release ==
The Garfield Movie was theatrically released in international markets on May 1, 2024. The film had its US premiere at Grauman's Chinese Theatre in Los Angeles on May 19, 2024, and was released on May 24, 2024. It was previously scheduled for release domestically on February 16, 2024. The film was released in Hong Kong on June 22.

On May 12, 2024, the film had special previews in the United Kingdom in support of the charity MediCinema.

=== Home media ===
Sony Pictures Home Entertainment released the film on digital download on July 9, 2024, and it was made available on DVD and Blu-ray on August 27. It was also available on Netflix from September 21, 2024, to March 21, 2026. As of now, the film is available on Hulu.

=== Video game ===
In 2023, a video game based on the film was reported to be in development. However, it has yet to be released.

== Reception ==
=== Box office ===
The Garfield Movie grossed $91.9 million in the United States and Canada and $142.7 million in other territories, for a worldwide total of $257.2 million.

In the United States and Canada, The Garfield Movie was released alongside Furiosa: A Mad Max Saga and Sight, and was projected to gross around $30 million from 4,000 theaters in its four-day opening weekend. The film made $8.4 million on its first day, including $1.9 million from Thursday night previews. It went on to debut at $24.8 million (and a total of $31.1 million over the four days), finishing second behind Furiosa. In its second weekend, the film dropped 42% to $14 million, finishing in first.

The film opened in 18 countries on May 3, and grossed $22 million in its first weekend. Its largest markets were Mexico ($8.8 million), Spain ($3.2 million), Brazil ($2.2 million), Italy ($1.6 million), and Peru ($1.3 million).

=== Critical response ===
On the review aggregator website Rotten Tomatoes, 36% of 137 critics' reviews are positive, with an average rating of 4.8/10. The website's consensus reads: "The Garfield Movie rolls along at a zany enough clip to be diverting for kids, but this animated adventure doesn't much resemble Jim Davis' iconically grumpy creation." Metacritic, which uses a weighted average, assigned the film a score of 31 out of 100, based on 29 critics, indicating "generally unfavorable" reviews. Audiences polled by CinemaScore gave the film an average grade of "B+" on an A+ to F scale (the same as the live-action films), while those polled by PostTrak gave it an overall positive score of 73%.

In a negative review, Frank Scheck of The Hollywood Reporter criticized the film's unfaithfulness to the comic, writing, "As anyone familiar with cartoonist Jim Davis' iconic feline character knows, Garfield doesn't like to move around very much. He likes to eat, particularly pepperoni pizza and lasagna, and he likes to lie around and make sarcastic comments. In other words, he's not a cat of action. And yet for some reason, the creators of the new animated film revolving around him think that what the audience really wants is to watch Garfield engage in Mission: Impossible-style, stunt-laden violent mayhem." Brandon Yu of The New York Times criticized the quality of the animation, stating the film was "visually flat, with compositions that seem oddly half-populated and cheap", while a review in The Guardian went as far as to call it a "foul feline origin tale littered with product placement". A mixed review for TheWrap, however, praised certain aspects of the film mildly and conceded, "While this new film isn't especially funny it's still a reasonably enjoyable kids flick. It's short on laughs but surprisingly big on tenderness."

=== Accolades ===
The film was nominated at the 2024 Kids' Choice Awards for Favorite Animated Movie, but lost to another Columbia Pictures animated film Spider-Man: Across the Spider-Verse.

== Sequel ==
Upon the film's May 2016 announcement, it was revealed that Alcon intended to launch a franchise of Garfield films. In July 2025, it was reported that a sequel was in the works, with DNEG Animation returning and Chris Pratt set to reprise his voice role as Garfield and additionally serve as a producer. Mark Dindal will return as a director.
