= Garfield Minus Garfield =

Remix webcomic

- An example of a typical Garfield Minus Garfield strip
- Author: Dan Walsh
- Website: garfieldminusgarfield.net
- Current status/schedule: Infrequently updated
- Launch date: February 13, 2008
- Genre(s): Webcomic, constrained

Garfield Minus Garfield is a webcomic by Dan Walsh. Each strip of Garfield Minus Garfield is an edit of a comic strip from the comic Garfield, removing all instances of Garfield. Jim Davis, the creator of Garfield, approved of the project, and an official Garfield book (also called Garfield Minus Garfield) was published by his company. It was mainly edited comics by Walsh, with some comics contributed by Davis.

Garfield Minus Garfield is also the name of a strip published by Paws, Inc. using the same premise, which started in late 2008 and ended in 2020.

== Content ==
Garfield Minus Garfield is made from existing Garfield strips, which are edited to remove Garfield the cat and his thought bubbles from the image, as well as removing other characters such as Nermal and Odie. No other changes are made.

This leaves Jon Arbuckle alone in the strip, talking to himself. Creator Dan Walsh noted that since Garfield doesn't actually respond to Jon, but only thinks, all of Jon's conversations are in his head anyway. Walsh said that he deliberately chose strips that would make Jon seem as "metaphysically tormented" as possible, saying "If Jon is happy, my strips don't work."

New York Times columnist Cate Doty said of the result, "Without the cutesy thought-bubbles of his lasagna-loving cat, Jon's observations seem to teeter between existential crisis and deep despair."

In 2008, Walsh published a comic each day. Each comic took about five minutes to make.

== History ==
Garfield Minus Garfield was created by Dan Walsh, a technology manager from Dublin, Ireland. It started as a blog on Tumblr. The comic followed a number of other remixes of newspaper comic strips, such as The Dysfunctional Family Circus and Marmaduke Explained. Walsh said that he was not the first to come up with the idea of removing Garfield from his own strip, saying that "the idea had been floating around on message boards for a couple years before I started posting them... but I think it's fair to say I did champion and popularize it."

Jim Davis, the creator of Garfield, approved of the work, and in October 2008, Ballantine Books released a Garfield Minus Garfield book in full color, with the original comics alongside the altered ones. It is credited to Jim Davis, with a foreword written by Dan Walsh. Inside the book, however, most of the content is devoted to a section with "Garfield Minus Garfield Strips by Dan", followed in the end by "A word from Jim Davis" and a small section of Davis' own attempts at making Garfield Minus Garfield strips. A review in the New Yorker said that publishing the original comics next to the edited ones "vastly lessens the effect of 'Minus'" and was likely done to protect the Garfield brand. A Publishers Weekly review said that while Walsh's completely altered Davis's jokes, "Davis's stabs at the concept are mostly just gags about Garfield's owner, Jon Arbuckle."

Paws, Inc., the company which publishes Garfield, published its own strip on GoComics starting in November 2008. The strip was also named Garfield Minus Garfield and had the same premise. According to its "About" page, the Paws Inc. comic is "based on the phenomenon ignited by Dan Walsh's hilarious and wildly popular webcomic". Unlike Walsh's version, it also included the original Garfield strip underneath. Publication of Paws, Inc's version ceased in 2020 and is no longer on GoComics.

Walsh still occasionally publishes comics on his site.

== Reception ==
At its peak, the site received around 300,000 hits each day. The webcomic received attention from several major media outlets in 2008, such as The New York Times, NPR, Time, The Washington Post, Entertainment Weekly, The New Yorker, and the Boston Herald. A reviewer for Mother Jones called the strips "devastating (and hilarious) treatises on loneliness, without punch lines or jokes, reminiscent of the appallingly bleak early Peanuts strips." A writer for CBR said, "Jon's most consistent sidekick has been chronic depression... Removing Garfield from the equation brought those issues to the forefront." Publishers Weekly finished its review, "If Samuel Beckett had been a strip cartoonist, he might've produced something like this."

Garfield creator and artist Jim Davis commented on the webcomic, stating that he was an occasional reader and found it "fascinating" and that he was flattered by the imitation.

== Similar works ==
Mental Floss collected a list of Garfield edits; as well as Garfield Minus Garfield it noted De-Garfed (which just removes Garfield's thought balloons) and Realfield (which replaces Garfield with a more realistic cat that does not respond).
