= Garfield's Nightmare =

2007 video game

- Developer: Shin'en Multimedia
- Publisher: Game Factory
- Producer: Thomas Holdorf
- Designer: Peter Weiss
- Programmers: Manfred Linzner; Bernhard Wodok
- Composer: Matthias Gilch
- Platform: Nintendo DS
- Release: EU: March 9, 2007; AU: March 15, 2007; NA: August 28, 2007
- Genre: Platform
- Mode: Single player

Garfield's Nightmare is a platform game for the Nintendo DS, based on the popular comic strip Garfield. The game follows Garfield traveling through 16 levels trying to escape a nightmare.

== Plot ==
Garfield devises a plan to combine breakfast, lunch, and dinner to free up more time for his other activities. He stuffs several pizzas, lasagnas, and bags of jelly donuts into a massive sandwich and consumes it. However, this proves to be too much for him, and he gradually falls asleep, initiating his nightmare.

Garfield suddenly wakes up in a haunted castle. Instead of the real world, he has entered a surreal dream realm inhabited by monsters from his sub-conscious. Complicating matters further, Garfield had smashed his alarm clock in the real world. Now, his only hope of waking up lies in his ability to locate the shattered pieces and reassemble them.

== Gameplay ==
Garfield's Nightmare is a 2D platform game. The levels are divided into four sections, with each section having its own theme and a boss battle at the end. Bosses need to be terminated during these timeless fights, gradually enhancing the difficulty level. Each level has a bonus door, leading to a bonus game to collect extra lives, as well as a secret area in each level which contains an extra life.

== Reception ==
Reception

Aggregate score
Aggregator	Score
Metacritic	70/100

Review scores
Publication	Score
4Players	73%
GameZone	6.6/10
IGN	7/10
Nintendo Power	7/10
PALGN	4/10

The game received "average" reviews according to the review aggregation website Metacritic. Chris Adams of IGN describes the game as a "simple hop and bop kids game" with impressive visuals for the DS.

== See also ==
A ride that shared the game's name was opened at Kennywood Park near Pittsburgh in 2004. The boat ride was originally called "The Old Mill", but was rebranded with a Garfield theme until 2020 when it was changed back to The Old Mill.
