= Garfield: A Tail of Two Kitties =

2006 film directed by Tim Hill

- Film poster
- Directed by: Tim Hill
- Written by: Joel Cohen; Alec Sokolow
- Based on: Garfield by Jim Davis
- Produced by: John Davis
- Starring: Breckin Meyer; Jennifer Love Hewitt; Billy Connolly; Bill Murray
- Cinematography: Peter Lyons Collister
- Edited by: Peter S. Elliot
- Music by: Christophe Beck
- Production companies: Davis Entertainment Company; Dune Entertainment; Major Studio Partners; Ingenious Film Partners
- Distributed by: 20th Century Fox
- Release dates: June 16, 2006 (United States); July 21, 2006 (United Kingdom)
- Running time: 85 minutes
- Countries: United States; United Kingdom
- Language: English
- Budget: $60 million
- Box office: $143.3 million

Garfield: A Tail of Two Kitties (also released as Garfield 2 in some countries) is a 2006 comedy film directed by Tim Hill and written by Joel Cohen and Alec Sokolow. A sequel to Garfield: The Movie (2004), it stars Breckin Meyer, Jennifer Love Hewitt and Bill Murray reprising their respective roles as Jon Arbuckle, Dr. Liz Wilson and the voice of Garfield, with Billy Connolly, Ian Abercrombie, Roger Rees, Lucy Davis and Oliver Muirhead in live-action roles and Tim Curry, Bob Hoskins, Rhys Ifans, Vinnie Jones, Joe Pasquale, Richard E. Grant and Jane Leeves in voice roles. The film, loosely inspired by Mark Twain's novel The Prince and the Pauper, follows Garfield, who follows Jon and Liz to the United Kingdom alongside Odie. After Garfield inadvertently swaps places with a royal cat named Prince, who physically resembles Garfield and has inherited his late owner's castle, the two come into conflict with Lord Dargis (Connolly), the nephew of Prince's owner, who seeks the castle for himself.

Garfield: A Tail of Two Kitties was released by 20th Century Fox in the United States on June 16, 2006, and the United Kingdom on July 21. The film received mostly negative reviews from critics, and earned $143 million against a budget of $60 million.

== Plot ==
Two years after the arrest of Happy Chapman (Note: As depicted in Garfield: The Movie (2004)), Jon Arbuckle plans to propose to his girlfriend, Elizabeth "Liz" Wilson, who is going on a business trip to London. Garfield is unhappy about Jon's plans. Jon follows Liz to the United Kingdom as a surprise; after escaping from a kennel, Jon's pets, Garfield and Odie, sneak into Jon's luggage and join him on the trip. Garfield and Odie break out of Jon's hotel room due to boredom and subsequently get lost on the streets of London.

Meanwhile, at Carlyle Castle in the English countryside, the late Lady Eleanor Carlyle's will is read by the solicitors. She bequeaths Carlyle Castle to Prince XII, her beloved cat who looks exactly like Garfield. This infuriates the Lady's nephew, Lord Manfred Dargis, who will now only inherit the grand estate once Prince dies. Dargis traps Prince in a picnic basket and throws him into the river. This news quickly spreads amongst the assorted animals Prince governs over, both inside and outside of the castle. Jon finds Prince climbing out of a drain and takes him to the hotel after mistaking him for Garfield, while Prince's butler, Smithee, finds Garfield in the street and takes him to Carlyle Castle after mistaking him for Prince.

In the grand estate, Garfield receives a great deal of special treatment from both Smithee and Prince's animal followers led by his loyal bulldog majordomo, Winston. He convinces the other animals to tolerate and protect Garfield in order to prevent Dargis from getting his hands on the estate, which he plans to turn into a resort by demolishing the area and slaughtering them all. With Garfield's presence, Dargis thinks Prince has returned and fears that the solicitors will not sign the estate over for him. He makes many attempts to dispose of Garfield, but fails every time due to the animals interfering. Garfield befriends the animals and teaches them how to make lasagna, while Prince learns how to be an ordinary pet. Despite them both enjoying their new lifestyles, they soon begin to miss their old lives, Garfield especially after overhearing the animals complaining about his slovenly and greedy demeanour.

Garfield and Prince eventually meet each other face to face after both attempting to return to their old lives. Garfield, having understood what is at stake for Prince and his subjects, convinces a reluctant Prince to attempt to defeat Dargis. Jon and Odie discover the mix-up and go to the castle, which Liz is visiting.

Garfield and Prince taunt Dargis, whose plan is exposed, and the duo are seen by the solicitors. A blunderbuss-wielding Dargis threatens the solicitors into signing the estate over to him, while also taking Liz hostage. Jon attempts to force Dargis to release Liz, only for Dargis to threaten to kill him for getting involved in the first place. Jon, with the help of the animals, manages to defeat him as Smithee alerts the authorities and Dargis is arrested for his crimes. Garfield, previously reluctant about Jon and Liz becoming engaged, has a change of heart; he helps Jon propose to Liz and she accepts.

== Cast ==
=== Live-action cast ===
- Breckin Meyer as Jon Arbuckle, the owner of Garfield and Odie.
- Jennifer Love Hewitt as Dr. Liz Wilson, Jon's veterinarian girlfriend/fiancée.
- Billy Connolly as Lord Manfred Dargis, a cruel lord who wants to remodel Carlyle Castle into condominiums.
- Ian Abercrombie as Smithee, the Carlyle Castle butler.
- Roger Rees as Mr. Hobbs, a solicitor.
- Lucy Davis as Abby Westminister, a solicitor.
- Jane Carr as Mrs. Whitney, a solicitor.
- Oliver Muirhead as Mr. Greene, a solicitor.
- Ben Falcone as an American tourist.
- JB Blanc as a porter at the hotel in London.

=== Voice cast ===
- Bill Murray as Garfield, an orange tabby cat who loves lasagna.
- Tim Curry as Prince XII, an English cat who bears an identical resemblance to Garfield.
- Bob Hoskins as Winston, a loyal bulldog who serves as Prince's majordomo.
- Greg Ellis as Nigel, a ferret.
- Vinnie Jones as Rommel, a rottweiler who is Lord Dargis's companion.
- Jim Piddock as Bolero, a Spanish Fighting Bull.
- Joe Pasquale as Claudius, a rat.
- Rhys Ifans as McBunny, a Scottish-accented Belgian hare.
- Richard E. Grant as Preston, a Scarlet macaw.
- Sharon Osbourne as Christophe, a goose.
- Jane Leeves as Eenie, a duck.
- Jane Horrocks as Meenie, another duck.
- Roscoe Lee Browne as the narrator.

== Release ==
=== Home media ===
Garfield: A Tail of Two Kitties was released on DVD on October 10, 2006, by 20th Century Fox Home Entertainment. The DVD includes a "Drawing with Jim Davis" featurette, teaching viewers how to draw Garfield, Odie and Garfield's teddy bear Pooky, and two games: Garfield's Maze, and Odie's Photo Album. It also includes a music video, trailers, featurettes, a new Garfield comic strip by creator Jim Davis, and an extended version of the film with eight minutes of footage not seen in theaters. The film was released in a 3-disc Blu-ray/DVD/digital copy combo pack on October 11, 2011, alongside its predecessor.

== Reception ==
=== Box office ===
Garfield: A Tail of Two Kitties grossed $28.4 million in North America, and $113.3 million in other countries, for a worldwide total of $141.7 million. The film opened to number seven in its first weekend, grossing $7.3 million. According to 20th Century Fox, the studio was aware that the film would not make as much as the first, and only made it based on the worldwide success of the first film.

=== Critical response ===
On Rotten Tomatoes, the film has a rating of 12% from 78 surveyed critics, with an average rating of 3.5/10. The site's critical consensus reads, "Strictly for (very) little kids, A Tale of Two Kitties features skilled voice actors but a plot that holds little interest." On Metacritic, the film has a weighted average score of 37 out of 100 based on reviews from 20 critics, indicating "generally unfavorable" reviews. Audiences polled by CinemaScore gave the film an average grade of "B+" on an A+ to F scale, the same grade earned by its predecessor.

Joe Leydon of Variety gave the film a positive review, saying "Good kitty! Superior in every way to its underwhelming predecessor, Garfield: A Tail of Two Kitties is a genuinely clever kidpic that should delight moppets, please parents – and maybe tickle a few tweens." Janice Page of The Boston Globe gave the film one and a half stars out of four, saying "You'll only be attracted to Garfield: A Tail of Two Kitties if you're very young, you're very easily entertained, or you just can't get enough of Jim Davis's lasagna-scarfing cartoon cat." Roger Ebert gave the film three out of four stars, saying "Garfield: A Tail of Two Kitties is actually funnier and more charming than the first film." Elizabeth Weitzman of New York Daily News gave the film one and a half stars out of four, saying "Connolly, bless him, throws himself heartily into the task of acting opposite a computer-generated cat given to bad puns and flatulence. Everyone else, however, looks mortified, and can you blame them?" Peter Hartlaub of the San Francisco Chronicle gave the film one out of four stars, saying "The best thing that can be said about Garfield: A Tail of Two Kitties is that the movie isn't quite as bad as its name." Nathan Rabin of The A.V. Club gave the film a C, saying "Two Kitties marks a considerable improvement over its predecessor. It's faster paced and the filmmakers wisely shift the focus away from bland owner Breckin Meyer and onto a menagerie of chattering animals. After a dreadful first entry, Two Kitties elevates the Garfield series almost to the level of mediocrity." Claudia Puig of USA Today gave the film one and a half stars out of four, saying "It comes off like a coughed-up furball: a wan rehash with too many elements of the hard-to-swallow 2004 original."

=== Accolades ===
The film was nominated for two Golden Raspberry Awards in 2006, one in the category "Worst Prequel or Sequel", and one in the category "Worst Excuse for Family Entertainment", but they both lost to Basic Instinct 2 and RV, respectively.
