= Garfield: The Movie =

2004 film by Peter Hewitt

- Theatrical release poster
- Directed by: Peter Hewitt
- Written by: Joel Cohen; Alec Sokolow
- Based on: Garfield by Jim Davis
- Produced by: John Davis
- Starring: Breckin Meyer; Jennifer Love Hewitt; Stephen Tobolowsky; Bill Murray
- Cinematography: Dean Cundey
- Edited by: Michael A. Stevenson; Peter E. Berger
- Music by: Christophe Beck
- Production company: Davis Entertainment Company
- Distributed by: 20th Century Fox
- Release dates: June 6, 2004 (Hollywood); June 11, 2004 (United States)
- Running time: 80 minutes
- Country: United States
- Language: English
- Budget: $50 million
- Box office: $208 million

Garfield: The Movie (also simply known as Garfield) is a 2004 American comedy film based on Jim Davis' comic strip of the same name. The film was directed by Peter Hewitt from a screenplay by Joel Cohen and Alec Sokolow. Combining live action and animation, it stars Breckin Meyer, Jennifer Love Hewitt, and Stephen Tobolowsky, with Bill Murray as the voice of the title character. The plot follows Garfield, who, after becoming jealous of the recently adopted Odie, sets out to rescue him after he is stolen by television personality Happy Chapman.

Produced by Davis Entertainment Company, Garfield: The Movie premiered in Hollywood on June 6, 2004, before being theatrically released in the United States on June 11, 2004, by 20th Century Fox. It received negative reviews from critics and grossed $208 million worldwide on a $50 million budget. A sequel, Garfield: A Tail of Two Kitties, was released in 2006.

== Plot ==
Garfield is a lazy, overweight cat who lives with his owner Jon Arbuckle. Garfield spends his days tormenting Jon and outwitting his vicious Dobermann neighbor, Luca; is friends with Louis the mouse; and socializes with his fellow neighborhood cats, Nermal and Arlene.

Jon begins taking Garfield to the veterinarian in order to see Dr. Liz Wilson, with whom Jon is in love. Jon tries to ask Liz out, but due to a misunderstanding, she gives him a dog named Odie. Garfield immediately becomes jealous of Odie and competes with him for Jon's attention. Jon later takes Odie to a dog show, where Liz is a judge, with Garfield stowing away. Garfield is chased by other dogs, leading Odie to the stage, where he does a successful improvised dance. Happy Chapman, a television personality who is also a judge, is impressed with Odie's performance and unsuccessfully offers Jon a television deal for Odie.

When a fed-up Garfield returns home, he hits a ball against a lamp, inadvertently causing a chain reaction that leaves the house in disarray. Jon discovers the mess and kicks Garfield outside for the night. When Odie comes out to comfort Garfield, he gets inside and locks Odie out. Odie consequently runs away, before being found by the elderly Mrs. Baker. Jon, not wanting Liz to know that Odie is missing, searches for him; Luca, Nermal, and Arlene express disappointment at Garfield's treatment of Odie. Jon eventually tells Liz about Odie's disappearance, and she agrees to help him search.

Meanwhile, Chapman, allergic to cats and seeking to replace his companion Persnikitty, is envious of his news anchor brother Walter and dreams to perform on Good Day New York. Chapman and his assistant Wendell find Mrs. Baker's notice for Odie and, recognizing him from the dog show, claim Odie as Chapman's own. Garfield sees Odie and Chapman on TV and tries unsuccessfully to alert Jon. Garfield thus resolves to rescue Odie himself, as an unaware Jon asks Liz to help search for him as well. They learn of Chapman claiming Odie from Mrs. Baker, leading Jon to assume that Chapman also took Garfield. With Louis' help, Garfield enters the broadcast tower through its air vents and finds Odie locked in a cage. Chapman fits a shock collar to Odie, which administers electric shocks that force Odie to perform tricks when activated.

Chapman and Wendell leave for the train station, with Garfield pursuing. However, an animal control officer intercepts Garfield, believing him to be a stray. He is taken to a shelter, where Persnikitty, calling himself "Sir Roland", is among the occupants. After Garfield tells the other animals of his situation, they resolve to help him, and work together to escape. Chapman boards a New York-bound train, with Odie in the luggage car. After arriving too late to catch up, Garfield sneaks into the control room and manages to return Chapman's train to the station. Garfield frees Odie, but the two are chased and eventually cornered by Chapman. Chapman threatens Odie with the shock collar, but Garfield's friends from the shelter, alongside Louis and a local rat colony, attack Chapman and place the collar around his neck. Garfield and Odie incapacitate Chapman by activating the collar.

Jon and Liz arrive to find Chapman, who Jon punches for stealing his pets. Garfield, Odie, Jon, and Liz reunite and return home, while Chapman is arrested. Garfield receives a hero's welcome, regains the other animals' respect and accepts Odie as a friend, while Jon and Liz form a relationship.

== Cast ==
=== Live-action cast ===
- Breckin Meyer as Jon Arbuckle, Garfield and Odie's owner.
- Jennifer Love Hewitt as Dr. Liz Wilson, Garfield's vet, and Jon's love interest.
- Stephen Tobolowsky as Happy Chapman, a local television host, and his brother Walter J. Chapman, a TV news journalist who reports on relevant events.
- Evan Arnold as Wendell, Happy's butler.
- Mark Christopher Lawrence as Christopher Mello, Happy's co-host.
- Eve Brent as Mrs. Baker, an old woman who rescues Odie.
- Juliette Goglia as Little Girl, a girl who tries to adopt Persnikitty from Animal Control.
- Evan Helmuth as Steward
- Joe Bays as Raccoon Lodge Member
- Leyna Nguyen as News Reporter (Abby), Walter's co-worker.
- Joe Ochman as Engineer, a worker at the Telegraph Tower.
- Rufus Gifford as Dog Owner #1

Garfield creator Jim Davis appeared as an uncredited drunken convention attendee, but his role was cut from the final version of the film.

=== Voice cast ===
- Bill Murray as Garfield, Jon's overweight, cynical and laid-back orange cat.
- Alan Cumming as Persnikitty, an uptight cat.
- Nick Cannon as Louis, a quick-witted mouse.
- David Eigenberg as Nermal, Garfield's naïve best friend.
- Brad Garrett as Luca, an aggressive and slightly dense Doberman Pinscher with a deep voice who guards the house next door to Garfield.
- Jimmy Kimmel as Spanky (unnamed in the film)
- Debra Messing as Arlene, Garfield's love interest.
- Richard Kind as Dad Rat
- Debra Jo Rupp as Mom Rat
- Wyatt Smith, Jordan Kaiser and Alyson Stoner as unnamed kid rats – Kid Rat No. 1, Kid Rat No. 2 and Kid Rat No. 3 respectively

== Production ==
Thom Huge had retired in 2001, so Jon Arbuckle needed a new voice actor. Jim Carrey was considered for his role. Ewan McGregor, Chris Rock, Jack Black, Hugh Jackman, Adam Sandler, Martin Lawrence, Ryan Reynolds, Will Ferrell, and Ben Stiller were also considered for the role as Jon, but all dropped out, with Ferrell and Stiller already being busy with Anchorman and Dodgeball, respectively. Jennifer Garner, Ashley Judd, Halle Berry, Jennifer Aniston, Christina Ricci, Natalie Portman, Jessica Alba, Angelina Jolie, Catherine Zeta-Jones, and Cameron Diaz were considered for the role of Liz, but all dropped out. Brad Dourif, Stephen Root, Thomas Lennon, and Michael Ironside were considered to play Happy Chapman. Ironside was cast, but he dropped out after one day for unknown reasons. Lennon was busy on Reno 911!, and Root also dropped out in favor of Dodgeball. Lorenzo Music died 3 years earlier, so Garfield also needed a new voice actor. Jack Nicholson was considered for his role; he was the only candidate besides Bill Murray. According to Murray's Reddit AMA, he was interested in voicing the titular character because he mistook the screenplay writer's name, Joel Cohen, for Joel Coen of the Coen brothers. He accepted the role, briefly skimming through the script. Co-writer Alec Sokolow disputed Murray's claim in 2014: "He knew it was not Joel Coen well before he met Joel Cohen. It's a funny take. And it kind of defends him against the criticism of making such an overtly commercial film. But, it's complete horse shit." According to Jim Davis, Murray recorded his dialogue in his apartment in New York City and on the set of The Life Aquatic with Steve Zissou in Greece.

Principal photography began on March 10 and wrapped on June 12, 2003. The animation for Garfield was produced by Rhythm & Hues Studios. Visual effects were produced by SW Digital, Pixel Magic and The Orphanage.

The film's score was composed by Canadian composer Christophe Beck. The soundtrack album was released through Bulletproof Records on October 19, 2004, the same day as its home video release. The soundtrack contained the Baha Men single, "Holla!", which also appeared on the film's opening and end credits, which was also the name of the band's album that was released the same month on the film's theatrical release.

== Release ==
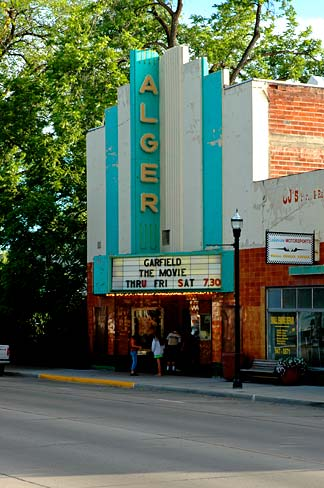
Garfield: The Movie on the marquee of a theater in Lakeview, Oregon

Garfield: The Movie was released in theaters on June 11, 2004, one week before Garfield's 26th anniversary. During its theatrical run, it was preceded by an Ice Age short film, Gone Nutty. 20th Century Fox Home Entertainment released the film on VHS and DVD on October 19, 2004. The special features include behind-the-scenes footage, deleted scenes, and the Baha Men music video "Holla!". The film was released in a 3-disc Blu-ray on October 11, 2011.

== Reception ==
=== Box office ===
On its opening weekend, the film debuted on 3,094 theaters and earned $21.7 million. The film grossed $75.3 million in the United States and Canada, and $132.7 million from international markets, accumulating $208 million worldwide.

=== Critical response ===
On review aggregator Rotten Tomatoes, 14% of 135 critics' reviews are positive, with an average rating of 3.52/10. The site's critical consensus reads, "When the novelty of the CGI Garfield wears off, what's left is a simplistic kiddie movie." On Metacritic, the film has a score of 27 out of 100 based on 31 critics, indicating "generally unfavorable" reviews. Audiences polled by CinemaScore gave the film an average grade of "B+" on an A+ to F scale.

Roger Ebert rated it three out of four stars, saying the film was "charming". Joe Leydon of Variety wrote, "Only very small children still easily impressed by interaction of human actors and CGI quadrupeds will be amused by Garfield." A. O. Scott of The New York Times wrote, "That Garfield speaks in the supercilious, world-weary drawl of Bill Murray is some small consolation, as are a few of the animal tricks."

== Legacy ==
=== Sequel ===
A sequel, titled Garfield: A Tail of Two Kitties, was released on June 16, 2006, in North America. Murray, Meyer, and Love Hewitt reprised their roles, and like its predecessor, it received negative reviews.

=== Direct-to-video films and animated film ===
Three direct-to-DVD films were released in 2007, 2008, and 2009. 20th Century Fox allowed their license with Paws, Inc. to expire in 2009. On May 24, 2016, it was announced that Alcon Entertainment would develop a new computer-animated Garfield film with John Cohen and Steven P. Wegner ready to produce and to be directed by Mark Dindal, director of Cats Don't Dance, The Emperor's New Groove and Chicken Little. On November 1, 2021, it was announced that Chris Pratt would voice Garfield in the upcoming animated film, and that Sony Pictures would distribute the film worldwide through their Columbia Pictures label except China. On May 24, 2022, Samuel L. Jackson was added to the cast of the film. On August 3, 2022, it was announced that the film would be released on February 16, 2024, but it was later delayed to May 24, 2024.
