= Garfield =

Comic strip created by Jim Davis

- Center: Garfield (clockwise from bottom-left: Nermal, Odie, Arlene, and Pooky)
- Author: Jim Davis
- Owner: Paws, Inc. (Viacom, 2019) (Skydance, since 2019)
- Website: www.gocomics.com/garfield
- Current status/schedule: Running/daily
- Launch date: June 19, 1978; 48 years ago
- Syndicate(s): Universal Press Syndicate/Universal Uclick/Andrews McMeel Syndication (1994–present); United Feature Syndicate (1978–1994)
- Publisher(s): Random House (under Ballantine Books), occasionally Andrews McMeel Publishing
- Genre(s): Gag-a-day; Humor
- Preceded by: Jon (1976–1977) and Garfield (1977–1978), locally published strips in the Pendleton Times-Post

Garfield is an American comic strip and media franchise created by Jim Davis. Originally published locally as Jon in 1976 (later changed to Garfield in 1977), then in nationwide syndication from 1978, it chronicles the life of the title character Garfield, a lazy, gluttonous, and sarcastic cat, along with a dim-witted dog named Odie and their human owner, Jon Arbuckle. As of 2013, it was syndicated in roughly 2,580 newspapers and journals; the comic held the Guinness World Record for being the world's most widely syndicated comic strip. Though the strip's setting is rarely mentioned in print, the television special Happy Birthday, Garfield states that Garfield lives in Muncie, Indiana, the hometown of the creator Jim Davis. The strip frequently focuses on Garfield's appetite, laziness, and interactions with other characters.

Garfield has been adapted into various forms of media. Several animated half-hour television specials aired on CBS between 1982 and 1991, starting with Here Comes Garfield and ending with Garfield Gets a Life. Also airing on CBS from 1988 to 1994 was the animated series Garfield and Friends, which additionally adapted Davis' comic strip U.S. Acres. All of these featured Lorenzo Music as the voice of Garfield. The feature film Garfield: The Movie was released in 2004, followed by its sequel, Garfield: A Tail of Two Kitties, in 2006. Both were live-action featuring a computer-animated Garfield voiced by Bill Murray. Another animated TV adaptation, The Garfield Show, aired on France 3 in France and Cartoon Network in the United States from 2008 to 2015. Another animated TV adaptation, Garfield Originals, aired on France 3 from 2019 to 2020. In addition, Garfield has been the subject of merchandise, video games, books, and other spin-off merchandise. The strip has also been re-published in compilations; the first of these, Garfield at Large (1980), developed what came to be known as the "Garfield format" for re-publication of newspaper comics in book form.

On August 6, 2019, New York City–based Viacom (now Skydance Corporation) announced that it would acquire Paws, Inc., including most rights to the Garfield franchise (the comic strip, merchandise and animated cartoons). The deal did not include the rights to the live-action Garfield films, which are still owned by The Walt Disney Company through its 20th Century Studios label, as well as The Garfield Movie (2024), released by Alcon Entertainment and Sony Pictures under its Columbia Pictures label. An animated series is in production for Paramount+ and is set for release on December 11, 2026.

== Premise ==
Garfield is an obese anthropomorphic orange tabby cat. His personality is defined by his sarcasm, laziness, and gluttony, particularly his love of lasagna. His owner is Jon Arbuckle, a man with an affinity for stereotypically nerdy pastimes. Jon's other pet is Odie, a dim-witted yellow dog. Early in the strip's run, Jon was roommates with another man named Lyman, who was also originally declared to be Odie's owner before his disappearance from the comic.

Most strips center around interactions among the three main characters and their conflicting personalities. For much of the strip's history, one recurring theme was Jon's unsuccessful attempts at dating, particularly involving the pets' veterinarian, Dr. Liz Wilson. However, after a 2006 story arc, the two engaged and started living together. Many strips feature Jon, Garfield, and Odie visiting Jon's unnamed parents and brother Doc Boy on their family farm. Other side characters include various mice and spiders within the house, both frequent targets of abuse and scorn from Garfield; Garfield's teddy bear Pooky; Garfield's girlfriend Arlene, a pink cat; Nermal, a gray striped kitten who enjoys tormenting Garfield over his perceived age; and various other pets who live in the neighborhood.

== History ==
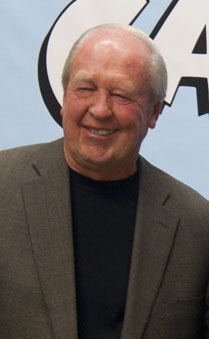
Cartoonist Jim Davis is the creator of Garfield.

=== Before Garfield ===
Cartoonist Jim Davis was born in Marion, Indiana, and raised on a farm in Fairmount, Indiana. In 1973, while working as an assistant for T.K. Ryan's Tumbleweeds, he created the comic strip Gnorm Gnat, which ran in the Pendleton Times of Pendleton, Indiana, from 1973 to 1975 and met with little success. Davis had tried to syndicate the strip, but was unsuccessful; he noted that one editor told him that his "art was good, his gags were great, [but] nobody can identify with bugs." Davis decided to review current comic strips to determine what types of animal characters might be more popular. He felt that dogs were well represented, but noticed that there were no prominent cat characters.

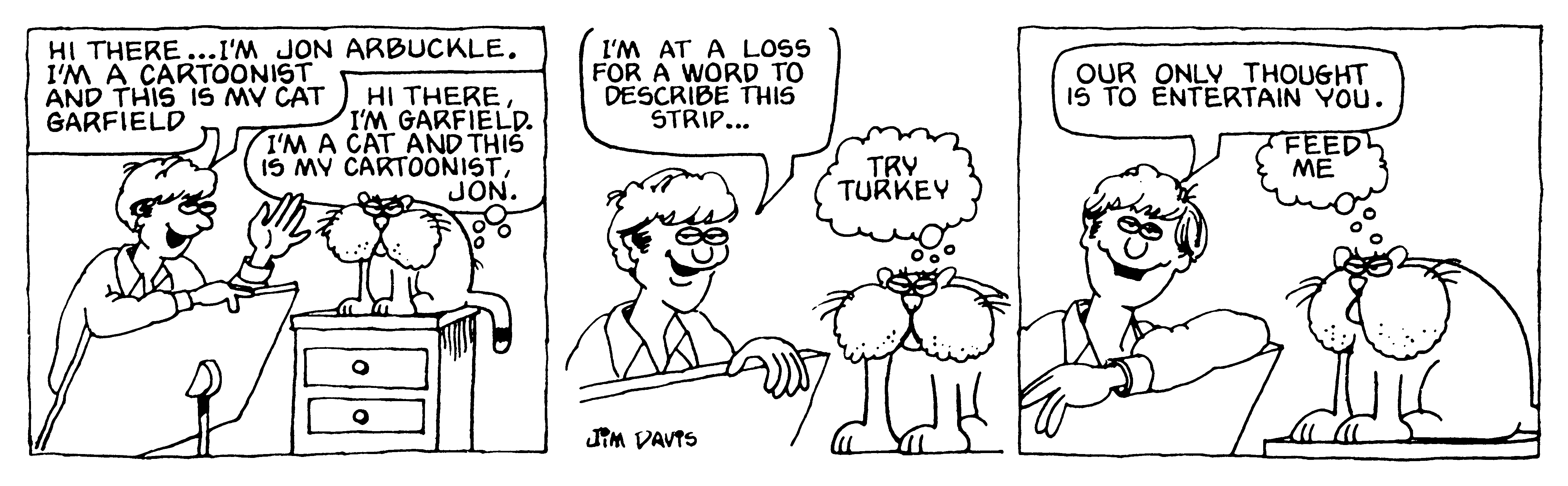
The first Jon strip, which ran in the Pendleton Times on January 8, 1976. It was redrawn as the first Garfield strip published on June 19, 1978, with the dialogue in the second panel removed and Garfield's line in the first panel moved there.

The title character of Garfield was inspired by the cats Davis grew up with. He was named after Davis' grandfather, James A. Garfield Davis, whose personality also influenced the character; Davis described him as "a large, cantankerous man". Garfield's owner, Jon Arbuckle, was named after businessman John Arbuckle, who Davis had heard mentioned in a commercial for Yuban Instant Coffee. Jon's roommate, Lyman, was introduced to provide Jon with a conversational foil and was named after a character from Davis' earlier comic strip, Gnorm Gnat. Lyman's dog was originally named Spot, but was later renamed to Odie to avoid confusion with another comic-strip dog of the same name in Boner's Ark. From 1976 to early 1978, these characters appeared in a comic strip titled Jon, which was published in the Pendleton Times. In 1977, the strip was renamed Garfield. For many years, Jon remained largely unavailable to the public until 2019, YouTuber Quinton Kyle Hoover found several microfilm archives of the Jon publications from the Pendleton Community Library and Indiana State Library. Jon first appeared in the Pendleton Times on January 8, 1976, two weeks after Gnorm Gnat ended.

=== Syndication ===
In March 1978, United Feature Syndicate accepted the strip for national distribution (which had been retitled Garfield on September 1, 1977), and the last Pendleton Times strip ran on March 2, 1978. United Feature Syndicate debuted the first strip nationwide in 41 newspapers, starting on June 19, 1978. After a test run, the Chicago Sun-Times dropped the Garfield strip, only to reinstate it after readers' complaints.

The appearance of the characters gradually changed over time; the left panel is from the March 7, 1980, strip; the right is from the July 6, 1990, strip

The strip underwent significant stylistic changes, evolving from the style of the 1976–83 strips, to a more cartoonish visual style from 1984 onward. This change has mainly affected Garfield's design, which underwent a "Darwinian evolution" in which he began walking on his hind legs, "slimmed down", and became more expressive. According to creator Jim Davis, these changes made the character easier to animate and stage in visual gags, such as pushing Odie off a table or reaching for food. The redesign was in part on the advice of Davis' mentor and erstwhile rival Charles M. Schulz. Although he regarded Garfield as less subtle than his own strip, Peanuts, he provided valuable guidance, particularly in licensing and merchandising. Davis later applied many of these strategies to the Garfield franchise.

Garfield quickly became a commercial success. By the beginning of 1981, less than three years after its nationwide launch, the strip was in 850 newspapers and had sold over $15 million in merchandise. To manage the merchandise, Davis founded Paws, Inc. In 1982 the strip was appearing in more than 1,000 newspapers.

By 2002, Garfield became the world's most syndicated strip, appearing in 2,570 newspapers with 263 million readers worldwide; by 2004, Garfield appeared in nearly 2,600 newspapers and sold from $750 million to $1 billion worth of merchandise in 111 countries. In 1994, Davis' company, Paws, Inc., purchased all rights to the strips from 1978 to 1993 from United Feature.

While retaining creative control and being the only person to whom the strip is credited in newspapers, Davis now only writes and usually does the rough sketches. Since the late 1990s, most of the work has been done by long-time assistants Brett Koth and Gary Barker. Inking and coloring work is done by other artists, while Davis spends most of the time supervising production and merchandising the characters.

== Content ==
Part of the strip's broad pop cultural appeal is due to its lack of social or political commentary; though this was Davis' original intention, he also admitted that his "grasp of politics isn't strong", joking that, for many years, he thought "OPEC was a denture adhesive".

Originally created with the intentions to "come up with a good, marketable character", Jim Davis had observed that "dogs were popular in the funny papers, but there wasn't a strip for the nation's 15 million cat owners. Then, he consciously developed a stable of recurring, repetitive jokes for the cat." Davis recognized that the canine character Snoopy was responsible for the success of merchandise and licensing of the Peanuts comic strip; Peanuts creator Charles Schulz expressed irritation at the subsequent popularity of Garfield.

Garfield has spawned merchandise earning $750 million to $1 billion annually. In addition to the various merchandise and commercial tie-ins, the strip has spawned several animated television specials, two animated television series, two theatrical feature-length live-action animated films, three fully computer-animated direct-to-video films, and a theatrical computer-animated film.

== Marketing ==
As one of the world's most syndicated comic strips, Garfield has spawned a "profusion" of merchandise including clothing, toys, games, books, Caribbean cruises, credit cards, dolls, DVDs of the movies or the TV series, and related media. In April 2024, Motel 6 announced Garfield as their first "Chief Pet Officer" and Garfield-themed rooms for the release of The Garfield Movie.

== Media ==
=== Books ===
Since 1980, the strip has been compiled in anthology books. The first, Garfield at Large, was published in March 1980 by Ballantine Books. These books helped increase the strip's popularity through sales, leading to several of them reaching the top of the New York Times best-seller list. For these compilation books, Davis devised a book layout which is considerably longer and less tall than the average book. This allowed the strip to be oriented in the same format as it appeared in the newspaper, as opposed to earlier comic strip anthologies which often stacked the panels vertically. This book style has since been referred to in the publishing industry as the "Garfield format" and has been adapted by other publishers. Davis noted that it became popular for other comic strip anthologies in particular, such as those of The Far Side.

=== Internet ===
Garfield.com was the strip's official website, which contained archives of past strips along with games and an online store. Jim Davis had also collaborated with Ball State University and Pearson Digital Learning to create ProfessorGarfield.org, an educational website with interactive games focusing on math and reading skills, and with Children's Technology Group to create MindWalker, a web browser that allows parents to limit the websites their children can view to a preset list.

A variety of edited Garfield strips have been made available on the Internet, with some being hosted on their own unofficial, dedicated sites. Dating from 2005, a site titled the "Garfield Randomizer" created a three-panel strip using panels from previous Garfield strips. Another variation along the same lines, called "Realfield" or "Realistic Garfield", was to redraw Garfield as a real cat and remove his thought balloons. Still another approach to editing the strips involved removing Garfield and other main characters from the originals completely, leaving Jon talking to himself. While strips in this vein could be found online as early as 2006, the 2008 site Garfield Minus Garfield by Dan Walsh received enough online attention to be covered by news media. Reception was largely positive: at its peak, the site received as many as 300,000 hits per day. Fans connected with Jon's "loneliness and desperation" and found his "crazy antics" humorous; Jim Davis himself called Walsh's strips an "inspired thing to do" and said that "some of [the strips] work better [than the originals]". Ballantine Books, which publishes the Garfield books, released a volume of Garfield Minus Garfield strips on October 28, 2008. The volume retains Davis as author and features a foreword by Walsh.

=== Television ===
Voice actors
Characters	The Fantastic Funnies	Garfield Television Specials	Television series				Direct-to-DVD films			Theatrical films		
Characters	The Fantastic Funnies	Garfield Television Specials	Garfield and Friends	The Garfield Show	Garfield Originals	Garfield	Garfield Gets Real	Garfield's Fun Fest	Garfield's Pet Force	Garfield: The Movie	Garfield: A Tail of Two Kitties	The Garfield Movie
Characters	1980	1982–1991	1988–1994	2008–2015	2019–2020	2026–present	2007	2008	2009	2004	2006	2024
Garfield	Scott Beach	Lorenzo Music	Lorenzo Music	Frank Welker	Gérard Surugue	Lamorne Morris	Frank Welker	Frank Welker	Frank Welker	Bill Murray	Bill Murray	Chris Pratt
Jon Arbuckle	Thom Huge	Sandy Kenyon	Thom Huge	Wally Wingert	Bruno Choël	Joe Brogie	Wally Wingert	Wally Wingert	Wally Wingert	Breckin Meyer	Breckin Meyer	Nicholas Hoult
Jon Arbuckle	Thom Huge	Thom Huge	Thom Huge	Wally Wingert	Bruno Choël	Joe Brogie	Wally Wingert	Wally Wingert	Wally Wingert	Breckin Meyer	Breckin Meyer	Nicholas Hoult
Odie		Gregg Berger	Gregg Berger	Gregg Berger	Antoine Schoumsky	Dave H. Johnson	Gregg Berger	Gregg Berger	Gregg Berger	Uncredited dog	Uncredited dog	Harvey Guillén
Dr. Liz Wilson		Julie K. Payne	Julie K. Payne	Julie K. Payne	Véronique Soufflet	Molly Bernard				Jennifer Love Hewitt	Jennifer Love Hewitt	Dev Joshi
Nermal			Desirée Goyette	Jason Marsden	Véronique Soufflet	Alex Cazares	Jason Marsden	Jason Marsden	Jason Marsden	David Eigenberg		Silent cameo
Arlene			Silent cameo	Audrey Wasilewski	Véronique Soufflet	Michelle Ortiz	Audrey Wasilewski	Audrey Wasilewski	Audrey Wasilewski	Debra Messing		

Garfield's animation debut was on The Fantastic Funnies, which aired on CBS on May 15, 1980, voiced by actor Scott Beach. Garfield was one of the strips featured, introduced as a newcomer (the strip was only two years old at the time). From 1982 to 1991, twelve primetime Garfield cartoon specials and one hour-long primetime documentary celebrating the character's 10th anniversary were aired; Lorenzo Music voiced Garfield in all of them. A Saturday-morning cartoon show, Garfield and Friends, aired for seven seasons from 1988 to 1994. This adaptation also starred Music as the voice of Garfield.

The Garfield Show, a CGI series, started development in 2007 to coincide with the strip's 30th anniversary in 2008. It premiered in France in December 2008 and made its U.S. debut on Cartoon Network on November 2, 2009.

In March 2026, a new Garfield series was picked up by Paramount+. Lamorne Morris will voice the titular character. The series will be released on December 11, 2026.

==== Primetime specials ====
Television specials broadcast in prime time featuring Garfield
Title	Broadcast date	Emmy result
Here Comes Garfield	October 25, 1982	Nominated
Garfield on the Town	October 28, 1983	Won
Garfield in the Rough	October 26, 1984	Won
Garfield's Halloween Adventure	October 30, 1985	Won
Garfield in Paradise	May 27, 1986	Nominated
Garfield Goes Hollywood	May 8, 1987	Nominated
A Garfield Christmas	December 21, 1987	Nominated
Garfield: His 9 Lives	November 22, 1988	Nominated
Garfield's Babes and Bullets	May 23, 1989	Won
Garfield's Thanksgiving	November 22, 1989	Nominated
Garfield's Feline Fantasies	May 18, 1990	Nominated
Garfield Gets a Life	May 8, 1991	Nominated

=== Films ===
A live-action/computer animated film titled Garfield: The Movie was released in theaters on June 11, 2004, and a sequel titled Garfield: A Tail of Two Kitties was released on June 16, 2006. Both films were released by 20th Century Fox with actor Bill Murray voicing the character in both films. Despite receiving negative reviews from critics, the films were both commercial successes. Three direct-to-video films were released by Paws, Inc. in cooperation with Davis Entertainment: Garfield Gets Real on November 20, 2007, Garfield's Fun Fest on August 5, 2008, and Garfield's Pet Force on June 16, 2009.

On May 24, 2016, it was announced that Alcon Entertainment would develop a new CG-animated Garfield film, with John Cohen and Steven P. Wegner producing, and Mark Dindal directing the feature. In August 2019, Viacom acquired the rights to Garfield, leaving the status of the movie for the time uncertain, with Dindal confirming that the film was still in production in December 2020. On November 1, 2021, Chris Pratt was announced as the voice of Garfield, with animation being provided by DNEG, a production company of the film. David Reynolds was announced as the screenwriter of the film, reuniting him with Dindal after they worked together on The Emperor's New Groove. Sony Pictures will maintain global distribution rights for the film, apart from China. On May 24, 2022, Samuel L. Jackson joined the voice cast as Vic, Garfield's father. The movie was released on May 24, 2024, and was a success, bringing in a box office total of $255.4 million worldwide on a budget of $60 million. Pratt has been confirmed to return in the sequel, announced on July 8, 2025.

=== Video games ===
A Garfield video game was developed by Atari, Inc. for its Atari 2600 home video game system and appears in their 1984 catalog. However, after Atari's spinoff and sale of its home games and computers division, owner Jack Tramiel decided the character's royalties were too expensive given the declining state of the video game industry at the time, and the game was cancelled. A ROM image of the game was however released with Jim Davis' blessing.

Garfield: Big Fat Hairy Deal is a 1987 video game for the Atari ST, ZX Spectrum, Commodore 64, Amstrad CPC and the Amiga based on the comic strip. Towa Chiki made A Week of Garfield for the Family Computer, released only in Japan in 1989. Sega also made the 1995 video game Garfield: Caught in the Act for the Sega Genesis/Mega Drive, Game Gear and Windows 3.1 computers. Other companies made games, such as A Tale of Two Kitties for the DS, published by Game Factory, Garfield's Nightmare for DS, Garfield's Funfest for DS, and Garfield Labyrinth for Game Boy. On PlayStation 2 were Garfield and Garfield 2 (known in the US as Garfield, a Tale of Two Kitties). Garfield: Lasagna World Tour was also made for PS2. Garfield: Saving Arlene was only released in Japan and in the United Kingdom.

In 2012, a series of Garfield video games was launched by French publisher Anuman Interactive, including My Puzzles with Garfield!, Multiplication Tables with Garfield, Garfield Kart, Garfield Kart: Furious Racing, and Garfield's Match Up.

Garfield appears as a playable character in several Nickelodeon crossover games, including Nickelodeon All-Star Brawl, Nickelodeon Kart Racers 3: Slime Speedway, and Nickelodeon All-Star Brawl 2.

In 2026, the 3D action platforming game Garfield: Escape from Monday was released on Microsoft Windows, Nintendo Switch, PlayStation 5, and Xbox Series X/S. It received "Mixed or Average" reviews from critics in a Metacritic aggregate.

=== Stage ===
Joseph Papp, producer of A Chorus Line, discussed making a Garfield stage musical, but due to some complications, it never got off ground. A full-length stage musical, titled "Garfield Live", was planned to kick off its US tour in September 2010, but got moved to January 18, 2011, where it premiered in Muncie, Indiana. The book was written by Jim Davis, with music and lyrics by Michael Dansicker and Bill Meade, and it was booked by AWA Touring Services. The opening song, "Cattitude", can be heard on the national tour's website, along with two more, "On the Fence" and "Going Home!". When the North American tour concluded in 2012, it toured throughout Asia.

=== Comic book ===
In agreement with Paws, Boom! Studios launched in May 2012 a monthly Garfield comic book, with the first issue featuring a story written by Mark Evanier (who has supervised Garfield and Friends and The Garfield Show) and illustrated by Davis' long-time assistant Gary Barker.

=== Art book ===
In 2016, Hermes Press signed an agreement with Paws, Inc to publish an art book on the art of author Jim Davis, titled The Art of Jim Davis' Garfield. The book includes an essay by author R.C. Harvey and other original material, and was released in July 2016 for San Diego Comic-Con.

=== Restaurant ===
In 2018, a ghost restaurant themed after the franchise known as GarfieldEATS was opened in Dubai. Customers order food through the official mobile app, which also contains games and allows users to purchase episodes of Garfield and Friends. The restaurant serves lasagna, Garfield-shaped pizza, "Garfuccinos", and Garfield-shaped dark chocolate bars. A second location opened in Toronto in 2019. Due to the COVID-19 pandemic and a dispute over rent, the restaurant closed in 2020.

== Recurring subjects and themes ==
Many of the gags focus on Garfield's obsessive eating and obesity; his dislike of spiders; his hatred of Mondays, diets, and any form of exertion; his constant shedding (which annoys Jon); and his abuse of Odie and Jon as well as his obsession with mailing Nermal to Abu Dhabi, or simply throwing him through the front door. Though he will eat nearly anything (with the exception of raisins and spinach), Garfield is particularly fond of lasagna; he also enjoys eating Jon's houseplants and pet fish.

He also has odd relationships with household pests; Garfield generally spares mice, and even cooperates with them to cause mischief, but will readily swat or pound spiders flat. Other gags focus on Jon's poor social skills and inability to get a date; before he started dating Liz, he often tried to get dates, usually without success.

Garfield's world has specific locations that appear normally on the comic strips, like the vet's office or Irma's diner. Irma is a chirpy but slow-witted and unattractive waitress/manager, and one of Jon's few friends. The terrible food is the center of most of the jokes, along with the poor management. When Jon takes Liz on a date, Garfield occasionally tags along, though most trips also end up being embarrassing because Garfield will pig out or Jon will do something ridiculous.

Jon periodically visits his parents and brother on the farm. This results in week-long gags involving Jon and his family, such as Jon and his brother Doc Boy watching socks floating in the washing machine as if it were a television set.

On the farm, Jon's mother cooks huge dinners, which Garfield hugs her for. Jon has a grandmother who, in a strip, once kicked Odie; Garfield subsequently hugged her. Jon's parents have twice visited Jon, Garfield, and Odie in the city. Jon's father drove into town on his tractor and brought a rooster to wake him up.

Frequently, the characters break the fourth wall, mostly to explain something to the readers, talk about a subject that often sets up the strip's punchline, or glance at the reader when a character is belittled or not impressed. Sometimes, this theme revolves around the conventions of the strip; for example, in one strip, Garfield catches a cold and complains about it, noting that his thoughts are stuffed up.

=== Short storylines ===
Right panel of the October 27, 1989, strip

One storyline, which ran the week before Halloween in 1989, is unique among Garfield strips in that it is not meant to be humorous. It depicts Garfield awakening in a future in which the house is abandoned and he no longer exists. In Garfield's Twentieth Anniversary Collection, in which the strips are reprinted, Jim Davis discusses the genesis for this series:

During a writing session for Halloween, I got the idea for this decidedly different series of strips. I wanted to scare people. And what do people fear most? Why, being alone. We carried out the concept to its logical conclusion and got a lot of responses from readers. Reaction ranged from 'Right on!' to 'This isn't a trend, is it?

One of the recurring storylines involves Garfield getting lost or running away. The longest one of these lasted for over a month (in 1986, from August 25 to September 28); it began with Jon telling Garfield to go get the newspaper. Garfield walks outside to get it, but speculates about what will happen if he wanders off – and decides to find out. Jon notices Garfield has been gone too long, so he sends Odie out to find him. He quickly realizes his mistake, and Odie, being not too bright, also gets lost. Jon starts to get lonely, so he offers a reward for the return of Garfield and Odie. He is not descriptive, so animals including an elephant, monkeys, a seal, a snake, a kangaroo and joey, and turtles are brought to Jon's house for the reward. After a series of events, including Odie being adopted by a small girl, both pets meeting up at a circus that they briefly join, and both going to a pet shop, Garfield and Odie make it back home.

Another story involved Jon going away on a business trip around Christmas time, leaving Garfield a week's worth of food, which he devoured instantly. Garfield then leaves the house and gets locked out. He then reunites with his mother, and eventually makes it back home in the snow on Christmas Eve (December 3–23, 1984). Part of this storyline was taken from the 1983 Emmy-winning special Garfield on the Town.

== Paws, Inc. ==
Paws, Inc. was founded in 1981 by Jim Davis to support the Garfield comic strip and its licensing. It is located in Muncie, Indiana, and has a staff of nearly 50 artists and licensing administrators. In 1994, the company purchased all rights to the Garfield comic strips from 1978 to 1993 from United Feature Syndicate. However, the original black and white daily strips and original color Sunday strips remain copyrighted to United Feature Syndicate. The full-color daily strips and recolored Sunday strips are copyrighted to Paws as they are considered a different product. Though rights to the strip remain with Paws, Inc., it is currently distributed by the Andrews McMeel Syndication. In August 2019, Davis sold Paws, Inc. to Viacom, who has placed Garfield under the Nickelodeon banner.

== See also ==
- Heathcliff – another American comic strip featuring an orange cat

== Bibliography ==
=== Primary sources ===
- Davis, Jim (1998). 20 Years & Still Kicking!: Garfield's Twentieth Anniversary Collection. New York: Ballantine Books. ISBN 978-0-345-42126-5.
- Davis, Jim (2004). In Dog Years I'd be Dead: Garfield at 25. Random House. ISBN 978-0-345-45204-7.

=== Secondary sources ===
- Choron, Sandra; Choron, Harry; Moore, Arden (2007). Planet Cat: A Cat-alog. Houghton Mifflin Harcourt. ISBN 978-0-618-81259-2.
- Lang, J. Stephen (2004). 1,001 Things You Always Wanted to Know about Cats. Wiley. ISBN 978-0-7645-6926-5.
- Hoffmann, Frank W.; Bailey, William G. (1994). Fashion & Merchandising Fads. Haworth Press. ISBN 978-1-56023-031-1.
- Hurd, Jud (2004). Cartoon Success Secrets: A Tribute to 30 Years of Cartoonist Profiles. Andrews McMeel Publishing. ISBN 978-0-7407-3809-8.
- Inde, Vilis R. (1998). Art in the Courtroom: Piracy or Fair Use?. Greenwood Publishing Group. ISBN 978-0-275-95971-5.
- Mansour, David (2005). From Abba to Zoom: A Pop Culture Encyclopedia of the Late 20th Century. Andrews McMeel Publishing. ISBN 978-0-7407-5118-9.
- Price, Nelson (1997). Indiana Legends: Famous Hoosiers from Johnny Appleseed to David Letterman. Emmis Books. ISBN 978-1-57860-006-9.
- Rogers, Katharine M. (2001). The Cat and the Human Imagination: Feline Images from Bast to Garfield. University of Michigan Press. ISBN 978-0-472-08750-1.
- Thomas, Phyllis (2007). Indiana: Off the Beaten Path: A Guide to Unique Places. Globe Pequot Press. ISBN 978-0-7627-4414-5.
