= Jon Arbuckle =

Garfield character

- Garfield character
- First appearance: January 8, 1976 in Jon
- Created by: Jim Davis
- Portrayed by: Breckin Meyer (live-action/CGI 2004–06)
- Voiced by: Thom Huge (1980–2001); Sandy Kenyon (1982); Jon Barnard (2004, 2009, 2021); Wally Wingert (2007–2015); Bruno Choël (2019–2020); Nicholas Hoult (2024); Damien Laquet (2025); David Gasman (2026); Joe Brogie (2026–present)

In-universe information
- Full name: Jonathan Q. Arbuckle
- Occupation: Cartoonist
- Family: Garfield (pet cat), Odie (pet dog)
- Significant other: Liz Wilson (girlfriend)
- Relatives: Doc Boy (brother), Berferd (cousin), George (cousin), Tony Arbuckle, Long John Arbuckle, Judy (cousin), Tammy (niece), Stevie (nephew), Ned (uncle), Roy (uncle), Bill (uncle), Ed (uncle), Orpha (aunt), Edna (aunt), Trudy (aunt), Zelda (aunt), an unnamed great-great-grandmother
- Nationality: American
- Birthday: July 28, 1950 and mentions of the birthday, but not fully confirmed:

Jonathan Q. "Jon" Arbuckle is a character from the Garfield comic strip by Jim Davis. He also appears in the animated television series Garfield and Friends and The Garfield Show, two live-action/animated feature films, and four fully animated films.

Jon is the owner of Garfield, whom he is frequently yet unknowingly mocked by, and Odie. A cartoonist by trade, he is largely presented as a comical, bumbling geek who is socially oblivious, especially when it comes to women.

== Development ==
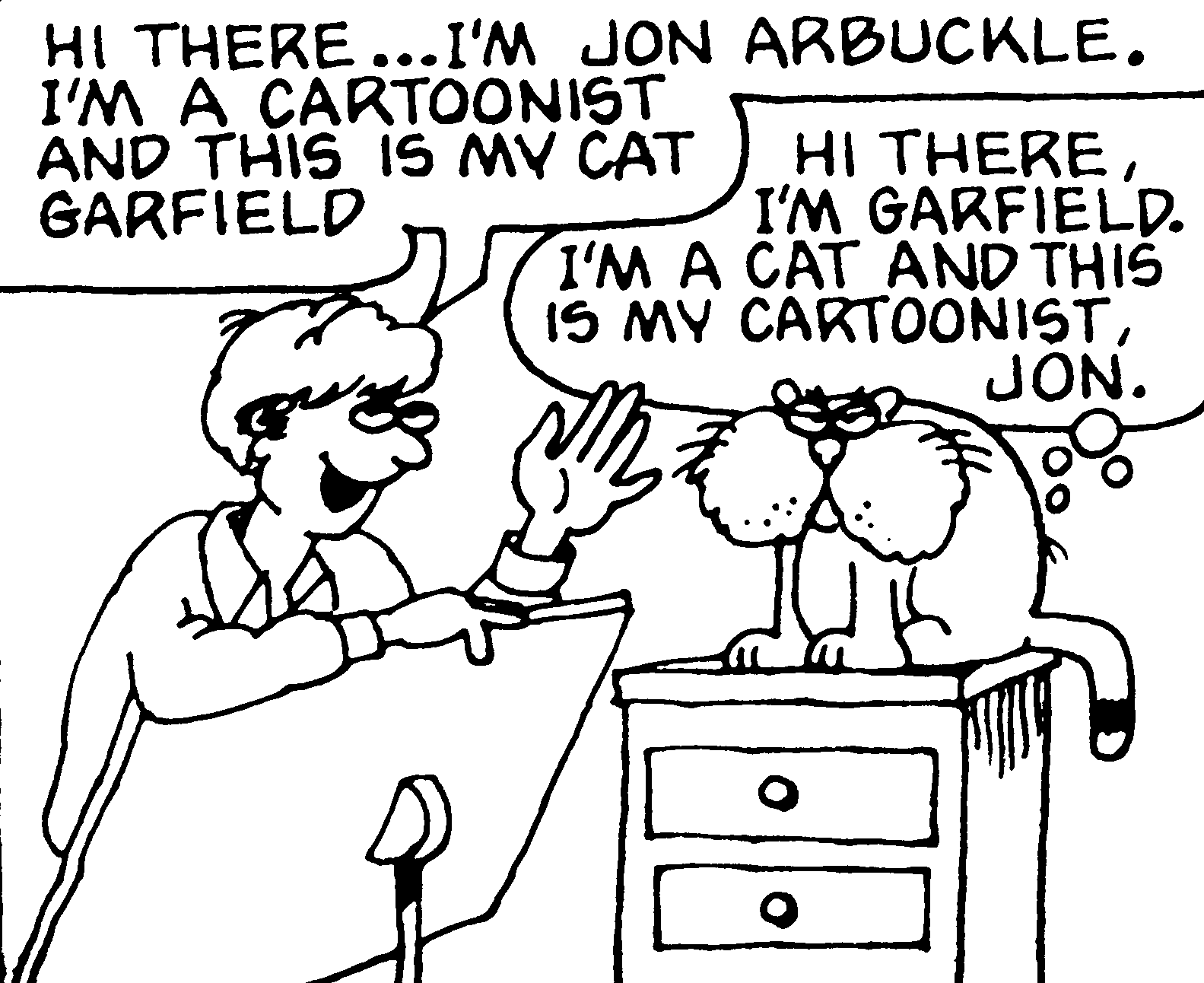
Jon Arbuckle's first appearance in Jon

The character of Jon Arbuckle was envisioned by Jim Davis as an author surrogate and was the primary character of the comic strip Jon, created by Davis in 1976 and syndicated locally in the Indiana newspaper The Pendleton Times. Jon featured Jon Arbuckle alongside his pet cat, Garfield, roommate Lyman and Lyman's dog "Spot", who would eventually evolve into Odie. Davis eventually decided to refocus the strip on Garfield, with the renamed Garfield strip achieving national syndication in 1978. The Jon comics were published without copyright notices, making them and the prototypical Jon and Garfield characters public domain under pre-1977 copyright law.

The character's name was taken from businessman John Arbuckle, who Davis had heard mentioned in a commercial for Yuban Instant Coffee.

== Fictional biography ==
Jonathan Q. "Jon" Arbuckle is an American cartoonist who is the owner of Garfield and Odie. His exact age is unknown. Jon's age was given as 29 years old in a December 23, 1980, strip when he tells Garfield a joke that he "would be 30 but he was sick a year" (although given that this is presented in the context of Jon telling a joke, it is possible Jon may not have stated his actual age). In the episode "T3000" of The Garfield Show, he is described as 22.

He and his pets live in Jim Davis's hometown of Muncie, Indiana, according to the television specials Garfield Goes Hollywood and Happy Birthday, Garfield.

=== Occupation and hobbies ===
In the first strip, Jon is presented as a cartoonist. Garfield and Friends also shows him several times as a cartoonist. In The Garfield Show, his occupation is a cartoonist. Also, in the strip from May 2, 2010, Liz tells her parents Jon is a cartoonist. Jon was also seen doing his work briefly in the August 2, 2015, strip.

He can play the accordion, bagpipes, guitar, banjo, and bongos and sing, although his musical skills are not the greatest.

=== Family ===
Jon was raised on a farm and occasionally visits his mother, father, paternal grandmother, and brother Doc Boy, who live on the farm, usually at Christmas time.

Jon lives with cat Garfield and dog Odie, his pets. He acquired his cat at a pet shop. Jon acquired Odie later, when Lyman, an old friend of his (and Odie's original owner), moved in with him and Garfield. After a few years, Lyman disappeared from the strip, never to be heard from again. The book Twenty Years and Still Kicking, which marked Garfield's twentieth year, included parodies of how Lyman left, such as "Had lunch with Jimmy Hoffa and then...". Lyman does appear in an episode of The Garfield Show, during which Jon sets out to look for him. Odie goes back to Lyman but returns to Garfield at the end.

=== Personality ===
Jon is often presented as being very odd and off-putting to others, particularly many of the women he would date or attempt to date before his relationship with Liz began. Jon's off-putting nature is the result of a wide number of factors, but common reasons for it include his ridiculous pick-up lines, his over-the-top and off-putting fashion sense, weird habits, and annoying character and personality. A recurring gag at a certain point in the comics was Jon and Garfield attending New Year's gatherings only for Garfield to wind up charming the other attendees while Jon would often be shunned and forced to return home. While lacking social skills, Jon is not socially introverted, rather it is because of how over-the-top and extroverted he is that often lands him in trouble with others. Garfield often mocks him for these blunders.

Contrasting his more bizarre moments and tendencies, Jon is also frequently portrayed as the straight man in certain instances, typically to situations regarding his pets' antics. Jon also had a habit of dating women stranger than even himself. Notable examples include Kimmy, a woman raised by wolves who only returned to human civilization the previous Friday before their date, a woman who tried to run Jon over with her truck (although Jon survived this as, in his words, "fortunately 18-wheelers aren't very maneuverable"), Suki, a "sumo belly dancer", and Siamese Triplets Gertie, Gretta, and Bob.

Since 2006, Jon has been in a relationship with Garfield's veterinarian, Dr. Liz Wilson. Although she has a deadpan, sardonic persona, she finds Jon's outlandish and goofball behavior endearing on occasion. Before they began dating, Jon often attempted to pursue Liz romantically, at worst (and in most cases) comically failing in his attempts to do so and at best getting her to go out with him once but ultimately failing to get Liz to continue the relationship beyond an initial date; however, in an extended story arc from June 20 to July 29, 2006, Liz finally admitted she was in love with him and the two have remained in a relationship since. As early as 1982, Davis had suggested he would eventually bring Jon and Liz together as a couple.

Despite his wimpy nature, Jon can be assertive, particularly when it comes to dealing with Garfield (and occasionally Odie) and the latter's antics (sometimes to a fault). Jon has also shown instances of matching and sometimes surpassing Garfield's cruel and annoying tendencies and can be selfish, petty, and childish when dealing with others like Garfield and his brother Doc Boy, with the two often resorting to acting like children in the presence of the other.

== Characterization ==
Many of Jon's character traits are shared with his author Jim Davis, who is likewise a cartoonist, raised on a farm and born on July 28. He recalled that the television special A Garfield Christmas was, with the exception of having Jon's grandmother present, an accurate representation of Davis family Christmases.

== Reception ==
Jon Arbuckle was voted number one on the Best Week Ever blog's list of "The Most Depressed Comic Book Characters".

== Other media ==
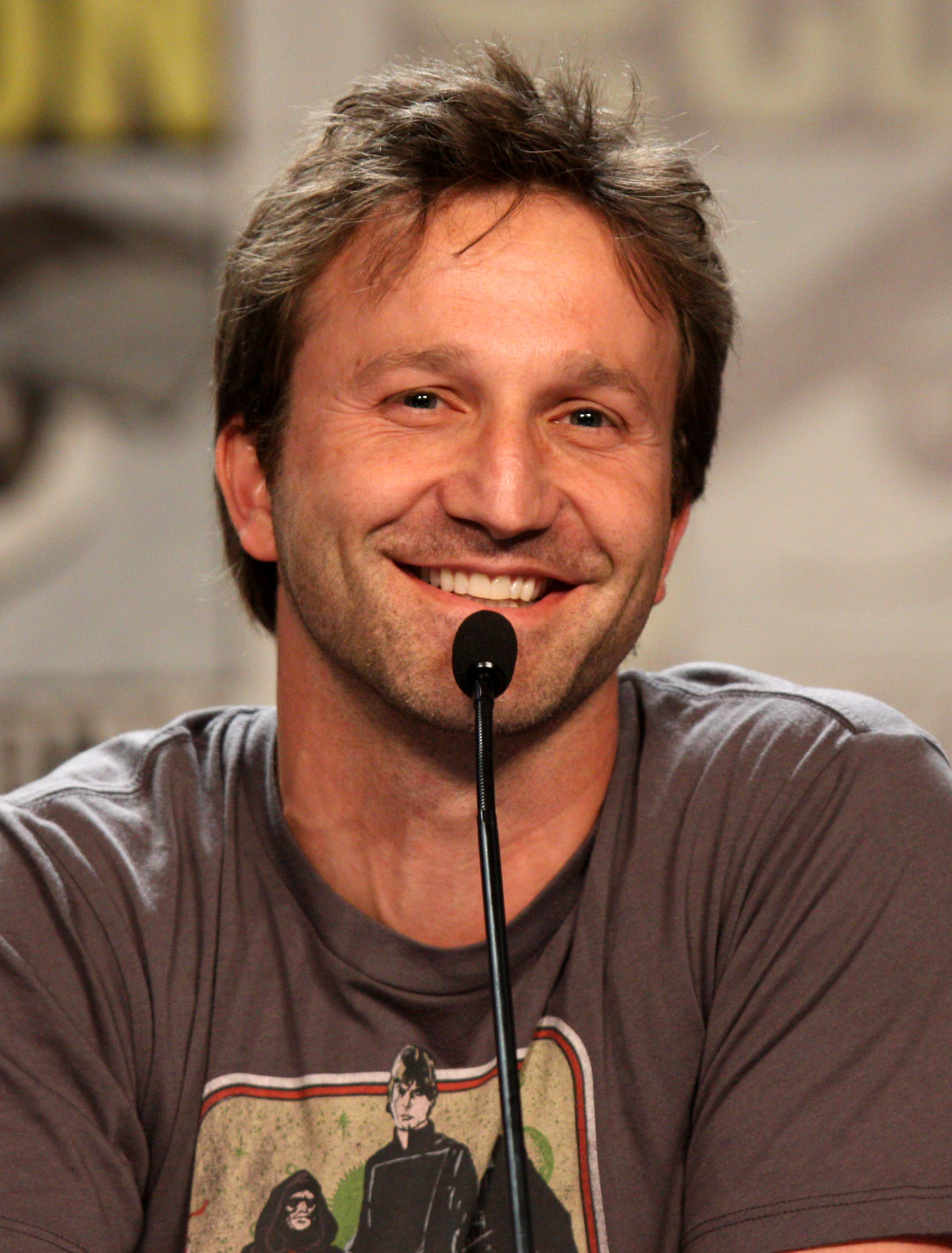
Breckin Meyer portrays Jon Arbuckle in the live-action film adaptations.

- Jon's first animated appearance was in the 1980 CBS special, The Fantastic Funnies, when he was voiced by Thom Huge. Jon was voiced by Sandy Kenyon in the first animated television special (Here Comes Garfield), before Huge returned to the character in all later specials and in Garfield and Friends. Breckin Meyer portrayed Jon in the live-action/animated films Garfield: The Movie and Garfield: A Tail of Two Kitties. Jim Carrey was up to play him, but dropped out. In Garfield Gets Real, Garfield's Fun Fest and Garfield's Pet Force, he was voiced by Wally Wingert. Wingert also provides Jon's voice for The Garfield Show. Nicholas Hoult voiced Jon in The Garfield Movie.
- Garfield Minus Garfield removes all the other characters completely and simply features Jon talking to himself. Fans connected with Jon's "loneliness and desperation" and found his "crazy antics" humorous; Jim Davis himself called Dan Walsh's (the author of Garfield Minus Garfield) strips an "inspired thing to do" and said that "some of the strips work better than the originals".
