= Running gag =

Literary device

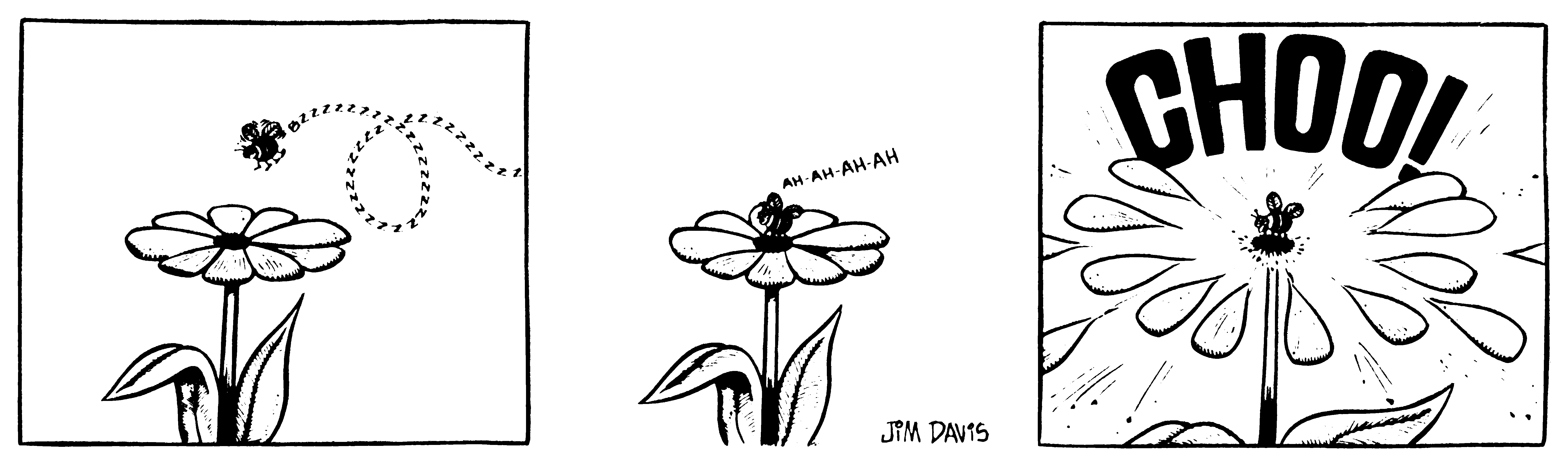
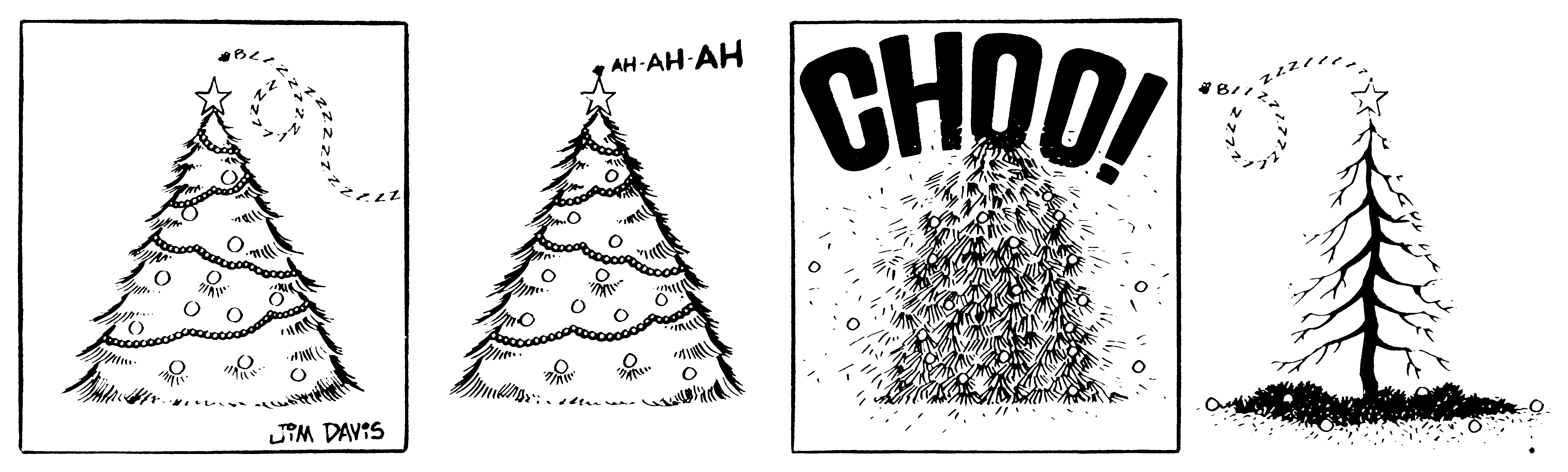

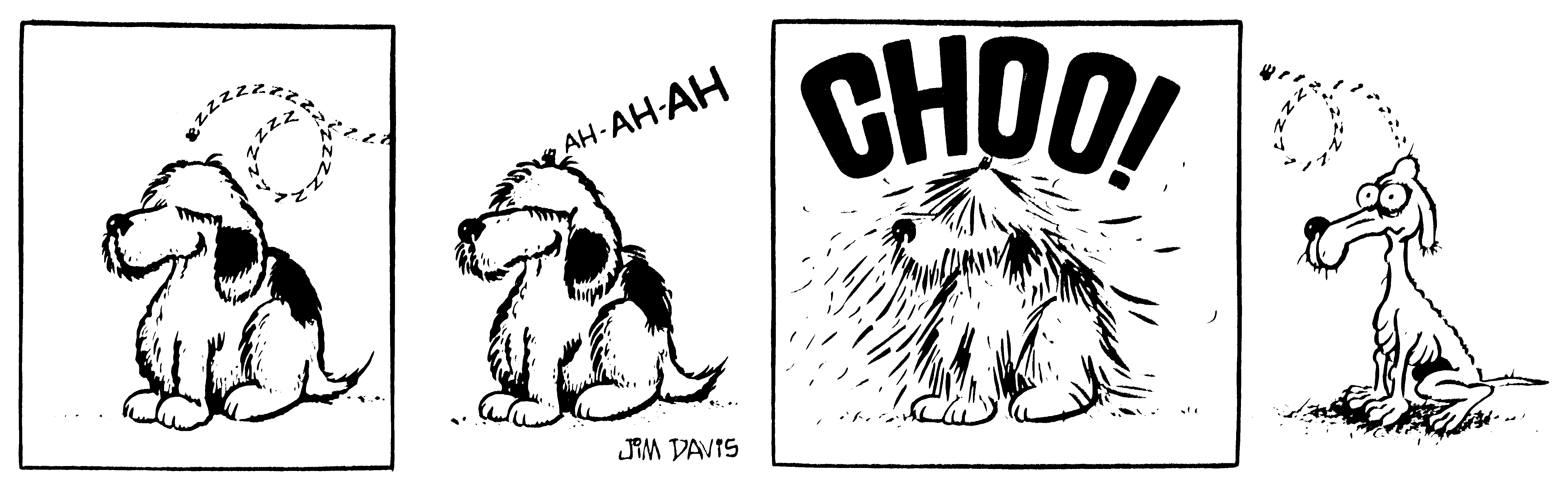
A running gag across three Gnorm Gnat comic strips, printed several weeks apart, where a bee lands on large objects and sneezes hard enough to damage them

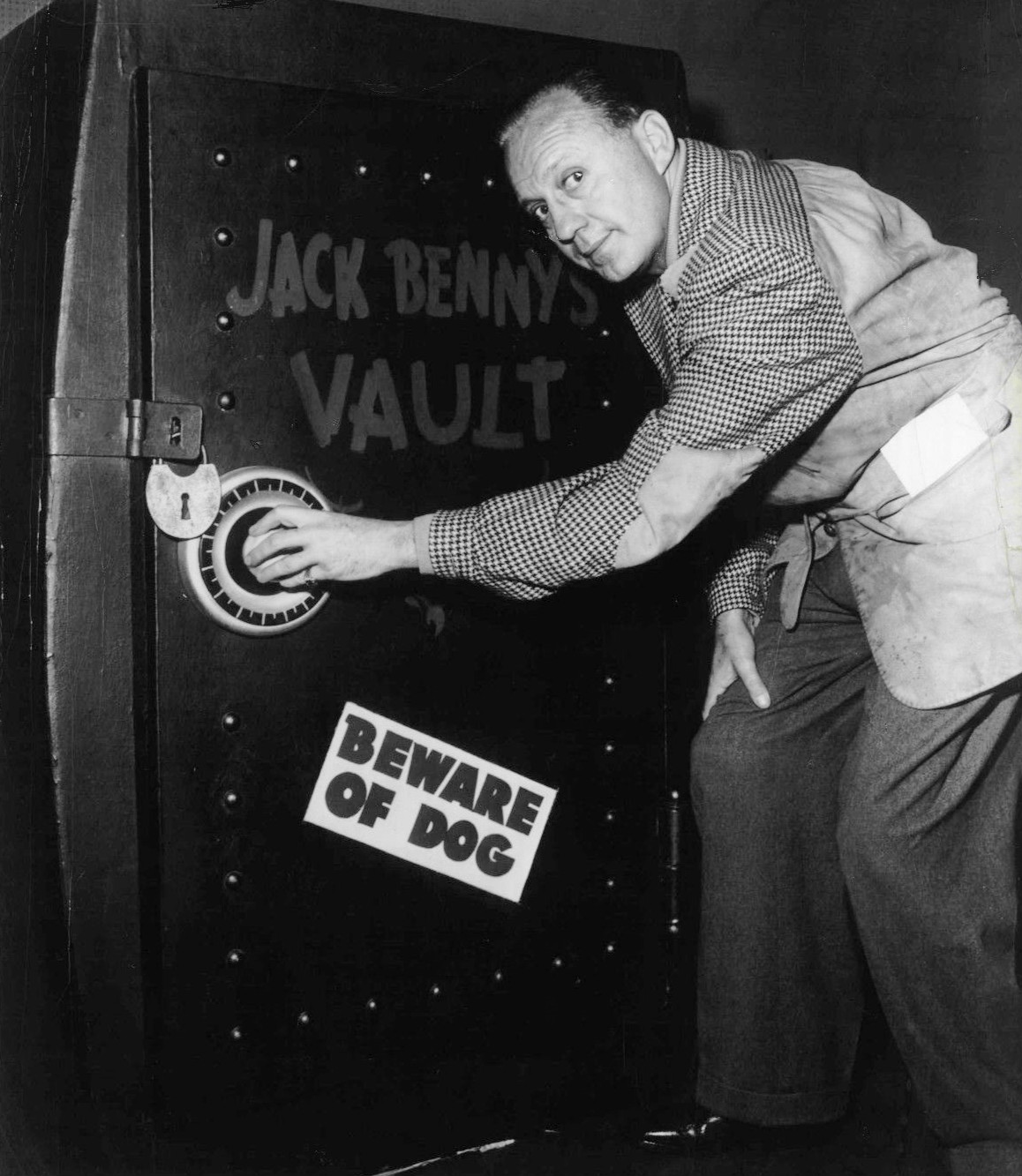
A running gag in The Jack Benny Program radio show was that Benny owned a high-security vault in his basement, which would produce dramatic sound effects when broken into.

A running gag, or running joke, is a literary device that takes the form of an amusing joke or a comical reference and appears repeatedly throughout a work of literature or other form of storytelling. Though they are related, catchphrases are not considered to be running gags.

Running gags can begin with an instance of unintentional humor or a one-time joke that provokes a strong response, and is repeated in variations as the joke grows familiar and audiences anticipate reappearances of the gag. The humor in a running gag may derive entirely from how often it is repeated, but the underlying statement or situation will always be some form of joke. A trivial statement will not become a running gag simply by being repeated. A running gag may also derive its humor from the (in)appropriateness of the situation in which it occurs, or by setting up the audience to expect another occurrence of the joke and then substituting something else (bait and switch). Running gags are found in everyday life, live theater, live comedy, television shows, video games, films, books, comic strips, and potentially any other situation in which humor is possible and there is enough time for the repetitions to happen.

A running gag can be verbal or visual and may "convey social values by echoing belligerent speakers with a barrage of caricatured threats". For example, a character may present others with a proposition that is so ridiculous or outrageous it is likely to be self-mocking to the point where the original request has little or no chance of actually being carried out and results in a humorous effect.

== See also ==
- Callback (comedy) – Form of joke
- Catchphrase – Phrase or expression recognized by its repeated utterance
- Gimmick – Novel device or idea designed to attract attention
- In-joke – Humour only specific people understand
- Recurring character – Role in fiction
- Trademark look – Well-recognized fashion or posture choice
