= Garfield (character) =

Fictional cat and Garfield protagonist

Publication information
- Publisher: Paws, Inc. (Skydance Corporation)
- First appearance: January 8, 1976 in Jon
- Created by: Jim Davis
- Voiced by: Scott Beach (1980); Lorenzo Music (1982–2001); Tom Smothers (1991); Bill Murray (2004–2006); Jeff Bergman (2004); Jon Barnard (2004–2021); Frank Welker (2007–present); David Gasman (2008); Gérard Surugue (2019–2020); Chris Pratt (2024–present); Damien Laquet (2025); David Coburn (2026); Lamorne Morris (2026–present)

In-story information
- Species: Cat
- Partnerships: Arlene (girlfriend)
- Supporting character of: Jon Arbuckle (owner); Sonja (mother); Vic (father); Raoul (half-brother); Odie (family pet dog)

Garfield is a fictional cat and the protagonist of the comic strip of the same name, created by Jim Davis. Garfield is portrayed as a lazy, fat, cynical and self-absorbed orange tabby cat. He is noted for his love of lasagna, pizza, coffee, and sleeping, and his hatred of Mondays, Nermal, the vet, and exercise.

== Character ==
=== Fictional biography ===
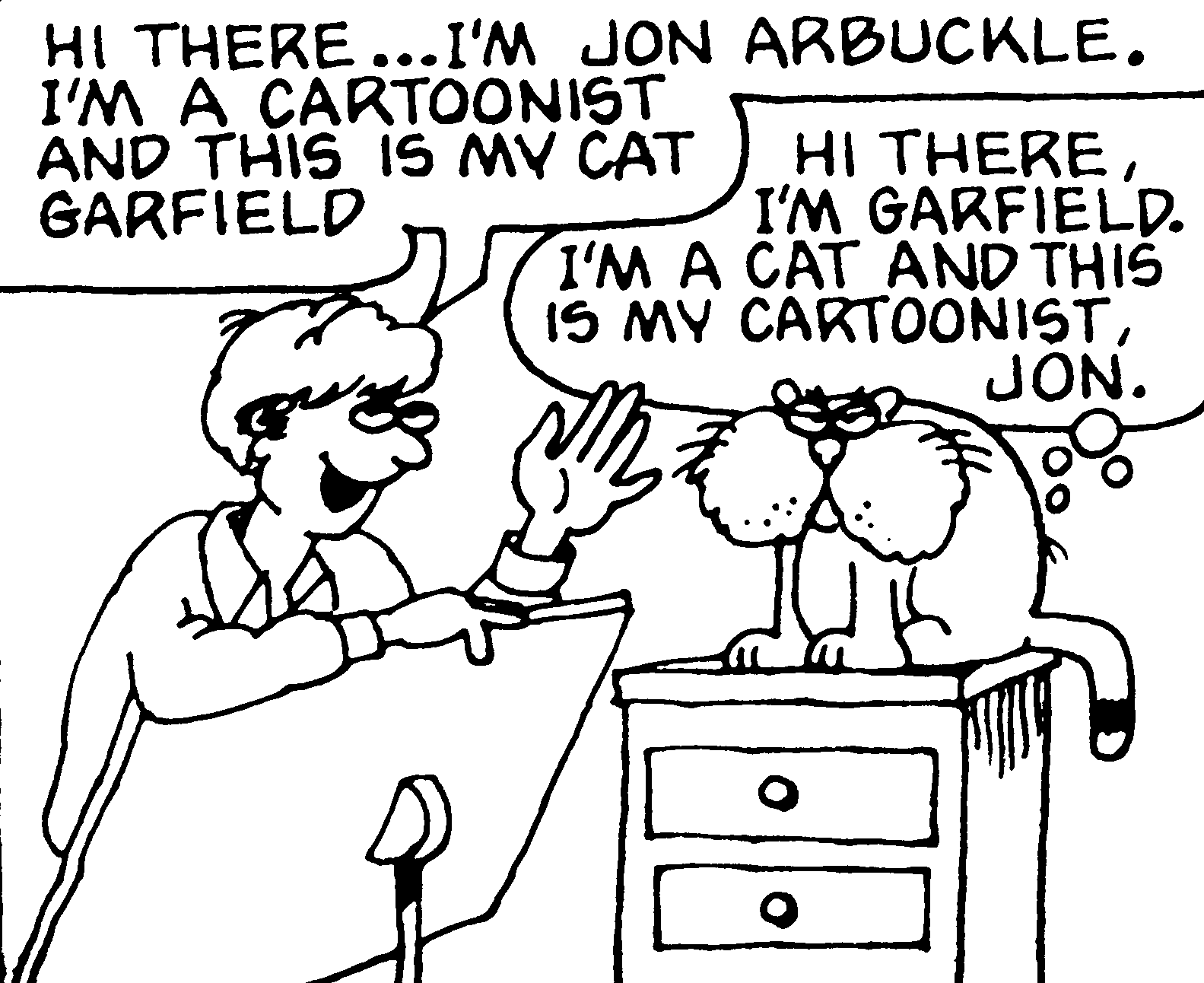
Garfield in his first appearance in 1976, on the strip Jon

Garfield in 1980, as portrayed on the back cover of Garfield at Large

Garfield is a black and orange tabby cat belonging to Jon Arbuckle. He was born on June 19, 1978 (the day the first Garfield strip was published), in the kitchen of Mamma Leoni's Italian Restaurant. Jim Davis named Garfield after his grandfather, James Garfield Davis. As a kitten, Garfield develops a taste for lasagna, describing it as "Nature's most perfect food". Because of his large appetite, the owner of Mamma Leoni's has to choose between giving away Garfield or closing down his restaurant; so Garfield is sold to a pet shop. Garfield is adopted from the store by Jon Arbuckle on August 19, 1978.

Garfield frequently gets into many adventures, such as getting stuck in roll-up shades, sparring with mice, and getting locked up in animal shelters.

It is also given that Garfield uses the "sandbox" on occasion, such as in one 1978 strip; he says he hates commercials because they are "too long to sit through and too short for a trip to the sandbox". It was revealed on October 27, 1979, that he does not like raisins.

On Garfield's 25th anniversary in 2003, several strips were featured in which he interacted with his 1978 version. In 2005, Garfield and Jon appeared in several comic strips of Blondie in honor of their 75th anniversary. There was an earlier Blondie crossover on the Garfield strip published April 1, 1997, and vice versa, as part of the comic strip switcheroo.

=== Character traits ===
Among Garfield's character traits are laziness, cynicism, sarcasm, hatred of Mondays and fellow cat Nermal, and love of food, particularly lasagna. He also has a tendency to be annoyed by Jon's dog Odie. Garfield rarely, if ever, speaks in the strip; his ideas and opinions are instead conveyed to the reader in thought bubbles; Jim Davis has stated that within the universe of the comic strip humans are unable to understand Garfield's "speech".

Garfield's physical appearance has evolved over time. Originally, Garfield had an obese physique with small facial features that required him to stand on all four legs, which caused difficulties when the character was adapted to television and made it more difficult to animate Garfield dancing; Davis credited Charles M. Schulz with redesigning Garfield so that he could stand on his hind legs. Further transformations came in response to shrinkage on newspaper comics pages, as Davis increased the size of Garfield's features (especially his eyes) so that the strip could be printed at smaller sizes without gags becoming too small to see.

=== Gender ===
In February 2017, a dispute arose on the talk page of the character's Wikipedia page as to the character's gender. Although other characters have persistently referred to Garfield with male pronouns, owing to comments that the character's creator, Jim Davis, made in 2014 to Mental Floss, in which he said, "Garfield is very universal. By virtue of being a cat, really, he's not really male or female or any particular race or nationality, young or old. It gives me a lot more latitude for the humor for the situations." Davis explained that although Garfield is neither male nor female, he does use male pronouns. However, Davis later clarified that Garfield is, in fact, male.

== Voice-over timeline ==
- Scott Beach (1980; segment on The Fantastic Funnies)
- Lorenzo Music (1982–2001; TV specials, Garfield and Friends, Garfield’s Mad About Cats)
- Lou Rawls (1982–1991, occasional singing voice, TV specials)
- Tom Smothers (1991; Alpo commercials)
- Bill Murray (2004–2006; Garfield: The Movie, Garfield: A Tail of Two Kitties)
- Jeff Bergman (2004; Boomerang UK bumper)
- Jon Barnard (2004–2021; Garfield's Nightmare, Garfield, Garfield: Saving Arlene, Garfield: Lasagna World Tour, Garfield Gets Real, The Garfield Show: Threat of the Space Lasagna, singing voice in The Garfield Show (season 4), Garfield Cat Litter commercial, Garfield Pinball)
- Frank Welker (2007–present; Garfield Gets Real, Garfield's Fun Fest, Garfield's Pet Force, The Garfield Show, Mad, Nickelodeon All-Star Brawl, Nickelodeon Extreme Tennis, Nickelodeon Kart Racers 3: Slime Speedway, Nickelodeon All-Star Brawl 2)
- David Gasman (2008; The Garfield Show pilot)
- Gérard Surugue (2019–2020; Garfield Originals)
- Chris Pratt (2024–present; The Garfield Movie)
- Damien Laquet (2025; Garfield Kart 2 - All You Can Drift)
- David Coburn (2026; Garfield: Escape from Monday)
- Lamorne Morris (2026–present; Garfield)

Voices in unofficial material:

- Fred Tatasciore (2006; Robot Chicken)
- Seth Green (2011–2012; Robot Chicken)
- Kevin Shinick (2011–2012; Mad)
- Dan Castellaneta (2017; The Simpsons)
- Dan Milano (2020; Robot Chicken)

== Other media ==
Garfield's computer animated design from the two live-action films, as seen in Garfield: A Tail of Two Kitties

Garfield has been a mascot of Kennywood, a traditional amusement park in West Mifflin, Pennsylvania, near Pittsburgh since the 1990s. A ride at Kennywood, "Garfield's Nightmare", was created with the exclusive input of Garfield creator, Jim Davis.

In the first two Garfield films, Garfield: The Movie and Garfield: A Tail of Two Kitties, Garfield was created using computer animation, though the movies were otherwise primarily live-action. In these films, Garfield was voiced by Bill Murray.
