= Garfield at Large =

1980 book by Jim Davis

- Garfield at Large, 1980 edition.
- Author: Jim Davis
- Language: English
- Subject: Comics
- Genre: Humor, Slapstick
- Publisher: Ballantine Books (USA)
- Publication date: February 21, 1980
- Publication place: United States
- Media type: Trade paperback
- Followed by: Garfield Gains Weight

Garfield at Large is the first compilation book of panels from the comic strip Garfield. The book was originally published by Ballantine Books in the United States in 1980 and the strips date from June 19, 1978, to January 22, 1979.

== History ==
Prior to its publication, comic strip compilations were most commonly formatted like a standard paperback book with the panels running down the page. Jim Davis, Garfield's author, disliked the idea and convinced Ballantine to print the strips from left to right, as they would have appeared in the newspaper. This resulted in the final product being shorter from top to bottom and much wider from side to side than the average paperback book. This layout became known in the publishing industry as the "Garfield format", and was later adapted by other book publishers as well. Davis noted that such a format became popular for comic strip compilations, such as those of The Far Side. The book was number one on The New York Times bestseller list for almost two years.

In the original editions, the strips were published in black and white, including the Sunday strips, which appeared in color originally in their newspaper format. Garfield at Large has since been republished in full color in 2001 as part of the "Garfield Classics" series and as part of a “Fat Cat 3-Pack” (pack containing the first three books for a discounted price) in 1993 and 2001, the latter with its strips in full color. The colorized editions correct an error present in all previous editions: the July 23, 1978 strip originally had the first panel (Garfield hopping down the stairs) printed as the fourth panel.

The reissued, colorized 2001 edition of Garfield at Large.
