= Quinton Reviews =

American YouTuber (born 1996)

Quinton Kyle Hoover
- Born: December 7, 1996 (age 29)
- Occupation: YouTuber

YouTube information
- Channels: Quinton Reviews; Quinton Re2s
- Years active: 2013–present
- Subscribers: 916 thousand (Quinton Reviews); 61 thousand (Quinton Re2s)
- Views: 154.8 million (Quinton Reviews); 3.2 million (Quinton Re2s)
- Last updated: April 16, 2025

Quinton Kyle Hoover (born December 7, 1996), known online primarily as Quinton Reviews, is an American YouTuber. Hoover produces video essays on various topics, usually pop culture. His best-known work includes his coverage of the Garfield franchise and a series of hours-long videos covering iCarly and its spin-offs.

== YouTube career ==
Hoover began his career as a content creator in 2013, initially creating sketches and videos discussing TV shows; his first two videos spanned one minute and 48 seconds and nine seconds, respectively. In 2017, he uploaded a SpongeBob SquarePants video analyzing the show's role in predicting meme culture, focusing on the "Ripped Pants" episode. From 2019 to 2020, Hoover published two videos detailing his discovery of archived copies of Jim Davis's past work Jon, a precursor to Garfield. Hoover traveled to Muncie, Indiana, in order to get scans of the historical strips, and published a video about his trip on the channel.

Hoover garnered popularity through his lengthy videos discussing and analyzing Nickelodeon sitcoms. In June 2021, Hoover published a five-hour video called "iBinged iCarly", with a recap of the series with his own commentary. He also published a video with a discussion on the career and works of YouTuber Lucas Cruikshank, who starred in an episode of iCarly, and a series of further videos on iCarly and its related series Victorious and Sam & Cat. Hoover's video essays – which he referred to as "breakdowns" – were credited among other content creators with ushering a trend of long-form essay content, and have accumulated several million views. Lifehacker included Hoover's Victorious essay in a 2022 list of ten niche YouTube video essays.

In April 2024, as a late April Fools' joke, he posted a 38-hour recap video of The Beverly Hillbillies hosted by his father, Russ, who had experienced a serious car accident prior to recording the video. A week after it was published, CBS issued a copyright claim on the video, and on April 11, Paramount Global Content Protection sent an email to Hoover disagreeing that the video qualified as fair use, leading Hoover to take the video down to avoid risking a lawsuit. The video was re-edited with four hours of extra content and the copyrighted material edited out in time for April Fools' Day 2025.
