= Garfield merchandise =

Products of Garfield comic strip

Garfield merchandise is the merchandise based on the "Garfield" comic strip by Jim Davis. Garfield is one of the world's most prominent and widely syndicated comic strips, and was specifically designed to be marketable. Before the sale of Paws, Inc. in August 2019, all the profits from merchandise went to Paws, Inc., of which Jim Davis is the CEO and founder. The following is a compiled list of selected merchandise based on the franchise.

== Books ==
=== Compilations ===
Since 1980, Ballantine Books has published compilations containing reprints of Garfield comic strips as they appeared in newspapers. These books were originally printed in black and white, but Volumes 37 and beyond, as well as reissues of earlier volumes, have been in full color. Each book collects approximately six months of comics, including the Sunday comics (which were in black and white prior to Volume 37).

The titles of these books were styled as double entendres alluding to Garfield’s weight. A special edition of a compilation noted rejected book titles throughout the series. These books introduced the "Garfield format" in publishing, whereby the rectangular books are horizontally oriented to match the comic strip dimensions. Davis has recalled having to invent the format to better fit the books on the store shelves. Volumes 37 and beyond introduced a new, larger, square book in full color, showing the Sunday strips to be formatted in their original size as opposed to the smaller book size. This means that the first panel after the logo box (called the drop panel, or throwaway gag) is no longer printed in the compilation books, but are preserved still on the eBook editions.

Each of the original 36 books have been re-released in the new larger format, dubbed "Garfield Classics".

Title	Comics Years	Release date
Garfield At Large: His First Book	June 19, 1978 – January 22, 1979	September 16, 1980
Garfield Gains Weight: His Second Book	January 23, 1979 – August 26, 1979	March 25, 1981
Garfield Bigger Than Life: His Third Book	August 27, 1979 – March 30, 1980	September 8, 1981
Garfield Weighs In: His Fourth Book	March 31, 1980 – November 2, 1980	March 15, 1982
Garfield Takes the Cake: His Fifth Book	November 3, 1980 – June 7, 1981	June 16, 1982
Garfield Eats His Heart Out: His Sixth Book	June 8, 1981 – January 10, 1982	February 12, 1983
Garfield Sits Around the House: His Seventh Book	January 11, 1982 – August 15, 1982	March 10, 1983
Garfield Tips the Scales: His Eighth Book	August 16, 1982 – March 20, 1983	February 12, 1984
Garfield Loses His Feet: His Ninth Book	March 21, 1983 – October 23, 1983	September 12, 1984
Garfield Makes It Big: His 10th Book	October 24, 1983 – May 27, 1984	February 12, 1985
Garfield Rolls On: His 11th Book	May 28, 1984 – December 30, 1984	September 12, 1985
Garfield Out to Lunch: His 12th Book	December 31, 1984 – August 4, 1985	February 12, 1986
Garfield Food for Thought: His 13th Book	August 5, 1985 – March 9, 1986	February 12, 1987
Garfield Swallows His Pride: His 14th Book	March 10, 1986 – October 12, 1986	September 12, 1987
Garfield Worldwide: His 15th Book	October 13, 1986 – May 17, 1987	February 12, 1988
Garfield Rounds Out: His 16th Book	May 18, 1987 – December 19, 1987	September 12, 1988
Garfield Chews the Fat: His 17th Book	December 20, 1987 – July 23, 1988	February 18, 1989
Garfield Goes to Waist: His 18th Book	July 24, 1988 – February 25, 1989	February 24, 1990
Garfield Hangs Out: His 19th Book	February 26, 1989 – September 30, 1989	October 3, 1990
Garfield Takes Up Space: His 20th Book	October 1, 1989 – May 5, 1990	February 13, 1991
Garfield Says a Mouthful: His 21st Book	May 6, 1990 – December 4, 1990	September 24, 1991
Garfield By the Pound: His 22nd Book	December 5, 1990 – July 7, 1991	February 25, 1992
Garfield Keeps His Chins Up: His 23rd Book	July 8, 1991 – February 4, 1992	September 8, 1992
Garfield Takes His Licks: His 24th Book	February 5, 1992 – September 5, 1992	February 10, 1993
Garfield Hits the Big Time: His 25th Book	September 6, 1992 – April 10, 1993	August 24, 1993
Garfield Pulls His Weight: His 26th Book	April 11, 1993 – November 9, 1993	September 20, 1994
Garfield Dishes It Out: His 27th Book	November 10, 1993 – June 11, 1994	February 14, 1995
Garfield Life in the Fat Lane: His 28th Book	June 12, 1994 – January 10, 1995	September 26, 1995
Garfield Tons of Fun: His 29th Book	January 11, 1995 – August 12, 1995	February 13, 1996
Garfield Bigger and Better: His 30th Book	August 13, 1995 – March 12, 1996	September 24, 1996
Garfield Hams It Up: His 31st Book	March 13, 1996 – October 12, 1996	March 11, 1997
Garfield Thinks Big: His 32nd Book	October 13, 1996 – May 13, 1997	October 7, 1997
Garfield Throws His Weight Around: His 33rd Book	May 14, 1997 – December 13, 1997	October 6, 1998
Garfield Life to the Fullest: His 34th Book	December 14, 1997 – July 14, 1998	February 22, 1999
Garfield Feeds the Kitty: His 35th Book	July 15, 1998 – February 13, 1999	August 31, 1999
Garfield Hogs the Spotlight: His 36th Book	February 14, 1999 – September 11, 1999	February 29, 2000
Garfield Beefs Up: His 37th Book	September 12, 1999 – April 8, 2000	October 3, 2000
Garfield Gets Cookin': His 38th Book	April 9, 2000 – November 6, 2000	October 2, 2001
Garfield Eats Crow: His 39th Book	November 5, 2000 – June 2, 2001	January 1, 2003
Garfield Survival of the Fattest: His 40th Book	June 3, 2001 – December 29, 2001	February 3, 2004
Garfield Older and Wider: His 41st Book	December 30, 2001 – July 27, 2002	January 25, 2005
Garfield Pigs Out: His 42nd Book	July 28, 2002 – February 22, 2003	February 7, 2006
Garfield Blots Out The Sun: His 43rd Book	February 23, 2003 – September 20, 2003	January 30, 2007
Garfield Goes Bananas: His 44th Book	September 21, 2003 – April 17, 2004	August 28, 2007
Garfield Large & In Charge: His 45th Book	April 18, 2004 – November 13, 2004	January 29, 2008
Garfield Spills the Beans: His 46th Book	November 14, 2004 – June 11, 2005	September 30, 2008
Garfield Gets His Just Desserts: His 47th Book	June 12, 2005 – January 7, 2006	January 27, 2009
Garfield Will Eat For Food: His 48th Book	January 8, 2006 – August 5, 2006	August 25, 2009
Garfield Weighs His Options: His 49th Book	August 6, 2006 – March 3, 2007	January 26, 2010
Garfield Potbelly of Gold: His 50th Book	March 4, 2007 – September 29, 2007	August 31, 2010
Garfield Shovels It In: His 51st Book	September 30, 2007 – April 26, 2008	January 25, 2011
Garfield Lard of the Jungle: His 52nd Book	April 27, 2008 – November 22, 2008	August 30, 2011
Garfield Brings Home The Bacon: His 53rd Book	November 23, 2008 – June 20, 2009	January 31, 2012
Garfield Gets in a Pickle: His 54th Book	June 21, 2009 – January 16, 2010	September 11, 2012
Garfield Sings for His Supper: His 55th Book	January 17, 2010 – August 14, 2010	March 12, 2013
Garfield Caution: Wide Load: His 56th Book	August 15, 2010 – March 12, 2011	September 10, 2013
Garfield Souped Up: His 57th Book	March 13, 2011 – October 8, 2011	January 28, 2014
Garfield Goes To His Happy Place: His 58th Book	October 9, 2011 – May 5, 2012	August 26, 2014
Garfield the Big Cheese: His 59th Book	May 6, 2012 – December 1, 2012	January 27, 2015
Garfield Cleans His Plate: His 60th Book	December 2, 2012 – June 29, 2013	August 25, 2015
Garfield Chickens Out: His 61st Book	June 30, 2013 – January 25, 2014	May 10, 2016
Garfield Listens To His Gut: His 62nd Book	January 26, 2014 – August 23, 2014	December 20, 2016
Garfield Cooks Up Trouble: His 63rd Book	August 24, 2014 – March 21, 2015	June 13, 2017
Garfield Feeds His Face: His 64th Book	March 22, 2015 – October 17, 2015	December 12, 2017
Garfield Eats and Runs: His 65th Book	October 18, 2015 – May 14, 2016	May 15, 2018
Garfield Nutty as a Fruitcake: His 66th Book	May 15, 2016 – December 10, 2016	December 11, 2018
Garfield Slurps and Burps: His 67th Book	December 11, 2016 – July 8, 2017	June 11, 2019
Garfield Belly Laughs: His 68th Book	July 9, 2017 – February 3, 2018	December 10, 2019
Garfield Easy as Pie: His 69th Book	February 4, 2018 – September 1, 2018	July 14, 2020
Garfield Goes Hog Wild: His 70th Book	September 2, 2018 – March 30, 2019	December 15, 2020
Garfield What Leftovers?: His 71st Book	March 31, 2019 – October 26, 2019	June 15, 2021
Garfield Livin' The Sweet Life: His 72nd Book	October 27, 2019 – May 23, 2020	December 7, 2021
Garfield Road Pizza: His 73rd Book	May 24, 2020 – December 19, 2020	June 7, 2022
Garfield Home Cookin: His 74th Book	December 20, 2020 - July 17, 2021	June 6, 2023
Garfield Fully Caffeinated: His 75th Book	July 18, 2021 – February 12, 2022	December 5, 2023
Garfield Donut Disturb: His 76th Book	February 13, 2022 – September 10, 2022	August 27, 2024
Garfield Bacon Me Drool: His 77th Book	September 11, 2022 - April 8, 2023	June 3, 2025
Garfield Crash Diet: His 78th Book	April 9, 2023 – November 4, 2023	December 2, 2025
Garfield Half-Baked: His 79th Book	November 5, 2023 - June 1, 2024	June 2, 2026
Garfield Lord of the Fries: His 80th Book	June 2, 2024 - December 28, 2024	June 1, 2027
Untitled 81st Book	December 29, 2024 - July 26, 2025	TBA
Untitled 82nd Book	July 27, 2025 - February 21, 2026	TBA

=== Garfield Classics ===
The Garfield Classics imprint has been in print since 2001, and reprints Garfield's first 36 books in a "remastered" format, with increased page size, bolder lines, and each strip in full-color format.

Title	Comics Years	Release date
Garfield At Large: His First Book	June 19, 1978 – January 22, 1979	May 29, 2001
Garfield Gains Weight: His Second Book	January 23, 1979 – September 22, 1979	November 27, 2001
Garfield Bigger Than Life: His Third Book	September 23, 1979 – March 30, 1980	February 26, 2002
Garfield Weighs In: His Fourth Book	March 31, 1980 – November 2, 1980	June 25, 2002
Garfield Takes the Cake: His Fifth Book	November 3, 1980 – June 7, 1981	June 3, 2003
Garfield Eats His Heart Out: His Sixth Book	June 8, 1981 – January 10, 1982	December 30, 2003
Garfield Sits Around the House: His Seventh Book	January 11, 1982 – August 15, 1982	December 30, 2003
Garfield Tips the Scales: His Eighth Book	August 16, 1982 – March 20, 1983	June 29, 2004
Garfield Loses His Feet: His Ninth Book	March 21, 1983 – October 23, 1983	August 31, 2004
Garfield Makes It Big: His 10th Book	October 24, 1983 – May 27, 1984	June 28, 2005
Garfield Rolls On: His 11th Book	May 28, 1984 – December 30, 1984	July 26, 2005
Garfield Out to Lunch: His 12th Book	December 31, 1984 – August 4, 1985	April 25, 2006
Garfield Food for Thought: His 13th Book	August 5, 1985 – March 9, 1986	November 28, 2006
Garfield Swallows His Pride: His 14th Book	March 10, 1986 – October 12, 1986	April 17, 2007
Garfield World Wide: His 15th Book	October 13, 1986 – May 17, 1987	June 26, 2007
Garfield Rounds Out: His 16th Book	May 18, 1987 – December 19, 1987	June 24, 2008
Garfield Chews the Fat: His 17th Book	December 20, 1987 – July 24, 1988	August 26, 2008
Garfield Goes to Waist: His 18th Book	July 25, 1988 – February 25, 1989	April 28, 2009
Garfield Hangs Out: His 19th Book	February 26, 1989 – September 30, 1989	June 23, 2009
Garfield Takes Up Space: His 20th Book	October 1, 1989 – May 5, 1990	April 27, 2010
Garfield Says a Mouthful: His 21st Book	May 6, 1990 – December 4, 1990	June 22, 2010
Garfield By the Pound: His 22nd Book	December 5, 1990 – July 6, 1991	April 26, 2011
Garfield Keeps His Chins Up: His 23rd Book	July 7, 1991 – February 4, 1992	June 28, 2011
Garfield Takes His Licks: His 24th Book	February 5, 1992 – September 5, 1992	June 26, 2012
Garfield Hits the Big Time: His 25th Book	September 6, 1992 – April 10, 1993	May 21, 2013
Garfield Pulls His Weight: His 26th Book	April 11, 1993 – November 9, 1993	July 16, 2013
Garfield Dishes It Out: His 27th Book	November 10, 1993 – June 11, 1994	April 29, 2014
Garfield Life in the Fat Lane: His 28th Book	June 12, 1994 – January 10, 1995	June 24, 2014
Garfield Tons of Fun: His 29th Book	January 11, 1995 – August 12, 1995	March 10, 2015
Garfield Bigger and Better: His 30th Book	August 13, 1995 – March 12, 1996	June 30, 2015
Garfield Hams It Up: His 31st Book	March 13, 1996 – October 12, 1996	January 26, 2016
Garfield Thinks Big: His 32nd Book	October 13, 1996 – May 13, 1997	July 19, 2016
Garfield Throws His Weight Around: His 33rd Book	May 14, 1997 – December 13, 1997	January 17, 2017
Garfield Life to the Fullest: His 34th Book	December 14, 1997 – July 14, 1998	July 18, 2017
Garfield Feeds the Kitty: His 35th Book	July 15, 1998 – February 13, 1999	January 16, 2018
Garfield Hogs the Spotlight: His 36th Book	February 14, 1999 – September 11, 1999	July 17, 2018
New books are only available in new larger format starting with book 37#

=== Garfield Complete Works ===
Garfield Complete Works is a hardcover collection of Garfield strips, with both black and white (daily) and full-color (Sunday) comics. The first volume includes archival material and an introduction from Garfield creator Jim Davis.

Title	Comics Years	Release date
Garfield Complete Works: Volume 1: 1978 & 1979	June 19, 1978 – December 31, 1979	September 18, 2018
Garfield Complete Works: Volume 2: 1980 & 1981	January 1, 1980 – December 31, 1981	March 19, 2019

In the UK, over 60 Garfield books, mainly "Pocket Books" or paperbacks, have been published by Ravette. The format is slightly different, with the strips presented in a vertical style. In the Garfield 20th anniversary book, however, Davis said vertical stacking was the one type of comic anthology layout he wanted to avoid the most when compiling the above collections.

Additionally, adaptations of Garfield television specials have been published in comic format:

- Garfield as Himself (1997) contains the following books:
  - Here Comes Garfield (1982)
  - Garfield on the Town (1983)
  - Garfield Gets a Life (1991)
- Garfield Holiday Celebrations (1997) contains the following books:
  - Garfield in Disguise (Halloween special) (1985)
  - Garfield's Thanksgiving (1988)
  - A Garfield Christmas (1987)
- Garfield Travel Adventures (1998) contains the following books:
  - Garfield in the Rough (1984)
  - Garfield in Paradise (1986)
  - Garfield Goes Hollywood (1987)

=== Garfield Fat Cat Three Pack ===
Each Fat Cat volume contains the contents of three successive compilations stacked back-to-back.

There are two types of Fat Cat books, one featuring black and white strips and one featuring full color strips.

Volumes 1 to 12 have been released in black and white, but most have since been reissued in full color.

The black and white strips were published semi-annually up to Vol. 11 (compilations 31–33) in 1999. Since then, the publication schedule has slowed: Vol. 12 (compilations 34–36) was published in 2001, followed by Vol. 13 (compilations 37–39) in 2006.

=== Black and white strips ===
- Vol. 1 (1,2,3) was released on March 16, 1993.
- Vol. 2 (4,5,6) was released on August 9, 1994. ISBN 978-0-345-39192-6
- Vol. 3 (7,8,9) was released on January 30, 1995. ISBN 978-0-345-39493-4
- Vol. 4 (10,11,12) was released on August 15, 1995. ISBN 978-0-345-40238-7
- Vol. 5 (13,14,15) was released on January 30, 1996. ISBN 978-0-345-40404-6
- Vol. 6 (16,17,18) was released on September 3, 1996. ISBN 978-0-345-40884-6
- Vol. 7 (19,20,21) was released on April 7, 1997. ISBN 978-0-345-41449-6
- Vol. 8 (22,23,24) was released on January 20, 1998. ISBN 978-0-345-42601-7
- Vol. 9 (25,26,27) was released on August 25, 1998. ISBN 978-0-345-42903-2
- Vol. 10 (28,29,30) was released on February 2, 1999. ISBN 978-0-345-43458-6
- Vol. 11 (31,32,33) was released on September 7, 1999. ISBN 978-0-345-43801-0
- Vol. 12 (34,35,36) was released on April 3, 2001. ISBN 978-0-345-44581-0

=== Color strips ===
The first twelve Fat Cat volumes have been reissued in larger, colorized versions. Starting from Fat Cat Vol. 13 (2006), the larger, full-color format of the reissued volumes has also been used.

- Vol. 1 (1,2,3) was released on August 26, 2003. ISBN 978-0-345-46455-2
- Vol. 2 (4,5,6) was released on August 30, 2005. ISBN 978-0-345-46465-1
- Vol. 3 (7,8,9) was released on September 25, 2007. ISBN 978-0-345-48088-0
- Vol. 4 (10,11,12) was released on March 24, 2009. ISBN 978-0-345-49171-8
- Vol. 5 (13,14,15) was released on October 26, 2010. ISBN 978-0-345-49180-0
- Vol. 6 (16,17,18) was released on March 22, 2011. ISBN 978-0-345-52420-1
- Vol. 7 (19,20,21) was released on April 24, 2012. ISBN 978-0-345-52588-8
- Vol. 8 (22,23,24) was released on March 4, 2014. ISBN 978-0345525994
- Vol. 9 (25,26,27) was released on April 28, 2015. ISBN 978-0345526076
- Vol. 10 (28,29,30) was released on November 25, 2016. ISBN 978-0425285589
- Vol. 11 (31,32,33) was released on November 14, 2017. ISBN 978-0425285664
- Vol. 12 (34,35,36) was released on March 19, 2019. ISBN 978-0425285787
- Vol. 13 (37,38,39) was released on August 29, 2006. ISBN 978-0-345-46460-6
- Vol. 14 (40,41,42) was released on October 27, 2009. ISBN 978-0-345-49175-6
- Vol. 15 (43,44,45) was released on October 25, 2011. ISBN 978-0-345-52585-7
- Vol. 16 (46,47,48) was released on February 12, 2013. ISBN 978-0-345-52592-5
- Vol. 17 (49,50,51) was released on October 28, 2014. ISBN 978-0-345-52603-8
- Vol. 18 (52,53,54) was released on June 7, 2016. ISBN 978-0-399-59440-3
- Vol. 19 (55,56,57) was released on March 14, 2017. ISBN 978-0425285619
- Vol. 20 (58,59,60) was released on March 13, 2018. ISBN 978-0425285718
- Vol. 21 (61,62,63) was released on July 16, 2019. ISBN 978-1-9848-1775-4
- Vol. 22 (64,65,66) was released on October 6, 2020. ISBN 978-0-593-15638-4
- Vol. 23 (67,68,69) was released on May 4, 2021. ISBN 978-0-593-15639-1
- Vol. 24 (70,71,72) was released on December 6, 2022. ISBN 978-0-593-15650-6
- Vol. 25 (73,74,75) was released on December 3, 2024. ISBN 978-0-593-87349-6
- Vol. 26 (76,77,78) will be released on December 1, 2026. ISBN 978-0-5938-7356-4

=== Treasury ===
10 Garfield Treasury compilations have been released featuring the Sunday strips in the large color format.

Garfield Treasury was released on June 12, 1984. Features comic strips from: June 25, 1978 to July 13, 1980
The Second Garfield Treasury
The Third Garfield Treasury was released on October 12, 1985
The Fourth Garfield Treasury
The Fifth Garfield Treasury
The Sixth Garfield Treasury
The Seventh Garfield Treasury was released on October 19, 1993. Features comic strips from: February 3, 1991 to March 7, 1993
The Eighth Garfield Treasury was released on October 31, 1995. Features comic strips from: March 14, 1993 to April 16, 1995
The Ninth Garfield Treasury was released on November 11, 1997. Features comic strips from: April 23, 1995 to May 25, 1997
The Tenth Garfield Treasury was released on October 5, 1999. Features comic strips from: May 25, 1997 to July 25, 1999

=== Others ===
- Garfield: His 9 Lives (1984), graphic novel, later made into a TV special.
- Garfield: Big Fat Book of Jokes and Riddles (1985)
- The Unabridged Uncensored Unbelievable Garfield (1986)
- Garfield Book of Cat Names (1988)
- Garfield How to Party Book (1988)
- Garfield Crazy About Numbers (1988) – (sticker book)
- Give Me Coffee and No One Gets Hurt (discontinued)
- Garfield the Easter Bunny? (1989)
- Garfield and the Santa Spy (1989)
- Garfield's Judgment Day (1990)
- Garfield: The Me Book (1990) (motivational handbook)
- Garfield and the Truth About Cats (1991)
- Garfield's Insults, Put-Downs & Slams (1994)
- Garfield Discovers America (1994)
- Garfield Jolly Holiday 3-pack (1997) – Renamed to Garfield Holiday Celebrations in 2004
- Garfield's Book of Jokes and Riddles (1997)
- The Garfield Game Book (1998)
- 20 Years & Still Kicking!: Garfield's Twentieth Anniversary Collection (1998)
- Garfield's Big Book of Excellent Excuses (2000)
- Garfield: The Gruesome Twosome 2 in 1 Book (2002)
- I'm in the Mood for Food: In the Kitchen with Garfield (2003)
- Garfield at 25: In Dog Years I'd Be Dead (2003)
- How to Draw Garfield and the Gang (2004)
- Garfield's Guide to Everything (2004)
- Odie Unleashed: Garfield Lets the Dog Out Book (2005)
- The Garfield Journal (2005)
- Lights, Camera, Hairballs: Garfield at the Movies (2006)
- 30 Years of Laughs & Lasagna (2008)
- Garfield Minus Garfield (2008)
- Garfield from the Trash Bin: Rescued Rejects & Outrageous Outtakes (2010)
- Garfield Left Speechless (2012)
- My Laughable Life with Garfield: The Jon Arbuckle Chronicles (2012), a collection of various comic strips throughout the years
- Garfield…Recipes with Cattitude! (2013)
- Age Happens: Garfield Hits the Big 4-0 (2018), a collection of Garfield's birthday strips since 1978; foreword by Lin-Manuel Miranda

Early-reader adventure novels featuring Garfield

- Garfield's Night Before Christmas (1988)
- Garfield's Furry Tales (1989)
- Garfield and the Haunted Diner (1990)
- Garfield Goes Camping (1991)
- Garfield's Haunted House and Other Spooky Tales (1994)
- Garfield's Stupid Cupid and Other Stories (1995)
- Garfield Goes to Disobedience School (1997)
- Garfield's Christmas Tales (1994)
- Garfield's Ghost Stories (1990)
- Garfield and the Beast in the Basement (2002)
- Garfield and the Mysterious Mummy (1997)
- Garfield and the Teacher Creature (1998)
- Garfield and the Wicked Wizard (2002)

Garfield's Pet Force, series of early-reader novels:

- #1: The Outrageous Origin (1997)
- #2: Pie Rat's Revenge (1998)
- #3: K-Niner: Dog of Doom (1998)
- #4: Menace of the Mutanator (1999)
- #5: Attack of the Lethal Lizards (1999)

Garfield Extreme, a series of children's picture books.

- Garfield's Extreme Cuisine: Pigging the Way Out! (2003)
- Garfield's Ironcat (2003)
- Garfield's Awesome Ski Adventure (2002)
- Garfield's Sumo Beach Bellyball (2002)

== Home video releases ==
=== VHS ===
- Here Comes Garfield (August 6, 1992)
- Garfield on the Town (August 6, 1992)
- Garfield in the Rough (August 6, 1992)
- Garfield in Paradise (August 6, 1992)
- Garfield Goes Hollywood (August 6, 1992)
- Garfield's Thanksgiving (October 8, 1992)
- Garfield: His 9 Lives (March 3, 1993)
- Garfield's Halloween Adventure (October 20, 1993)
- Garfield's Babes and Bullets (January 26, 1994)
- A Garfield Christmas (October 1, 1996)
- Garfield's Feline Fantasies (July 29, 1997)
- Garfield Gets a Life (January 1, 2002)
- Garfield: The Movie (October 19, 2004)

=== DVD ===
- Garfield as Himself (June 29, 2004)
- Garfield and Friends: Volume One (July 27, 2004)
- Garfield: The Movie (October 19, 2004)
- Garfield Holiday Celebrations (October 26, 2004)
- Garfield and Friends: Volume Two (December 7, 2004)
- Garfield Travel Adventures (February 15, 2005)
- Garfield and Friends: Volume Three (April 19, 2005)
- Garfield Fantasies (May 24, 2005)
- Garfield and Friends: Volume Four (August 30, 2005)
- Garfield and Friends: Volume Five (December 6, 2005)
- Garfield: A Tail of Two Kitties (October 10, 2006)
- Garfield and Friends: Behind the Scenes (December 5, 2006)
- Garfield and Friends: An Ode to Odie (March 20, 2007)
- Garfield and Friends: Dreams & Schemes (September 4, 2007)
- Garfield Gets Real (November 20, 2007)
- Garfield and Friends: A Cat and His Nerd (May 13, 2008)
- Garfield's Fun Fest (August 5, 2008)
- Garfield's Pet Force (June 16, 2009)
- The Garfield Show: Odie Oh! (October 5, 2010)
- The Garfield Show: All You Need is Love (and Pasta) (January 4, 2011)
- The Garfield Show: Private-Eye Ventures (April 12, 2011)
- The Garfield Show: Spooky Tails (August 23, 2011)
- The Garfield Show: Dinosaurs & Other Animal Adventures (January 10, 2012)
- The Garfield Show: Summer Adventures (May 29, 2012)
- The Garfield Show: Holiday Extravaganza (September 4, 2012)
- The Garfield Show: Spring Fun Collection (February 19, 2013)
- The Garfield Show: Pizza Dreams (June 25, 2013)
- The Garfield Show: A Purr-Fect Life! (October 22, 2013)
- The Garfield Show: It's Showtime (February 18, 2014)
- The Garfield Show: Best Friends Forever (July 29, 2014)
- The Garfield Show: Techno Cat (November 4, 2014)
- Garfield Holiday Collection (November 4, 2014)
- Happy Holidays, Garfield! (September 12, 2017)
- Garfield: Nine Lives (February 13, 2018)
- Garfield: 20 Garfield Stories (June 12, 2018)
- Garfield's Halloween Adventure (August 28, 2018)
- Garfield and Friends: Season 1 (July 16, 2019)
- Garfield and Friends: Season 2 (November 5, 2019)
- Garfield and Friends: Season 3 (October 27, 2020)
- Garfield and Friends: The Grumpy Cat Collection (June 15, 2021)
- The Garfield Movie (August 27, 2024)

=== Blu-Ray ===
- Garfield: The Movie (October 11, 2011)
- Garfield: A Tail of Two Kitties (October 11, 2011)
- The Garfield Movie (August 27, 2024)

== Video games ==
Garfield has been featured in video games, beginning with an unreleased Atari 2600 prototype in 1984. Later, an 8-bit Famicom game of Garfield was produced in Japan in 1989. A Garfield game for the Atari 5200 had begun development, but was cancelled when Atari was taken over by Jack Tramiel.

Game	Details
Garfield Original release date(s): 1984	Release years by system: 1984—Atari 2600
Garfield Original release date(s): 1984	Notes: released prototype and Developed by Atari.
Garfield, Eat Your Words Original release date(s): 1985	Release years by system: 1985—Apple II
Garfield, Eat Your Words Original release date(s): 1985	Notes: Developed and published by Random House.
Garfield Double Dares Original release date(s): 1985	Release years by system: 1985—Apple II, Commodore 64
Garfield Double Dares Original release date(s): 1985	Notes: Developed and published by Random House.
Create with Garfield Original release date(s): NA: 1986; EU: 1986	Release years by system: 1986-Apple II, Commodore 64, IBM PC
Create with Garfield Original release date(s): NA: 1986; EU: 1986	Notes: Developed by Ahead Designs and published by Development Learning Materials, Inc.
Garfield: Big Fat Hairy Deal Original release date(s): EU: 1987	Release years by system: 1987-Amiga, Amstrad CPC, Atari ST, Commodore 64, ZX Spectrum
Garfield: Big Fat Hairy Deal Original release date(s): EU: 1987	Notes: Developed and published by Edge Games.
Garfield Trivia Game Original release date(s): 1989	Release years by system: 1989—Apple II, IBM PC
Garfield Trivia Game Original release date(s): 1989	Notes: Developed by EIS, Inc. and distributed by Developmental Learning Materials, Inc.
A Week of Garfield Original release date(s): JP: April 7, 1989	Release years by system: 1989-Family Computer
A Week of Garfield Original release date(s): JP: April 7, 1989	Notes: Developed by Mars Corp. and published by Towa Chiki.
Garfield: Winter's Tail Original release date(s): EU: 1989	Release years by system: 1989-Amiga, Atari ST, Commodore 64, ZX Spectrum
Garfield: Winter's Tail Original release date(s): EU: 1989	Notes: Developed by Softek and published by The Edge.
Garfield Original release date(s): NA: 1991	Release years by system: 1991 – Tiger Handheld Electronic
Garfield Original release date(s): NA: 1991	Notes: Developed by Konami.
Garfield Labyrinth Original release date(s): EU: September 1993	Release years by system: 1993 – Game Boy
Garfield Labyrinth Original release date(s): EU: September 1993	Notes: Developed and published by Kemco.; Reskin of Kemco's Mickey Mouse IV, which was released in Japan a few months prior.
Garfield: Caught in the Act Original release date(s): NA: October 31, 1995; EU: December 8, 1995; JP: March 1996	Release years by system: 1995 – Sega Genesis/Mega Drive, Game Gear, Microsoft Windows
Garfield: Caught in the Act Original release date(s): NA: October 31, 1995; EU: December 8, 1995; JP: March 1996	Notes: Developed and published by Sega.; Developed by Novotrade International (Game Gear); Developed by Point of View (Windows)
Scholastic's Comic Book Maker Featuring Garfield Original release date(s): NA: 1998	Release years by system: 1998 – PC, Mac OS
Scholastic's Comic Book Maker Featuring Garfield Original release date(s): NA: 1998	Notes: Developed by PAWS and published by Brighter Child.
Garfield's Mad About Cats Original release date(s): NA: 1999	Release years by system: 1999 – PC, Mac OS
Garfield's Mad About Cats Original release date(s): NA: 1999	Notes: Developed by PAWS and published by Brighter Child.; Lorenzo Music's final voice role.
Garfield's Typing Pal Original release date(s): NA: 2003	Release years by system: 2003 – PC
Garfield's Typing Pal Original release date(s): NA: 2003	Notes: Developed and published by De Marque.
Garfield Original release date(s): EU: November 19, 2004; NA: May 17, 2005	Release years by system: 2004 – PlayStation 2, PC
Garfield Original release date(s): EU: November 19, 2004; NA: May 17, 2005	Notes: Published by Hip Interactive and developed by The Code Monkeys.
Garfield: The Search for Pooky Original release date(s): EU: November 2004; NA: November 14, 2005	Release years by system: 2004 – Game Boy Advance
Garfield: The Search for Pooky Original release date(s): EU: November 2004; NA: November 14, 2005	Notes: Developed by InterActive Vision and published by The Game Factory.
Garfield: Saving Arlene Original release date(s): JP: April 27, 2006; EU: 2006	Release years by system: 2005 – PlayStation 2, PC
Garfield: Saving Arlene Original release date(s): JP: April 27, 2006; EU: 2006	Notes: Developed by ECO Software and published by Titus Software and Hip Games.
Garfield and His Nine Lives Original release date(s): PAL: May 5, 2006; NA: May 10, 2006	Release years by system: 2006 – Game Boy Advance
Garfield and His Nine Lives Original release date(s): PAL: May 5, 2006; NA: May 10, 2006	Notes: Developed by Lucky Jump Games and published by The Game Factory.
Garfield: A Tail of Two Kitties Original release date(s): EU: August 25, 2006; NA: October 17, 2006	Release years by system: 2006-Nintendo DS, PlayStation 2, PC
Garfield: A Tail of Two Kitties Original release date(s): EU: August 25, 2006; NA: October 17, 2006	Notes: Developed by Asobo Studio (PS2 and PC) and published by The Game Factory; Developed by Two Tribes B.V. (DS)
Garfield's Nightmare Original release date(s): EU: March 9, 2007; NA: August 28, 2007	Release years by system: 2007 – Nintendo DS
Garfield's Nightmare Original release date(s): EU: March 9, 2007; NA: August 28, 2007	Notes: Developed by Shin'en Multimedia and published by The Game Factory
Garfield: Lasagna World Tour Original release date(s): EU: November 30, 2007; NA: June 27, 2008	Release years by system: 2007 – PlayStation 2, PC
Garfield: Lasagna World Tour Original release date(s): EU: November 30, 2007; NA: June 27, 2008	Notes: Developed by EKO Software and published by Conspiracy Entertainment
Garfield's Fun Fest Original release date(s): NA: July 29, 2008; EU: August 29, 2008	Release years by system: 2008 – Nintendo DS
Garfield's Fun Fest Original release date(s): NA: July 29, 2008; EU: August 29, 2008	Notes: Developed by Black Lantern Studios and published by DSI Games
Garfield Gets Real Original release date(s): EU: October 17, 2008; NA: May 12, 2009; AU: July 21, 2009	Release years by system: 2008 – Wii (canceled), Nintendo DS
Garfield Gets Real Original release date(s): EU: October 17, 2008; NA: May 12, 2009; AU: July 21, 2009	Notes: Developed by Gravity-i and published by Zoo Digital Publishing and DSI Games
The Garfield Show: Threat of the Space Lasagna Original release date(s): July 8, 2010	Release years by system: 2010 – Wii, PC
The Garfield Show: Threat of the Space Lasagna Original release date(s): July 8, 2010	Notes: Developed by Eko Systems and published by Zoo Games
Garfield's Wild Ride Original release date(s): 2013	Release years by system: 2013 – iOS, Android, PC
Garfield's Wild Ride Original release date(s): 2013	Notes: Developed and published by Bandai Namco Entertainment
Garfield Kart Original release date(s): November 2, 2013	Release years by system: 2013 – iOS, Android, 3DS, PC,
Garfield Kart Original release date(s): November 2, 2013	Notes: Developed by Artefacts Studios and published by Microïds
Garfield Kart - Furious Racing Original release date(s): PC: November 6, 2019; NS, PS4, XBO: November 19, 2019	Release years by system: 2019 – Nintendo Switch, PlayStation 4, Xbox One, PC,
Garfield Kart - Furious Racing Original release date(s): PC: November 6, 2019; NS, PS4, XBO: November 19, 2019	Notes: Developed by Artefacts Studios and published by Microïds
Nickelodeon All-Star Brawl Original release date(s): October 5, 2021	Release years by system: 2021 – PC, NS, PS4, PS5, XBO, XBX/S
Nickelodeon All-Star Brawl Original release date(s): October 5, 2021	Notes: Garfield appears as a playable character included through a free DLC update.
Nickelodeon Kart Racers 3: Slime Speedway Original release date(s): October 14, 2022	Release years by system: 2022 – PC, NS, PS4, PS5, XBO, XBX/S
Garfield Lasagna Party Original release date(s): November 15, 2022	Release years by system: 2022 – NS, PC, PS4, PS5, XBO, XBX/S
Garfield Pinball Original release date(s): February 16, 2023	Release years by system: 2023 – NS, PC, PS4, PS5, XBO, XBX/S
Garfield Pinball Original release date(s): February 16, 2023	Notes: single table DLC, after previously appearing in Zen Pinball Party in 2021 on Apple Arcade.
Garfield Kart 2 - All You Can Drift Original release date(s): September 10, 2025	Release years by system: 2025 – NS, PC, PS5, XBX/S
Garfield: Escape from Monday Original release date(s): September 24, 2026	Release years by system: 2026 – NS, PC, PS5, XBX/S
Garfield: Escape from Monday Original release date(s): September 24, 2026	Notes: Developed by Osome Studio and published by Microids

== Television ==
=== Specials ===
- Here Comes Garfield (October 25, 1982)
- Garfield on the Town (October 28, 1983)
- Garfield in the Rough (October 26, 1984)
- Garfield's Halloween Adventure (October 30, 1985)
- Garfield in Paradise (May 27, 1986)
- Garfield Goes Hollywood (May 8, 1987)
- A Garfield Christmas (December 21, 1987)
- Happy Birthday, Garfield (May 17, 1988)
- Garfield: His 9 Lives (November 22, 1988)
- Garfield's Babes and Bullets (May 23, 1989)
- Garfield's Thanksgiving (November 22, 1989)
- Garfield's Feline Fantasies (May 18, 1990)
- Garfield Gets a Life (May 8, 1991)

=== Animated series ===
- Garfield and Friends (1988–1994)
- The Garfield Show (2008–2016)
- Garfield Originals (2019–2020)
- Garfield (2026)

== Films ==
=== Theatrical films ===
- Garfield: The Movie (2004) — Breckin Meyer, Jennifer Love Hewitt, and Bill Murray as the voice of Garfield.
- Garfield: A Tail of Two Kitties (2006) — Breckin Meyer, Jennifer Love Hewitt, and Bill Murray as the voice of Garfield.
- The Garfield Movie (2024) — Samuel L. Jackson, and Chris Pratt as the voice of Garfield.

=== Direct-to-video films ===
- Garfield Gets Real (2007)
- Garfield's Fun Fest (2008)
- Garfield's Pet Force (2009)

=== Crew ===
Role	Theatrical films			Direct-to-video films		
Role	Garfield: The Movie (2004)	Garfield: A Tail of Two Kitties (2006)	The Garfield Movie (2024)	Garfield Gets Real (2007)	Garfield's Fun Fest (2008)	Garfield's Pet Force (2009)
Director	Peter Hewitt	Tim Hill	Mark Dindal	Mark A.Z. Dippé	Mark A.Z. Dippé	Mark A.Z. Dippé; Kyung Ho Lee
Producer	John Davis	John Davis	John Cohen; Steven P. Wegner; Andrew Kosove; Broderick Johnson; Tom Jacomb; Namit Malhotra	Jim Davis; John Davis	Jim Davis	Daniel Chuba; John Davis; Ash R. Shah
Writer	Joel Cohen; Alec Sokolow	Joel Cohen; Alec Sokolow	Paul A. Kaplan Mark Torgove David Reynolds	Jim Davis	Jim Davis	Jim Davis
Composer	Christophe Beck	Christophe Beck	John Debney	Kenneth Burgomaster	Kenneth Burgomaster	Kenneth Burgomaster
Editor	Michael A. Stevenson; Peter Berger	Peter S. Elliot	Mark Keefer	Rob Neal	Aaron Seelman	Rob Neal; Tom Sanders
Production companies	Davis Entertainment; Paws, Inc.	Davis Entertainment; Paws, Inc.	Alcon Entertainment; DNEG Animation	Davis Entertainment; Paws, Inc. The Animation Picture Company		Paws, Inc. The Animation Picture Company
Distributor	20th Century Fox		Columbia Pictures (under Sony Pictures Releasing)	20th Century Fox Home Entertainment		

=== Box office performance ===
Film	US Release date	Box office gross				Box office ranking		Budget	Ref(s)
Film	US Release date	Opening weekend	North America	Other territories	Worldwide	All time North America	All time Worldwide	Budget	Ref(s)
Garfield: The Movie	June 11, 2004	$21,727,611	$75,367,693	$132,726,857	$208,094,550	#1,140	#858	$50,000,000	
Garfield: A Tail of Two Kitties	June 16, 2006	$7,288,977	$28,426,747	$114,899,223	$143,325,970	#3,043	#1,272	$60,000,000	
Garfield Gets Real	August 9, 2007	$592,974		$1,726,453	$1,726,453				
Garfield's Fun Fest	August 5, 2008	$28,695		$3,068,511	$3,068,511				s
Garfield's Pet Force	June 16, 2009	$171,280		$11,445,294	$11,445,294		#7,193		
Total		$29,809,537	$103,794,440	$263,866,338	$482,560,001			$110,000,000	
List indicator: A dark grey cell indicates the information is not available for the film.

== Figurines and toys ==
Garfield toys have been produced by Danbury Mint.

- Small Figurines (no larger than 4" × 4" × 4"): Catnap, Crowning Achievement, Easy Rider, Here's Lookin' at Me, Gourmet Picnic, Love in Bloom, King of the Jungle, Open House, Midnight Serenade, On Vacation, Return to Sender, Sittin' Pretty
- Musicals (10" wood base with figurine atop): Anchors Aweigh, La Cucaracha, Sittin' on the Dock of the Bay; Oh, What a Beautiful Morning
- Garfield's Christmas Village (11 pieces in all, including): Garfield's House, Post Office, Movies, Toy Shoppe, Candy Store, Courthouse, Church, Bakery, and more.
- Large Figurines: Garfield's Retreat, Garfield's Poolside Resort, Garfield's Golf Course, Garfield's Garden
- Other: Garfield's Carousel and Garfield's Christmas Train
- Plush (2' tall): Bedtime for Garfield and Bedtime for Odie
- Diecast Vehicles: Both Ertl and Esci have made a range of die-cast toys of Garfield driving various vehicles

== Miscellaneous ==
- In 1991, GRP records released a Garfield-themed compilation album titled Am I Cool or What?
- Suction-cupped plush toys of Garfield, known as "Stuck on You", were a fad in America and it took several years for production to meet the demand.
- A line of plush products and other toy replicas were licensed for production by the Dakin Company in the 1980s.
- Garfield was featured in a 1988 advertising campaign for Maple Leaf Village Amusement Park.
- In 2000 Garfield was used as a mascot/recruiting tool for Cub Scouting, appearing on many items, including four plush Garfields in Cub Scout uniforms.
- Garfield and Odie were previously featured on product packaging for the retail chain Meijer.
- Baby Garfield is featured on Sam's Club brand diapers.
- At Kennywood, an amusement park located near Pittsburgh, Garfield was one of the mascots. From 2004 to 2020, the park housed a dark ride titled Garfield's Nightmare. A Garfield themed free-fall ride for children titled the "Pounce Bounce" was in operation. Lake Compounce, which was owned by Kennywood's owners, used Garfield theming as well.
- Silverwood Theme Park, the Northwests largest theme park near Coeur d'Alene Idaho, had Garfield as the official mascot.
- When Microsoft released the Windows 98 edition of Microsoft Plus!, Garfield was included on a desktop theme.
- Tyco released a novelty Garfield Telephone in 1978. They became the center of many news reports after they continuously washed up on a French beach over a 35-year period.

== Promotions ==
Garfield has been used in multiple promotional campaigns. In 1987 the fast food restaurant McDonald's sold Happy Meal toys, collectible mugs, and a limited edition stuffed Garfield employee. In 2019, it was found that the paint on these mugs contained lead, which exceeded the legal amount on an item intended to be used by children, in addition to high levels of cadmium.

Garfield was used in promotions for the Yum! Brands properties KFC and Taco Bell. In 2000, he was used in a Kid's Meal promotion for Wendy's, where 6 toys were sold. He was used in many promotions for Garfield: The Movie, including 3 Goldfish figures, and 5 Wendy's toys, including a card game, magnet doll, wind up toy, play clock, and a pair of sunglasses. He was also featured in a successful Dairy Queen Kid's Meal promotion, which included 5 toys of Garfield and 1 toy of Odie doing various outside activities. At Kmart, 3 toys were sold in the dining area.

== Commercials ==
- June 22, 1985 – American Express
- May 29, 1986 – McDonald's Stuck on You
- January 14, 1987 – Kellogg's
- November 19, 1987 – Alpo Cat Food
- December 12, 1987 – Kellogg's
- 1989 – Cadbury Garfield chocolates (Australia)
- July 23, 1989 – Purrr Cat Food (Canada)
- December 13, 1989 – General Mills Fruit Snacks
- August 13, 1990 – Garfield Fruit Snacks
- December 15, 1990 – Alpo Cat Food
- September 30, 1991 – Embassy Suites
- March 13, 1994 – Campbell's
- Chia Pet
