= Lloyd Vaughan =

American animator

Lloyd Lincoln Vaughan I (January 2, 1909 – May 19, 1988) was an American animator known for his work at Warner Bros. Cartoons under the supervision of Chuck Jones. Starting in 1936 as an inbetweener, and he only got paid $6.00 a week, he became an animator in 1944 or 1945 under Jones, and animated for him until the studio's brief closure in 1953. His most iconic work is the flower scene in Duck Amuck. In 1966, he reunited with Jones at MGM Animation/Visual Arts until 1970, and would continue to animate until his death.

== Other works ==
- How the Grinch Stole Christmas! (1966)
- The New Adventures of Huckleberry Finn (1968)
- The Adventures of Gulliver (1968)
- Scooby-Doo, Where Are You! (1969)
- Here Comes the Grump (1969)
- The Pink Panther Show (1969)
- The Phantom Tollbooth (1970)
- Help!... It's the Hair Bear Bunch! (1971)
- Heavy Traffic (1973)
- Laff-A-Lympics (1977)
- The Pink Panther in: Pink at First Sight (1981)
- Is This Goodbye, Charlie Brown? (1983)
- Garfield's Halloween Adventure (1985)
- Garfield in Paradise (1986)
- Garfield Goes Hollywood (1987)
- A Garfield Christmas Special (1987)
