= Paws, Inc. =

American animation studio and production company

- Trade name: Paws, Incorporated
- Type: Subsidiary
- Industry: Animation, Entertainment, Animation production
- Founded: 1981; 45 years ago, in Muncie, Indiana
- Founder: Jim Davis
- Headquarters: Los Angeles, California, United States
- Key people: Jim Davis (CEO)
- Products: Film production; Television production; Comics; Films
- Brands: Garfield; U.S. Acres
- Owner: Skydance
- Parent: Skydance Products & Publishing

Paws, Inc., doing business as Paws, Incorporated, is an American animation studio and production company founded by American cartoonist Jim Davis in 1981 to support the Garfield comic strips and its licensing. The company is located at the Paramount Pictures studio lot in Los Angeles. It was originally located in Muncie, Indiana, relocated in 1989 from Davis' own farm when he was a boy, and then was relocated to One Astor Plaza in New York City after being acquired in 2019 by the second incarnation of Viacom months before its re-merger with CBS Corporation.

== History ==
In 1994, the company purchased all rights to the classic Garfield comic strips from 1978 to 1993 from United Feature Syndicate, although United still holds the original black-and-white daily strips and original color Sunday strips. The full-color daily strips and recolored Sunday strips are copyrighted to Paws as they are considered a different product. The strip is currently distributed by Andrews McMeel Syndication (formerly Universal Press Syndicate and Universal Uclick), while rights for the strip remain with Paws, Inc. By 2015, the company employed almost fifty artists and administrators.

In 2019, Davis sold Paws, Inc. to the second incarnation of Viacom, which would later re-merge with CBS Corporation to form ViacomCBS, later renamed to Paramount Global, including global merchandising and existing licensees. The deal put Paws under Paramount's Nickelodeon banner (which itself is part of its Kids & Family division). The deal excluded the rights to the live-action Garfield films from 2004 to 2006, which are still owned by 20th Century Studios (which is now a division of The Walt Disney Company), as well as the animated film The Garfield Movie, which is owned and distributed by Sony Pictures under its Columbia Pictures label.

Although Paws, Inc. is now effectively located at the Paramount Pictures lot in Los Angeles as of the August 2025 formation of Paramount Skydance (now simply Skydance), Davis still continues to draw the comic strips in Indiana for newspapers and Andrews McMeel Syndication.

== Filmography ==
=== Television specials ===
Work	Original release	Studio partners	Network
Here Comes Garfield	1982	Bill Melendez Productions; Lee Mendelson Film Productions; United Media Productions	CBS
Garfield on the Town	1983	Bill Melendez Productions; Lee Mendelson Film Productions; United Media Productions	CBS
Garfield in the Rough	1984	Film Roman; United Media Productions	CBS
Garfield's Halloween Adventure	1985	Film Roman; United Media Productions	CBS
Garfield in Paradise	1986	Film Roman; United Media Productions	CBS
Garfield Goes Hollywood	1987	Film Roman; United Media Productions	CBS
A Garfield Christmas	1987	Film Roman; United Media Productions	CBS
Happy Birthday, Garfield	1988	Film Roman; United Media Productions	CBS
Garfield: His 9 Lives	1988	Film Roman; United Media Productions	CBS
Garfield's Babes and Bullets	1989	Film Roman; United Media Productions	CBS
Garfield's Thanksgiving	1989	Film Roman; United Media Productions	CBS
Garfield's Feline Fantasies	1990	Film Roman; United Media Productions	CBS
Garfield Gets a Life	1991	Film Roman; United Media Productions	CBS

=== Television series ===
Work	Original release	Studio partners	Network
Garfield and Friends	1988–1994	United Media Productions (seasons 1–6); Lee Mendelson Film Productions (seasons 2–7); Film Roman	CBS
The Garfield Show	2008–2016	Dargaud Media	France 3 (France); Cartoon Network (United States, seasons 1–3); Boomerang (United States, seasons 4–5)
Garfield Originals	2019–2020	Dargaud Media	France 3
Garfield	2026	Nickelodeon Animation Studio	Paramount+

=== Feature films ===
Work	Original release	Studio partners	Distributor	Notes
Garfield: The Movie	2004	20th Century Fox; Davis Entertainment	20th Century Fox	Live-action/CGI hybrid, theatrical feature
Garfield: A Tail of Two Kitties	2006	20th Century Fox; Davis Entertainment; Dune Entertainment; Major Studio Partners; Ingenious Film Partners	20th Century Fox	Live-action/CGI hybrid, theatrical feature
Garfield Gets Real	2007	20th Century Fox; Davis Entertainment; The Animation Picture Company	20th Century Fox Home Entertainment	Fully computer-animated, direct-to-video feature
Garfield's Fun Fest	2008	20th Century Fox; Davis Entertainment; The Animation Picture Company	20th Century Fox Home Entertainment	Fully computer-animated, direct-to-video feature
Garfield's Pet Force	2009	20th Century Fox; Davis Entertainment; The Animation Picture Company	20th Century Fox Home Entertainment	Fully computer-animated, direct-to-video feature
The Garfield Movie	2024	Alcon Entertainment; DNEG Animation; Prime Focus; One Cool Group; Wayfarer Studios; Stage 6 Films; John Cohen Productions; Andrews McMeel Entertainment	Columbia Pictures/Sony Pictures Releasing	Fully computer-animated, theatrical feature
The Garfield Movie 2	TBA	Alcon Entertainment; DNEG Animation; Prime Focus; John Cohen Productions	Columbia Pictures/Sony Pictures Releasing	Fully computer-animated, theatrical feature
