= List of Garfield home video releases =

Garfield is a U.S. comic strip created by Jim Davis that has been the subject of numerous television specials and series. Many of these specials have been compiled on DVD releases.

In June 2004, the DVD Garfield as Himself, was released. DVD Talk critic Randy Miller judged the Garfield as Himself specials to be "quite enjoyable." The DVD debuted 35th in sales. That year, Garfield Holiday Celebrations appeared 23rd in TV DVD sales for the week of November 10, 2007. In 2014, Entertainment Weekly reported copies of the DVD "were selling on eBay like rare collector’s items."

Garfield Holiday Collection was released on November 4, 2014, sold only by Walmart, and was also made available for digital download on November 11 that year. Davis explained that in compiling the DVD, he went beyond the holiday-themed specials to include personal favorites.

The content of Garfield DVDs varies between countries; listed below are all of the episodes linked to each release.

== DVDs ==
=== Compilations ===
Title	DVD release dates		Episode(s)
Title	Region 1	Region 2	Episode(s)
Garfield As Himself	June 29, 2004	August 16, 2004	Here Comes Garfield (1982); Garfield on the Town (1983); Garfield Gets a Life (1991); Garfield Goes Hollywood (1987) (replaces "Garfield Gets a Life" on Region 2 edition); Inside Look - Garfield: The Movie
Garfield Holiday Celebrations	October 26, 2004	December 6, 2004	Garfield's Halloween Adventure (1985); Garfield's Thanksgiving (1989); A Garfield Christmas (1987); Garfield in the Rough (1984) (replaces "Garfield's Thanksgiving" on Region 2 edition); Inside Look - Garfield: The Movie
Garfield Travel Adventures	February 15, 2005	—N/a	Garfield in the Rough (1984); Garfield in Paradise (1986); Garfield Goes Hollywood (1987); Robots Behind the Scenes
Garfield Fantasies	May 24, 2005	November 7, 2005	Garfield's Babes and Bullets (1989); Garfield's Feline Fantasies (1990); Garfield: His 9 Lives (1988)
Garfield Holiday Collection	November 4, 2014	—N/a	Garfield's Halloween Adventure (1985); Garfield's Thanksgiving (1989); A Garfield Christmas (1987); Garfield in Paradise (1986); Garfield on the Town (1983)
Happy Holidays, Garfield!	September 12, 2017	—N/a	A Garfield Christmas (1987); Garfield's Thanksgiving (1989)
Garfield: Nine Lives	February 13, 2018	—N/a	Garfield: His 9 Lives (1988); Garfield in the Rough (1984)
Garfield's Halloween Adventure	August 28, 2018	—N/a	Garfield's Halloween Adventure (1985); Garfield Goes Hollywood (1987)

=== Series ===
Garfield and Friends releases:

Season	Set details	DVD release dates		Studio
Season	Set details	Region 1	Region 2	Studio
1	Discs: 2; Episodes: 13; 16:9 aspect ratio	2019		PBS Distribution
2	Discs: 3; 4:3 aspect ratio	2019		PBS Distribution
3	Discs: 2; 16:9 aspect ratio	2020		PBS Distribution
