= Garfield television specials =

- Title cards for all twelve Garfield television specials
- Genre: Comedy
- Created by: Jim Davis
- Based on: Garfield created by Jim Davis
- Written by: Jim Davis
- Screenplay by: Jim Davis
- Story by: Jim Davis
- Directed by: Phil Roman
- Voices of: Lorenzo Music
- Theme music composer: Ed Bogas and Desirée Goyette (music and lyrics); Lou Rawls, Gregg Berger, Desirée Goyette and Lorenzo Music (vocals)
- Country of origin: United States
- Original language: English
- No. of episodes: 12

Production
- Producers: Lee Mendelson and Bill Melendez (1982–1983); Phil Roman (1984–1991)
- Running time: 24 minutes 48 minutes (Garfield: His 9 Lives)
- Production companies: Mendelson/Melendez Productions (1982–1983); Film Roman (1984–1991); United Media; Paws, Inc.

Original release
- Network: CBS
- Release: October 25, 1982 – May 8, 1991

The Garfield television specials are a series of twelve half-hour long American animated television specials based on the Garfield comic strip of the same name created by Jim Davis. Most specials were directed by Phil Roman, written by Davis, and featuring the voice of Lorenzo Music as the character. The specials were originally broadcast on CBS from 1982 to 1991. Although the first two specials were produced by Lee Mendelson Films, this boutique studio was fully committed to the production of the Peanuts animated specials and could not allocate resources for the Garfield specials. All of the remaining Garfield specials were produced by Roman's own production company and namesake Film Roman.

== List ==
List of Garfield television specials
| Title | Original airing date | Director | Producer(s) | Garfield | Notes |
|---|---|---|---|---|---|
| Here Comes Garfield | October 25, 1982 | Phil Roman | Lee Mendelson and Bill Melendez | Lorenzo Music | 1983 Emmy nominee. |
| Garfield on the Town | October 28, 1983 | Phil Roman | Lee Mendelson and Bill Melendez | Lorenzo Music | 1984 Emmy winner. |
| Garfield in the Rough | October 26, 1984 | Phil Roman | Phil Roman | Lorenzo Music | 1985 Emmy winner. |
| Garfield's Halloween Adventure | October 30, 1985 | Phil Roman | Phil Roman | Lorenzo Music | 1986 Emmy winner. |
| Garfield in Paradise | May 27, 1986 | Phil Roman | Phil Roman | Lorenzo Music | 1986 Emmy nominee. |
| Garfield Goes Hollywood | May 8, 1987 | Phil Roman | Phil Roman | Lorenzo Music | 1987 Emmy nominee. |
| A Garfield Christmas | December 21, 1987 | Phil Roman | Phil Roman | Lorenzo Music | 1988 Emmy nominee. |
| Garfield: His 9 Lives | November 22, 1988 | Phil Roman | Phil Roman | Lorenzo Music | Animated adaptation of the illustrated/comic book of the same name; 1989 Emmy nominee. |
| Garfield's Babes and Bullets | May 23, 1989 | Phil Roman | Phil Roman | Lorenzo Music | Adapted from a short story in Garfield: His 9 Lives. 1989 Emmy winner. |
| Garfield's Thanksgiving | November 22, 1989 | Phil Roman | Phil Roman | Lorenzo Music | 1990 Emmy nominee. |
| Garfield's Feline Fantasies | May 18, 1990 | Phil Roman | Phil Roman | Lorenzo Music | 1990 Emmy nominee. |
| Garfield Gets a Life | May 8, 1991 | John Sparey | Phil Roman | Lorenzo Music | 1991 Emmy nominee. |

== Reception ==
All the Garfield animated specials received Primetime Emmy Award nominations for Outstanding Animated Program, winning four including Garfield on the Town, Garfield in the Rough, Garfield's Halloween Adventure, and Garfield's Babes and Bullets.

== See also ==
- Happy Birthday, Garfield
