= Garfield: His 9 Lives =

1984 anthology book by Jim Davis and 1988 animated television special

- Author: Jim Davis
- Language: English
- Series: Garfield
- Genre: Humor
- Publisher: Ballantine Books
- Publication date: October 12, 1984
- Publication place: United States
- Pages: 128
- ISBN: 978-0345320612
- OCLC: 11361460

Garfield: His 9 Lives
- Title card
- Created by: Jim Davis
- Written by: Jim Davis; David Kuhn ("In the Garden"); Jim Clements ("Space Cat"); George Herriman (uncredited)
- Directed by: Phil Roman; Doug Frankel; Ruth Kissane; Bill Littlejohn; Bob Nesler; Bob Scott; George Singer; John Sparey
- Starring: Lorenzo Music; Thom Huge; Gregg Berger; Desirée Goyette
- Narrated by: Gregg Berger ("Cave Cat")
- Music by: Ed Bogas and Desirée Goyette; Lou Rawls (vocals)
- Country of origin: United States
- Original language: English

Production
- Producer: Phil Roman
- Running time: 48 minutes
- Production companies: Film Roman; United Media; Paws, Inc.

Original release
- Network: CBS
- Release: November 22, 1988

Related
- Happy Birthday, Garfield; Garfield's Babes and Bullets

Garfield: His 9 Lives is a 1984 anthology book that showcase the "nine lives" of Jim Davis' comic strip character Garfield. The book is divided into ten segments, detailing the creation of cats and the lives of Garfield. The book was later adapted into an animated television special in 1988, and a comic book by Boom! Studios from 2014 to 2015.

== Synopsis ==
The book and the special tell stories in various artstyles about Garfield's nine lives and how each life has shaped his personality. Each story is preceded by Garfield explaining the significance of each life. The current incarnation of Garfield is his 8th life, with the final life being set in space.

- "In the Beginning" (written by Jim Davis, illustrated by Paws, Inc. staff): The cat is created by a design team led by God, with them giving it unique traits like always landing on its feet. When the staff question the decision to give it 9 lives, God simply states that he likes cats, revealing his feline eyes.
- "Cave Cat" (written by Jim Davis; illustrated by Davis, Mike Fentz, and Larry Fentz): In the Stone Age, the first cat emerges from the sea and experiences the perils of life on land, such as being domesticated by cavepeople and being unable to catch prey. A giant dinosaur resembling Odie called "Big Bob" attempts to play fetch with it with a giant tree, killing the cat.
- "The Vikings" (written by Jim Davis and Mike Fentz; illustrated by Fentz): A group of Vikings from the year 984, including Garfield the Orange, frozen in an iceberg for a thousand years, thaw out and wake up in a "lovely and warm" 1984 in St. Paul, Minnesota. After failing to pillage the town, they decide to integrate into society, but slowly find it mundane. While bored, Garfield rummages through his old belongings and discovers a petrified weasel, which reverts the Vikings and they run into the forest.
- "Babes and Bullets" (written by Ron Tuthill, illustrated by Kevin Campbell): Presented in the style of a noir serial, Hard-boiled detective Sam Spayed (a play on Sam Spade) investigates the possible murder of Father O'Tabby, a priest and the husband of Tanya O'Tabby. After discovering coffee stains on his shirt in the morgue and learning that O'Tabby was driving to one of the church's parishioners before his death from Father O'Felix, he returns to his office, where his new assistant Kitty accidentally spills coffee on his shirt. Sam suspects that Kitty attempted to kill him, jealous of Tanya's marriage, but she states herself to be innocent. After Kitty mentions that O'Tabby was an insomniac that needed sleeping pills, Sam realizes the true culprit was O'Felix, who drugged O'Tabby's coffee so he could become pastor. He is arrested, and Sam and Kitty celebrate that night.
- "The Exterminators" (written by Jim Davis; illustrated by Davis, Mike Fentz, and Larry Fentz): A trio of Three Stooges-like exterminator cats chase a mouse, and after the three fight over who eats it, they throw it to the old lady who hired them. She finds it delicious and joins the group.
- "Lab Animal" (written by Jim Davis; illustrated by Gary Barker and Larry Fentz): At a secret government facility, lab specimen 19-GB is subjected to various tests for rapid mutation. After hearing that he is to be dissected, he escapes and is subsequently pursued by the military. After jumping in a lake to escape search dogs, he transforms into a dog himself, blending in with the search team as they call off the pursuit.
- "The Garden" (written and illustrated by Dave Kühn): Cloey and her orange kitten play in a magical, Wonderland-like garden, which was built by Cloey's joyful Uncle Tod. Before Tod leaves for the circus, he leaves behind a crystal box on a checkered toadstool, warning them to never open it. The pair resists the temptation, believing that opening the box could harm Uncle Tod, and live happily in the garden forever.
- "Primal Self" (written by Jim Davis; illustrated by Jim Clements, Gary Barker, and Larry Fentz): A housecat named Tigger discovers a shadowy force on a "cold winter's day". When he touches it, he becomes feral and lunges at his elderly owner.
- "Garfield" (written by Jim Davis; illustrated by Gary Barker and Valette Hildebrand; color by Doc Davis): Garfield is born in an Italian restaurant, where he eats several types of pasta and discovers his love for lasagna. The owner gets frustrated with his eating and takes him to a pet shop, where he latches onto and is adopted by Jon Arbuckle. Shortly after, Jon adopts Odie as a playmate, much to Garfield's annoyance. Garfield runs out into the street thinking an ice cream truck is nearby, but Odie pulls him back as a truck passes by. Garfield thanks him for saving his life and swears he will "forever be grateful to you, Odie". Years later, an aged Garfield is recounting the story to some kittens with Odie being the one running to the street, while Odie watches silently in frustration.
- "Space Cat" (written and illustrated by Jim Clements): Garfield is told to simply survive on a spacecraft operated by an artificial intelligence modeled after Odie. He suddenly encounters the Incredibly Huge Galactic War Fleet (IHGWF for short), who threaten to destroy his ship. Garfield fails to set up the weapons in time and is destroyed, where it is revealed he is playing an arcade simulator.

=== Television special ===
The television special premiered on CBS on November 22, 1988, adapting "In the Beginning", "Cave Cat", "The Garden", "Lab Animal", "Garfield", and "Space Cat" as the opening and his first, third, seventh, eighth, and ninth life respectively. 4 new segments and a new ending were created for the special, and the "Babes and Bullets" story was adapted into a standalone special in 1989.

The special was nominated for the Primetime Emmy Award for Outstanding Animated Program, losing to Garfield's Babes and Bullets. Garfield: His 9 Lives was released on VHS on March 3, 1993. The special and Garfield's Babes and Bullets are included on the DVD Garfield's Fantasies, along with Garfield's Feline Fantasies. A second DVD bundled with Garfield in the Rough was released in 2018.

- The opening segment "In the Beginning" (directed by Phil Roman) remains largely unchanged, but God's reasoning for giving cats 9 lives is that it "would make a great plot for a story".
- "King Cat" (directed by Phil Roman and George Singer): In ancient Egypt, cats were worshiped as gods for their ties to the cat goddess Bastet, so King Cat spends his days in luxury as his slave dogs obey his every command. When he learns that he will be buried alive in the pyramid when his dim-witted Pharaoh dies, King Cat takes it upon himself to protect "Junior" from his evil brother's murder attempts. King Cat eventually unwittingly seals his fate when he unintentionally blows "Junior" up and King Cat is sealed in the pyramid, but his slave dog Odie helps him escape. King Cat, swearing to repay the favor, becomes Odie's new slave cat.
- "Court Musician" (directed by Bob Scott): The king demands a concerto from George "Freddie" Handel, and under the pressure of a jester who wants him to fail, he assigns his cat to compose the final movement. The cat's poor writing of the final movement causes Freddie and his quartet to play a jazzy tune for the finale, which satisfies the king.
- "Stunt Cat" (directed by Phil Roman, Bill Littlejohn, and Bob Nelser): Garfield is called upon as a stunt double for a Krazy Kat cartoon and is killed by a load of falling bricks.
- "Diana's Piano" (directed by Doug Frankel): A girl receives a kitten on her eighth birthday, who she names Diana. Diana enjoys listening to the girl play the piano, and sees her grow up. She eventually passes away peacefully on the piano, and the woman recounts the story to a new cat, Patches.
- The segment "Space Cat" (directed by Phil Roman, John Sparey, and Bob Nelser) plays out similarly to the book until the ending. After Garfield and Odie are killed, they meet God, whom they convince to give them 9 more lives due to their unfair circumstances (and because Heaven's computers were down and couldn't track their lives). After Garfield and Odie vanish, God reveals his feline eyes, saying "We have to stick together, you know."

=== Voice cast ===
- Lorenzo Music – Garfield
- Thom Huge – Jon / Caveman #1 / "Junior" / Soldier / Computer
- Gregg Berger – Odie / Jester / Scientist #1: Lab Animal / Narrator for Cave Cat
- Desirée Goyette – Chloe / Sara: Diana's Piano
- Nino Tempo – Luigi / Black Bart
- Hal Smith – George Frideric Handel / Scientist #2 (Larry): Lab Animal
- Sandi Huge – Garfield's Mom: Garfield / Sara's Mom: Diana's Piano
- Carolyn Davis – Old Sara: Diana's Piano
- Frank Welker – Commander Mendelson
- C. Lindsay Workman – God
- Heather Kerr
- Ed Bogas

== Boom! Studios adaptation ==
From 2014 to 2015, Boom! Studios adapted His 9 Lives across four comics (issues #32-36), with each story drawn by a different artist. It can be seen as a hybrid of the book and the special as, like the special, it features several lives created exclusively for it. Garfield's eighth life introduces each life before it begins.

1. "Cave Cat" (art by David DeGrand)
2. "King Cat" (art by Kari Smith)
3. "Pirate Cat" (art by Roger Langridge)
4. "Cowboy Cat" (art by Yehudi Mercado)
5. "Super Cat" (art by Brittney L. Williams)
6. "Babes and Bullets" (art by Andy Hirsch)
7. "Lab Cat" (art by Frazer Irving)
8. "Space Cat" (art by Genevieve FT)
