= A Garfield Christmas =

- Also known as: A Garfield Christmas Special
- Created by: Jim Davis
- Written by: Jim Davis
- Directed by: Phil Roman
- Starring: Thom Huge; Lorenzo Music; David L. Lander; Pat Carroll; Julie Payne; Pat Harrington Jr. Gregg Berger
- Theme music composer: Ed Bogas and Desirée Goyette (music and lyrics); Lou Rawls, Thom Huge, Gregg Berger, Desirée Goyette and Lorenzo Music (vocals)
- Country of origin: United States
- Original language: English

Production
- Producer: Phil Roman
- Running time: 24 minutes
- Production companies: Film Roman; United Media; Paws, Inc.

Original release
- Network: CBS
- Release: December 21, 1987

Related
- Garfield Goes Hollywood; Happy Birthday, Garfield

A Garfield Christmas is a 1987 American animated television special based on the Garfield comic strip, created by Jim Davis. It is directed by Phil Roman and stars Lorenzo Music as the voice of Garfield the house cat, as well as Thom Huge, Gregg Berger, Julie Payne, Pat Harrington Jr., David L. Lander and Pat Carroll. The special is about Garfield spending Christmas with the Arbuckle family on their Indiana farm outside their hometown of Muncie, and discovering the true meaning of Christmas.

Davis, who wrote the teleplay, cited it as semi-autobiographical. The special was first broadcast on December 21, 1987, on CBS and was often rebroadcast in subsequent years until its final airing on December 14, 2000. It was nominated for the Primetime Emmy Award for Outstanding Animated Program and has been released on DVD.

This was the seventh of twelve Garfield television specials made between 1982 and 1991. It was also the last special to air prior to Garfield and Friends, which premiered nine months later on September 17, 1988.

== Plot ==
Jon Arbuckle wakes up Garfield on Christmas Eve morning, telling him that they are going to the countryside to celebrate Christmas with the Arbuckle family on their farm. Garfield is annoyed that they always go to the farm and the family never comes to Jon's house. During his drive to his family's farm, Jon talks about Christmases he had when he was a boy, with his parents, brother Doc Boy, and Grandma, while Garfield listens with great cynicism.

Upon arriving, Grandma and Garfield quickly grow a special bond. While Jon, Garfield, and Odie take a walk, Grandma spikes Mom's sausage gravy with chili powder. Jon and Garfield return for dinner, while Odie works on something secretive and then sneaks back into the house. After dinner, they decorate the Christmas tree. Jon asks Garfield to put the star on, as no one else can reach the top of the tree. As the family sings Christmas songs, Garfield finds Grandma sitting alone; she reminisces about her husband, recalls how he used to provide for her and the family before his death, and laments that Christmas is when she misses him most.

Dad, with great reluctance, reads Binky, the Clown Who Saved Christmas to an eager Jon and Doc Boy. At night, Garfield notices Odie's suspicious activity and follows him to the barn, seeing Odie making something out of seemingly random implements. While there, Garfield stumbles upon a cache of letters that he concludes must be at least 50 years old.

On Christmas morning, after the family opens their presents, Garfield gives Grandma the letters he found in the barn. These letters were love notes written to Grandma by her husband from when they first met each other and married. Garfield also finds out that Odie has been busy making his ultimate Christmas gift: a homemade back scratcher. Garfield gladly thanks and embraces Odie for the gift he made. This is a rare glimpse at Garfield's softer side, as Garfield learns one of the true meanings of Christmas: "It's not the giving, it's not the getting, it's the loving! There, I said it. Now get outta here."

== Voice cast ==
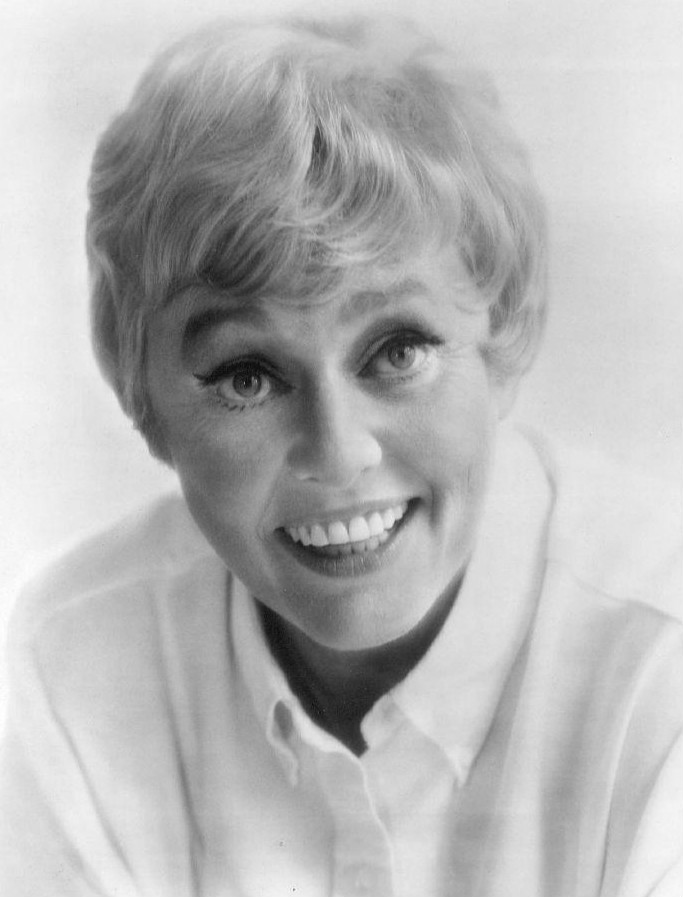
Pat Carroll voiced Grandma Arbuckle.

- Thom Huge as Jon Arbuckle
- Lorenzo Music as Garfield
- David Lander as Doc Boy Arbuckle, Jon's younger brother
- Pat Carroll as Grandma Arbuckle, Jon's paternal grandmother
- Pat Harrington and Julie Payne as Dad and Mom Arbuckle, Jon's parents
- Gregg Berger as Odie

== Songs ==
- "Gimme, Gimme, Gimme, Gimme" performed by Lou Rawls
- "Can't Wait Till Christmas" performed by Thom Huge, Lorenzo Music, and Gregg Berger
- "O Christmas Tree" performed by Pat Carroll
- "Christmas in Your Heart" performed by ensemble and Desirée Goyette
- "You Can Never Find an Elf When You Need One" performed by Lou Rawls and Desirée Goyette
- "A Good Old-Fashioned Christmas" (ending song) performed by ensemble

"Here Comes Garfield" from the special of the same name can be heard instrumentally when Jon wakes up Garfield from his dream.

== Production ==
In writing the teleplay, Davis based it on experiences he had celebrating Christmas with his family on their farm in Indiana, with many Arbuckles modeled after Davis family members. Davis' real-life brother was known as Doc Boy. Davis referred to the story as "very autobiographical", adding "That was my Christmas on the farm". However, he noted Grandma was an entirely fictional character, added for the emotional subplot of having time with loved ones at Christmas.

Lorenzo Music, Thom Huge and Gregg Berger reprise their respective roles from past films as Garfield, Jon Arbuckle, and Odie. Julie Payne and Pat Harrington Jr. voice Jon's mother and father, while David L. Lander voices Jon's brother, Doc Boy. Grandma was voiced by Pat Carroll, who at the time was becoming increasingly popular in voice work. After the 1970s, she was working on Legends of the Superheroes and Pound Puppies.

== Broadcast and release ==
The special first aired on December 21, 1987. According to Bustle, the special was rebroadcast every year until 2000. It often played along with the 1965 Peanuts special A Charlie Brown Christmas.

The home video version reanimates some scenes, including the part where Grandma talks to Garfield about her late husband. In addition to using a different animation style, the altered scene shows a picture of the husband, which was not present in the broadcast.

In 2004, A Garfield Christmas was released on the DVD Garfield Holiday Celebrations, along with Garfield's Halloween Adventure and Garfield's Thanksgiving. It appeared 23rd in TV DVD sales for the week of November 10, 2007. In 2014, Entertainment Weekly reported copies of the DVD "were selling on eBay like rare collector's items". Garfield holiday-themed specials, including A Garfield Christmas, were also receiving millions of views on the website YouTube. It was consequently re-released on another DVD compilation, The Garfield Holiday Collection, on November 4, 2014, sold only by Walmart, and was also made available for digital download on November 11 that year.

== Reception ==
The special was nominated for the Primetime Emmy Award for Outstanding Animated Program at the 40th Primetime Emmy Awards.

In 2004, TV Guide ranked the special 10th on its 10 Best Family Holiday Specials list. In 2013, Scott Neumyer of Parade called it "a delightful little short featuring everyone's favorite cantankerous orange cat". That year, Jef Rouner of the Houston Press described the episode as "depressing" and mostly unfunny, remarking that since Grandma cannot hear Garfield's thoughts, "what we're watching is a sad old widow so desperately lonely without her late husband that she has begun talking out loud to a visiting cat". In 2014, Johnny Brayson of Bustle called it "a bona fide classic".

== See also ==
- List of Christmas films
