= Garfield: Big Fat Hairy Deal =

1987 video game

- Amstrad CPC cover art
- Developer: The Edge
- Publisher: The Edge
- Designer: Stephen Cargill
- Composers: David Whittaker (Amiga/Atari ST); Neil Baldwin (C64)
- Series: Garfield
- Platforms: Amiga, Amstrad CPC, Atari ST, Commodore 64, ZX Spectrum
- Release: EU: 1987
- Genre: Platform
- Mode: Single player

Garfield: Big Fat Hairy Deal is a 1987 computer game for the Atari ST, ZX Spectrum, Commodore 64, Amstrad CPC and the Amiga based on the comic strip Garfield. It is the second video game based on Jim Davis' Garfield comics to be released, following 1986's Create with Garfield.

== Plot and gameplay ==
Garfield must rescue his girlfriend Arlene from the cat pound and then return to Jon Arbuckle's map. He starts his quest in Jon's house, venturing through streets, dark alleys, convalescent homes, and sanitary sewers to find Arlene. Various objects are littered along the way, and Garfield meets characters such as Odie, Nermal and giant rats, whom can help or hinder his quest.

In some versions of this game, the background graphics are only in black and white, while the sprites show a little color. In other versions (i.e. the Commodore 64 version), the graphics are all full color.

== Reception ==
Reception

Review scores
Publication	Score			
Publication	Amiga	Atari ST	C64	ZX
Computer and Video Games	N/A	N/A	7/10	N/A
Your Sinclair	N/A	N/A	N/A	7/10
Zzap!64	60%	N/A	79%	N/A
Atari ST User	N/A	8/10	N/A	N/A
The One	74%	74%	N/A	N/A

Awards
Publication	Award
Crash	Crash Smash
Sinclair User	SU Classic

Zzap!64 reviewing the C64 version complemented the graphics, particularly the characters, calling them "Large, beautifully animated", but criticised the repetitive level design and lack of replay value.

Nic Outterside, writing in Atari ST User, found that the game had "you in stitches of laughter", employed "suburb graphics and animation", was "a delight to play", and thought it was one of the most enjoyable games he had played in 1988.
