= Garfield's Babes and Bullets =

1989 American TV special

- Title card
- Created by: Jim Davis
- Based on: Garfield's Babes and Bullets by Ron Tuthill
- Written by: Jim Davis
- Directed by: Phil Roman
- Starring: Lorenzo Music; Thom Huge; Gregg Berger; Desirée Goyette; Julie Payne; Lindsay Workman; Nino Tempo
- Narrated by: Lorenzo Music
- Theme music composer: Desirée Goyette and Ed Bogas (music and lyrics); Lou Rawls (vocals)
- Country of origin: United States

Production
- Executive producer: Phil Roman
- Producer: George Singer
- Editors: Sam Horta (supervisor); Tim Borquez; Mike Gollum; Julie Gustafson; Brian Mars
- Running time: 24 minutes
- Production companies: Film Roman; United Media; Paws, Inc.

Original release
- Network: CBS
- Release: May 23, 1989

Related
- Garfield: His 9 Lives; Garfield's Thanksgiving

Garfield's Babes and Bullets is a 1989 animated television special directed by Phil Roman. It is based on a short story of the same name by Ron Tuthill in the book Garfield: His 9 Lives. It features Lorenzo Music as the voice of Garfield, the house cat, re-imagined as a private detective named Sam Spayed attempting to solve a murder mystery.

The special won the Primetime Emmy Award for Outstanding Animated Program (One Hour or Less). It has since been released on DVD.

This was the ninth of twelve Garfield television specials made between 1982 and 1991.

== Plot ==
Feeling bored, Garfield looks into a closet and finds a trenchcoat and fedora. Donning both, he begins to fantasize he is Sam Spayed, a second-rate private investigator in a film noir atmosphere. Sam receives a visit from Tanya O'Tabby, a beautiful woman who hires Sam to investigate the death of her husband, Professor O'Tabby, who apparently drove off a clifftop road. Tanya believes it was murder, as her husband was an excellent driver, but the death was ruled as a simple car accident. Despite initially suspecting foul play (that Tanya killed her husband either for his money or because he was unfaithful), Sam agrees to take the case.

No solid proof of murder comes to light when Sam visits the morgue, although he notes that O'Tabby's shirt, chest and stomach hairs have yellowish-brown stains on them and secretly pockets a mysterious, painted "stone" that the coroner overlooked. Next, Sam goes to the university where O'Tabby worked and meets the late man's colleague and former advisor Professor O'Felix. He tells Sam how O'Tabby was on his way to visit an elderly benefactress the night he died, but dismisses Sam's idea that the professor was having an affair, saying his one weakness was instead a coffee addiction.

Sam phones Tanya to tell her what he knows so far, only for his newly-hired secretary Kitty to spill coffee on him when he mentions talking to O'Felix about O'Tabby's "woman trouble". While cleaning himself up, Sam realizes that the "stone" is actually a ceramic fragment from a broken coffee mug and the stains on the late professor's clothing and body must have been coffee. He deduces that Kitty worked for O'Tabby before she came to Sam's office, and accuses Kitty of O'Tabby's murder, believing her motive was that she loved O'Tabby but the professor didn't love her. Kitty breaks down into tears, insisting that she did not kill the professor, having simply left the university out of being unable to bear not having him. She also explains that she did more than make coffee for O'Tabby, also filling his prescriptions for potent sleeping pills to counter his coffee-induced insomnia.

Deducing O'Felix is the murderer, Sam brings him to court. O'Felix was jealous of his former student's success and, having had his eyes on O'Tabby's position within the university for some time, murdered him by spiking his coffee with some sleeping pills, causing O'Tabby to fall asleep at the wheel and drive off the cliff to his death. Tanya visits Sam one last time, making it very clear that the romance he had hoped to have with her will never happen. Kitty starts to seduce Sam, only for reality to intrude via owner Jon Arbuckle asking Garfield what he's doing in the closet. Garfield responds to Jon: "Gettin' ready to roll the credits, pal!", breaking the fourth wall, and goes back in the closet, continuing his fantasy.

== Cast ==
- Lorenzo Music - Garfield / Sam Spayed the detective
- Thom Huge - Jon Arbuckle, Landlord
- Gregg Berger - Odie, Burt Fleebish the coroner
- Desirée Goyette - Tanya
- Julie Payne - Kitty the secretary
- Nino Tempo - Lt. Washington the cop
- C. Lindsay Workman - O'Felix
- Lou Rawls - Singing voice

== Production ==
Garfield: His 9 Lives was published by Ballantine Books under the Garfield franchise in 1984, with creator Jim Davis writing he and his staff wrote the book to explore the character beyond what could be achieved in the comic strip. Ron Tuthill wrote the "Babes and Bullets: The Continuing Adventures of Sam Spayed" chapter, illustrated by Kevin Campbell. Film noir parodies were popular in films, with Sam Spayed and Tracer Bullet in Calvin and Hobbes marking the parody's crossover to comic strips.

The television adaptation was written by Davis. It was directed and produced by Phil Roman under his company, Film Roman.

== Broadcast and release ==
After the airing of the initial animated Garfield: His 9 Lives special on November 22, 1988, Garfield's Babes and Bullets aired on May 23, 1989. It played on prime time on CBS.

The special was included on the DVD Garfield Fantasies, released in May 2005. It was featured along with the specials Garfield: His 9 Lives and Garfield's Feline Fantasies (1990).

== Reception ==
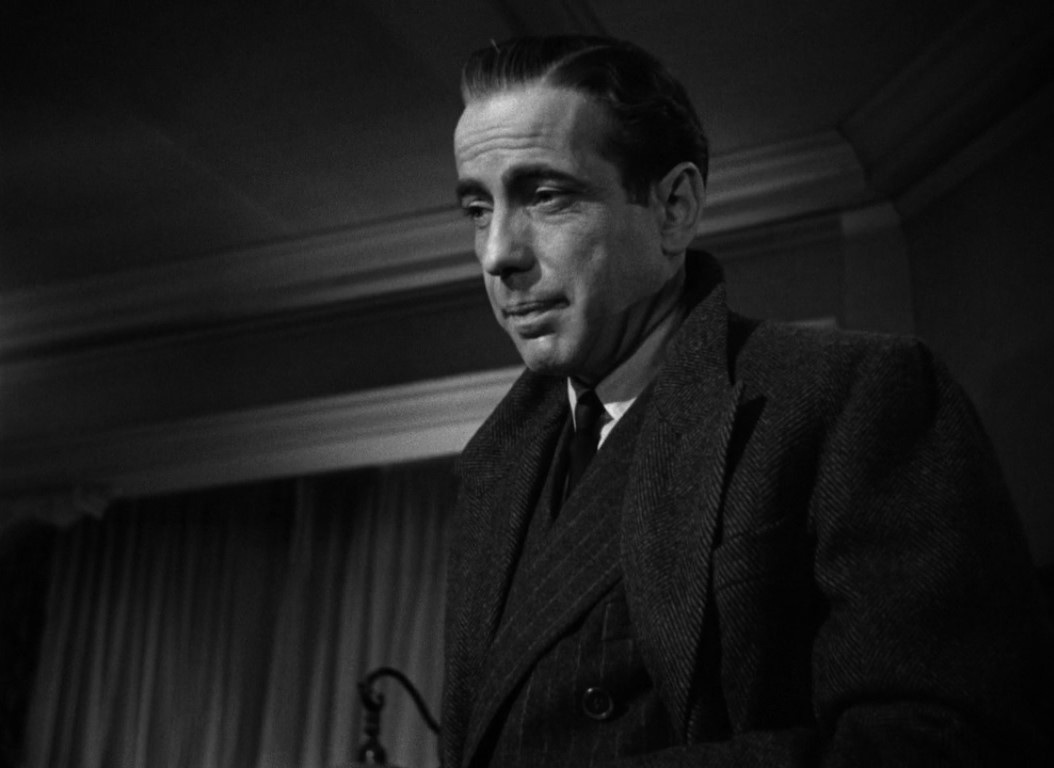
Humphrey Bogart as Sam Spade, the inspiration for the Garfield character.

The special won the Primetime Emmy Award for Outstanding Animated Program (One Hour or Less) in 1989. The animated version of Garfield: His 9 Lives was also nominated that year.

In his DVD Talk review, Randy Miller III called Garfield Fantasies the most unusual of the Garfield DVD collections, adding Babes and Bullets "ain't exactly Sin City here, but this amusing caper is one of the best of the bunch." Author Mitzi M. Brunsdale described Sam Spayed as one of the "strange spinoffs" of the Sam Spade character, created by Dashiell Hammett in the novel The Maltese Falcon. Turner Classic Movies identified Sam Spayed particularly as a parody of 1940s film detectives and Humphrey Bogart, who starred as Spade in the 1941 film version of The Maltese Falcon.
