= Garfield's Thanksgiving =

1989 Garfield TV special

- The title
- Created by: Jim Davis
- Written by: Jim Davis; Kim Campbell
- Directed by: Phil Roman
- Starring: Thom Huge; Lorenzo Music; Julie Payne; Gregg Berger; Pat Carroll
- Theme music composer: Ed Bogas and Desirée Goyette (music and lyrics); Lou Rawls and Desirée Goyette (vocals)
- Country of origin: United States
- Original language: English

Production
- Producer: Phil Roman
- Running time: 24 minutes
- Production companies: Film Roman; United Media; Paws, Inc.

Original release
- Network: CBS
- Release: November 22, 1989

Related
- Garfield's Babes and Bullets; Garfield's Feline Fantasies

Garfield's Thanksgiving is a 1989 American animated television special based on the Garfield comic strip. It once again featured Lorenzo Music as the voice of Garfield. The special was first broadcast on November 22, 1989, on CBS and was nominated for Outstanding Animated Program at the 42nd Primetime Emmy Awards. The events of the special take place during the second season of Garfield and Friends. It has been released on both VHS and DVD home video. On overseas DVD copies of Garfield's Holiday Celebrations, this special is replaced with Garfield in the Rough.

This was the tenth of twelve Garfield television specials made between 1982 and 1991.

== Plot ==
Garfield checks the calendar date one morning and discovers that he has an appointment with the vet that day. When he removes the date hoping to make Jon forget, he notices that tomorrow is Thanksgiving and instantly demands Jon to buy the food for Thanksgiving dinner. Jon Arbuckle agrees, but takes Garfield to the vet on the way home from the supermarket, making him panic.

While at the vet, Dr. Liz Wilson examines Garfield, while Jon tries to talk her into going out on a date with him. Liz reports Garfield is "healthy as a horse" but, out of concern for his weight, is putting the cat on a strict diet, to Garfield's dismay. Jon threatens to suffocate his way through the rest of the visit until Liz says she will go out with him. When Garfield and Jon simultaneously faint, an exasperated Liz agrees to the date out of annoyance, and Jon invites her to his house for Thanksgiving dinner.

Back home, Jon is excited that Liz is coming over, but Garfield is absolutely miserable at being put on a diet. After eating half a leaf of lettuce for lunch, Garfield tries to raid the refrigerator but is prevented by Odie, whom Jon has assigned to make sure the cat himself does not try to cheat on his diet. Later, Garfield weighs himself on his talking weight scale and destroys it for comparing him to Orson Welles, and is repeatedly foiled by Odie when he tries to steal cookies, flour, salt and sugar. Garfield then wonders if the lack of food is making him hallucinate.

The next morning, Garfield is even grumpier than usual, but Jon pays him no mind as he begins preparing the Thanksgiving meal. However, Jon does not have a clue how to prepare such a dinner; he forgets to thaw the turkey or leave enough time to thoroughly cook it and thus tries to compensate by raising the oven's temperature from 325 to 500 degrees Fahrenheit, ignores the stuffing, rubs butter on his own skin when told to "rub skin with butter", and throws all the vegetables into a single pot of water on the stove (which Garfield attempts to sabotage by adding garlic powder). Jon shaves and picks a suit, just in time for Liz to arrive and notice he is not wearing pants. As Jon leaves to check on the meal, Liz spends some time with Garfield, casually listing some of the symptoms of excess dieting, some of which he experiences (like irritability and fatigue) and others he obviously fakes (such as dementia and twitches). She concludes that since Garfield is otherwise healthy, he instead may only need some light exercise, strongly pleasing the feline.

In the kitchen, Jon is faced with a still frozen turkey and admits defeat in his attempt to cook dinner. Garfield manages to convince Jon to call Grandma, who arrives seconds later and shoos Jon out of the kitchen. As Jon distracts Liz by giving her a history lesson about Thanksgiving (and Liz dozes off), Grandma proceeds to cook the meal: she cuts the still-frozen turkey into slices with a chainsaw, adds white sauce then batters and deep fries the slices into croquettes, after which she prepares sweet potatoes by covering them with butter, brown sugar and marshmallows, finishing with "split-second cranberry sauce" (from the can) and pumpkin pie. Once everything is ready, Grandma tells Garfield that Liz could not have found a better man than Jon and that she had better not blow it, then asks Garfield to eat a piece of pie for her as she leaves.

Garfield tells Jon and Liz that everything is ready, and they all proceed into the dining room to eat. Afterwards, Liz declares that it was a wonderful meal and agrees to come back next year, then thanks Jon for inviting her with a kiss on the cheek. Once Liz leaves, Jon, Garfield and Odie declare it was a great day and they are thankful for Grandma. They decide to head out for a walk to work off the meal, but Odie is too bloated from overeating to get off the couch. Jon immediately puts Odie on a diet, and Garfield assumes the persona of a drill sergeant and gleefully torments Odie into doing push-ups as payback for yesterday.

== Voice cast ==
- Thom Huge as Jon Arbuckle
- Lorenzo Music as Garfield
- Julie Payne as Dr. Liz Wilson
- Gregg Berger as Odie
- Pat Carroll as Grandma

== Songs ==
- "Make Thanksgiving One Whole Meal" by Lou Rawls
- "It's a Quiet Celebration" by Desirée Goyette

== Book adaptation ==
The book adaptation, which retains the original title "Garfield's Thanksgiving," deviates in the following ways:

- Odie and the scale are not involved in Garfield's torment, and Jon – too deliriously happy about having Liz over for Thanksgiving dinner – is ignorant to the fact that Garfield is in misery. Garfield is also weak and suffers from insomnia, resulting in a sleepless night.
- Garfield does more and even worse things to sabotage Jon as payback for not being able to enjoy the meal, adding dish detergent to the vegetables and salt to the pumpkin pie, slyly adding with the latter that "the Devil is making (him) do this." When Garfield sees the ruined food after he is taken off the diet, he declares, "What have I done?"
- More of Jon's ruined Thanksgiving dinner is shown. In the end, the turkey did not thaw, the sabotaged vegetables are bubbling from the detergent, and the pie he made is burnt. Jon is also the one to decide to call Grandma without needing Garfield to offer the idea.
- At the end, there is no mention of any new diets. Odie and Garfield simply sit comfortably with their full bellies, and as Jon sees Liz out the door, the three agree unanimously that they have Grandma to thank.

== Production ==
- Created by Jim Davis
- Written by Jim Davis and Kim Campbell
- Original Music by Ed Bogas and Desirée Goyette
- Produced and directed by Phil Roman
- Recording Engineer Gary Clayton
