= Create with Garfield =

1986 video game

Create with Garfield!
- Title screen
- Developer: Ahead Designs
- Publisher: Development Learning Materials
- Series: Garfield
- Platforms: Apple II, Commodore 64, MS-DOS
- Release: Original: 1986; Deluxe: 1987
- Genre: Educational
- Mode: Single-player

Create with Garfield is a 1986 educational video game based on Jim Davis' Garfield comic strip, developed by Ahead Designs and published by Development Learning Materials. It was released for Apple II, Commodore 64, and MS-DOS. A deluxe edition was released in 1987; it featured two disks (one containing additional character and prop sprites), improved printer drivers and a shortcut for returning to a previous screen. A companion disk was released in 1989.

== Gameplay ==
The game allows players to make Garfield cartoons with pieces of artwork featuring characters, props, backgrounds, and text. The game functions with a drag-and-drop system used by a keyboard, mouse or joystick. Cartoons can be printed and/or saved to disk.

== Reception ==
Eric Holroyd, in a review for the Australian Apple Review, recommended the game for Garfield fans, especially if mixed with the similar game Teddy Bear-rels of Fun, claiming that "The added bonus of mixing and matching the two will give endless hours of fun for you, your family and your friends". Neil Randall, writing in Compute!'s Gazette, highly recommended the software for those who enjoyed "creativity programs". He complemented the program as "useful and fun" and thought it "impressive for its ability to get the user creating shortly after boot-up".
