= Garfield's Feline Fantasies =

1990 American TV special

- The Title
- Created by: Jim Davis
- Directed by: Phil Roman
- Starring: Lorenzo Music; Thom Huge; Gregg Berger; Julie Payne; Frank Welker
- Composers: David Benoit and Desirée Goyette
- Country of origin: United States
- Original language: English

Production
- Producer: Phil Roman
- Editors: Timothy J. Borquez; Brian F. Mars
- Running time: 24 minutes
- Production companies: Film Roman; United Media/Mendelson; Paws, Inc.

Original release
- Network: CBS
- Release: May 18, 1990

Related
- Garfield's Thanksgiving; Garfield Gets a Life

Garfield's Feline Fantasies is a 1990 American animated television special based on the Garfield comic strip and is produced by Film Roman, United Media/Mendelson, and Paws, Inc. It once again featured Lorenzo Music as the voice of Garfield. The animated short was first broadcast on May 18, 1990, on CBS and September 10, 1991, on CITV and was nominated for Outstanding Animated Program at the 42nd Primetime Emmy Awards. The events of the special take place between the second and third seasons of Garfield and Friends. It has been released on both VHS and DVD home video.

This was the eleventh of twelve Garfield animated television shorts made between 1985 and 1992. This is the only Garfield animated television short not to feature Lou Rawls.

== Storyline ==
Garfield's fantasy life is beginning to take over his real life, in a Walter Mitty-esque fashion. He slips into a fantasy world at any moment, sometimes without warning, and most are threatening. In one of these fantasies, which composes the bulk of the special, he is Lance Sterling, a mix of James Bond and Indiana Jones. With his associate Slobberjob (Odie, who Garfield brought into the fantasy with him), he travels to exotic locations like Istanbul, Paris, and the Amazon rainforest to find "The Banana of Bombay," and lay claim to it before his enemy "Fat Guy" gets to it first. On the way they meet a mysterious Moldavian lady named Nadia, who has an agenda of her own.

== Plot ==
Garfield is dreaming about being a submarine captain with Pooky as his commanding officer. When Garfield's alarm clock wakes him up, Garfield continues the dream's storyline and fires a torpedo (smashes the alarm clock). Enjoying this, Garfield enters a cowboy fantasy when greeting Odie for the morning and a magician fantasy when waking up Jon to make them breakfast. Odie joins him in the latter fantasy.

Garfield tells Odie their fantasies are not dangerous as Jon is always there to bail them out. They test this theory by entering a fantasy where they are jet pilots of a plane with faulty engines. When Jon saves them from falling, they decide the theory is correct and climb into the refrigerator, entering another fantasy.

In the fantasy, Garfield is Lance Sterling, a James-Bond-meets-Indiana-Jones figure, and Odie is Slobberjob, his bodyguard. The two travel to Istanbul and meet a villain named Fat Guy and his bodyguard Rameet. It is revealed Lance Sterling and Slobberjob have been sent to find the Banana of Bombay, the first banana used in the banana-peel gag. However, it disappeared years ago, and the holy ankh which contained a map to find it was split in half. Fat Guy explains he wants to sell the Banana to whichever country pays the most for it. Lance Sterling insults Fat Guy before agreeing to unite his half of the holy ankh with Fat Guy's. However, Lane Sterling steals Fat Guy's half of the ankh before escaping with Slobberjob. When Fat Guy's henchmen pursue them, a woman named Nadia distracts the henchmen so the protagonists can escape. She claims Lance Sterling and Slobberjob's employers sent her to protect them, but Lance Sterling says they don't need the help and tells her to leave.

Lance Sterling and Slobberjob combine the holy ankh pieces with a supercomputer and discover the ankh's map does not point to the Banana of Bombay, but a clue to the Banana's true location. They travel to Paris, and meet Nadia again after a humorous misunderstanding with a French waiter. She tells them Fat Guy and Rameet are tracking them, and after Slobberjob attempts to take on Rameet, he is thrown at an awning and discovers a map to the Banana of Bombay.

Arriving in the Amazon rainforest, Lance Sterling and Slobberjob enter a temple holding the Banana of Bombay. They discover the Banana on a pillar in the middle of a pool of lava, but it is taken by Nadia. She explains she is from Moldavia, which is a poor country, so the Moldavian government has decided to invest in tourism and they need the Banana to open a fruit stand. Fat Guy and Rameet take the banana and trap Lance Sterling, Nadia, and Slobberjob on the pillar. Rameet falls in the lava, and Slobberjob manages to get everyone off the pillar. A group of monkeys steal the Banana of Bombay from Fat Guy, but Lance Sterling and Slobberjob obtain the Banana and flee the temple, pursued by Fat Guy, Nadia, and the monkeys. They are cornered at a cliff, but use the Banana to slip all their adversaries and make them fall into a river. Rameet, who survived falling into the lava, confronts them, and they are forced to jump off the cliff.

Ending the fantasy, Garfield and Odie fall out of the refrigerator. When Jon asks Garfield if he had another fantasy, Garfield states it was his last one, only to enter another fantasy that mirrors Casablanca.

== Cast ==
- Lorenzo Music - Garfield / Lance Sterling
- Gregg Berger - Waiter
- Thom Huge - Jon Arbuckle
- Julie Payne - Nadia
- Frank Welker - Fat Guy, Rameet
