= Garfield in Paradise =

- Title card
- Created by: Jim Davis
- Written by: Jim Davis
- Directed by: Phil Roman
- Starring: Lorenzo Music; Thom Huge; Gregg Berger; Frank Nelson; Wolfman Jack; Hal Smith; Desirée Goyette; Julie Payne; Nino Tempo
- Theme music composer: Ed Bogas and Desirée Goyette (music and lyrics); Desirée Goyette, Lou Rawls, Lorenzo Music and Thom Huge (vocals)
- Country of origin: United States
- Original language: English

Production
- Executive producer: Jay Poynor
- Producer: Phil Roman
- Editors: Sam Horta; Mark R. Crookston; Timothy J. Borquez
- Running time: 24 minutes
- Production companies: Film Roman; United Media Productions

Original release
- Network: CBS
- Release: May 27, 1986

Related
- Garfield's Halloween Adventure; Garfield Goes Hollywood

Garfield in Paradise is a 1986 American animated television special directed by Phil Roman, based on the Garfield comic strip by Jim Davis. It features Lorenzo Music as the voice of Garfield the house cat, other regulars Thom Huge and Gregg Berger, and guest star Wolfman Jack. It originally aired on CBS on May 27, 1986.

This was the fifth of twelve Garfield television specials made between 1982 and 1991. The story concerns the characters visiting a tropical vacation destination. The special was nominated for the Primetime Emmy Award for Outstanding Animated Program and has been released on DVD.

== Plot ==
Jon Arbuckle and Garfield take their third class airline trip to Paradise World, a cheapskate's version of Hawaii. When they arrive on the island, Jon and Garfield check in at a run-down motel and are soon disappointed to find out that there is no beach within sight, and only an empty swimming pool in the back instead. When Jon and Garfield enter their room, they find Odie hiding in their luggage. None of the trio has any fun until they plan to rent a car and search for a beach around the island. For a cheap price, they get a Chevrolet Bel Air in pristine condition. They hit the beach and later decide where to go next when their car mysteriously speeds into a jungle on its own, stopping in the middle of a native village. Jon, Garfield, and Odie presume that they are in trouble until the natives begin kowtowing to their car. They meet the tribal chief (The High Ramma-Lamma), who explains that the villagers (The Ding-Dongs) learned English "from watching a lot of beach movies". In 1957, the Cruiser, a James Dean/Fonzie-styled legend, drove his car into the village and introduced the people to the 1950s pop culture. The Cruiser eventually saved the village by sacrificing himself and driving his car into a nearby volcano to prevent it from erupting. The village is dedicated to a 1950s lifestyle and believes that Jon's rental car is actually the same one the Cruiser owned.

In the village, Jon and Garfield find romance with the tribal princess, Owooda, and her cat, Mai-Tai. Meanwhile, the chief orders the village idiot, Monkey, to fix the car with Odie's assistance. Suddenly, the volcano begins to erupt and Owooda tells Jon that she and Mai-Tai must sacrifice themselves to save the village. However, the volcano rejects Owooda and Mai-Tai, and the village shaman, Pigeon, interprets that it wants the car instead and, if it does not have the car within thirty seconds, it will blow the island to pieces. Monkey and Odie make their last attempt to get the car fixed, which still does not work until Odie successfully taps the distributor cap with a hammer. The car finally starts and zooms through the village and up the volcano with Monkey driving and Odie hanging onto the hood. The car plummets into the crater, the volcano finally erupts, and the Cruiser's spirit and car's ghost drift out, speed off, and vanish into the night sky; the volcano is now at peace. Monkey and Odie are presumed dead until they climb out of the crater unharmed, and the two did come back alive somehow. Jon, Garfield, and the villagers finally carry Monkey and Odie back to the village in a triumph.

== Voice cast ==
- Lorenzo Music as Garfield
- Thom Huge as Jon Arbuckle
- Gregg Berger as Odie/Pigeon
- Wolfman Jack as the Chief
- Frank Nelson as Hotel Clerk/Salesman
- Desirée Goyette as Owooda
- Julie Payne as Mai-Tai/Stewardess
- Nino Tempo as Monkey
- Carolyn Davis as Female Cat
- Hal Smith as Off-screen voice

== Songs ==
- "Inversion Layer Airlines Jingle" performed by Desirée Goyette
- "Hello, Hawaii (Can I Come Over?)" performed by Lou Rawls and Desirée Goyette
- "Beauty and the Beach" performed by Lou Rawls, Thom Huge, and Lorenzo Music
- "When I Saw You" performed by Thom Huge and Desirée Goyette

== Production ==
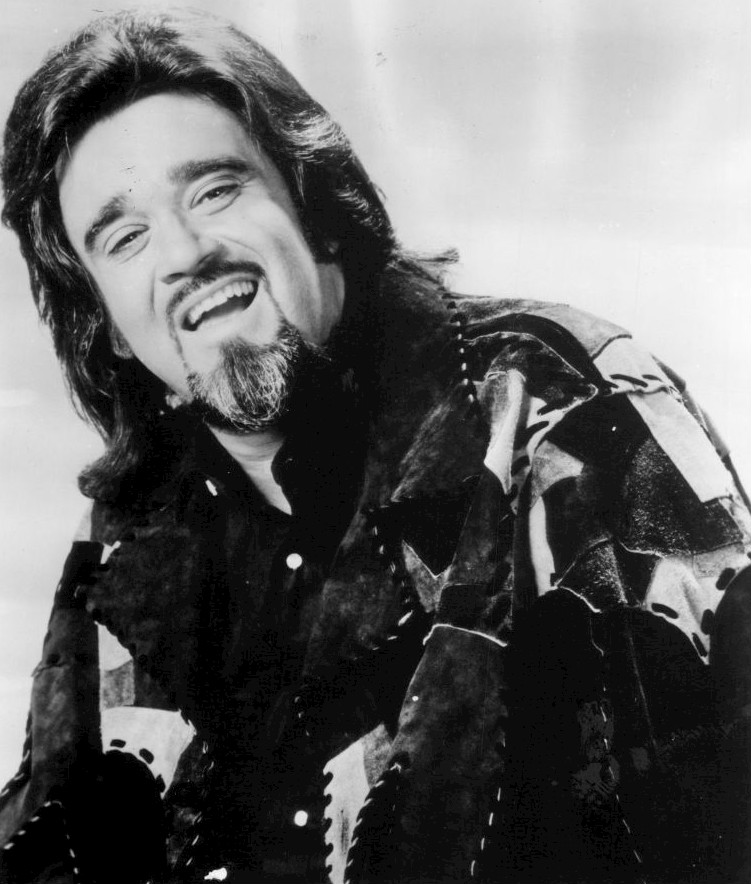
Disc jockey Wolfman Jack guest starred in the special.

The special guest stars disc jockey Wolfman Jack as the tribal chief. Creator Jim Davis was excited to work with Jack on the special, explaining, "It was just way fun. We did it for silliness." This was the final credit for Frank Nelson, who, once again, portrayed a variation on his recurring character from The Jack Benny Program.

== Broadcast and release ==
The special first aired on May 27, 1986, at prime time on CBS. It was aired again in subsequent years. An illustrated children's book adaptation was published by Ballantine Books in 1986.

In February 2005, the special was included on the DVD Garfield Travel Adventures along with the specials Garfield in the Rough (1984) and Garfield Goes Hollywood (1987). It was released on another DVD compilation, The Garfield Holiday Collection, on November 4, 2014, sold only by Walmart, and was also made available for digital download on November 11 that year.

== Reception ==
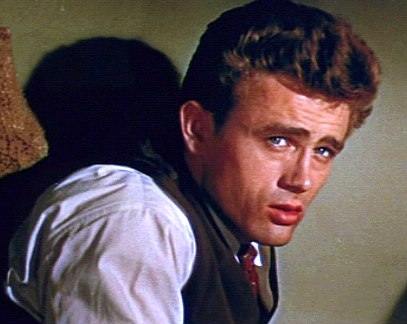
The special features a character reminiscent of James Dean.

The special was nominated for the Primetime Emmy Award for Outstanding Animated Program in 1986. The only other nominee was another Garfield special, Garfield's Halloween Adventure, which won.

In his 2005 DVD Talk review, Randy Miller III complimented the special on "memorable characters" specifically the James Dean doppelganger and Wolfman Jack's character, concluding, "Plus, Jon gets some action." In 2008, Dan Walsh, creator of the website Garfield Minus Garfield recalled watching the specials and claimed, "I can still do a perfect rendition of 'Hello Hawaii,' from Garfield in Paradise." In 2014, Jim Davis identified Garfield in Paradise as "absolutely one of my favorites. It's bright, funny, [there's] rock n' roll in it."
