= Desirée Goyette =

American singer

- Genres: Pop; film score; big beat; electronic; trip hop; opera; jazz
- Occupations: Singer; composer; lyricist; voice actress
- Instruments: Vocals; piano; violin
- Years active: 1980–present
- Label: Lightchild Publishing
- Website: lightchild.com

Desirée Goyette-Bogas (née Goyette) is an American singer, composer, lyricist and voice-over artist. She has been nominated for two Grammy Awards and has voiced such characters as Betty Boop, Barbie, Nermal, Petunia Pig, Honey Bunny and numerous others for radio, television and toys.

== Biography ==
Desirée Goyette graduated from the San Francisco Conservatory of Music and also studied at San Jose State University in the music department. She lived in Los Angeles for numerous years and wed her second husband, producer of Peanuts and Garfield TV specials, Lee Mendelson. After many years together, they then separated and divorced. Around 1993, Goyette married fellow Peanuts and Garfield music contributor Ed Bogas, to whom she is still married to and whom she had twins named Benjamin and Lily (born 2001).

On the first three seasons of Garfield and Friends, Goyette co-wrote all of her songs for the Garfield segments with future husband Ed Bogas. She also contributed her voice to several songs and characters on the show, most notably Nermal. She also teamed with Joey Scarbury for the song, "Flashbeagle" for It's Flashbeagle, Charlie Brown. Goyette writes and records inspirational albums with her company Lightchild Publishing. Three of her works—"I am the Lord" (based on Isaiah 45:5–6), a new setting of Mary Baker Eddy's Communion Hymn, and an arrangement of the South African folk hymn Siyahamba—are included in the 2008 Christian Science Hymnal Supplement.

== Works ==
=== Television ===
- Lou Rawls Parade of Stars (1980) as herself
- No Man's Valley (1981): voice of Pat the Passenger Pigeon
- The New You Asked for It Show (1981): co-host with Rich Little
- Here Comes Garfield (1982): composer, singer
- It's an Adventure, Charlie Brown (1983): composer
- Garfield on the Town (1983): composer, singer, voice of Girl Cat 1
- The Charlie Brown and Snoopy Show (1983, 1985): composer
- It's Flashbeagle, Charlie Brown (1984): composer, lyricist, singer
- Garfield in the Rough (1984): composer, lyricist, singer, voices of Girl Cats
- The Romance of Betty Boop (1985): composer, lyricist, voice of Betty Boop
- Garfield's Halloween Adventure (1985): composer, lyricist, voice of Woman at Door
- You're a Good Man, Charlie Brown (1985): associate producer, musical director
- Jem (1985–1988): voice of Danse
- Happy New Year, Charlie Brown! (1986): composer, singer ("Slow Slow Quick Quick")
- Garfield in Paradise (1986): composer, voice of Owooda
- Wrinkles: In Need of Cuddles (1986): composer, associate director, voice of Mama
- Garfield Goes Hollywood (1987): composer, voice of Desirée the Classical Cat
- Cathy (1987): voice of Brenda
- A Garfield Christmas Special (1987): composer, singer
- Snoopy: The Musical (1988): musical director
- Garfield and Friends (1988–1990): composer, voice of Nermal, Mother turtle, Mariah, Natalie, Chloe, and others
- Garfield: His 9 Lives (1988): composer, voice of Chloe and Sara
- This Is America, Charlie Brown (1988): music director, composer, singer in the segment "The Music and Heroes of America"
- Garfield's Babes and Bullets (1989): composer, voice of Tanya
- Garfield's Thanksgiving (1989): composer
- You Don't Look 40, Charlie Brown (1990) as herself
- Garfield Gets a Life (1991): composer
- Tiny Toon Adventures (1992): voice of Roxy and Bird Toon
- Animaniacs (1996): voice of Googi Goop
- A Lot in Common (2004): composer

=== Other ===
- Am I Cool or What? (1991): singer, "Up on a Fence"
- The Nuttiest Nutcracker (1999): voice of Sparkle
- The Little Mermaid II: Return to the Sea (2000): singer on "Down to the Sea"
- Soulcalibur II (2002): English dub of Taki
- Zone of the Enders: The 2nd Runner (2003): English dub of Angie
- Airforce Delta Strike (2004): English dub of Ellen McNichol/Collette Le Clerc
