= Garfield on the Town =

1983 Garfield TV special

- Title card
- Written by: Jim Davis and Lorenzo Music
- Directed by: Phil Roman
- Starring: Lorenzo Music; Thom Huge; Gregg Berger; Julie Payne; Sandi Huge; George Wendt; C. Lindsay Workman; Desirée Goyette; Allyce Beasley
- Theme music composer: Ed Bogas and Desirée Goyette (music and lyrics); Robert Vandervort (co-writer of "Home Again"); Desirée Goyette and Lou Rawls (vocals)
- Country of origin: United States
- Original language: English

Production
- Executive producer: Jay Poynor
- Producers: Lee Mendelson and Bill Melendez
- Cinematography: Amy Barrick
- Editors: Roger Donley; Michael Tomack; Richard C. Allen
- Running time: 24 minutes
- Production companies: Mendelson/Melendez Productions; United Media Productions

Original release
- Network: CBS
- Release: October 28, 1983

Related
- Here Comes Garfield; Garfield in the Rough

Garfield on the Town is a 1983 animated television special, directed by Phil Roman and based on the Garfield comic strip by Jim Davis. It once again starred Lorenzo Music as the voice of Garfield (who also co-wrote the special with Davis), and also featured the voices of Thom Huge, Gregg Berger and Julie Payne.

The special was first broadcast on October 28, 1983, on CBS. It won the Primetime Emmy Award for Outstanding Animated Program and has been released on LaserDisc and DVD.

This is the second of twelve Garfield television specials made between 1982 and 1991.

== Plot ==
Jon Arbuckle becomes concerned about Garfield and his behavior after he and Odie mess up his house at the beginning of the special. Jon drives Garfield to the pet hospital, but Garfield accidentally falls out of Jon's car and ends up getting lost downtown, where he encounters a large gang of hostile alley cats known as the Claws. After Garfield antagonizes the gang's leader, he flees into an abandoned Italian restaurant, where he reunites with his estranged mother. The building was actually Garfield's birthplace and where he inherited his love for lasagna. Meanwhile, Jon calls Garfield's veterinarian, Dr. Liz Wilson, to tell her about Garfield's disappearance. Liz suggests that Jon would "want a tow truck". Jon then calls the town's local newspaper to run a Lost and Found ad to find Garfield and decides to cut his ad short as it would cost him too much money for a full size description.

The next day, Garfield meets the rest of his extended family, including his sickly half-brother Raoul, his cousin Sly, who is the security guard on watch for the Claws, and his tough maternal grandfather. Garfield is appalled to learn that everyone in his entire family are mousers. Meanwhile, the Claws finally track Garfield down, surround the building, and demand him to turn himself in. However, the family decides to fight the Claws instead of giving Garfield to them. Garfield hides in fear while his family fights the Claws and defeats them. After that, Garfield's grandfather tells him that he is supposed to live with Jon instead. Reassured by his mother that they all envy his normal life, Garfield says goodbye to his family and misses them. Frightened, tired, and hungry, Garfield walks along a deserted street as it starts to rain. He then sees Jon's car, and chases him until he collapses on the sidewalk from exhaustion. Jon and Odie rush over to Garfield, who wakes up and becomes happy to be reunited with them. Jon then puts Garfield in the back seat with a lasagna that he made for him, returns Garfield home and puts him to bed.

The next morning at Jon's house, Odie wakes Garfield up, happy that he is home. Garfield looks in a mirror next to his bed, thinking that meeting his mother was all a dream, but he sees a silhouette of a cat in the window. He then goes over to the window to see that his mother had followed Jon to the house to make sure her son made it home safely. After his mother leaves the front yard, Garfield emotionally says goodbye to her and thanks her for being there for him.

== Voice cast ==
- Lorenzo Music as Garfield
- Thom Huge as Jon Arbuckle
- Gregg Berger as Odie/Ali Cat
- Sandi Huge as Garfield's long lost mother
- George Wendt as Ràoul, Garfield's sickly half-brother
- C. Lindsay Workman (credited as Lindsay Workman) as Garfield's maternal grandfather
- Julie Payne as Dr. Liz Wilson, Garfield's veterinarian
- Desirée Goyette as Girl Cat #1
- Allyce Beasley as Girl Cats #2 & #3

== Songs ==
- "Good Morning" (instrumental)
- "Just Another Crazy Day" performed by Lou Rawls
- "The Monday Morning Blues" (instrumental)
- "Out on the Town" (instrumental)
- "Startin' from Scratch" performed by Lou Rawls
- "Showdown" (instrumental)
- "Home Again" performed by Desirée Goyette
- "Reunited" (instrumental)
- "The Claws" performed by Goyette / Rawls
- "Final Showdown" (instrumental)
- "The Rescue" (instrumental)
- "Because I'm Home" performed by Desirée Goyette
- "Goodnight" (instrumental)
- "I'm Home" performed by Desirée Goyette
- "Out on the Town (reprise)" (instrumental)

== Production ==
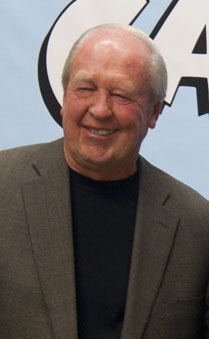
In 2014, Garfield creator Jim Davis identified Garfield on the Town as a personal favorite special.

Lee Mendelson and Bill Melendez, best known for the Peanuts specials, produced Garfield on the Town. The special was directed by Phil Roman, who had previously directed Here Comes Garfield in 1982. It was the last Garfield special Roman directed before founding his own company called Film Roman to produce the specials himself, starting with Garfield in the Rough (1984).

The special marks the first time the character of Jon Arbuckle is voiced by Thom Huge. Sandy Kenyon originally voiced Jon in Here Comes Garfield. Huge later voiced Jon in the remaining specials and in the Garfield and Friends TV series.

== Broadcast and release ==
The special was originally aired on CBS on October 28, 1983, and was viewed by 40 million people. It has been re-broadcast in subsequent years. Ballantine Books published a 64-page illustrated book adaptation in 1983.

In July 2004, Garfield on the Town was released on the DVD Garfield as Himself, along with Here Comes Garfield (1982) and Garfield Gets a Life (1991). It was released on another DVD compilation, The Garfield Holiday Collection, on November 4, 2014, sold only by Walmart, and was also made available for digital download on November 11 that year.

== Reception ==
At the 36th Primetime Emmy Awards in 1984, Garfield on the Town won the Primetime Emmy Award for Outstanding Animated Program. Louisiana's The Town Talk's 1985 review called Garfield "outrageous" and said there was "popular demand" for the special.

In 2004, DVD Talk critic Randy Miller judged the Garfield as Himself specials to be "quite enjoyable," highlighting "a long-lost family reunion." In 2014, with the release of The Garfield Holiday Collection, Jim Davis identified Garfield on the Town as a personal favorite, explaining, "Garfield actually meets his mother on that. It was very special."
