= John Sparey =

American cartoon animator and director

John Sparey (January 17, 1927 – December 15, 2010) was a cartoon animator and director. His first credit was Calvin and the Colonel. He died at the age of 83.
