= Garfield's Halloween Adventure =

1985 American TV special

- Title
- Created by: Jim Davis
- Written by: Jim Davis
- Directed by: Phil Roman
- Starring: Lorenzo Music; Thom Huge; Gregg Berger; C. Lindsay Workman; Desirée Goyette
- Theme music composer: Ed Bogas and Desirée Goyette (music and lyrics); Lou Rawls and Lorenzo Music (vocals)
- Country of origin: United States
- Original language: English

Production
- Executive producer: Jay Poynor
- Producer: Phil Roman
- Editors: Mark R. Crookston; Sam Horta
- Running time: 24 minutes
- Production companies: Film Roman; United Media Productions

Original release
- Network: CBS
- Release: October 30, 1985

Related
- Garfield in the Rough; Garfield in Paradise

Garfield's Halloween Adventure (originally titled Garfield in Disguise) is a 1985 American animated television special based on the Garfield comic strip. It is directed by Phil Roman and written by Garfield creator Jim Davis, and features the voices of Lorenzo Music, Thom Huge, Gregg Berger and C. Lindsay Workman. It originally aired on CBS on October 30, 1985.

The special, a ghost story with a pirate theme, originally aired near Halloween and afterwards often played around the time of the holiday until the turn of the century. It won the Primetime Emmy Award for Outstanding Animated Program and was also the subject of an illustrated children's book adaptation.

This is the fourth of twelve Garfield television specials made between 1982 and 1991.

== Plot ==
Garfield is woken up early one morning by Binky the Clown on TV, and learns that it is actually Halloween, causing him to become very excited about getting candy by trick-or-treating that night. Garfield tricks Odie into thinking dogs are required to trick-or-treat with cats and give almost all their candy to them, saving one piece of candy for the dog. Odie is tempted by the minimal reward, and he and Garfield head to the attic to find costumes in an old trunk. After considering a number of options, Garfield decides that he and Odie will be pirates.

Garfield and Odie head out trick-or-treating amongst other neighborhood children that evening. When Odie expresses fear, Garfield assures him the scary characters they see are only children in costumes, only to lift some of the masks and discover the characters are actually supernatural. By nightfall, Garfield and Odie arrive at a boat dock and Garfield decides to cross the river on a row boat to try to visit more houses. When Garfield tells him to put out the oars, Odie misinterprets the command and accidentally throws the oars overboard, leaving the boat adrift as the current carries Garfield and Odie down the river.

Soon, the boat arrives at an abandoned dock near a run-down mansion. They venture inside the home, thinking it is deserted, but are startled to find an old man sitting in an armchair. The man relates a story that exactly a hundred years ago, pirates, pursued by government troops, buried their treasure under the mansion floor and signed a blood oath to return for the treasure at midnight a hundred years later, even if it meant rising from the grave. The old man reveals he was the ten-year-old cabin boy whom the pirates had long ago. Garfield and Odie start to leave, and Garfield asks the man if he wants to come too, but he has disappeared. Running out of the house, they watch helplessly as the man steals their boat, stranding a mournful Garfield and Odie.

The mansion's grandfather clock chimes midnight, and Garfield and Odie watch as a ghostly ship materializes on the river and pirate ghosts emerge from the water. Garfield and Odie hide in an empty cupboard as the ghosts reclaim their buried treasure from the mansion's floorboards. As he and Garfield stay where they are, Odie sneezes, alerting the ghosts to their whereabouts. Making a run for it after they are discovered, Garfield and Odie jump into the river to escape, where Odie has to rescue Garfield as he cannot swim and also loses his pirate hat. Garfield and Odie get washed ashore and find their boat with their candy still inside and untouched. They go home happily, and Garfield repays Odie's rescue by reluctantly giving him his rightful share of the candy. Garfield then tries to see what's on TV, he then realizes that the old man (who found Garfield's pirate hat) is actually the host of a late night pirate movie festival. Garfield then decides that his Halloween adventure is over, turns the TV off and falls asleep.

== Voice cast ==
- Lorenzo Music as Garfield
- Thom Huge as Jon Arbuckle/Binky the Clown
- Gregg Berger as Odie/TV Announcer
- C. Lindsay Workman as Old Man
- Desirée Goyette as Woman at the door

== Production ==
Phil Roman, who previously directed Garfield specials Here Comes Garfield and Garfield on the Town, founded his own company called Film Roman to continue producing the specials. Garfield in Disguise was one of the first specials he made under his own company, after Garfield in the Rough. Writer Jim Davis stated he intended the special to begin on a familiar tone, then "go somewhere that would at least scare 4-year-olds". For the part of the old man, C. Lindsay Workman was cast as the voice, having previously voiced Garfield's grandfather in Garfield on the Town. Producer Lee Mendelson chose Workman, searching for a deep voice.

The animation was carried out in Indiana, with Davis saying animators sought to achieve a "swirly, cross-dissolve" effect to portray the ghosts. The animators also sought to give the ghosts a glowing effect. Workman's character was designed to emphasize his advanced age, with one staff artist urging the addition of warts and different-looking eyes. For the musical score, Ed Bogas and Desirée Goyette were employed, having previously worked on Garfield television specials.

== Songs ==
- "Good Morning" (instrumental)
- "This is the Night (Trick or Treat)" performed by Lou Rawls and Desiree Goyette
- "Scaredy Cat" (instrumental)
- "Breakfast" (instrumental)
- "What Should I Be?" performed by Lorenzo Music
- "Yo Ho Ho Ho" performed by Lorenzo Music
- "Scaredy Cat" performed by Lou Rawls
- "Yo Ho Ho Ho (reprise)" performed by Lorenzo Music

== Broadcast and release ==
Announced as Garfield's Halloween Adventure, Garfield in Disguise was originally aired on October 30, 1985, along with the 1966 Peanuts special It's the Great Pumpkin, Charlie Brown, on CBS. In later years, it was often aired in the Halloween season along with Great Pumpkin. By 1999, Halloween Adventure was not regularly broadcast. That October 28 would see the final airing on CBS.

A 64-page illustrated book adaptation was published in 1985 by Random House Publishing Group, originally under the title Garfield in Disguise and later retitled Garfield's Halloween Adventure. It includes an alternate ending in which Garfield steals a ring from the pirates' treasure, resulting in the ghosts pursuing the protagonists back to the Arbuckle house, where Garfield surrenders the ring. The special was included on the DVD The Garfield Holiday Collection on November 4, 2014, and was also made available for digital download a week later.

== Reception ==
In 1985, Rick Sherwood of the Pittsburgh Post-Gazette called the special "a charming story" and Garfield "the classic kitty". The Bryan Times in Ohio praised the special as "hilarious". In 1986, Garfield's Halloween Adventure won a Primetime Emmy Award for Outstanding Animated Program. It was the third Garfield special to win the Emmy, with the only other nominee being another Garfield special, Garfield in Paradise. In 1988, Jon Burlingame of Hendersonville's The Times-News panned Garfield’s Halloween Adventure as "more up-to-date but charmless" in comparison to It's the Great Pumpkin, Charlie Brown, and objected that the Peanuts special was aired less in favor of the Garfield cartoon.

In a 2013 roundtable, The A.V. Club writers analyzed Garfield’s Halloween Adventure, with Erik Adams judging the special to be distinguished in Garfield TV canon by "Its abrupt left turn into abject terror," and concluded it was nearly as good as It's the Great Pumpkin, Charlie Brown. Molly Eichel agreed "the special takes a left turn into something more sinister". In 2015, Johnny Brayson of Bustle wrote "I may be in the minority, but I consider Garfield's Halloween Adventure to be on equal footing with Charlie Brown," citing its humor and horror.
