= Garfield Goes Hollywood =

1987 Garfield TV special

- Title card
- Created by: Jim Davis
- Written by: Jim Davis
- Directed by: Phil Roman
- Starring: Lorenzo Music; Thom Huge; Gregg Berger; Nino Tempo; Frank Welker; Desirée Goyette
- Theme music composer: Ed Bogas and Desirée Goyette (music and lyrics); Desirée Goyette, Lou Rawls, Lorenzo Music and Thom Huge (vocals)
- Country of origin: United States
- Original language: English

Production
- Producer: Phil Roman
- Cinematography: Rolf Saxon; Tim Whintall
- Editors: Sam Horta; Mark R. Crookston; Timothy J. Borquez
- Running time: 24 minutes
- Production companies: Film Roman; United Media Productions

Original release
- Network: CBS
- Release: May 8, 1987

Related
- Garfield in Paradise; A Garfield Christmas

Garfield Goes Hollywood is a 1987 American animated television special based on the Garfield comic strip. It once again featured Lorenzo Music as the voice of Garfield. The special was first broadcast on May 8, 1987, on CBS and was nominated for Outstanding Animated Program at the 39th Primetime Emmy Awards. It has been released on both VHS and DVD home video.

This was the sixth of twelve Garfield television specials made between 1982 and 1991. In the special, Garfield attempts to raise money to go to Hollywood and appear on Pet Search.

== Storyline ==
One night, Garfield, Jon and Odie happen to be watching a show called "Pet Search" (a pets' version of Star Search) where they learn that the winner receives $1,000 as well as the chance to compete in the national finals in Hollywood. Jon wishes that Garfield and Odie had talent so they could be on the show. The two perform a dance number for him, which excites him greatly. However, Garfield starts to have second thoughts when Jon gets involved and they see how bad he is at music.

The night to perform arrives and the opening acts turn out to be shoddy, from a trained bird mysteriously dying, to tap-dancing pigeons flying the coop, to a roller-skating bear unable to maintain his balance. Seeing this, Jon is confident that they have the competition in their favor, since there's only one act following them. They perform as an Elvis style trio named "Johnny Bop and the Two-Steps" (rather reluctantly, because they did not want Jon involved in their act, as they think he is awful at music). Garfield believes it is embarrassing because they all have to wear kitschy 1950s-era costumes.

Despite the silly act, they win the regional competition (after a dog that plays five instruments simultaneously is disqualified after Odie exposes him as just a man in a dog costume) and are able to compete at the national competition in Hollywood. Garfield at first thinks he will embarrass himself in front of America, but changes his mind when he sees the glitz and glamour of Hollywood and gets lodged at a fancy hotel. Garfield and Odie agree that their act is too mediocre to win first prize, so they destroy Jon's guitar when he is not looking. Jon is more worried than shocked, saying the finals are around the corner and there is no act. Garfield tells Jon not to worry as they plan their own routine.

Meanwhile, the "Pet Search" finals are underway with a different host named Burt and an announcer named Bob. Bob tells Burt about the prizes the top winner will receive such as a Hollywood contract, a trip around the world and $1,000,000 and the second-place winner will receive a boat. While Jon, Garfield, and Odie watch the other competitors, Jon has a talk with them which is opposed to his giddiness at winning $1,000 in the first competition, he says that even though he would love to win all those prizes, he thinks that Garfield and Odie should lose this contest so that they can have their old lives back at their home and it would better for them which Garfield protests. Garfield and Odie compete in the finals as a tango dancing duo named "The Dancing Armandos," only to receive the boat for second place and lose the top prize package to an opera-singing cat. Angry over losing, Garfield destroys the set, but Jon assures him they still have each other. The special ends back home where Garfield finally admits to Jon that it was all for the best that they are home again, as they are on their boat fantasizing about sailing to exotic locations worldwide, which the camera pans out to show it in their backyard and revealing they live in a landlocked part of the country (identified as Muncie, Indiana in their national introduction - this is series creator Jim Davis' hometown).

== Cast ==
- Lorenzo Music - Garfield
- Thom Huge - Jon Arbuckle
- Gregg Berger - Odie / regional Pet Search host / Bob / Grandma Fogerty
- Nino Tempo - Herbie
- Frank Welker - Burt
- Desirée Goyette - Desirée the Classical Cat (Note: Uncredited)

== Songs ==
- "They Love Us" performed by Lou Rawls
- "The Wizard of Love" performed by Thom Huge, Lorenzo Music and Desirée Goyette
- "Hollywood Feels So Good" performed by Lou Rawls
- "Desirée's Meow Solo" performed by Desirée Goyette
