= Garfield Gets a Life =

1991 Garfield TV special

- The Title
- Written by: Jim Davis
- Directed by: John Sparey
- Starring: Lorenzo Music; Thom Huge; Gregg Berger; Julie Payne; Frank Welker; June Foray; Kim Campbell; Kevin Campbell
- Music by: David Benoit and Desirée Goyette (music and lyrics); Lou Rawls, B.B. King and The Temptations (vocals)
- Country of origin: United States
- Original language: English

Production
- Executive producers: Jim Davis; Jay Poynor
- Producer: Phil Roman
- Editors: Timothy Borquez; Brian F. Mars
- Running time: 22 minutes
- Production companies: Film Roman; United Media/Mendelson; Paws, Inc.

Original release
- Network: CBS
- Release: May 8, 1991

Garfield Gets a Life is a 1991 animated television special based on the Garfield comic strip written by Jim Davis. It features Lorenzo Music as the voice of Garfield. The special was first broadcast on May 8, 1991, on CBS. It was nominated for Outstanding Animated Program at the 43rd Primetime Emmy Awards. It was the final in the series of twelve Garfield television specials, as the success of Garfield and Friends caused CBS to cancel new animated specials in 1990. It is the only CBS Garfield special directed by John Sparey instead of Phil Roman, although the latter served as producer. It is also the final Garfield production to feature music by Desirée Goyette who had performed for previous Garfield specials and various episodes of Garfield and Friends.

Unlike the other Garfield specials, despite the title, Garfield Gets a Life focuses mainly on Jon rather than the titular fat cat; Odie only appears twice in this special. It has been released on both VHS and DVD home video.

The songs "Monday Morning Blues (Blues for Mr. G)" (performed by B.B. King) and "Shake Your Paw" (performed by The Temptations) were released on the 1991 album Am I Cool or What? An instrumental version of the opening theme, under the title "Spare Time" (performed by David Benoit), was also released on the album.

== Plot ==
On a dull Monday morning, Jon Arbuckle realizes how uneventful his life is and sets out to change it. He goes out to various locales to meet girls, but is turned down by every one. At home, Jon watches an advertisement on TV for the Lorenzo School for the Personality Impaired and chooses to attend. There, he meets a girl named Mona, and the two like each other and go to Jon's house. There, Garfield is worried about Jon being in a relationship and goes to tell him. Mona begins sneezing and Jon learns that she is allergic to cats. Jon chooses to stay with Garfield, but he agrees to stay friends with Mona, and the two go out to dinner as Garfield follows them.

== Cast ==
- Lorenzo Music – Garfield
- Thom Huge – Jon Arbuckle
- Gregg Berger – Odie / Stinky / Announcer
- Julie Payne – Library Girl / Receptionist
- Frank Welker – Lorenzo / Gunner
- June Foray – Mona / Librarian
- Kim Campbell – Woman at Laundromat
- Kevin Campbell – Man #1
- Gregg Berger – Man #2 (Note: Uncredited)
- Thom Huge – Ranger (Note: Uncredited)
- Frank Welker – Station Announcer (Note: Uncredited)
