= Here Comes Garfield =

1982 American TV special

- Written by: Jim Davis
- Directed by: Phil Roman
- Starring: Lorenzo Music; Sandy Kenyon; Henry Corden; Hal Smith; Hank Garrett; Gregg Berger; Angela Lee
- Theme music composer: Desirée Goyette; Ed Bogas (music and lyrics); Lou Rawls; Desirée Goyette (vocals)
- Country of origin: United States

Production
- Executive producer: Jay Poynor
- Producers: Lee Mendelson and Bill Melendez
- Editors: Chuck McCann; Roger Donley
- Running time: 24 minutes
- Production companies: United Media; Mendelson/Melendez Productions

Original release
- Network: CBS
- Release: October 25, 1982

Related
- Garfield on the Town

Here Comes Garfield is a 1982 animated television special based on the comic strip Garfield by Jim Davis. It was the first half-hour Garfield TV special. It is directed by Phil Roman and features Lorenzo Music as the voice of Garfield the house cat, as well as the voices of Sandy Kenyon, Henry Corden and Gregg Berger.

The special was first broadcast on October 25, 1982, on CBS. It was a Nielsen ratings success and was nominated for two Emmy Awards. It was accompanied by a soundtrack album and a children's book adaptation and has been released on VHS and DVD.

This is the first of twelve Garfield television specials made between 1982 and 1991.

== Plot ==
Garfield harasses Jon Arbuckle for breakfast and picks a fight with Odie, causing Jon to send them outside to play. Garfield and Odie harass a neighbor's dog when the owner, Hubert, angrily calls the pound to capture them. When the dogcatcher arrives, Garfield flees, but Odie is too stupid to run and is captured. When Garfield returns home, he is unable to tell Jon that Odie is in peril. Garfield realizes how boring his life is without Odie around, so he decides to rescue him from the pound. Although Garfield successfully makes it to the pound, the dogcatcher captures him for trespassing and trying to steal the cell keys. After Garfield is put behind bars, he learns from another cat, Fast Eddie, that Odie is going to be euthanized in the morning.

During the night, Garfield has a series of flashbacks of all the good times that he and Odie had together. The next day, Garfield tearfully watches the dogcatcher taking Odie down the hall to be euthanized. Meanwhile, a little girl arrives at the pound for a pet and chooses Garfield. Garfield manages to see his chance to escape and when the cell finally opens, he leads the other animals down the hall and past the little girl. Garfield rescues Odie from the dogcatcher by biting his hand. Garfield, Odie, and the other animals escape from the pound by knocking down the door on the dogcatcher, who tries to stop them from escaping.

As the other animals run to freedom, Garfield and Odie return to Jon's house, where they knock down the front door while Jon tries to fix it. Jon assumes that Garfield and Odie were having fun during the night "singing on the fence, chasing cars," while he sat home and worried himself sick about them. Garfield and Odie are bemused and they agree with Jon. At breakfast, things return to normal as Garfield derides Odie's begging at the table, but he decides to try it himself after seeing Jon gives Odie his steak. All Garfield receives from Jon is a plate of bacon and eggs, which he angrily smacks into Jon's face and admitting: "I'm only human".

== Voice cast ==
- Lorenzo Music as Garfield
- Sandy Kenyon as Jon Arbuckle
- Henry Corden as Hubert
- Hal Smith as Reba & Skinny
- Hank Garrett as Fast Eddy & Fluffy
- Gregg Berger as Odie & Salesman
- Angela Lee as Little Girl

== Soundtrack ==
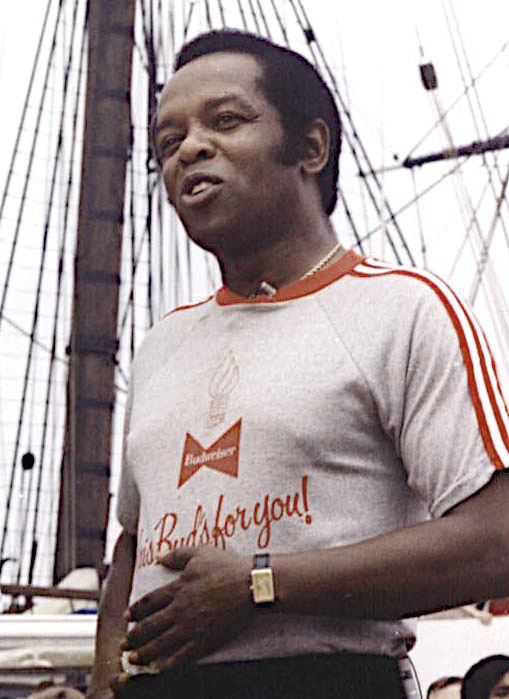
Lou Rawls performed for the Here Comes Garfield soundtrack, inspired by Bill Cosby's Fat Albert cartoons.

A soundtrack album for Here Comes Garfield was released on LP and cassette on Epic Records in 1982. It featured songs from and inspired by the television special, composed by Ed Bogas and Desirée Goyette and performed by Goyette and Lou Rawls. Some of these songs were released in re-recorded versions on the 1991 Am I Cool or What? album.

=== Track list ===
1. "Here Comes Garfield" (Lou Rawls)
2. "Move Me" (Desirée Goyette)
3. "Foolin' Around" (Lou Rawls and Desirée Goyette)
4. "Long About Midnight" (Lou Rawls)
5. "Big Fat Hairy Deal" (Lou Rawls)
6. "Up On a Fence" (Desirée Goyette)
7. "Life Is Just a Roller Coaster" (Lou Rawls)
8. "So Long Old Friend" (Desirée Goyette)
9. "Together Again" (Lou Rawls and Desirée Goyette)
10. "Here Comes Garfield (Reprise)" (Desirée Goyette)

== Production ==
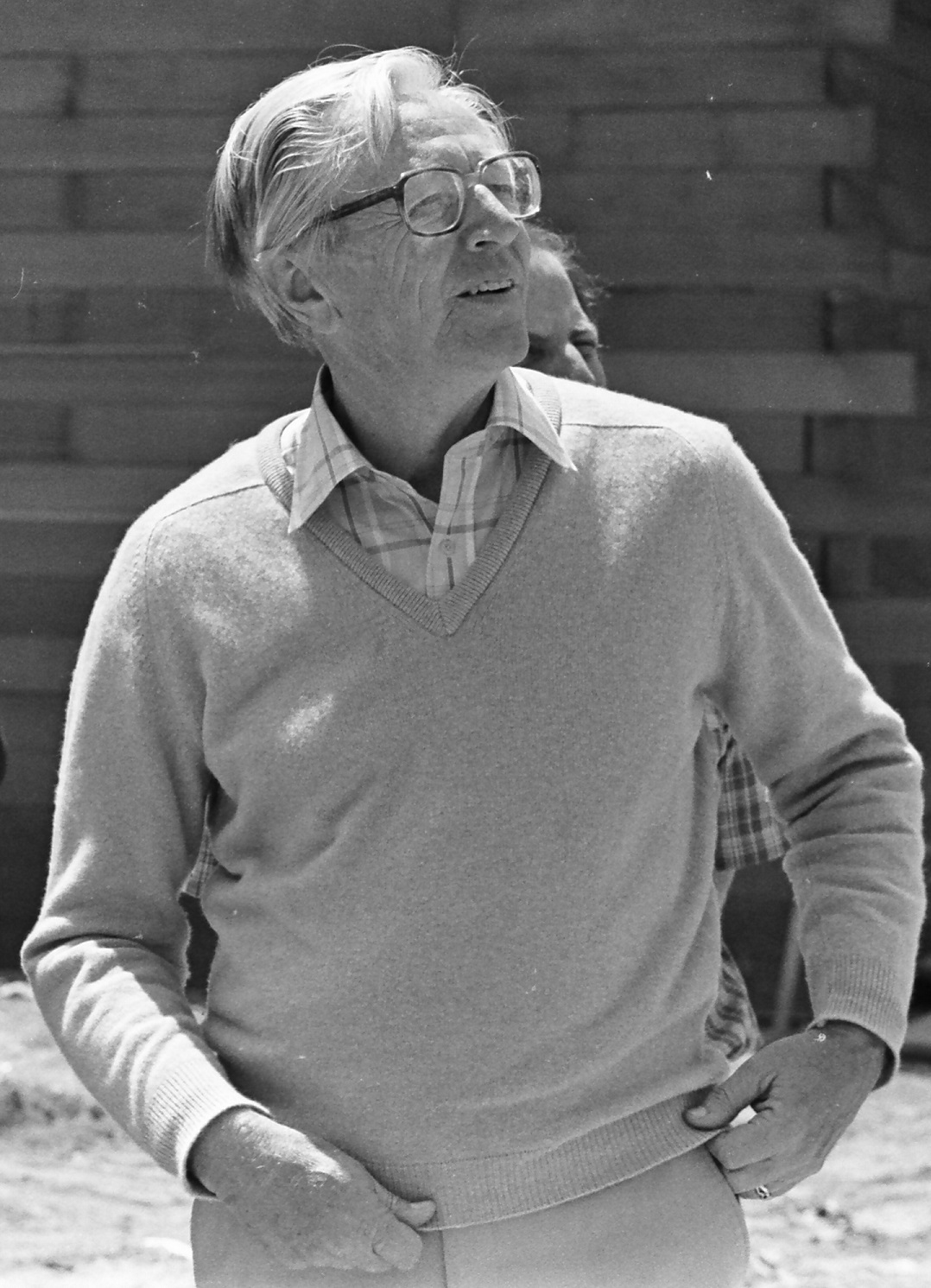
Peanuts creator Charles M. Schulz advised Jim Davis on the animation in Here Comes Garfield.

Here Comes Garfield was Garfield creator Jim Davis' first television special, coming after his 1980 book Garfield at Large topped The New York Times bestsellers list. For the opening sequence, Garfield dances to the theme song. In 1981, Davis was working in a California studio on how to convincingly depict this, as in previous comics, the fictional cat always walked on all four feet. Peanuts creator Charles M. Schulz was in the same studio that day, and redrew Davis' work, advising him, "The problem is, you've made Garfield's feet too small. Little tiny cat feet". Peanuts TV special producers Bill Melendez and Lee Mendelson also produced Here Comes Garfield, a consequence of the two comics sharing the same syndicate, United Media.

Lou Rawls, who had just completed a USO tour at army bases, joined the Garfield franchise with this project, and finished recording the soundtrack in mid-1982. He explained his decision, "I figured if Bill Cosby could do Fat Albert and the Cosby Kids and live forever on the earnings, why can't I do Garfield?"

Besides her contribution to the music, Desirée Goyette was also the performance model for Garfield's dance during the title song.

== Broadcast and release ==
Here Comes Garfield was first aired by CBS, on October 25, 1982, along with the 1966 Peanuts special It's the Great Pumpkin, Charlie Brown. It was viewed by an audience of 50 million people. This was considered a good rating, leading to speculation CBS could launch a successful series of Garfield specials similar to the Peanuts specials.

Ballantine Books published a 64-page illustrated book adaptation in September 1982. In July 2004, Here Comes Garfield was released on the DVD Garfield as Himself, along with Garfield on the Town (1983) and Garfield Gets a Life (1991).

== Reception ==
At the 35th Primetime Emmy Awards in 1983, Here Comes Garfield was nominated for the Primetime Emmy Award for Outstanding Animated Program and Phil Roman was nominated for the Outstanding Individual Achievement in Animated Programming. In 2004, DVD Talk critic Randy Miller judged the Garfield as Himself specials to be "quite enjoyable," highlighting "a daring dog pound rescue". The DVD debuted 35th in sales.
