= Garfield in the Rough =

1985 Garfield TV special

- Title card
- Created by: Jim Davis
- Written by: Jim Davis
- Directed by: Phil Roman
- Starring: Lorenzo Music as the voice of Garfield
- Voices of: Thom Huge; Gregg Berger; George Wendt; Desirée Goyette; Hal Smith; Orson Bean
- Composers: Ed Bogas and Desirée Goyette; Desirée Goyette, Lou Rawls, Lorenzo Music and Thom Huge (vocals)
- Country of origin: United States
- Original language: English

Production
- Executive producer: Jay Poynor
- Producer: Phil Roman
- Editor: Sam Horta
- Running time: 24 minutes
- Production companies: Film Roman; United Media Productions

Original release
- Network: CBS
- Release: October 26, 1984

Related
- Garfield on the Town; Garfield's Halloween Adventure

Garfield in the Rough is a 1984 American animated television special based on the Garfield comic strip. It once again featured Lorenzo Music as the voice of Garfield. The special was first broadcast on October 26, 1984, on CBS. It has been released on VHS, LaserDisc and DVD home video.

This is the third of twelve Garfield television specials made between 1982 and 1991. In this special, Garfield, Jon and Odie go camping. It is the first Garfield special not to feature the involvement of Lee Mendelson and Bill Melendez.

== Storyline ==
Garfield is living in a boring, black and white world, claiming that all the color has gone out of his life (which explains the subtitle at the beginning: "Please do not adjust your sets; all the color has temporarily gone out of Garfield's life"). Jon agrees that all the color has gone and suggests a vacation as a remedy. The color suddenly comes back into Garfield's life. He is excited that Jon wants to take him and Odie on vacation, where he imagines himself in places such as Acapulco, Hawaii and Venice. After realizing that each destination has its drawbacks, Garfield concludes it doesn't really matter where they're actually going for their vacation, since in any case they won't be staying home. This joy is short-lived once Jon announces that they're going camping, but Jon forces Garfield to come along anyway.

After a long, exhausting journey (from Garfield's point of view), the trio arrives at the campgrounds to check in, while Garfield immediately takes a disliking to one of the camp rangers for insulting him. After a few shenanigans at their campsite, including placing a live fish in the coffee pot, Jon finally has his new "super deluxe" tent set up, although the result doesn't really match the advertisement --- "Somehow it looked larger in the ad," Jon glumly muses. Unlike Jon, who is very enthusiastic about it, Garfield doesn't take to the outdoors, stating that "it would be greater if it were inside". As night falls, the trio listen to a music program on the radio, which is interrupted by a news bulletin about a deadly panther that had escaped from the local zoo earlier that morning and reported in the Lake Woebegone area. Right after this news on the radio, the announcer says: "We now return to our regular broadcast of fun music." (it then plays "So Long Old Friend" from the first Garfield TV special) Believing the news, Garfield is terrified and wants to leave, but Jon assures him that Lake Woebegone is miles from their location and that they're perfectly safe. Following the announcement, Jon sings an old campfire song that his mother used to sing called "Camping is my Life" (while Garfield and Odie endure his banjo playing) before the trio goes to bed. After they enter into their tent, the panther comes out from a vantage point on the nearby hilltops and growls as it eyes their campsite.

The next day, Odie wakes Jon up at the crack of dawn by licking his feet. This sends Jon rolling down the hill into the lake, still in his tent with Garfield in tow. At Garfield's suggestion that he "go and play with something poisonous", Odie runs into the nearby woods, passing a sign that reveals it to be Lake Woebegone, where the panther is lurking. The forest rangers are hunting for the panther and attempt to warn Jon to evacuate, but after finding no one at the campsite, leave a note and move on. Unfortunately, a gust of wind kicks up after they leave, tossing the message into a recently extinguished campfire, where it burns up. To make matters worse, Jon discovers that Garfield and Odie have eaten all of the food for the week, except for the dried fruit, and goes off on a tirade. Meanwhile, Garfield sneaks off into the woods to "wait for the heat to die down". While there, he starts to appreciate the beauty of nature, until he meets two forest animals named Dicky the Beaver and Billy the Bunny who warn Garfield about the escaped panther, reporting that it has already attacked other forest animals. Odie appears, after scaring all but Garfield away by accident, and the two eavesdrop on the two rangers passing by with a tranquilizer gun, hoping to capture the panther. Garfield and Odie decide that now is the time to collect Jon and leave before they are possibly attacked by the beast, and the two run back to the campsite.

Upon their return, Garfield tries to warn Jon of the danger, but Jon doesn't seem to understand the warning, offering them dried fruit and refusing to move. Garfield tries desperately to convince Odie to board the car, warning Odie that they will be dead if they don't leave right away. However, the full moon comes into view and shines down on the camp, revealing that the panther has now entered their campsite and is approaching the trio as they look on in horror. Garfield runs up a tree while Jon and Odie hide in the tent, followed by Jon's car as the panther tears the tent to shreds and then manages to break into the vehicle by smashing through a window. Frightened, but not willing to watch his family die, Garfield leaps from the tree and takes on the panther, clawing at its back, only to be wrestled off. Garfield recovers as the now-enraged panther begins to menacingly creep towards him and lunges at him in an attempt to kill him, until the park rangers enter the campsite and subdue the beast with a tranquilizer dart. Jon praises Garfield for his heroic actions and the rangers come by and tell Jon that they were lucky that they arrived when they did, otherwise they might have been killed. Jon then decides that they have had enough adventure and recommends they break camp and return to civilization, much to Garfield's relief. The rangers return the panther to the zoo, while Garfield, Jon, and Odie set off for home with Garfield bragging over how he took on the panther, as well as struggling to say, "When the going gets tough, the tough get going."

== Cast ==
- Lorenzo Music - Garfield
- Thom Huge - Jon Arbuckle
- Gregg Berger - Odie / Ranger #1 / Radio Announcer
- George Wendt - Ranger #2
- Hal Smith - Dicky Beaver
- Orson Bean - Billy Rabbit
- Desirée Goyette - Girl Cats

== Songs ==
- "Get Me Some 'R and 'R" performed by Lou Rawls
- "Jarabe Tapatío" (instrumental)
- "When I'm Out in the Rough" performed by Lorenzo Music and Thom Huge
- "So Long Old Friend" performed by Desirée Goyette
- "Camping is My Life" performed by Thom Huge
- "The Music of Nature" performed by Desirée Goyette
- "Run-Run I'm afraid" performed by Thom Huge and Desirée Goyette
- "Panther Showdown" (instrumental)
- "Get Me Some 'R and 'R" (instrumental)

== Awards ==
- 1985 Primetime Emmy Award for Outstanding Animated Program
