= Chick Hearn =

American basketball sportscaster (1916–2002)

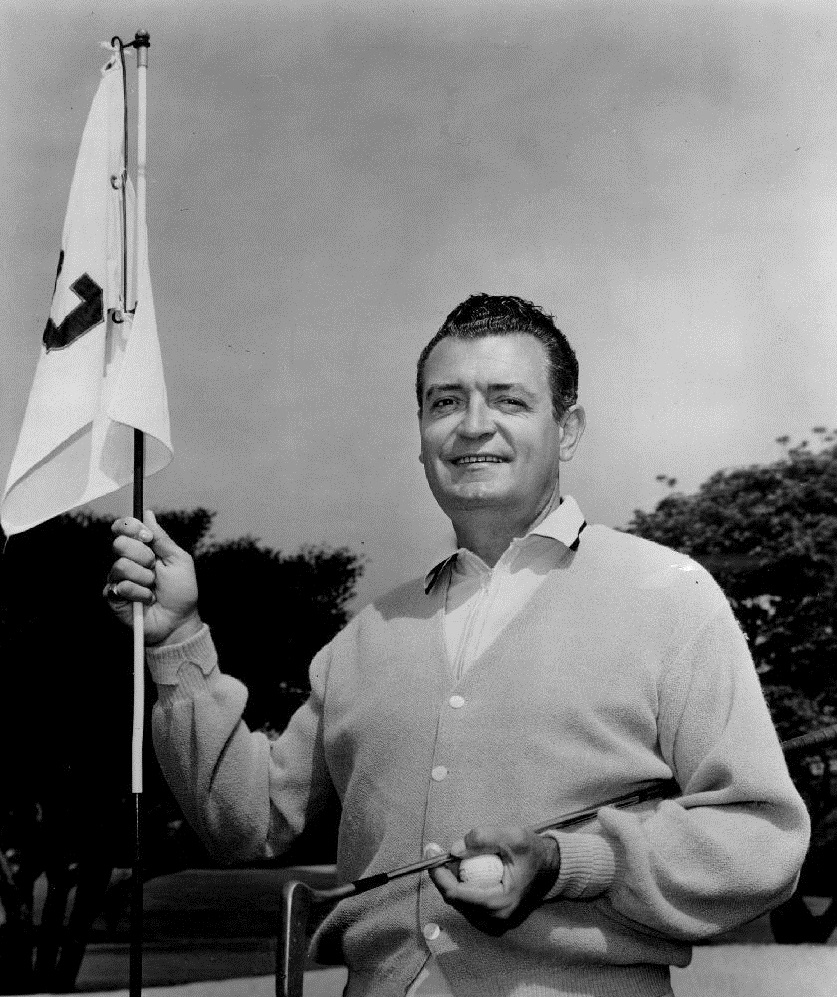
- Hearn in 1963
- Born: Francis Dayle Hearn; November 27, 1916; Buda, Illinois, U.S.
- Died: August 5, 2002 (aged 85); Los Angeles, California, U.S.
- Resting place: Holy Cross Cemetery
- Occupations: Sportscaster and assistant general manager
- Years active: 1957–2002
- Spouse: Marge Jeffers (m. 1938)
- Children: 2

Francis Dayle "Chick" Hearn (November 27, 1916 – August 5, 2002) was an American sportscaster who was the play-by-play announcer for the Los Angeles Lakers of the National Basketball Association for 41 years, as well as the team's assistant general manager for seven years beginning in 1972. Hearn was the first broadcaster named to the Naismith Basketball Hall of Fame. Hearn is remembered for his rapid fire, staccato broadcasting style, associated with colorful phrases such as slam dunk, air ball, and no harm, no foul that have become common basketball vernacular. Hearn broadcast 3,338 consecutive Lakers games starting on November 21, 1965. Most of Hearn's games in the television era were simulcast on both radio and television, even after most teams chose to use different announcers for the different media.

== Life and career ==
=== Early life and nickname ===
Hearn was born in Buda, Illinois and raised in Aurora, Illinois, in west suburban Chicago, and attended high school at Marmion Academy and college at Bradley University. He earned the nickname "Chick" while an Amateur Athletic Union basketball player at Bradley, when teammates played a prank on him: giving him a shoebox to see his surprised reaction when he opened it and found not sneakers inside, but instead a dead chicken.

He and his wife Marge were married August 13, 1938. They had two children, a son, Gary, and a daughter, Samantha aka Janice, both of whom predeceased Hearn. His granddaughter is Shannon. Marge Hearn died January 30, 2016, at the age of 98.

=== Broadcasting streak ===
Hearn's broadcasting streak began on November 21, 1965. Hearn missed the Lakers' game the previous night after having been stranded in Fayetteville, Arkansas, by inclement weather after having announced a game between Arkansas and Texas Tech. Even that was only Hearn's second missed assignment for the Lakers since he had become the team's broadcaster in March 1961. He would not miss another until December 16, 2001. Over the course of the streak, Hearn was paired with several different color commentators, including ”Hot” Rod Hundley, Pat Riley, Keith Erickson, Dick Schad, Lynn Shackelford and Stu Lantz.

Hearn's streak of 3,338 consecutive Lakers games came to an end on December 16, 2001, in order to undergo scheduled cardiac bypass surgery. Hearn recovered from his surgery, but in February 2002, he suffered a broken hip after falling at a gas station, which further delayed his expected return to the Lakers broadcast booth. Hearn recovered from both issues and resumed broadcasting on April 9, 2002, receiving a standing ovation from the Staples Center crowd upon his return. His final broadcast was for the Lakers' radio feed of Game 4 of the 2002 NBA Finals where the Lakers defeated the New Jersey Nets to win their third consecutive NBA championship. His final Lakers-affiliated appearance was as the emcee of the team's 2002 championship parade in June.

=== Assistant general manager ===
Hearn became assistant general manager of the Lakers in 1972, hired by Jack Kent Cooke, the team's owner at the time. Hearn advised management on personnel and trades, and helped negotiate player contracts as part of the role which he held for seven years. Hearn advised team owner Cooke to draft future hall of fame player Magic Johnson in 1979.

=== Non-Lakers work ===
Hearn was the long-time host of Bowling for Dollars on KTLA (1972–1976); KHJ-TV (now KCAL-TV) (1978). He called the closed-circuit television broadcast of the first Ali-Frazier fight in 1971. He also did boxing commentary for Forum boxing fights in Inglewood in the 1980s, usually appearing alongside former featherweight contender Ruben Castillo. Hearn also contributed to KCAL-TV's coverage of the U.S. Open golf tournament from 1957 to 1964. At the time, Hearn handled the sports desk of the local news program on Los Angeles' NBC affiliate, KRCA (now KNBC). Hearn announced USC football and basketball games from 1956 to 1961, and also served as the play-by-play broadcaster for USC football games on tape-delayed, syndicated telecasts during the 1973 season. Hearn called UNLV Runnin' Rebels basketball games on KHJ/KCAL with Ross Porter from 1986 to 1990. During the 1992 Summer Olympics in Barcelona, Spain, Hearn called the play-by-play for USA Men's Basketball games on the pay per view Olympics Triplecast "Red" channel.

==== Television and movie work ====
- The Fish That Saved Pittsburgh: Played a basketball announcer in a basketball version of The Bad News Bears though the players in the story were adults. The movie provided an acting turn for Julius Erving.
- Fletch: Plays himself interviewing Kareem Abdul-Jabbar and while describing Fletch (Chevy Chase) in a dream points out "(Fletch) is actually 6'5" but with the afro 6'9", pretty good dribbler......this gritty kid from the streets of Harlem really creates excitement. $4 million a year, that's true, but he earns every nickel of it. Look how he shakes off four, five players with ease!"
- Garfield and Friends: Voiced an announcer in the episode Basket Brawl (season 2 episode 14). The episode involved Jon, Nermal, and Odie trying to get picnic food past Garfield. Hearn voiced a mouse announcer named "Chick Mouse" while the game's audience was mice.
- Gilligan's Island
  - "Splashdown": The episode involved Hearn as a news commentator as an American crewed spacecraft was scheduled to splashdown near the island.
  - "It's a Bird, It's a Plane": Hearn's voice is heard on the radio in this episode.
- The Harlem Globetrotters on Gilligan's Island: He was the play-by-play for the game between the Globetrotters and the robot team they were playing.
- The Love Bug: Played a reporter during and following a race.
- Matlock: Played a professional wrestling announcer in the second-season episode "The Annihilator".
- Rugrats: Hearn voiced himself in the episode "Touchdown Tommy" while the Dallas Cowboys and Houston Oilers contest the Ultra Bowl.
- The Simpsons: Voiced himself in the episode "Homer Defined" while calling a Lakers game. In the game, Magic Johnson pulls a "Homer" when he slips on the basketball court yet the ball ends up going into the basket.
- My Three Sons: Appeared as the announcer of a model airplane flight competition in the 1962 episode "Air Derby".
- The Fugitive: Season one, episode 30 Appeared as TV Newscaster
- Heaven Can Wait: Uncredited role as a radio announcer for the Rams-Steelers game.
- Sport Goofy in Soccermania: Voiced the announcer of the soccer game.

==== Music ====
Hearn can be heard on the Pink Floyd album The Wall (at the 4:07 mark of the song "Don't Leave Me Now" as "Pink" flips through television channels just before destroying his television set leading into the song "Another Brick in the Wall Pt. 3"). This clip of Hearn appears to have been taken from an actual game between the Lakers and Bulls which was probably recorded during the 1978–79 season. Before the playoffs in the 1986 season, Hearn released a 12-inch rap single "Rap-Around". The song features Hearn in the studio re-creating many of his most famous 'Chickisms' and was distributed by Macola Records (who distributed an early Dr. Dre/Ice Cube group "World Class Wreckin' Cru"). The song was played on Los Angeles television and radio stations, including the Lakers' televised games.

=== Death ===
During the summer of 2002, Hearn suffered a fall at his home in Encino, Los Angeles, and struck his head causing serious injury. Three days later, on August 5, 2002, he died of his injury. He was 85. He was interred in the Holy Cross Cemetery in Culver City, California, next to his son Gary and his daughter Samantha. Chick and Marge would have celebrated their 64th wedding anniversary on August 13, 2002.

== Honors ==
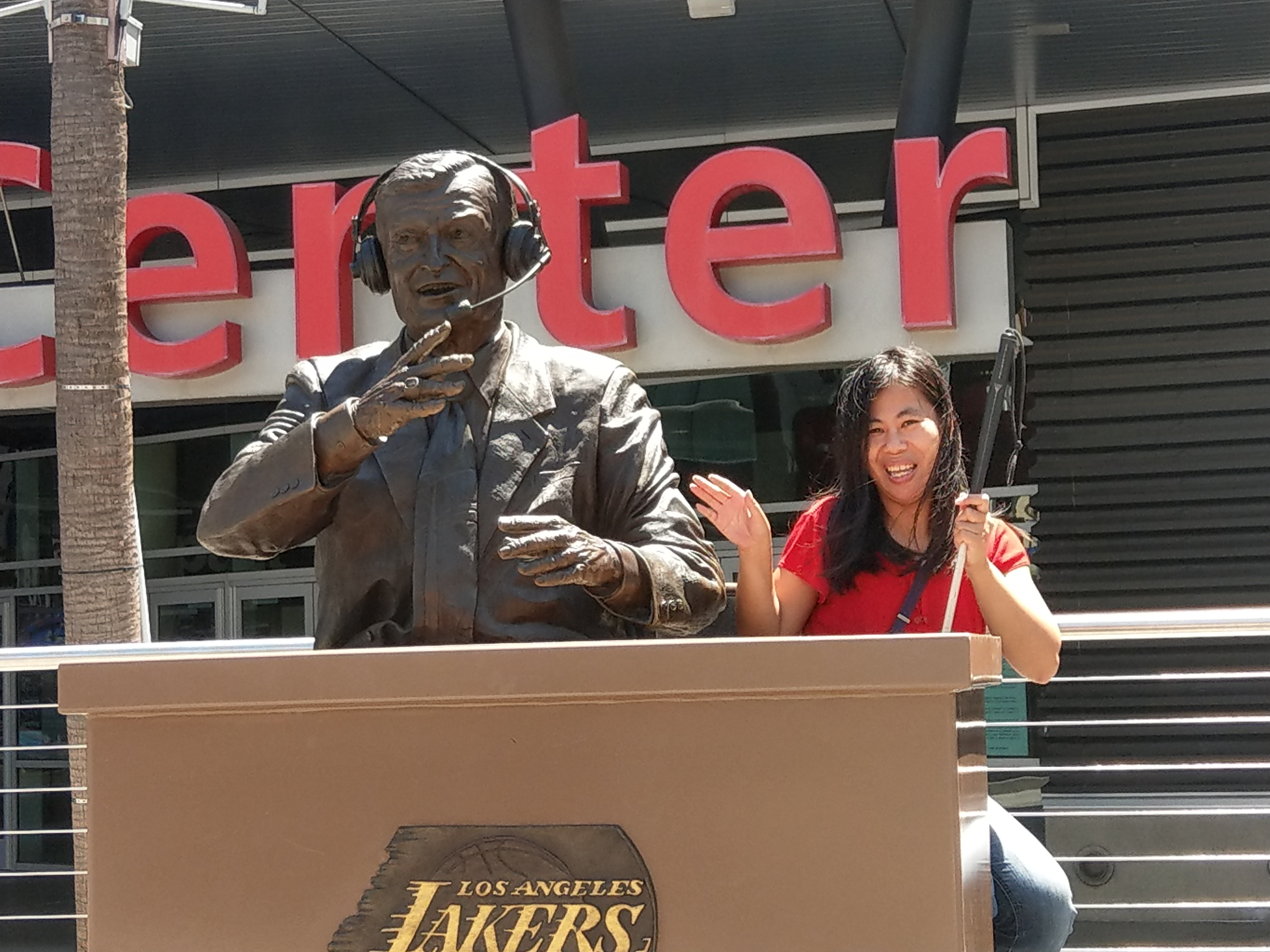
Statue of Chick Hearn, 2018-07-20, at Staples Center

On May 9, 1991, Hearn became the third broadcaster to win the Gowdy Award from the Naismith Memorial Basketball Hall of Fame in Springfield, Massachusetts. He later became the first broadcaster inducted into the Hall in 2003. In 1995, he was voted to be the 20th member of the American Sportscaster Hall of Fame by his fellow sportscasters. He was inducted by the National Sportscasters and Sportswriters Association Hall of Fame in 1997.

In honor of his contributions to the Los Angeles Lakers, both the Lakers and the city of Los Angeles renamed a portion of West 11th Street between Figueroa Street and Georgia Street (now L.A. Live Way) to Chick Hearn Court. This street currently runs alongside Crypto.com Arena's main entrance. The Los Angeles County Metropolitan Transportation Authority further honored the broadcaster by changing the name of the nearby A and E line station to "Pico/Chick Hearn". His name was later hung from the rafters of the Staples Center, alongside the retired numbers of past Lakers players, though with a microphone in place of a number.

Hearn also has a star on the Hollywood Walk of Fame, in radio. Hearn's star is located at 6755 Hollywood Blvd.

On April 27, 2010, Hearn was honored with a bronze statue at Star Plaza outside Staples Center. A chair next to Hearn's statue behind the desk with the Lakers' logo is a part of the statue so his fans can sit down to have their pictures taken.

== On-air style and demeanor ==
Hearn was notable for his focus on calling play-by-play. He did not chitchat while the game was in motion. He was able to report clearly and rapidly, which he considered a gift. This style was especially well-suited for his notable simulcasts of Lakers games on television and radio, which were a tradition during his 40-plus year tenure. He was especially appreciated on radio because listening to the broadcast was almost like watching the game. Shortly after Hearn's departure, the simulcasts were ended, with some listeners complaining that his successor, Paul Sunderland, was difficult to follow for radio listeners. Sometimes this style made it difficult for his partners to get a word in edgewise; his seven-year color commentator, Keith Erickson, fondly reminisced at a ceremony commemorating Hearn: "Not being able to talk for eight years [as his partner], I thought this was a great opportunity to share a bit". He was formal, always referring to the Lakers' former owner as "Mr. Cooke" and the owner for much of his tenure, Jerry Buss by his full title – Dr. Jerry Buss or Dr. Buss.

== Chickisms ==
The particular phrases that Hearn used during his broadcasts were labeled "Chickisms". Many are staples of basketball. When a book of his memoirs was published in 2004, it included an audio CD with the calls as well as a Chick Hearn Rap-Around rap song created with the samples.

- 20 foot lay-up: A jump shot by Jamaal Wilkes.
- And that one came down wet: A very high arch "rainbow" shot is made, like the ball went through the clouds.
- (The) Bank is open: A poorly guarded bank shot from the side.
- (He sent that one back) Air-mail Special!: A strongly blocked shot, often sent high into the stands.
- Bloooows the layup! : Missed a very easy layup.
- Bloooows a cripple!: Missed an easy shot.
- Boo-birds: Fans who boo their own team when they play badly.
- (He did the) bunny hop in the pea patch: He was called for traveling.
- (You could) call it with Braille: An easy call for an official, e.g. a blatant foul.
- (He got) caught with his hand in the cookie jar: A reaching foul.
- (The) charity stripe: The free throw line.
- (That player is in) civilians: The player is not in uniform.
- (He's got 'em) covered like the rug on your floor: Really good one-on-one defense.
- (They) couldn't beat the Sisters of Mercy: The team is getting beat badly.
- (They) couldn't throw a pea into the ocean: The team's shooting is really awful.
- (It'll) count if it goes ...: A player that is fouled in the act of shooting, or alternatively gets off a shot just before the buzzer sounded. It go-o-o-oes!: The shot is successful.
- ...decides to join the party: a player coming up the floor late on offense.
- (That shot) didn't draw iron: A shot which misses the rim, but hits the backboard. Sometimes he would add but it drew a lot of flies.
- Dime store score: A 10–5 score.
- Dribble-drive: A player drives the basket while dribbling.
- Finger roll: A shot where the ball rolls off the shooter's fingers.
- First lead since they got off the bus: First lead of the game.
- (He) fly-swatted (that one): A shot blocked with force and authority.
- Football score: A score resembling one often seen in a football game (e.g., 21–14).
- (He threw up a) frozen rope: A shot with a very flat trajectory.
- (We're) high above the western sideline: Chick's perch at the Forum, from which he called his "word's eye view" of the game.
- Hippity-hops the dribble: A player dribbling the ball does a little hop step.
- I'll bet you an ice cream: Hearn and Keith Erickson (his one-time color commentator) often bet ice creams on the outcome of a shot or game.
- (He's got) ice-water in his veins: When a player hits a clutch free throw.
- (It's) First and ten: Multiple players are sprawled on the floor after a physical play or diving for the ball.
- (It's) garbage time: The (often sloppily played) final minutes when reserve players get a chance to play in a game that's out of reach (after it is in the refrigerator).
- (In & out,) heart-brrrreak!: A shot that appears to go in, but rattles off the rim and misses. Sometimes it went in so far you could read the Commissioner's name from below.
- He has two chances, slim and none, and slim just left the building: The player has no chance of success with this play.
- If that goes in, I'm walking home: Similar to a prayer, when the opponent shoots a shot that is a prayer, a streak, or some amazing shot. (Usually on the road)
- Leapin' Lena: A shot made while the player is in the air and off balance.
- Marge could have made that shot: A missed shot that was so easy, Hearn's wife Marge could have made it. Marge was often referred to when a player messed up something that was easy.
- Matador Defense: Poor defense that allows their opponent to drive uncontested through the lane to the basket.
- (There are) lots of referees in the building, only 3 getting paid: The entire crowd acts as though they are the officials by disagreeing with a call.
- (Like a) motorcycle in a motordrome: Ball spins several times around the inside of the rim, then drops through or goes "in & out".
- Too much mustard on the hot dog: Describing a player attempting an unnecessarily showy, flashy play.
- The mustard's off the hot dog: A player attempts an unnecessarily showy, flashy play which ends up in a turnover or otherwise unsuccessful, such as a missed dunk.
- My grandmother could guard him, and she can't go to her left!: Said of a slow, out of shape, or hurt player.
- Nervous time: When the final moments of a game are pressure-packed.
- 94-by-50 hunk of wood: The basketball court, based on the floor's dimensions. (Attacking 47 feet: The front court.)
- No harm, no foul (no blood, no ambulance, no stitches): A no-call by an official when varying degrees of contact have occurred. (More adjectives means the non-call was more questionable.)
- Not Phi Beta Kappa: Not a smart play.
- ...Since Hector was a pup A very long time (e.g., the Lakers haven't had the lead since Hector was a pup.)
- He's in the Popcorn Machine (with butter and salt all over him): Meaning that a defender got faked into the air (and out of play) by an offensive player's pump fake. ("Popcorn Machine" is a reference to an actual popcorn machine in the old Los Angeles Sports Arena, which was near the basket, but far from the court. Thus, if the player went far out of play, he was in the "popcorn machine.") When Hearn guest starred as a mouse in the Garfield and Friends episode Basket Brawl, Odie literally runs into a popcorn machine.
- (He's) on him like a postage stamp: Very tight defense.
- Picks up the garbage and takes it to the dump: Picks up a loose ball and scores.
- Pulling a Larson: A particularly inelegant play.
- Rock the baby: An amazing slam dunk, in a regular season game in 1983, that Julius Erving scored over Michael Cooper.
- Somebody left the window open: Somebody misses an outside shot, badly.
- Seventeen five-oh-five, standing at the Forum: When a play drew universal acclaim (17,505 was the seating capacity for the Inglewood Forum)
- Slam dunk!: Hearn's most famous phrase; a powerful shot where a player forces the ball through the rim with one or both hands.
- (He was) standing there, combing his hair: When a player uninvolved with the action comes up with the ball and gets an easy shot.
- (He) takes him to the third floor and leaves him at the mezzanine: A move where an offensive player pump-fakes a defender and draws a foul from the leaping player.
- Tattoo dribble: A player dribbling the ball while not moving, as though tattooing the floor with the ball, as he waits for the play to develop.
- This game's in the refrigerator: the door is closed, the lights are out, the eggs are cooling, the butter's getting hard and the Jell-O's jigglin'!: The game's outcome is set; only the final score is in question. Chick's variation on "the game's on ice." (Reportedly, he set a record for the earliest he's ever said this during the February 4, 1987 game against the Sacramento Kings, who were down 40–4 after the first quarter.)
- Throws up a 5 footer, misses by 3: When a player throws up a close shot and misses by a lot.
- Throws up a brick: When a player tosses up a particularly errant shot, particularly one that bounces off the front of the rim.
- Throws up a prayer (...it's (or isn't) answered!!!): A wild shot that will need a miracle to score (and does or doesn't).
- Ticky-tack: A foul called when very little contact has been made.
- (On his) wallet: A player fell on his rear end. When Lynn Shackleford, color man 1970–77, who liked to sass his rather straitlaced senior partner, remarked once that a player had landed on his backside, Hearn admonished him in all seriousness, "That's his wallet."
- Words-eye view: What listeners received while listening to Hearn call the game on the radio.
- (He's) working on his Wrigleys. A player is chewing gum.
- (Passes over to) Wouldn't You?: A player passes the ball over to a player who's very hot at the time.
- (He's) yo-yo-ing up and down: A player dribbles in one place as if he were playing with a yo-yo on a string.
- (He's dribbling) left to right (or right to left) across your dial: To let people who were listening to radio know which direction the ball was going up the court.
- (He's) alone, he sets, he fires, he gets!: Player not defended who stops, sets and shoots.
- Fall Back Baby, she's in there!: Said of a made shot by Lakers player Dick Barnett whose nickname was 'Fall Back Baby'.

=== Nicknames for Lakers players ===
- Kareem Abdul-Jabbar: Cap, The Captain, Big Fella
- Kobe Bryant: The Kid
- Keith Wilkes: Silk
- Cedric Ceballos: Garbage Man
- Michael Cooper: Coop, Secretary of Defense
- Vlade Divac: The Old Serb
- Derek Fisher: Fish, D-Fish, The Bulldog
- Rick Fox: Foxy
- Magic Johnson: The Magic Man, Buck, Mag
- Eddie Jones: Fast Eddie, Steady Eddie, The Pickpocket, No Sweat Eddie
- Eddie Jordan: Thief
- Jim McMillian: Jimmy Mac
- Norm Nixon: Stormin' Norman
- Shaquille O'Neal: Big Fella
- Sam Perkins: Smooth
- Pat Riley: Riles
- Kurt Rambis: Clark Kent; Superman: (because of his safety glasses)
- Byron Scott: Rook
- Elmore Smith: The Rejector
- Sedale Threatt: The Thief of Baghdad
- Nick Van Exel: Nick the Quick, Nick at Nite
- James Worthy: Big Game James
- Jerry West: Zeke from Cabin Creek

== Memorable calls ==
And the crowd stands for Kareem to get the ball. Everybody's waving their arms...it's in to Kareem. Kareem swing left...right-hand twelve-footer...GOOD!

— -calling Kareem Abdul-Jabbar's NBA record 31,420th point, pushing him past Wilt Chamberlain as the league's all-time leading scorer.

The new king of scoring has ascended his throne.

— -Shortly after Kareem's record-breaking basket.

37–2, ladies and gentlemen. If you're just tuning in, no, I haven't been using any of the squeezing of the grape.

— -referring to the Lakers' colossal lead on the Sacramento Kings during the first quarter of a game between the teams on February 4, 1987.

To the left goes Magic...he's got it. He didn't shoot it...five seconds left. Magic down the middle, just what I thought. A hook shot at twelve, GOOD! Two seconds left! The Lakers take the lead on Magic Johnson's running sky-hook! Hooie!

— -calling Magic Johnson's "junior sky-hook" in Game 4 of the 1987 NBA Finals.

Kobe's down the middle, he's in deep. Throws to Shaq... SLA-A-AM DUNK! Portland can put the champagne away and get out the bottled water, 'cause that's all they're gonna drink on their way home!

— -calling the Lakers' comeback against the Portland Trail Blazers in Game 7 of the 2000 Western Conference Finals.
