= Swine Trek =

Swine Trek is

- the spacecraft in Pigs in Space,
- an episode of Garfield and Friends, see List of Garfield and Friends episodes#Season 2 (1989).
