= U.S. Acres =

Comic strip

- U.S. Acres logo featuring the strip's main character Orson
- Author(s): Jim Davis; Brett Koth
- Owner: Paws, Inc.
- Current status/schedule: Concluded
- Launch date: March 3, 1986
- End date: Original print run ended May 7, 1989. Reruns ran on Garfield.com from 2010 to 2020.
- Alternate name(s): Orson's Place (Canada); Orson's Farm (international)
- Syndicate: United Feature Syndicate
- Genre: Humor
- Preceded by: Garfield (1978–present)

U.S. Acres (also known as Orson's Farm internationally and Orson's Place in Canada) is an American comic strip that ran in newspapers from 1986 to 1989, created by Jim Davis, author of the comic strip Garfield. The strip was centered on a group of barnyard animals, with the main character being Orson, a small pig who had been taken from his mother shortly after being born.

U.S. Acres was launched on March 3, 1986, in a then-unprecedented 505 newspapers by United Feature Syndicate. Most papers only ran the Sunday strip, usually on the same page as Garfield. For most of the last year of the strip's existence, Brett Koth, who had been assisting Davis on Garfield at that time, was given co-creator's credit in the strip, and signed his name to the strips along with Davis.

At the peak of the comic's popularity, there were children's books, plush animals (particularly of the characters Orson, Roy, Wade, Booker, Sheldon, and Cody), and posters of the main characters. Shirts, mugs, mousepads, and keychains of the characters would later be available. An animated adaptation was included in the TV show Garfield and Friends (1988–1994) as a spin-off segment, and continued to be so for several years after the strip ended. The final daily strip was printed on April 15, 1989, while the final Sunday appeared on May 7, 1989.

The strip was relaunched as an online webcomic on October 1, 2010, and was announced the day before in a question and answer column in USA Today. Later, in celebration of the strip's 24th anniversary, the U.S. Acres strips prior to August 1, 1986 were released on Garfield.com. On August 7, 2016, a Garfield comic strip showed the U.S. Acres gang (sans Bo and Blue) in its logo box, featuring Garfield eating a bag of chicken feed.

In August 2019, Jim Davis sold the rights to U.S. Acres to Paramount Global (formerly ViacomCBS) as part of its acquisition of Paws, Inc.

== Characters ==
The primary traits of the strip's main characters were established during the run of the comic strip, even down to such visual gags as the head on Wade's inner tube having the same facial expression as Wade himself.

=== Primary characters ===
==== Orson Pig ====
Orson Pig: A good-natured yet naïve pig whose work ethic makes him the functional leader. His good humor being tested is one of the common gags in the cartoons. Originally, Orson had long eyelashes (to represent him as a young piglet); they disappeared on December 31, 1987 (permanently on January 3, 1988). Booker and Sheldon called him Mom (though it was inconsistent because at other times they just call him Orson). Being the runt of his litter, Orson's original owner intended to get rid of him. Orson fell from the pick-up taking him away from his birthplace and moved to an unnamed farm, where he was later found by a farm girl who persuaded Orson to follow her to her father's farm. Orson's alter-ego is a costumed superhero named Power Pig, which more often than not causes his friends or adversaries to fall down laughing at him. Orson loves books, but is very influenced by them, by sometimes doing what's in the book. Sometimes when Orson reads a book, particularly a scary one, the stuff he reads about usually appears behind him and scares the others away. While Orson has a mixed relationship with Roy in the strip, in the cartoon series he has a somewhat strong bond with him and is a lot more forgiving of his pranks.

==== Roy Rooster ====
Roy Rooster: A loud, wisecracking rooster who endlessly enjoys practical jokes with Orson and Wade being his favorite targets. With a few exceptions, he is tolerated because his job of waking up everyone and 'tending' to the chickens is important, but he does his best to avoid labor whenever possible. In the cartoon, he is far kinder, friendlier and more well-liked by the others and is often the one to defeat the series' antagonists such as Orson's brothers. In spite of his lazy nature, Roy has proven to be a very capable protector of the chickens, coolly outsmarting and defeating the predators, such as the Weasel and the Fox (both of whom try to kidnap them) with a series of practical jokes and gags. He is also serious about being a cartoon star and does whatever he can to remain in the spotlight. Even though he is a jerk and insults everyone, Roy is not a bully and doesn’t really mean any harm. His and Wade's beaks are repeatedly shown to be removable. He is allergic to flowers, a fact that was first established in a strip published on July 2, 1986.

==== Booker ====
Booker: A chick named by Orson for his love of books. Booker and Sheldon were still eggs when Orson found them abandoned and decided to hatch them. Booker is extremely adventurous and (over) confident despite his small size. He often chases worms but can never seem to catch them. In the comic, he often addressed Orson as "Mom".

==== Sheldon ====
Sheldon: Booker's twin brother, who decided not to hatch. He becomes very philosophical and introspective over the course of the strip, and begins musing on his "Sanctum Sanctorum" (a small mound of grass). A recurring gag has him describe his shell as the perfect living space, which is never shown.

==== Wade Duck ====
Wade Duck: The "cowardly craven duck" of the farm. His good nature is sometimes shadowed by his overwhelming hypochondria and panphobia. He is always seen wearing an inner tube, which (as part of a continuous running gag) has a duck head in front of it that shares the same facial expressions as Wade – even down to the direction in which he is looking. His and Roy's beaks are repeatedly shown to be removable. He lost his fears as part of his final appearance on April 12, 1989.

==== Bo Sheep ====
Bo Sheep: A sheep who is unintelligent and perky. In the TV series, he is not usually bright but always calm, cool, collected, dependable, and a skillful cook who speaks with a Southern Californian dialect. A common gag in the television series involves Bo and Lanolin constantly arguing, sometimes even about the fact that they are arguing.

==== Lanolin Sheep ====
Lanolin Sheep: Bo's twin sister, who is usually shown as a hard worker, but with a personality the polar opposite of her brother: loud and disagreeable. She is named after the grease produced by wool-bearing animals, such as sheep. While she is quite abrasive in the television series, especially towards Bo, in that she is nearly always arguing with him, but also towards Roy for his laziness, in the comic strip, she is much more abrasive towards everyone else in general.

=== Secondary characters ===
- Filbert: A worm Booker often chases, but with no success. He lives in a hole with his wife Estelle and their son Willy.
- Cody: A puppy who takes pleasure in chasing the barnyard's animals and trying to maul them. He was eventually removed from the strip on September 13, 1988 without any explanation and does not appear in Garfield and Friends.
- Blue: A blue cat who is friends with Cody and keeps him in line. She disappeared from the strip after March 28, 1988, and, like Cody, is not present in Garfield and Friends.
- Mort, Gort, & Wart: Orson's three larger, meaner brothers who play a much bigger role in the animated series than in the comic strip, where they are unnamed. They stopped appearing in the strip after Orson was taken away from his mother. They constantly torment Orson and in the animated series, they are frequent burglars of the farm's crops and the main antagonists. Their leitmotif in the series samples the melody of the classical piece "In the Hall of the Mountain King".
- Max the Skateboarding Bird: An eccentric, flightless bird that first appears as a mysterious creature in a wall to whom Wade speaks on October 13, 1986. Jim Davis solicited ideas from readers (specifically children) as to what they thought the creature might be. On March 3, 1987, Davis revealed his choice in the strip. Max does not appear again following the week.

== Comic strip collections ==
Five comic strip collections were published, by Topper Books of New York City.

1. Davis, Jim (1987). U.S. Acres Goes Half Hog!. Topper Books. ISBN 0-345-34392-1. (1986-03-03 through 1986-10-04)
2. Davis, Jim (1987). U.S. Acres Counts its Chickens. Topper Books. ISBN 0-345-34881-8. (1986-10-05 through (1987-05-09)
3. Davis, Jim (1988). U.S. Acres Rules the Roost. Topper Books. ISBN 0-88687-341-X. (1987-05-10 through 1987-12-13)
4. Davis, Jim (1989). U.S. Acres Runs Amuck. Topper Books. ISBN 0-88687-437-8. (1987-12-14 through 1988-07-17)
5. Davis, Jim (1989). U.S. Acres Hams it Up. Topper Books. ISBN 0-88687-469-6. (1988-07-18 through 1989-02-18)

Also, at least six comic strip collections were published by Berkley Books of New York City. However, some of these books are missing months of the strip and / or have strips out of order.

1. Davis, Jim (1989). U.S. Acres: I Wasn't Hatched Yesterday. Berkley Books.
2. Davis, Jim (1989). U.S. Acres: It's a Pig's Life. Berkley Books. ISBN 0-425-11833-9. (1986-05-24 through 1987-08-16)
3. Davis, Jim (1989). U.S. Acres: Hold that Duck!. Berkley Books. ISBN 0-425-11877-0. (1986-08-18 through 1986-11-03)
4. Davis, Jim (1990). U.S. Acres: Rise and Shine!. Berkley Books.
5. Davis, Jim (1990). U.S. Acres: Try Counting Sheep. Berkley Books.
6. Davis, Jim (1990). U.S. Acres: Take This Rooster, Please!. Berkley Books. ISBN 0-425-12007-4. (1987-04-14 through 1987-05-09, 1987-12-14 through 1988-02-08)

The final two months of U.S. Acres were not published as part of an American collection. The last U.S. Acres collection was published in England as a mass-market paperback, titled Orson's Farm Cuts the Corn. The collection, which has since gone out of print along with the rest of the U.S. Acres books, contains fifty-nine of the final sixty strips (one Sunday strip was not printed) and is the rarest of any U.S. Acres/Orson's Farm collection.

=== Children's books ===
- Davis, Jim (1988). U.S. Acres: The Great Christmas Contest. Story written by Jim Kraft, illustrated by Paws, Inc. Bantam Books. ISBN 0-553-05807-X.
- Kraft, Jim (1989). U.S. Acres: Let's Play Ball. Illustrated by Paws, Inc. Bantam Books. ISBN 0-553-34627-X.
- Kraft, Jim (1989). U.S. Acres: Sir Orson to the Rescue. Designed and illustrated by Brett Koth, Betsy Brackett, Thomas Howard, Dwight Ferris, and Dan Hasket. Bantam Books. ISBN 0-553-34765-9.
- Kraft, Jim (1989). U.S. Acres: Beware! Rooster at Work. Designed and illustrated by Brett Koth, Betsy Brackett, Thomas Howard, Dwight Ferris, and Dan Hasket. Bantam Books. ISBN 0-553-34766-7.
- Kraft, Jim (1989). U.S. Acres: The Big Camp-Out. Designed and illustrated by Betsy Brackett, Larry Fentz, Dwight Ferris, Dan Haskett and Brett Koth. Bantam Books.
- Wade Dives In
- Kraft, Jim (1989). A Most Special Easter Egg. Illustrated by Paws, Inc. Bantam Books.
- Kraft, Jim (1990). U.S. Acres: Booker Meets the Easter Bunny. Designed by Brett Koth. Illustrated by Brett Koth, Dwight Ferris, and Thomas Howard. Random House Children's Books. ISBN 0-553-34831-0.
- Wade's Haunted Halloween (from 1990)
- Happy Birthday, Sheldon
