= GarfieldEats =

Canadian ghost restaurant

- Founded: 21 June 2019
- Defunct: 23 December 2021

GarfieldEats was a ghost restaurant themed after the Garfield franchise. It was founded in 2018 by Nathen Mazri and Pascal Haider. The restaurant had locations in Dubai, U.A.E.; Toronto, Ontario; and London, Ontario. The Toronto location closed on November 9, 2020, due to the COVID-19 pandemic and a dispute over rent; an earlier dispute that year resulted in the restaurant closing temporarily. It has since been reduced to a frozen foods brand, selling only "Big Cow" Lasagnas.

GarfieldEats featured entries such as lasagna (the title character's favorite food), Garfield-shaped pizza, "Garficcinos", smoothies, and Garfield-shaped dark chocolate bars. Customers could order food by using mobile phones attached to a restaurant's walls; or the GarfieldEats phone app for delivery. The app also allowed customers to play games and to watch episodes of Garfield and Friends.

The restaurant's slogan, "Love Me, Feed Me, Don't Leave Me", was based on the Garfield quote "Love me, feed me, never leave me"; Nathen Mazri was particularly inspired by its appearance in Garfield: The Movie. Mazri and Garfield creator Jim Davis have described GarfieldEats as "entergaging" (a portmanteau of "entertaining" and "engaging").

After continuous struggles to pay their landlord and general unprofitability, GarfieldEats shut down in the winter of 2021.
