= Statue of Chick Hearn =

Sculptures in Los Angeles, California, U.S.

- The sculpture in 2022
- Subject: Chick Hearn
- Location: Los Angeles, California, U.S.; 34°2′37.3″N 118°15′58.9″W

A statue of sportscaster Chick Hearn by Julie Rotblatt Amrany and Omri Amrany is installed outside Los Angeles' Crypto.com Arena, in the U.S. state of California. The bronze and steel sculpture was unveiled in 2010. An empty chair is provided next to the statue to allow people to sit in for a picture taking.
