= List of Garfield and Friends episodes =

Garfield and Friends is an American animated television series that aired on CBS from September 17, 1988, to December 10, 1994, for a total of 121 half-hour episodes (363 segments) over seven seasons.

== Series overview ==
Season	Segments	Episodes	Originally released	
Season	Segments	Episodes	First released	Last released
1	39	13	September 17, 1988	December 10, 1988
2	78	26	September 16, 1989	December 16, 1989
3	54	18	September 15, 1990	November 17, 1990
4	48	16	September 14, 1991	November 9, 1991
5	48	16	September 19, 1992	November 7, 1992
6	48	16	September 18, 1993	November 6, 1993
7	48	16	September 17, 1994	December 10, 1994
Crossover			April 21, 1990	

== Episodes ==
Episode key

- Garfield: Orange
- U.S. Acres: Green

=== Season 1 (1988) ===
No. overall	No. in season	Title	Original release date	Prod. code
1	1	"Peace & Quiet"	September 17, 1988	101
1	1	"Wanted: Wade"	September 17, 1988	101
1	1	"Garfield Goes Hawaiian"	September 17, 1988	101
"Peace & Quiet": After staying up all night watching TV, Garfield tries to get some sleep. Binky the Clown mistakenly believes that he is meant to sing a birthday song at Garfield's address, and refuses to leave until he can perform. "Wanted: Wade": Wade believes that the police will arrest him after he rips the tag off the bottom of a couch. "Garfield Goes Hawaiian": Garfield is diagnosed with the Hawaiian Cat Flu, an unusual disease that causes him to dance the hula whenever somebody mentions Hawaii or anything Hawaiian. Jon uses Garfield's ailment to win money on a TV show featuring funny animal stunts.
2	2	"Box O' Fun"	September 24, 1988	105
2	2	"Unidentified Flying Orson"	September 24, 1988	105
2	2	"School Daze"	September 24, 1988	105
"Box O' Fun": Garfield plays in a cardboard box, imagining himself driving a race car and flying an airplane. When Odie joins, he and Garfield imagine themselves stranded in the ocean. "Unidentified Flying Orson": Roy takes advantage of Orson's overactive imagination to pretend that Earth is being invaded by aliens that resemble cheese danishes. While most of the farm panics, Lanolin investigates Roy's prank. "School Daze": After Garfield is mean to Nermal, Jon sends him to a strict obedience school, where he is treated as a prisoner.
3	3	"Nighty Nightmare"	October 1, 1988	103
3	3	"Banana Nose"	October 1, 1988	103
3	3	"Ode to Odie"	October 1, 1988	103
"Nighty Nightmare": Overeating leads Garfield to have a nightmare that his appetite runs out of control, prompting him to balloon into a massive, insatiable giant. The military is eventually called in to continue feeding him. "Banana Nose": When Roy accuses the others of not being able to take a joke, they begin to call him "Banana Nose", which hurts his feelings to the point where he leaves the farm. When he relies on his sense of smell to save Booker from a trap, he gains appreciation of his nose. "Ode to Odie": In a poem rapped by Garfield, Odie wanders around the neighborhood and meets a tough dog named Butch and his flunkies.
4	4	"Fraidy Cat"	October 8, 1988	104
4	4	"Shell Shocked Sheldon"	October 8, 1988	104
4	4	"Nothing to Sneeze At"	October 8, 1988	104
"Fraidy Cat": Garfield watches a horror movie during a thunderstorm while Jon goes out shopping. The electricity goes out and Garfield thinks Jon has been captured by a monster. "Shell Shocked Sheldon": Orson and Booker think that it is time for Sheldon to hatch, so Orson sits on him for a night. A fox comes and kidnaps Sheldon while Orson is away. "Nothing to Sneeze At": While Jon goes on a date with Liz, Garfield's allergies act up, and he cannot find out what is making him sneeze.
5	5	"Moving Experience"	October 15, 1988	102
5	5	"Wade: You're Afraid"	October 15, 1988	102
5	5	"Good Mousekeeping"	October 15, 1988	102
"Moving Experience": Garfield feels mistreated by Jon, so he looks for a new home. A rich girl finds him and takes him to her giant manor. "Wade: You're Afraid": Orson uses a psychology book to hypnotize Wade into being "the bravest duck in the world." However, Wade begins to act extremely reckless, to the point of disturbing a large bull. "Good Mousekeeping": A mouse named Floyd realizes Garfield does not chase mice, so he informs a mouse clan about the situation. They end up invading the house.
6	6	"Identity Crisis"	October 22, 1988	106
6	6	"The Bad Sport"	October 22, 1988	106
6	6	"Up a Tree"	October 22, 1988	106
"Identity Crisis": Garfield is kicked out of a pet shop and encounters Floyd, along with a dog being chased by a dimwitted animal catcher. The three animals show each other their imitations of the other's sounds (Garfield barks, Floyd meows, and the dog squeaks), and the trick helps them evade the animal catcher from the pound. "The Bad Sport": The gang is bored, so Orson inspires them to play a game called "Pig Ball" that he found in an old book. Roy pranks the group by making a list of ridiculous rules and swapping them with the real ones. "Up a Tree": Nermal visits Garfield's house and Garfield gets jealous of the attention the kitten receives. Garfield ends up climbing a tree, eventually becoming too scared to come back down.
7	7	"Weighty Problem"	October 29, 1988	107
7	7	"The Worm Turns"	October 29, 1988	107
7	7	"Good Cat, Bad Cat"	October 29, 1988	107
"Weighty Problem": Jon buys a new talking scale that insults Garfield, prompting the fat cat to tamper with it so it will report Jon as overweight. The prank backfires when Jon begins a strict diet and exercise program, dragging Garfield along. "The Worm Turns": Orson narrates a story about how the worm chasing-obsessed Booker turned over a new leaf. "Good Cat, Bad Cat": When Jon tells Garfield to behave himself, Garfield's conscience manifests as his "good" and "bad" side. The angelic former tries to encourage him to do good deeds, while the demonic latter tempts him into destruction and pranks.
8	8	"Cabin Fever"	November 5, 1988	108
8	8	"Return of Power Pig"	November 5, 1988	108
8	8	"Fair Exchange"	November 5, 1988	108
"Cabin Fever": Jon, Garfield, and Odie vacation in a cabin. While Jon goes to buy groceries, Garfield and Odie are snowed inside the cabin without food. "Return of Power Pig": Orson reads "Humpty Dumpty" aloud to Sheldon, who is terrified of the poem. Booker misinterprets his panic, and everyone on the farm embellishes what they hear from one another until a rumor of a nearby monster runs rampant. "Fair Exchange": Garfield and Jon each think the other has a much easier life. They have a shared dream that evening where they switch roles and heads, with Jon as a mischief-making cat and Garfield as his long-suffering human owner.
9	9	"The Binky Show"	November 12, 1988	109
9	9	"Keeping Cool"	November 12, 1988	109
9	9	"Don't Move!"	November 12, 1988	109
"The Binky Show": To win Jon a birthday present, Garfield goes on a game show titled "Name That Fish", hosted by Binky the Clown. "Keeping Cool": Orson is terrified of the fact that his mean older brothers are coming to visit him. Bo teaches him the philosophy of keeping cool under pressure. This is Mort, Gort, and Wart's first appearances. "Don't Move!": Garfield wanders into a fish shop to eat, telling Odie to sit on an X drawn on the sidewalk and not move. Odie then gets caught by the dog catcher, which results in an unusual trip around the city.
10	10	"Magic Mutt"	November 19, 1988	110
10	10	"Short Story"	November 19, 1988	110
10	10	"Monday Misery"	November 19, 1988	110
"Magic Mutt": When Jon is asked to perform a magic show at a children's hospital, he goes to a local shop to buy some new tricks. Garfield tags along and makes an enemy of Merlin, the owner's dog. They begin to fight using the various magical devices in the store. "Short Story": Booker wants more responsibility on the farm but is told that he is too short. After Orson's brothers try to steal the crops and trap everyone in a silo, Booker is the only one small enough to escape and save the rest of them. "Monday Misery": Garfield tries to find a way to avoid dealing with the usual bad luck that happens to him on Monday.
11	11	"Best of Breed"	November 26, 1988	111
11	11	"National Tapioca Pudding Day"	November 26, 1988	111
11	11	"All About Odie"	November 26, 1988	111
"Best of Breed": When Garfield gets jealous of Nermal's awards, he enters a cat talent show, where he is coincidentally up against Nermal. "National Tapioca Pudding Day": As part of a prank, Roy claims that it is "National Tapioca Pudding Day." Orson shares gifts with people while telling them about the fake holiday. "All About Odie": After noticing that Odie receives more fan mail than he does, Garfield presents a documentary-like presentation on Odie to please his audience.
12	12	"Caped Avenger"	December 3, 1988	112
12	12	"Shy Fly Guy"	December 3, 1988	112
12	12	"Green Thumbs Down"	December 3, 1988	112
"Caped Avenger": While a cartoon expert comes to review some of Jon's characters, Garfield's alter ego, the Caped Avenger, searches for Pooky, who has gone missing. "Shy Fly Guy": Wade's cousin, Fred, visits the farm to fly with Wade and laughs at the fact that Wade is afraid to fly. Wade makes a resolution to learn to fly by the end of the winter. "Green Thumbs Down": Jon vows to grow his own food in a garden after noticing the high cost of groceries. Garfield's hunger leads him to try to rush the process, causing trouble, they later are forced to battle a gopher.
13	13	"Forget Me Not"	December 10, 1988	113
13	13	"I Like Having You Around!"	December 10, 1988	113
13	13	"Sales Resistance"	December 10, 1988	113
"Forget Me Not": Garfield is hit on the head by a pie tin carelessly flung in the air after an argument with a stray dog who stole his pie and gets amnesia. Jon and Odie try their best to jog his memory. Garfield (with his memory gone) tries to give his lasagna away to the same stray dog who hassled him earlier, much to the confusion (and eventual terror) of said dog. "I Like Having You Around!": Orson writes in his diary about Bo leaving the farm after fighting with his sister Lanolin. Lanolin acts unconcerned, while Orson knows better. "Sales Resistance": Due to Garfield's habit of ordering worthless things from TV infomercials, Jon threatens to stop feeding him lasagna if he buys another item.

=== Season 2 (1989) ===
No. overall	No. in season	Title	Original release date	Prod. code
14	1	"Pest of a Guest"	September 16, 1989	201
14	1	"The Impractical Joker"	September 16, 1989	201
14	1	"Fat and Furry"	September 16, 1989	201
"Pest of a Guest": Jon takes in a weak stray cat, prompting Garfield to become envious of all of the attention the guest is receiving. The stray cat is nothing but a con artist trying to get Garfield kicked out of here. With the new cat taking advantage of Jon's hospitality, Garfield sets out to make him leave. "The Impractical Joker": Orson fires Roy after he insults all of the animals with mean jokes. In an attempt to bring back Roy, the animals suggest hiring Wade's cousin Fred Duck, whose behavior is worse than Roy's. "Fat and Furry": Garfield purchases a lottery ticket at the supermarket which proves to be a winner. He, Jon, and Odie enjoy living the high life, including having their new mansion explored on a television program about wealthy people. Guest voice: Robin Leach as the TV host, in a parody of Leach's real-life job hosting Lifestyles of the Rich and Famous.
15	2	"Rip Van Kitty"	September 16, 1989	202
15	2	"Grabbity"	September 16, 1989	202
15	2	"The Big Catnap"	September 16, 1989	202
"Rip Van Kitty": After Garfield torments Nermal & Odie for disturbing his napping, Jon scolds him for his laziness. Garfield then dreams about sleeping for twenty years and awakening on a futuristic Earth, which is invaded by aliens that look exactly like Garfield. "Grabbity": Roy plays a prank on Wade, who is worried about the law of gravity (or "grabbity", as Roy pronounces it) getting repealed. "The Big Catnap": It is Jon's birthday, and his mother has sent him a batch of his favorite cookies. Jon tells the mailman about the many times Garfield has stolen the sweets on past birthdays and vows to enjoy them for himself this year.
16	3	"The Great Getaway"	September 23, 1989	203
16	3	"Scrambled Eggs"	September 23, 1989	203
16	3	"Hansel and Garfield"	September 23, 1989	203
"The Great Getaway": Jon visits New York City on a trip, unaware that Garfield has snuck along. When Garfield discovers that Jon's date is a pickpocket, he tries to protect his owner wherever he goes. "Scrambled Eggs": Orson narrates a previous event about Sheldon and how he was mistaken for a mother turtle's child. "Hansel and Garfield": When Nermal comes over for a visit, Garfield is forced to entertain him, and narrates the story of Hansel and Gretel. Nermal protests various elements of the story, and Garfield must change them to satisfy him.
17	4	"Sludge Monster"	September 23, 1989	204
17	4	"Fortune Kooky"	September 23, 1989	204
17	4	"Heatwave Holiday"	September 23, 1989	204
"Sludge Monster": Jon, Garfield, and Odie are forced to stay in an old and abandoned hotel after the car breaks down in front of it. Jon plays a prank on Garfield and Odie by telling them that a "sludge monster" lurks in the hotel. "Fortune Kooky": Wade becomes superstitious after reading his paper fortunes from Chinese fortune cookies. Roy makes a fake fortune and then stages its events to scare Wade, only for his own fortune to start coming true. "Heatwave Holiday": Garfield combats a hot July day by "thinking cool," leading him to set up Christmas decorations. Jon, Odie, and the entire town soon follow suit, prompting a summer holiday.
18	5	"One Good Fern Deserves Another"	September 30, 1989	205
18	5	"Goody-Go-Round"	September 30, 1989	205
18	5	"The Black Book"	September 30, 1989	205
"One Good Fern Deserves Another": After Garfield and Odie destroy all of Jon's ferns, he heads to a greenhouse to purchase a new one. The new fern tries to eat everyone in the house, and Garfield must get rid of it. "Goody-Go-Round": Bo wants a record player, and Orson sets out to find him one as a gift. A chain reaction is put in effect after the giver wants something in return. "The Black Book": Believing that his date is already going out with a different man, Jon swears off women and tells Garfield to hide his little black book of phone numbers. When he changes his mind, Garfield holds to his promise and refuses to reveal his hiding place.
19	6	"The Legend of the Lake"	September 30, 1989	206
19	6	"Double Oh Orson"	September 30, 1989	206
19	6	"Health Feud"	September 30, 1989	206
"The Legend of the Lake": Garfield, hosting a tour of the National Cat Museum, narrates a story about a prehistoric cat. The cat was determined to cross a giant lake to reach the fabled "lasagna trees" that grew on a faraway island. "Double Oh Orson": Orson reads a spy novel, and his imagination turns him into "Double-oh-Orson" in a parody of the James Bond film Thunderball. On his adventure, Double-oh-Orson combats the villainous "Pinfeather" (Roy) and tries to stop the top-secret highly-experimental thermonuclear exploding grelbin device before it is too late. "Health Feud": Garfield takes revenge on a stereotypical TV health/fitness show host when his influence on Jon becomes a threat to Garfield's lifestyle.
20	7	"Binky Gets Cancelled!"	October 7, 1989	207
20	7	"Show Stoppers"	October 7, 1989	207
20	7	"Cutie and the Beast"	October 7, 1989	207
"Binky Gets Cancelled!": When Binky the Clown's show is cancelled due to low ratings, he eventually gets a new job as a handyman. This coincides with Jon wanting repairs done around the home, which leads to Binky redecorating the whole house. "Show Stoppers": The farm animals put on a talent show, with Wade having stage fright. When Orson also gets it when his brothers attend the show, it is up to Wade to save the day. "Cutie and the Beast": Nermal runs away after one of Garfield's pranks. Odie is upset and nags Garfield into finding Nermal, which he eventually sets out to do.
21	8	"The Lasagna Zone"	October 7, 1989	208
21	8	"Sleepytime Pig"	October 7, 1989	208
21	8	"Yojumbo"	October 7, 1989	208
"The Lasagna Zone": When Jon buys a new TV satellite dish, he cautions Garfield about getting lasagna on its surface. After Garfield neglects to heed the warning, he is transported into various TV shows, leaving Odie to try to get him out. "Sleepytime Pig": Orson is tired, and his friends and the Sandman's substitute try to make Orson go to sleep. "Yojumbo": When Jon and Liz's date is interrupted by a thug, Jon resolves to take martial arts classes and become an "urban samurai" to build confidence. Garfield, knowing that his hapless owner will get into trouble, imagines himself as "Yojumbo," a samurai warrior, to protect him.
22	9	"Pros and Cons"	October 14, 1989	209
22	9	"Rooster Revenge"	October 14, 1989	209
22	9	"Lights! Camera! Garfield!"	October 14, 1989	209
"Pros and Cons": After being assigned to buy groceries, Odie is cheated out of his money by an alley cat, who trades an old sock for Odie's grocery money. Jon is angry and demands that Odie get the money back. "Rooster Revenge": After pulling several pranks on Orson, Roy fears that Orson will pull a revenge prank on him, despite Orson saying that he will not. "Lights! Camera! Garfield!": Garfield accepts a job as a movie stunt double.
23	10	"Polecat Flats"	October 14, 1989	210
23	10	"Hogcules"	October 14, 1989	210
23	10	"Brain Boy"	October 14, 1989	210
"Polecat Flats": Jon takes Garfield to a dude ranch called "Polecat Flats", where Garfield learns about ranch life while wondering what a polecat is (a skunk). After Garfield finally asks Cactus Jake what a polecat is and he receives his answer, he realizes all too late that he already encountered one. Cactus Jake makes his first appearance in this episode. "Hogcules": Orson tells Booker and Sheldon the myth of Hercules. Roy tells him his brothers are coming to visit and then Orson falls asleep, wondering what being Hercules would be like. Garfield is framed for destruction by the son of Jon's cousin.
24	11	"Maine Course"	October 21, 1989	211
24	11	"No Laughing Matter"	October 21, 1989	211
24	11	"Attack of the Mutant Guppies"	October 21, 1989	211
"Maine Course": A lady from a restaurant sends Jon a live lobster to cook. Jon, Garfield, and Odie eventually befriend it as a family member and name him Therm. When Therm gets sick, they must fly to Maine and let him back into the sea. "No Laughing Matter": After Roy annoys the farm animals with a new joke book, aliens who lack a sense of humor visit the farm to destroy the Earth's comedy. Since laughter is a weapon to them, the group turns to Roy and his endless bad jokes to defeat the aliens. "Attack of the Mutant Guppies": After hearing Garfield's story on giant radioactive mutant guppies, Nermal gets too scared to sleep. As an apology, Garfield tries to prove to Nermal that the story is fake.
25	12	"Robodie"	October 21, 1989	212
25	12	"First Aid Wade"	October 21, 1989	212
25	12	"Video Victim"	October 21, 1989	212
"Robodie": A mad scientist kidnaps Odie to use him as a model for his cloning machine that makes toy robots. "First Aid Wade": Wade injures his leg and thinks that Roy and Orson will perform surgery on it, despite the injury not being a serious one. "Video Victim": Garfield and Jon make a bet that if Garfield can stop watching TV for 24 hours, Jon will stop using the vacuum, which annoys Garfield. Garfield struggles to resist the temptation of watching television, especially when the TV itself apparently becomes sentient.
26	13	"The Curse of Klopman"	October 28, 1989	213
26	13	"Mud Sweet Mud"	October 28, 1989	213
26	13	"Rainy Day Dreams"	October 28, 1989	213
"The Curse of Klopman": Jon's third cousin Norbert has died and has left the Klopman Diamond to Garfield in his will. Norbert's business partner believes it should go to him and tries to get Garfield to sell him the diamond. "Mud Sweet Mud": Everyone chooses to clean up the farm. When the others want to remove Orson's waller, Orson explains what it means to him. "Rainy Day Dreams": Garfield and Odie use their imaginations to entertain themselves on a rainy day while Jon is on a date.
27	14	"Basket Brawl"	October 28, 1989	214
27	14	"Origin of Power Pig!"	October 28, 1989	214
27	14	"Cactus Jake Rides Again"	October 28, 1989	214
"Basket Brawl": Set as a basketball game that mice attend, Jon, Odie, and Nermal attempt to pack a picnic lunch without Garfield devouring the food. Guest voice: Chick Hearn as Chick Mouse. "Origin of Power Pig!" Orson tells Wade the story of how he invented Power Pig, while his brothers get an idea for stealing the harvest crops. "Cactus Jake Rides Again": Jon, Odie, and Garfield invite Cactus Jake to reside at their home temporarily during a rodeo championship, which they find unpleasant.
28	15	"Binky Goes Bad!"	November 4, 1989	215
28	15	"Barn of Fear"	November 4, 1989	215
28	15	"Mini-Mall Matters"	November 4, 1989	215
"Binky Goes Bad!": Stinky Davis, a criminal, disguises himself as Binky the Clown to commit crimes around town. When the real Binky is mistaken for Stinky and arrested, he must stand trial and prove his innocence. Garfield, who is appalled that the show is doing an "evil twin" episode, gets involved to save Binky. "Barn of Fear": A massive harvest prompts the gang to stay in the farm's old barn, which Wade insists is haunted by the ghosts of the group's ancestors. Orson tries to dissuade him, while his brothers decide to dress up as ghosts to scare the animals off and steal the crops. "Mini-Mall Matters": Garfield hosts an "educational" show about mini-malls. He shows how they are grown and maintained, as well as what can be found in them.
29	16	"Attention Getting Garfield"	November 11, 1989	216
29	16	"Swine Trek"	November 11, 1989	216
29	16	"It Must Be True!"	November 11, 1989	216
"Attention Getting Garfield": Garfield tries to win back public attention after he realizes that Odie gets more attention than he does. "Swine Trek": While resting due to a terrible cold, Orson dreams that he and the gang are part of a galaxy crew called Swine Trek (a parody of Star Trek). "It Must Be True!": Garfield presents a TV show to a live audience called It Must Be True! where he claims everything stated on television is a true fact.
30	17	"Arrivaderci, Odie!"	November 18, 1989	217
30	17	"Gort Goes Good"	November 18, 1989	217
30	17	"Feeling Feline"	November 18, 1989	217
"Arrivaderci, Odie!": Garfield believes that Jon has gotten rid of Odie, who is staying overnight at the vet. Garfield then gets worried and finds himself unable to get Odie off of his mind. "Gort Goes Good": One of Orson's brothers, Gort, says that he has given up his evil ways and is now on Orson's side. The farm animals agree to Gort's help, although Wade is suspicious. "Feeling Feline": After hearing a claim on television about pet owners becoming like their pets, Jon and Garfield both dismiss the idea. Jon finds himself acting suspiciously like Garfield later that night. This leads to a dream in which Jon slowly transforms into a human version of Garfield, constantly asking for lasagna and sleeping all day.
31	18	"The Bear Facts"	November 18, 1989	218
31	18	"Nothing to Be Afraid Of"	November 18, 1989	218
31	18	"The Big Talker"	November 18, 1989	218
"The Bear Facts": While Jon, Garfield, and Odie camp in the forest (much to Garfield's dismay), a stray dancing bear from the circus shows up. "Nothing to Be Afraid Of": The farm animals are tired of Wade's phobias, so they try to find something that does not scare him. "The Big Talker": Garfield is furious with Joe Palaver (a parody of Morton Downey Jr.), a loudmouth television host, who hates cats and says they are not useful whatsoever. After finding out that Palaver is superstitious, Garfield carries out revenge with signs of bad luck. Guest voice: Stanley Ralph Ross as Joe Palaver
32	19	"Cactus Makes Perfect"	November 25, 1989	219
32	19	"Hogcules II"	November 25, 1989	219
32	19	"Crime and Nourishment"	November 25, 1989	219
"Cactus Makes Perfect": Garfield, Jon, and Odie visit Cactus Jake on his ranch. Cactus Jake shares a story about a cat he encountered, which was similar to Garfield. "Hogcules II": Roy tricks Wade into spilling grain from a silo, and Orson ends up trying to clean it up. He later daydreams about Hogcules dealing with a two-headed giant that stole a large birdbath. "Crime and Nourishment": When a picnic basket gets stolen, Garfield goes after it. He stumbles upon a strange community of small green people, who use food items as currency and eat money.
33	20	"T.V. of Tomorrow"	November 25, 1989	220
33	20	"Little Red Riding Egg"	November 25, 1989	220
33	20	"Well Fed Feline"	November 25, 1989	220
"T.V. of Tomorrow": After their current television set breaks, Jon, Garfield, and Odie go shopping for a new TV. Guest voice: Frank Buxton. "Little Red Riding Egg": After finding a video camera, Orson plans to make a movie with the farm animals adapting Little Red Riding Hood, using Sheldon as the title character. "Well Fed Feline": When an activist sees Jon outraged at Garfield for eating his lasagna cake (and hearing him say that he will never feed Garfield again), she threatens to call the police unless Jon feeds Garfield as much as he can. This works too well as Jon forgets to feed Nermal and she follows through with her threat. It is up to Garfield to put an end to this misunderstanding.
34	21	"Invasion of the Big Robots"	December 2, 1989	221
34	21	"Shelf Esteem"	December 2, 1989	221
34	21	"Housebreak Hotel"	December 2, 1989	221
"Invasion of the Big Robots": Garfield wakes up in the wrong cartoon, and must return to Garfield and Friends. "Shelf Esteem": After Wade crashes into his library, Orson plans to put all of his books away. Since he cannot resist reading whatever he picks up, Lanolin and Roy make a bet to see if Orson will finish the job. "Housebreak Hotel": Jon is going out of town and brings Garfield and Odie to a pet hotel. Garfield is impressed with the hotel until he discovers that the animals are kept in cages and neglected. Guest voice: Jesse White as Howie
35	22	"First Class Feline"	December 2, 1989	222
35	22	"Hamelot"	December 2, 1989	222
35	22	"How to Be Funny!"	December 2, 1989	222
"First Class Feline": After a prank by Garfield, Jon, Odie, and Nermal team up to trick him into thinking that he really sent Nermal to Abu Dhabi. "Hamelot": Orson loses consciousness after falling off a stack of objects, leading to him dreaming of a Camelot-like setting. "How to Be Funny!": Garfield gives a lecture on humor and what it means to be funny. He goes into detail on what is funny and what is not funny.
36	23	"Mystic Manor"	December 9, 1989	223
36	23	"Flop Goes the Weasel"	December 9, 1989	223
36	23	"The Legend of Long Jon"	December 9, 1989	223
"Mystic Manor": When Odie wanders into an old mansion, Garfield goes to get him back to avoid getting in trouble. "Flop Goes the Weasel": A weasel is on the farm, lurking around to steal chickens. The farm animals believe Wade is a hero after inadvertently defeating the Weasel. "The Legend of Long Jon": While visiting Yorktown, Jon discovers that he had an ancestor named Long Jon Arbuckle, who was apparently a traitorous pirate during the American Revolutionary War. Garfield and Odie read Long Jon Arbuckle's diary to find out more about him. Odie later discovers that some apparently blank pages of his diary were actually written in invisible ink, which reveals a secret that remained hidden for over 200 years. Guest voice: Shep Menken
37	24	"China Cat"	December 9, 1989	224
37	24	"Cock-a-Doodle Dandy"	December 9, 1989	224
37	24	"Beach Blanket Bonzo"	December 9, 1989	224
"China Cat": While visiting China, a waitress at a restaurant tells Jon a legend about an orange cat similar to Garfield, and how it brings bad luck. "Cock-a-Doodle Dandy": Bo tells the viewers about Roy, who is being attacked by a sleepy bear when trying to make his bugle wake-up call on time. "Beach Blanket Bonzo": Jon tries to impress a girl at the beach. Garfield does not understand how anyone could go crazy over a pretty face until he falls in love with a female cat named Lola, whose strong boyfriend does not like Garfield.
38	25	"Lemon Aid"	December 16, 1989	226
38	25	"Hog Noon"	December 16, 1989	226
38	25	"Video Airlines"	December 16, 1989	226
"Lemon Aid": Jon gets conned by Al Swindler into getting a new car, only to find that it is broken. Swindler then tries to sell Jon his old car back. "Hog Noon": Hammerhead Hog, the pig that bullied Orson back in school, writes Orson a letter reading that he is coming to settle a score with him once and for all. Orson prepares for the visit. Once Hammerhead arrives, he pays Orson back the lunch money he stole and apologizes. "Video Airlines": When Garfield, Jon and Odie want to watch a movie, "Kung Fu Creatures on the Rampage II" constantly appears. Their attempts to find another film to watch are constantly hindered by the seemingly-inescapable movie.
39	26	"The Mail Animal"	December 16, 1989	225
39	26	"Peanut-Brained Rooster"	December 16, 1989	225
39	26	"Mummy Dearest"	December 16, 1989	225
"The Mail Animal": After a prank by Garfield, Herman Post gets fired by the post office chief for being a disgrace and afraid of a cat. To get Herman back his job, Garfield harasses the post office chief. "Peanut-Brained Rooster": Orson tells the story of how Roy became obsessed with peanuts. "Mummy Dearest": While unconscious after an accident during a museum visit, Garfield dreams that he is a cat in ancient Egypt, where someone is trying to get rid of him, as he is the good luck charm of the Pharaoh (Jon).

=== Season 3 (1990) ===
No. overall	No. in season	Title	Original release date	Prod. code
40	1	"Skyway Robbery"	September 15, 1990	301
40	1	"The Bunny Rabbits is Coming!"	September 15, 1990	301
40	1	"Close Encounters of the Garfield Kind"	September 15, 1990	301
"Skyway Robbery": Jon wants to go to Miami, only to find that all of the airlines are too expensive. Al Swindler then manages to con him with a cheap flight on a broken airplane. "The Bunny Rabbits is Coming!": Orson receives a message that simply reads, "The Bunny Rabbits is Coming!" Wade becomes terrified, while others make note of the message's grammar error. "Close Encounters of the Garfield Kind": An alien crash lands near Garfield's home. Jon, who thinks the alien is cute, lets him stay at his house.
41	2	"Astrocat"	September 15, 1990	302
41	2	"Cock-A-Doodle Duel"	September 15, 1990	302
41	2	"Cinderella Cat"	September 15, 1990	302
"Astrocat": Garfield tells Odie the story of his great-uncle Buchanan, the first cat in space. "Cock-A-Doodle Duel": A rooster named Plato moves to the farm and all of the chickens are now in love with Plato, leaving Roy heartbroken. Because of this, Roy moves away. Orson is sure that Plato will do a fine job until the weasel manages to steal the chickens. "Cinderella Cat": After discovering a lost copy of Cinderella in the park, Garfield encounters a Fairy Godfather. The "Fairy Godfather" steals things that Garfield wishes for so that he can give them to Garfield.
42	3	"Ship Shape"	September 22, 1990	303
42	3	"Barn of Fear II"	September 22, 1990	303
42	3	"Break-a-Leg"	September 22, 1990	303
"Ship Shape": Jon goes on a cruise, and Garfield manages to sneak on board. The captain finds out, so Garfield comes up with strategies to distance himself from the captain. "Barn of Fear II": Following the events of the original "Barn of Fear", Orson plans to throw a harvest party in the old barn. Wade fears the barn could still be haunted. Meanwhile, Orson's brothers plot to steal the crops. "Break-a-Leg": Garfield and Jon go to a ski resort. Despite Garfield warning Jon that he could get hurt, Jon convinces a girl that he is a great skier, forcing him to prove himself.
43	4	"Twice Told Tale"	September 22, 1990	304
43	4	"Orson Goes On Vacation"	September 22, 1990	304
43	4	"Wedding Bell Blues"	September 22, 1990	304
"Twice Told Tale": After an accident that results in the house being filled with yogurt, Garfield and Jon each tell their point of view about how it happened. Each one exaggerates and accuses the other of causing the accident. "Orson Goes On Vacation": When Orson goes on vacation, he leaves Wade in charge. Wade, who is uncertain if he can accomplish the task, encounters Booker chasing the worm, arguments, Orson's brothers and the weasel. "Wedding Bell Blues": When Jon's cousin Marian visits and tells him about her upcoming wedding, Garfield and Odie overhear part of their conversation. Garfield gets confused and thinks that Marian is marrying Jon, so he does everything to stop the wedding.
44	5	"Clean Sweep"	September 29, 1990	305
44	5	"Secrets of the Animated Cartoon"	September 29, 1990	305
44	5	"How the West was Lost"	September 29, 1990	305
"Clean Sweep": After getting fed up with Odie's resistance to taking baths, Jon buys a machine that bathes Odie faster and forcefully. Garfield takes advantage of the machine to have fun at Odie's expense. "Secrets of the Animated Cartoon": Orson explains cartoon physics to the viewers and Wade. The topics include falling, takes (i.e. reactions) and chase scenes. "How the West was Lost": After Cactus Jake is fired from the ranch, Jon tries to find him a new job. Jake's cowboy nature gets in the way of each job.
45	6	"Binky Gets Cancelled Again!"	September 29, 1990	306
45	6	"Orson's Diner"	September 29, 1990	306
45	6	"Flat Tired"	September 29, 1990	306
"Binky Gets Cancelled Again!": Due to the lack of educational material in Binky's show, the WBOR manager replaces Binky the Clown with the Buddy Bears. Garfield, not liking the change, plots to get Binky back on the station. "Orson's Diner": Whilst putting books away, Orson is inspired to make his own restaurant to make money for himself and Wade. Roy attempts to get free food when Orson makes an offer that if they cannot fulfill an order, the customer will get meals free for a month. "Flat Tired": Garfield is too tired to do a cartoon, so Odie fills in for him and Garfield watches. In the cartoon, Odie goes to the house of an old lady, who turns out to be a witch. When the witch puts Odie into a predicament, Garfield is eventually compelled to help.
46	7	"Return of the Buddy Bears"	October 6, 1990	307
46	7	"Much Ado About Lanolin"	October 6, 1990	307
46	7	"Reigning Cats and Dogs"	October 6, 1990	307
"Return of the Buddy Bears": Garfield wrecks the house, and Jon tells him to clean it up or he gets no food. He does not seem to have an easy solution until the Buddy Bears show up. "Much Ado About Lanolin": Orson puts on an imaginary play called The Taming of the Shrew with an imaginary Lanolin as the shrew. "Reigning Cats and Dogs": Garfield hosts a show on why cats are better than dogs.
47	8	"Fit for a King"	October 6, 1990	308
47	8	"Ben Hog"	October 6, 1990	308
47	8	"Dessert in the Desert"	October 6, 1990	308
"Fit for a King": Garfield tells a story about Jon the Wide, a king who earns his weight in gold. A jealous duke tries to ruin his life by giving him a fat cat as the king's taster, eventually causing the king to lose weight. "Ben Hog": While everyone else is off at the State Fair parade, Orson is guarding the harvest and his brothers distract him with a copy of Ben-Hur. "Dessert in the Desert": After Jon gets a flat tire, Garfield and Odie get lost in the desert and begin to hallucinate.
48	9	"Hound of the Arbuckles"	October 13, 1990	309
48	9	"Read Alert"	October 13, 1990	309
48	9	"Urban Arbuckle"	October 13, 1990	309
"Hound of the Arbuckles": When Garfield is unable to watch The Hound of the Baskervilles, he dozes off and finds himself playing Watson in a dream sequence entitled The Hound of the Arbuckles. "Read Alert": As Orson reads books, his imagination overflows into the world outside his mind and interferes with Roy and Wade. "Urban Arbuckle": Cactus Jake fixes up Jon with his daughter, Cactus Jackie. While on a dinner date (with Garfield and Cactus Jackie's entire family), Jon struggles to ride a mechanical bull in an attempt to impress Jackie.
49	10	"Odielocks and the Three Cats"	October 13, 1990	310
49	10	"Quack to the Future"	October 13, 1990	310
49	10	"Beddy Buy"	October 13, 1990	310
"Odielocks and the Three Cats": While waiting for his microwave lasagna to cool, Garfield tells Odie his version of Goldilocks and the Three Bears by changing it to Odielocks and the Three Cats. "Quack to the Future": Orson yells at Wade for getting oil spilled on him. Orson soon feels bad about what he did, then dreams about having a time machine to see what may be in the future. "Beddy Buy": After Garfield breaks his bed, he and Jon go out to buy a new one.
50	11	"Count Lasagna"	October 20, 1990	311
50	11	"Mystery Guest"	October 20, 1990	311
50	11	"Rodent Rampage"	October 20, 1990	311
"Count Lasagna": Jon attempts to pitch a comic book featuring Dracula's cat, "Count Lasagna". "Mystery Guest": Roy hosts a game show called "Mystery Guest" with a tractor as a prize and Garfield as the mystery guest. Orson's brothers show up to try and steal the tractor. "Rodent Rampage": Floyd's cousin Tyrone visits and is surprised upon discovering Garfield does not chase mice. Once Jon discovers the mice in his house, he tries to get Garfield to chase them away. Guest voice: Jack Riley as Tyrone.
51	12	"The Feline Felon"	October 20, 1990	312
51	12	"The Legal Eagle"	October 20, 1990	312
51	12	"The Cactus Saga"	October 20, 1990	312
"The Feline Felon": Jon bakes a pie for a charity bake sale and warns Garfield not to steal the pie, which Garfield does anyway. While falling down a tree with the pie, Garfield fantasizes about being on a TV show called Wanted: Bad Guys. Guest voice: Bill Woodson as the Wanted: Bad Guys narrator. "The Legal Eagle": When Orson finds a book of farm laws, he elects to have someone make sure that these laws are kept. Orson asks Roy to help out, which soon gets out of hand. "The Cactus Saga": Cactus Jake tells Jon and Garfield the story of how he got to be known as Cactus Jake. The flashback sequence features Cactus Jake's Grandpa Jack and his sidekick (resembling Garfield) The Lasagna Kid.
52	13	"D.J. Jon"	October 27, 1990	313
52	13	"Cornfinger"	October 27, 1990	313
52	13	"Five Minute Warning"	October 27, 1990	313
"D.J. Jon": When Jon visits his cousin George, he accepts a job as a disc jockey at a local radio station. The job soon takes over his life, leading him to neglect Garfield and Odie. "Cornfinger": Orson imagines himself as Double Oh Orson to find the location of the missing corn. "Five Minute Warning": Jon makes a wager to Garfield that if he can stop eating for 5 minutes to prove Garfield's self-control, he will give him chocolate cake and do a can-can dance. This becomes more challenging for Garfield than he anticipated.
53	14	"Wonderful World"	October 27, 1990	314
53	14	"The Orson Awards"	October 27, 1990	314
53	14	"The Garfield Workout"	October 27, 1990	314
"Wonderful World": Jon takes Garfield and Odie to an amusement park after watching a commercial for it, only to find out that it has been neglected for years and taken over by Al Swindler. "The Orson Awards": The 32nd annual Orson awards ceremony is being held, and Orson runs into his brothers, who demand an award. Meanwhile, Roy is determined to win an award. "The Garfield Workout": Garfield hosts his own exercise program.
54	15	"All Things Fat and Small"	November 3, 1990	315
54	15	"Robin Hog"	November 3, 1990	315
54	15	"Hare Replacement"	November 3, 1990	315
"All Things Fat and Small": While on a camping trip, Garfield accidentally falls into a runaway raft and ends up on another part of the campgrounds. He later encounters a bear and raccoon that have been stealing picnic lunches. "Robin Hog": After a walnut falls on his head, Orson fantasizes about becoming Robin Hog; while dreaming, he figures out a way to take back the supply of walnuts that Roy had stolen. "Hare Replacement": Jon is performing a magic act, complete with a rabbit. The rabbit is getting tired of being part of magic acts and runs away, leaving Jon to put Garfield in a rabbit suit as a replacement.
55	16	"Stick to It"	November 10, 1990	316
55	16	"Orson in Wonderland"	November 10, 1990	316
55	16	"For Cats Only"	November 10, 1990	316
"Stick to It": Annoyed with Odie wanting to persistently fetch a stick, Garfield throws the stick as hard as he can so that Odie will not bring it back. Odie chases the stick to virtually every place a dog can go. "Orson in Wonderland": While playing croquet with Lanolin, Orson's croquet ball goes clear into the woods. After he reaches his ball, he drifts off and dreams of himself in an Alice in Wonderland setting. "For Cats Only": Garfield shows how cats came to Earth from another planet and are pretending to be pets for humans in order to enslave them.
56	17	"Mistakes Will Happen"	November 17, 1990	317
56	17	"The Well Dweller"	November 17, 1990	317
56	17	"The Wise Man"	November 17, 1990	317
"Mistakes Will Happen": In response to letters about mistakes on the show, Garfield tries to convince viewers that his show does not have any mistakes. He and Odie watch a cartoon that is full of mistakes. "The Well Dweller": While drilling for water, Orson encounters a strange little creature named Al. "The Wise Man": Jon takes in a Maharishi to give him peace and tranquility. The Maharishi's idea of peace and tranquility does not sit well with Garfield.
57	18	"Star Struck"	November 17, 1990	318
57	18	"Election Daze"	November 17, 1990	318
57	18	"Dirty Business"	November 17, 1990	318
"Star Struck": Fed up with being underrepresented in the show, Garfield tries to write his own episode. The scenarios for each end with Garfield eating and sleeping. "Election Daze": The weasel tricks Roy into challenging Orson for barn leadership and rigs the voting booth in his latest attempt to steal the chickens. "Dirty Business": Jon takes Garfield and Odie to visit his cousin Berferd. They soon find out that things tend to disappear in Berferd's store.

=== Season 4 (1991) ===
No. overall	No. in season	Title	Original release date	Prod. code
58	1	"Moo Cow Mutt"	September 14, 1991	403
58	1	"Big Bad Buddy Bird"	September 14, 1991	403
58	1	"Angel Puss"	September 14, 1991	403
"Moo Cow Mutt": Odie is tricked by Garfield into believing he is a cow. When Jon finds out about the trick, he pretends that Odie really is a cow that looks like a dog. "Big Bad Buddy Bird": Roy leaves the farm (with Wade taking his place) and becomes a cast member on The Buddy Bears Show. He plays Big Bad Buddy Bird, who always disagrees with the gang. After being continually crushed by safes and realizing that bandwagoning is wrong, Roy wants his old job back. "Angel Puss": An angel is assigned to help Odie and Garfield get along. Guest voice: Marvin Kaplan as Angel Puss
59	2	"Trial and Error"	September 14, 1991	404
59	2	"An Egg-Citing Story"	September 14, 1991	404
59	2	"Supermarket Mania"	September 14, 1991	404
"Trial and Error": When two mice steal Garfield's blueberry pie, Garfield accuses Odie of stealing it. Odie wants to have a trial. "An Egg-Citing Story": Orson narrates the origin of Sheldon following numerous mail requests asking "what's the deal with the egg". "Supermarket Mania": When a large supermarket called "Food Monster" opens across the street, all of the customers of Gramps' general store are taken. The owner of Food Monster convinces Jon, the best customer at Gramps', to shop at his store. However, none of the customers at Food Monster are aware of the store's true nature. Guest voice: Paul Winchell as Gramps and Mr. Baggett.
60	3	"The Legend of Cactus Jupiter"	September 21, 1991	401
60	3	"Birthday Boy Roy"	September 21, 1991	401
60	3	"Jukebox Jon"	September 21, 1991	401
"The Legend of Cactus Jupiter": Cactus Jake tells the story of how one can see into the future by looking into a fire. Garfield sees himself and his friends as space-cowboys in the far future. "Birthday Boy Roy": It is Roy's birthday, and everybody on the farm gives him a pocket watch. The watch goes missing, among other things around the farm. "Jukebox Jon": Jon wants to work for a man who dislikes people who bite their nails. He buys a record to help him break his habit in his sleep, which gets mixed up among Garfield's and Odie's other records.
61	4	"Squeak Previews"	September 21, 1991	402
61	4	"Dr. Jekyll and Mr. Wade"	September 21, 1991	402
61	4	"A Tall Tale"	September 21, 1991	402
"Squeak Previews": Two mouse movie critics review a movie about mice attempting to steal food. "Dr. Jekyll and Mr. Wade": Wade hypnotizes himself into turning into a monster when he hears a bell and back again when he hears it again. "A Tall Tale": Nermal tells his version of Paul Bunyan stories by the director's request. Garfield is unimpressed.
62	5	"Frankenstein Feline"	September 28, 1991	405
62	5	"Weatherman Wade"	September 28, 1991	405
62	5	"Fill-in Feline"	September 28, 1991	405
"Frankenstein Feline": Jon dreams about a Frankenstein monster cat with the stomach of a whale that eats so much the town chases him and his creator out of town. "Weatherman Wade": Orson and the others are tired of the rain. Wade supposedly stops it with a wish. This becomes a problem later on, as the farm runs out of water. "Fill-in Feline": Nermal replaces Garfield when the latter becomes sick.
63	6	"Polar Pussycat"	September 28, 1991	406
63	6	"Over the Rainbow"	September 28, 1991	406
63	6	"Remote Possibilities"	September 28, 1991	406
"Polar Pussycat": Garfield gets lost at the South Pole when he accidentally gets sent on a plane while taking a nap. "Over the Rainbow": Roy looks for a pot of gold at the end of the rainbow and winds up participating on a Let's Make a Deal-style game show. Guest voice: Rod Roddy as Johnny. "Remote Possibilities": Garfield thinks a scientist's experimental remote is the one Jon ordered.
64	7	"Night of the Living Laundromat"	October 5, 1991	407
64	7	"Fast Food"	October 5, 1991	407
64	7	"Cash and Carry"	October 5, 1991	407
"Night of the Living Laundromat": In the first episode of "Garfield's Tales of Scary Stuff", Jon acquires a washing machine containing a creature that eats clothes. "Fast Food": Orson, Wade, Booker, and Roy complain that Bo is a slow cook, so Roy creates a fast food restaurant called Roy's Rapid Restaurant. Orson, Wade, and Booker find it too "fast" for them as they still can't get any food. With Garfield's help, Orson, Booker and Wade shut down Roy's restaurant, but are now back with Bo's slow cooking. "Cash and Carry": After receiving an expensive credit card bill, Jon cuts up his credit cards and buys everything with cash. It becomes a hassle later on when Jon tries to buy a new wastebasket.
65	8	"Speed Trap"	October 5, 1991	408
65	8	"Flights of Fantasy"	October 5, 1991	408
65	8	"Castaway Cat"	October 5, 1991	408
"Speed Trap": Jon is given a speeding ticket by a shady police officer after speeding in an 8 MPH zone. He gets held up when he refuses to pay the ticket. "Flights of Fantasy": Orson convinces Wade to use his imagination and Wade imagines that he is saving the chickens from the weasel — unaware that his imagination is real. Meanwhile, trouble goes on when Roy accidentally kisses a bear. "Castaway Cat": When the cable goes out, Garfield is forced to turn to books for entertainment. Eventually, Garfield becomes so engrossed in the story of Robinson Crusoe that he starts acting out the novel, incorporating Odie, Jon, and the guy who comes to fix the cable.
66	9	"Mind over Matter"	October 12, 1991	409
66	9	"Orson at the Bat"	October 12, 1991	409
66	9	"The Multiple Choice Cartoon"	October 12, 1991	409
"Mind over Matter": Jon takes Garfield and Odie to see Swami Pastrami, and they run into a woman who swipes Jon's wallet and thus feeds Jon's info to the Swami. The Swami later returns Jon his wallet and also gives Jon a medallion that can supposedly read minds. "Orson at the Bat": While playing baseball, Orson gets hit on the head with a ball and daydreams about being the title character in "Casey at the Bat". "The Multiple Choice Cartoon": Garfield gives the audience a unique episode where they can make choices on what happens in the cartoon.
67	10	"Galactic Gamesman Garfield"	October 12, 1991	410
67	10	"Sly Spy Guy"	October 12, 1991	410
67	10	"The Thing That Stayed Forever"	October 12, 1991	410
"Galactic Gamesman Garfield": Garfield gets hooked on video games while Jon has appendicitis. "Sly Spy Guy": When Orson is unable to find his spy novel, he imagines that he is Double Oh Orson instead. "The Thing That Stayed Forever": Jon's uncle Ed is visiting his house for a while, until Garfield, Jon, and Odie get so fed up with him that they find a way to get rid of him.
68	11	"Bouncing Baby Blues"	October 19, 1991	411
68	11	"The Ugly Duckling"	October 19, 1991	411
68	11	"Learning Lessons"	October 19, 1991	411
"Bouncing Baby Blues": Garfield and Odie go to the supermarket and accidentally take a baby home. "The Ugly Duckling": Orson tells the story of "The Ugly Duckling", who is Wade with a paper bag over his head, combined with elements of The Wizard of Oz. "Learning Lessons": The network wants the show to be more educational, so the Buddy Bears are instructed to give educational lessons to anything Garfield mentions.
69	12	"Robodie II"	October 19, 1991	412
69	12	"For Butter or Worse"	October 19, 1991	412
69	12	"Annoying Things"	October 19, 1991	412
"Robodie II": Dr. Garbanzo Bean once again makes robotic clones of Odie, with a giant robot dog being accidentally made as well. "For Butter or Worse": Convinced that Roy stole all the butter on the farm, Orson imagines that he is Power Pig in an effort to prove it. "Annoying Things": Garfield hosts a television show about what annoys him, and is forced to leave out listing dogs due to threats.
70	13	"Guaranteed Trouble"	October 26, 1991	413
70	13	"Fan Clubbing"	October 26, 1991	413
70	13	"A Jarring Experience"	October 26, 1991	413
"Guaranteed Trouble": Garfield, Odie, and Jon buy a new TV off of Madman Murray. "Fan Clubbing": Roy and Wade fight over who should have the barn for their fan club. "A Jarring Experience": A teenage mouse mistakes that Garfield is responsible for his missing mother, no matter how many times Garfield insists that he is innocent. He then sends in an Arnold Schwarzenegger-like mouse to make Garfield admit where his mother is.
71	14	"The Idol of Id"	November 2, 1991	414
71	14	"Bedtime Story Blues"	November 2, 1991	414
71	14	"Mamma Manicotti"	November 2, 1991	414
"The Idol of Id": While touring a museum, Garfield and Odie accidentally touch an idol that exchanges their minds. "Bedtime Story Blues": Orson reads Cinderella to Booker and Sheldon, who keep making changes to the story, much to Orson's dismay. "Mamma Manicotti": Garfield, Odie, and Jon help make Mamma Manicotti famous by proving that one cannot duplicate recipes cooked with love.
72	15	"The Pizza Patrol"	November 9, 1991	415
72	15	"The Son Also Rises"	November 9, 1991	415
72	15	"Rolling Romance"	November 9, 1991	415
"The Pizza Patrol": After watching a commercial about a pizza delivering service with a "deliver-in-30-minutes-or-else-it's-free" guarantee, Garfield takes advantage of the offer. "The Son Also Rises": When his dad visits the farm, Wade tries to prove to him that he is no longer a coward. "Rolling Romance": Jon buys a used car from Madman Murray which comes with a computerized female voice and is attracted to Jon.
73	16	"The Automated, Animated Adventure"	November 9, 1991	416
73	16	"It's a Wonderful Wade"	November 9, 1991	416
73	16	"Truckin' Odie"	November 9, 1991	416
"The Automated, Animated Adventure": Animator Mr. Sprocket uses Garfield to demonstrate computer animation to Jon. Guest voice: Brian Cummings as Mr. Sprocket. "It's a Wonderful Wade": When Orson's brothers steal the vegetables that Wade was meant to guard, Wade is given trouble by the gang, compelling him to leave. Later, a guardian angel shows Wade what the farm would be like if he was never born. "Truckin' Odie": Garfield sings about Odie riding with a rookie trucker named Billy Bob.

=== Season 5 (1992) ===
No. overall	No. in season	Title	Original release date	Prod. code
74	1	"Home Away from Home"	September 19, 1992	501
74	1	"Rainy Day Robot"	September 19, 1992	501
74	1	"Odie the Amazing"	September 19, 1992	501
"Home Away from Home": Garfield runs away, and is nearly smothered by his new owner, who believes Garfield is her missing cat. "Rainy Day Robot": When Roy has to find water, he buys a robot that can alter any weather. Meanwhile, Orson's brothers try to steal the crop, disguised as a car. "Odie the Amazing": Odie finds a magic wand tossed away by a magician. Garfield and Odie think that it is merely another stick.
75	2	"The First Annual Garfield Watchers Test"	September 19, 1992	502
75	2	"Stark Raven Mad"	September 19, 1992	502
75	2	"The Record Breaker"	September 19, 1992	502
"The First Annual Garfield Watchers Test": Garfield hosts a quiz show while a spokesmouse continually advertises products. Guest voice: Dick Tufeld as Mouse Announcer. "Stark Raven Mad!: Orson tells his version of Edgar Allan Poe's The Raven, entitled The Rooster, which is about the main character (played by Orson) trying to guard his vegetables from the rooster (played by Roy). Meanwhile, Orson's brothers arrive to steal the crops. "The Record Breaker": When Garfield and Odie accidentally break his record player, Jon tries to find a new one.
76	3	"Renewed Terror"	September 26, 1992	503
76	3	"Badtime Story"	September 26, 1992	503
76	3	"Tooth or Dare"	September 26, 1992	503
"Renewed Terror": In the second episode of "Garfield's Tales of Scary Stuff", Jon is constantly pestered by a magazine salesman. "Badtime Story": Orson, too sick to read Chicken Licken to Booker and Sheldon, has the rest of the farm try to help. "Tooth or Dare": A saber-tooth tiger—one that should have been extinct millions of years ago—trades places with an unwittingly involved Garfield.
77	4	"Country Cousin"	September 26, 1992	504
77	4	"The Name Game"	September 26, 1992	504
77	4	"The Carnival Curse"	September 26, 1992	504
"Country Cousin": In an effort to get married, Jon's cousin Roscoe looks for a job. Roscoe is hired to re-shingle the roof, mow the lawn, and vacuum the house, all of which result in the house being wrecked. "The Name Game": In a similar episode to "Bedtime Story Blues", Orson reads Rumpelstiltskin to Booker and Sheldon, who (along with Wade and Roy) keep making changes to the story (e.g. showing a miller's son instead of a daughter and making the title character a superhero). "The Carnival Curse": After getting her arrested, Garfield is cursed by a fortune teller, which leads to him turning into a werewolf during a full moon.
78	5	"Home Sweet Swindler"	October 3, 1992	505
78	5	"Forget-Me-Not Newton"	October 3, 1992	505
78	5	"The Great Inventor"	October 3, 1992	505
"Home Sweet Swindler": Heavy rain causes Jon's roof to leak. After a series of scams by Swindler, Jon finally sells his house to him. "Forget-Me-Not Newton": Wade's dangerously forgetful cousin Newton comes to the farm looking for work. Meanwhile, Roy tries to build a rocket, and Gort tries to steal the tomato crop. "The Great Inventor": Garfield tells the story of a cat in Ancient Rome who helped create lasagna.
79	6	"Taste Makes Waist"	October 3, 1992	506
79	6	"The Wolf Who Cried Boy"	October 3, 1992	506
79	6	"Day of Doom"	October 3, 1992	506
"Taste Makes Waist": Jon buys a health food meal from an infomercial after going on a diet, only to discover that it is a scam. Garfield tries to get back at the advertiser. "The Wolf Who Cried Boy": Due to a wolf lurking around the farm, Orson informs everyone of a bell system to alert others of wolf sightings. It inspires Roy to perform a practical joke similar to The Boy Who Cried Wolf. They fall for the prank immediately twice in a row. The third time Roy rings the bell, they do not believe him at first but after a few minutes decide to investigate and find he was telling the truth, managing to catch the wolf in time. Orson explains why crying wolf is a bad idea with a role reversal fable where wolves are fearful of a boy with a gun hunting them. "Day of Doom": Garfield finds a wishing well and wishes to eliminate Mondays. He soon regrets his wish after learning that Monday is the day the garbage is collected, Jon mows the lawn, and Jon gets paid, among others. Guest voice: Charles Aidman as the narrator.
80	7	"The Kitty Council"	October 10, 1992	507
80	7	"The Bo Show"	October 10, 1992	507
80	7	"Bad Neighbor Policy"	October 10, 1992	507
"The Kitty Council": Garfield is put on trial by the Kitty Council for not meeting their expectations. "The Bo Show": After the farm animals, except Bo, are kidnapped by Orson's brothers, Bo has to perform the rest of the episode himself by impersonating everyone. "Bad Neighbor Policy": Garfield's neighbor goes into court to complain about Garfield's constant antics and ends up going mad after seeing Garfield's face everywhere.
81	8	"Canvas Back Cat"	October 10, 1992	508
81	8	"Make Believe Moon"	October 10, 1992	508
81	8	"The Creature that Lived in the Refrigerator, Behind the Mayonnaise, Next to the Ketchup and to the Left of the Coleslaw"	October 10, 1992	508
"Canvas Back Cat": A wrestler challenges Jon to a wrestling match by making an excuse that Garfield eats his pizzas. It is up to Garfield to save Jon from the wrestler. "Make Believe Moon": Orson imagines himself, Wade, and Roy taking a trip to the moon. Meanwhile, two weasels named Waylon and Spence attempt to steal the chickens. "The Creature that Lived in the Refrigerator, Behind the Mayonnaise, Next to the Ketchup and to the Left of the Coleslaw": In the third episode of "Garfield's Tales of Scary Stuff", Jon makes a new recipe that is so bad, it mutates into an unearthly creature after sitting in the refrigerator for months.
82	9	"Airborne Odie"	October 17, 1992	509
82	9	"Once Upon a Time Warp"	October 17, 1992	509
82	9	"Bride and Broom"	October 17, 1992	509
"Airborne Odie": Odie finds a magic lamp inside a small cave at the beach and wishes to be able to fly. Guest voice: Buddy Hackett as the Genie. "Once Upon a Time Warp": Wade tries to get his five dollars back from Roy. Orson gets fed up and tries to inspire Wade with historical moments. "Bride and Broom": A witch wants to make Jon her husband when her boyfriend ditches her. Garfield and Odie must find the witch's boyfriend before the marriage.
83	10	"Cute for Loot"	October 17, 1992	510
83	10	"The Caverns of Cocoa"	October 17, 1992	510
83	10	"Dream Date"	October 17, 1992	510
"Cute for Loot": Garfield uses Nermal's cuteness to his advantage in an attempt to get food. "The Caverns of Cocoa": Wade, Roy, and Orson discover a mine infested with chocolate—and then find out why it was abandoned. Orson's brothers show up and hope to eat the cocoa for themselves. "Dream Date": Jon goes on a rigged dating show. Garfield tries to ruin the date without telling him the truth so that he is not as hurt. Guest voice: Dick Gautier as Skip Yenta.
84	11	"The Worst Pizza in the History of Mankind"	October 24, 1992	511
84	11	"Jack II: The Rest of the Story"	October 24, 1992	511
84	11	"The Garfield Opera"	October 24, 1992	511
"The Worst Pizza in the History of Mankind": Garfield tells the story of a terrible pizza-maker who angers all of the townspeople with his bad pizza. "Jack II: The Rest of the Story": Upset with all of the plot-holes in Jack and the Beanstalk, Booker, Sheldon, Wade, and Roy write their own conclusion. "The Garfield Opera": A musical set to Dance of the Hours based on Garfield's overeating habits is performed in a "serious cultural moment" provided by the Buddy Bears.
85	12	"Dummy of Danger"	October 24, 1992	512
85	12	"Sooner or Later"	October 24, 1992	512
85	12	"Jumping Jon"	October 24, 1992	512
"Dummy of Danger": Jon gets a dummy for an upcoming ventriloquist act. Garfield discovers that it is alive and plotting to invade the world and enslave mankind. Guest voice: Paul Winchell as Toy Shop Owner, Agent Kolak, and Supreme High Command. "Sooner or Later": The wolf tells Roy about procrastination, and Roy spreads the word to the rest of the farm (except Orson) and starts a procrastinators meeting. "Jumping Jon": Garfield hosts a show about "great moments in stupidity" after Jon takes up skydiving.
86	13	"Sound Judgment"	October 31, 1992	513
86	13	"Gross Encounters"	October 31, 1992	513
86	13	"The Perils of Penelope"	October 31, 1992	513
"Sound Judgment": When the sound effects supervisor quits, Garfield gives Odie the job of putting sound effects into the show. "Gross Encounters": After Orson reads a book about aliens, everyone else on the farm gets addicted to them. It gives the wolf an idea to make everyone think there are aliens around, so that he can get the chickens. "The Perils of Penelope": After dumping Brick, Penelope wants Garfield as her new boyfriend. Garfield is terrified of being near Penelope due to a threat from Brick.
87	14	"The Cartoon Cat Conspiracy"	October 31, 1992	514
87	14	"Who Done It?"	October 31, 1992	514
87	14	"The Picnic Panic"	October 31, 1992	514
"The Cartoon Cat Conspiracy": Garfield complains about cartoons starring cats, and makes his own. "Who Done It?": Three dogs named Who, What, and Where come to work on the farm. For Roy and Wade, it quickly turns into an Abbott and Costello-type nightmare as they desperately try to figure out their names. "The Picnic Panic": In a musical episode, Garfield tries to keep ants from ruining a picnic prepared by Jon.
88	15	"Ghost of a Chance"	November 7, 1992	515
88	15	"Roy Gets Sacked"	November 7, 1992	515
88	15	"Revenge of the Living Lunch!"	November 7, 1992	515
"Ghost of a Chance": A ghost must prove his worth and scare Garfield. Guest voices: James Earl Jones as Diablo and Will Ryan as McCraven. "Roy Gets Sacked": Worried that Orson might fire him, Roy quits the show again and returns to The Buddy Bears. "Revenge of the Living Lunch!": In the fourth "Garfield's Tales of Scary Stuff" episode, Garfield is attacked by the contents of the refrigerator when they are brought to life by a meteorite that is given away as a fruitcake for 37 years.
89	16	"Super Sonic Seymour"	November 7, 1992	516
89	16	"A Mildly Mental Mix-Up"	November 7, 1992	516
89	16	"The Garfield Rap"	November 7, 1992	516
"Super Sonic Seymour": In an attempt to get organized faster, Jon hires a salesman named Super Sonic Seymour, who cons him into doing way too many chores at a quick pace, to the point that he does not have time to feed his pets. Guest voice: John Moschitta Jr. as Super Sonic Seymour. "A Mildly Mental Mix-Up": A psychiatrist badger named Edward R. Furrow counsels Wade while the wolf cons Roy into winning a vacation to Fiji in an attempt to steal the chickens. "The Garfield Rap": Garfield sends in his music video to Meow TV, which becomes the top #1 video of the week.

=== Season 6 (1993) ===
No. overall	No. in season	Title	Original release date	Prod. code
90	1	"A Vacation From His Senses"	September 18, 1993	601
90	1	"The Incredibly Stupid Swamp Monster"	September 18, 1993	601
90	1	"Dread Giveaway"	September 18, 1993	601
"A Vacation From His Senses": Garfield manages to convince Jon to skip going on a vacation. It backfires as Jon gets Garfield and Odie involved with chores. Garfield tries to rectify the mistake by tricking Jon into thinking that he has gone crazy due to being overworked, thus requiring a vacation. "The Incredibly Stupid Swamp Monster": A giant robot falls into a bunch of mud and is mistaken for a swamp monster. Meanwhile, the weasel once again tries to steal the chickens. "Dread Giveaway": After learning about infomercials, Nermal has a dream that Garfield is giving him away in one.
91	2	"The Wright Stuff"	September 18, 1993	606
91	2	"Orson Express"	September 18, 1993	606
91	2	"Safe at Home"	September 18, 1993	606
"The Wright Stuff": Garfield tells the story of Orville Wright's cat, McKinley, the actual inventor of the model airplane. "Orson Express": Orson and Booker must deliver a package, and once they arrive at the destination, they have a big, angry dog to contend with. "Safe at Home": After Jon's house gets robbed, a maximum security system is installed. When Jon, Garfield and Odie return from a movie, they are trapped outside as they are unable to enter without a password that they do not know. Guest voice: Don Knotts as Mr. Fluster.
92	3	"Jon the Barbarian"	September 25, 1993	602
92	3	"Uncle Roy to the Rescue"	September 25, 1993	602
92	3	"The Kitten and the Council"	September 25, 1993	602
"Jon the Barbarian": Garfield tells a story about Jon being in love with a bully warrior's wife. "Uncle Roy to the Rescue": Roy's niece, Chloe, comes to visit while Roy goes on a date. However, the Weasel shows up and kidnaps Chloe, forcing Orson and Roy to work together and save her. "The Kitten and the Council": Nermal is brought before the Kitty Council on charges of being too cute.
93	4	"Next-Door Nuisance"	September 25, 1993	605
93	4	"What's It All About, Wade?"	September 25, 1993	605
93	4	"Bigfeetz"	September 25, 1993	605
"Next-Door Nuisance": Jon's neighbors move out because Garfield constantly steals their food. They are replaced by a constantly singing man named Larry Lark. Guest voice: Bill Kirchenbauer as Larry Lark. "What's It All About, Wade?": Orson and Roy bring Wade to a professor to discuss all his fears and phobias. When Orson and Roy are chased by wild horses, Wade runs out of the cartoon and onto blank paper where their cartoonist talks to him (Wade Duck) into going home to save his friends before it is too late. "Bigfeetz": Jon, Garfield, and Odie go on a search for a legendary creature named Bigfeetz.
94	5	"Canine Conspiracy"	October 2, 1993	603
94	5	"Snow Wade and the 77 Dwarfs"	October 2, 1993	603
94	5	"The Genuine Article"	October 2, 1993	603
"Canine Conspiracy": In an episode of "The Garfield Crime Files", Garfield tells the story of how Odie was wrongfully accused of snatching purses. "Snow Wade and the 77 Dwarfs": The farm animals, including Chloe, act out a version of Snow White and the Seven Dwarfs, with Wade as Snow White and Roy as the prince. "The Genuine Article": Garfield runs into a cat named Gabriel, who acts exactly like Garfield, even going so far as to have his own "Tales of Scary Stuff". Guest voice: Thom Sharp as Gabriel
96	7	"The Pie-Eyed Piper"	October 9, 1993	607
96	7	"Fine-Feathered Funny Man"	October 9, 1993	607
96	7	"Sweet Tweet Treat"	October 9, 1993	607
"The Pie-Eyed Piper": Garfield tells a modified version of the story of the Pied Piper of Hamelin. "Fine-Feathered Funny Man": Roy tells everyone that he is giving up practical joking, then tries to resist doing any more pranks. "Sweet Tweet Treat": Garfield finally eats a bird (or so he thinks) and feels guilty about it, while the bird's father looks for him.
97	8	"The Floyd Story"	October 9, 1993	608
97	8	"How Now, Stolen Cow?"	October 9, 1993	608
97	8	"The Second Penelope Episode"	October 9, 1993	608
"The Floyd Story": Floyd and his wife ask for more time on the show. Meanwhile, Garfield is annoyed by Jon's aunt visiting and tries to get her out of the house. "How Now, Stolen Cow?": When Orson discovers that the barnyard cow has been stolen, he and Bo act as detectives in an attempt to solve the case. "The Second Penelope Episode": At a drive-in theater, Penelope becomes jealous when Garfield is seen with another female cat.
98	9	"Dr. Jekyll and Mr. Mouse"	October 16, 1993	609
98	9	"Payday Mayday"	October 16, 1993	609
98	9	"How to Drive Humans Crazy"	October 16, 1993	609
"Dr. Jekyll and Mr. Mouse": While microwaving a TV dinner, Garfield tells the tale of Dr. Jekyll with a monster mouse. Guest voice: Paxton Whitehead as Dr. Jekyll. "Payday Mayday": A sly fox named Finagler Fox invades the farm on payday and gets everyone's money, while Orson bans Roy from the farm, until he learns his lesson. After Wade, Booker, Sheldon and Bo get scammed by Finagler, Orson lifts Roy's ban so he can stop Finagler. "How to Drive Humans Crazy": Garfield gives an orientation to 4-week-old kittens on how to drive humans crazy.
99	10	"Date of Disaster"	October 16, 1993	610
99	10	"A Little Time-Off"	October 16, 1993	610
99	10	"The Longest Doze"	October 16, 1993	610
"Date of Disaster": A young woman named Monica asks Jon out in an attempt to get back at her tough-guy father. "A Little Time-Off": Fearing that she is overworked, Orson tries to get Lanolin to take a pretend vacation. "The Longest Doze": Garfield attempts to get in the Gazorninplat Book of World Records by taking the world's longest nap.
100	11	"Stairway to Stardom"	October 23, 1993	611
100	11	"Return of the Incredibly Stupid Swamp Monster"	October 23, 1993	611
100	11	"The Life and Times of the Lasagna Kid"	October 23, 1993	611
"Stairway to Stardom": While waiting to be served at a restaurant, Garfield tells Odie the story of how Garfield was once part of a comedic duo. Guest voice: John Byner as Jackie Melman. "Return of the Incredibly Stupid Swamp Monster": The swamp monster robot returns, while its owner looks for it. "The Life and Times of the Lasagna Kid": An Old West tale features Garfield as the Lasagna Kid who must save a kidnapped damsel named Miss Mona.
101	12	"Magic, Monsters and Manicotti"	October 23, 1993	612
101	12	"The Midnight Ride of Paul Revere's Duck"	October 23, 1993	612
101	12	"Unreal Estate"	October 23, 1993	612
"Magic, Monsters and Manicotti": Jon dreams about himself playing "Magic and Monsters" and trying to recover the bottomless wallet. "The Midnight Ride of Paul Revere's Duck": When Roy feels like Wade has gotten more attention on the show than him, he creates his version of The Midnight Ride of Paul Revere, that involves Wade to get more attention. "Unreal Estate": Jon buys a cheap house, unaware that it is haunted.
102	13	"Lost and Foundling"	October 30, 1993	613
102	13	"Winter Wonderland"	October 30, 1993	613
102	13	"Films and Felines"	October 30, 1993	613
"Lost and Foundling": While playing hide and seek, Odie winds up with a little girl named Becky, who wants a dog despite her father not allowing dogs. "Winter Wonderland": To keep warm in freezing weather, Orson reads books about swimming at the beach. "Films and Felines": Garfield informs the audience of the history of cats in movies, while a fact-checker disputes his claims.
103	14	"The Garfield Musical"	October 30, 1993	615
103	14	"Mind Over Melvin"	October 30, 1993	615
103	14	"Madman Meets His Match"	October 30, 1993	615
"The Garfield Musical": A musical is performed about Penelope falling in love with a rock-and-roll cat. "Mind Over Melvin": Orson meets an alien named Melvin who gives him the power to read minds. To test it, Orson goes on Roy's game show, You Can't Win. "Madman Meets His Match": Demented Dave, a salesman similar to Madman Murray, competes with Murray to get Jon as a customer. Guest voice: Rip Taylor as Demented Dave.
104	15	"Knights and Daze"	November 6, 1993	614
104	15	"Holiday Happening"	November 6, 1993	614
104	15	"Jailbird Jon"	November 6, 1993	614
"Knights and Daze": Jon writes a letter requesting tickets for him and his girlfriend to a taping of National Knights. His letter accidentally winds up in a file requesting to challenge a knight named Boulder to a battle. "Holiday Happening": Wade is upset at Roy's "Hit a Duck in the Face with a Lemon Meringue Pie Day", so Wade creates his own holiday as revenge. "Jailbird Jon": While visiting a prison to lecture inmates on cartooning, an inmate locks Jon in a closet and swaps clothes and places with him.
105	16	"The Third Penelope Episode"	November 6, 1993	616
105	16	"Hare Force"	November 6, 1993	616
105	16	"Garfield's Garbage Can and Tin Pan Alley Revue"	November 6, 1993	616
"The Third Penelope Episode": Garfield and Penelope imagine being married. "Hare Force": Orson, Booker, and Sheldon imagine a science-fiction version of the fable of The Tortoise and the Hare. "Garfield's Garbage Can and Tin Pan Alley Revue": Garfield and Floyd entertain the neighborhood pets with a revue show (with some assistance from Odie and Nermal). Garfield's antics end up keeping Jon awake.: Note: The episode is mistakenly named "Garfield's Garbage Can and Tin Pan Alley Review" in the title card.

=== Season 7 (1994) ===
No. overall	No. in season	Title	Original release date	Prod. code
106	1	"The Legend of Johnny Ragweedseed"	September 17, 1994	702
106	1	"Grape Expectations (Part 1)"	September 17, 1994	702
106	1	"Catch As Cats Can't"	September 17, 1994	702
"The Legend of Johnny Ragweedseed": In a spoof of Johnny Appleseed, Jon plants ragweed plants, which makes people sneeze. A country singer narrates the story, which annoys Garfield. "Grape Expectations (Part 1)": Roy is forced to guard the fruit in the barn, due to The Big Cock-A-Doodle coming to check on him. When Wade eats a grape, Roy goes to the supermarket to buy a replacement, only to be stuck in a long line-up at the checkout. When he finally returns, he does not notice that Booker has also eaten a grape from the harvest, and fails to replace it. The Big Cock-A-Doodle declares that Roy must be punished. "Catch As Cats Can't": Garfield must save Ludlow from another cat who attempts to eat him.
107	2	"A Matter of Conscience"	September 17, 1994	703
107	2	"Grape Expectations (Part 2)"	September 17, 1994	703
107	2	"Top Ten"	September 17, 1994	703
"A Matter of Conscience": A cricket named Ichabod agrees to be Garfield's conscience to help keep him out of trouble. "Grape Expectations (Part 2)": The Big Cock-A-Doodle puts Roy on trial for being a bad rooster. The other farm animals head over to clear Roy's name. "Top Ten": Garfield gives top ten lists on how he can tell he has had enough to eat, why Jon's dates end badly, things he hates to find on the table, and how a robbery will be foiled.
108	3	"Change of Mind"	September 24, 1994	701
108	3	"Temp Trouble"	September 24, 1994	701
108	3	"The Perfect Match"	September 24, 1994	701
"Change of Mind": A wish on a shooting star causes Nermal and Garfield switch personalities for a day. Change of Mind is the only "Tale of Scary Stuff" not narrated by Garfield, who intends to sue Nermal – and, at the end of the episode, Jon – for stealing his "Tales of Scary Stuff" idea. "Temp Trouble": Orson goes on vacation and hires his cousin Aloysius to take his place. Aloysius gives Roy and Wade a hard time, handing out demerits over any offenses they make. Guest voice: Kevin Meaney as Aloysius. "The Perfect Match": Jon finds his ideal match: Jane Arbinkle, who shares all of Jon's flaws as well. Guest voice: Sheryl Bernstein as Jane Arbinkle.
109	4	"My Fair Feline"	September 24, 1994	704
109	4	"Double Trouble Talk"	September 24, 1994	704
109	4	"Half-Baked Alaska"	September 24, 1994	704
"My Fair Feline": Garfield gets kicked out of the house and wanders into an alley, where an animal trainer tries to train him into a proper cat. Guest voice: Harvey Korman as Professor Lamar. "Double Trouble Talk": Roy thinks he is doing too much work on the farm. When he meets a salesman from a double talk school, he buys a CD that teaches him how to keep Orson and Lanolin from making him do work. "Half-Baked Alaska": Jon has a job offer in Alaska that Garfield and Odie dislike, so they hire Ichabod to give Jon bad advice.
110	5	"Puss in Hi-Tops"	October 1, 1994	705
110	5	"Egg Over Easy (Part 1)"	October 1, 1994	705
110	5	"The Beast From Beyond"	October 1, 1994	705
"Puss in Hi-Tops": Garfield tells his rendition of Puss in Boots. Garfield is the titular cat, who uses trickery to win his new owner (Jon) fame and fortune. The king eventually wants him to be with his beautiful daughter—if he vanquishes a shapeshifting ogre. "Egg Over Easy (Part 1)": Orson and Bo tell a story about Wade, who became inspired by Sheldon to live life in an eggshell. "The Beast From Beyond": In the final episode of "Garfield's Tales of Scary Stuff", a dinosaur avoids extinction and attempts to conquer the Earth with a Barney & Friends-type TV show.
111	6	"Model Behavior"	October 1, 1994	706
111	6	"Egg Over Easy (Part 2)"	October 1, 1994	706
111	6	"Another Ant Episode"	October 1, 1994	706
"Model Behavior": Jon goes on a date with a supermodel, who is instead interested in Garfield. Guest voice: Tracy Scoggins as Heather St. Clair. "Egg Over Easy (Part 2)": Orson and Bo, now joined by Roy, continue the story where they left off: Wade, still in his egg shell, is held captive by the Weasel. "Another Ant Episode": The singing ants from "The Picnic Panic" return and invade Garfield's house. Jon and Garfield hire an exterminator to deal with the problem.
112	7	"The Guy of Her Dreams"	October 8, 1994	707
112	7	"The Discount of Monte Cristo"	October 8, 1994	707
112	7	"The Fairy Dogmother"	October 8, 1994	707
"The Guy of Her Dreams": In a musical, Penelope is unhappy with her repetitive dates with Garfield and imagines them going on adventures. "The Discount of Monte Cristo": When Orson reads the story of The Count of Monte Cristo, Aloysius continually tries to save money by cutting corners. "The Fairy Dogmother": In a Cinderella-esque tale, Garfield narrates the story of a fairy godmother named Esmeralda. Esmeralda grants Odie a wish to attend the Hound Dog Harvest Ball, where trouble emerges. Guest voice: Imogene Coca as Esmeralda.
113	8	"The Stand-Up Mouse"	October 8, 1994	708
113	8	"Daydream Doctor"	October 8, 1994	708
113	8	"Happy Garfield Day"	October 8, 1994	708
"The Stand-Up Mouse": A mouse named Myron moves in the Arbuckle house after Floyd leaves. When Myron finds out that Garfield does not chase mice, he uses Garfield for stand-up material. Guest voice: Rick Ducommun as Myron. "Daydream Doctor": After thinking he is too busy reading books and not guarding the chickens from the weasel, Orson asks therapist Edward R. Furrow for advice. "Happy Garfield Day": Jon discovers that Garfield's birthday is coming up, with the whole world reminding him.
114	9	"Sit on It"	October 15, 1994	709
114	9	"Kiddie Korner"	October 15, 1994	709
114	9	"Brainwave Broadcast"	October 15, 1994	709
"Sit on It": Garfield sits on a book that Jon is reading and refuses to move, no matter what Jon does. "Kiddie Korner": The animals' version of Doctor Zhivago is interrupted by the meddling Aloysius Pig, who insists they do "wholesome, educational" content: namely, nursery rhymes. Threatened with cancellation if they do not agree, everyone tries to stage a good skit. Aloysius then keeps interrupting with complaints about how each rhyme is "inappropriate". "Brainwave Broadcast": Garfield explains how humans can hear animal thoughts as if they were conversing normally, through the use of a special microphone. Demonstrating it leads Garfield to discover plans for a bank robbery, and he attempts to notify the police.
115	10	"Suburban Jungle"	October 22, 1994	710
115	10	"The Thing in the Box"	October 22, 1994	710
115	10	"The Feline Philosopher"	October 22, 1994	710
"Suburban Jungle": Jon's teenage niece sneaks off to the mall, where Garfield and Odie follow her. "The Thing in the Box": Everyone wonders what is in a box addressed to Bo, with most convinced it contains something scary. It turns out to be Nermal, whom Garfield had mailed away in an attempt to get rid of him. "The Feline Philosopher": When Garfield fails to get a pie from a windowsill, he is given motivational speeches by a philosopher cat. Guest voice: Eddie Lawrence as The Feline Philosopher.
116	11	"Thoroughly Mixed-Up Mouse"	October 29, 1994	711
116	11	"The Old Man of the Mountain"	October 29, 1994	711
116	11	"Food Fighter"	October 29, 1994	711
"Thoroughly Mixed-Up Mouse": Garfield motivates Floyd's friend, Irwin, into thinking he is a cat. Guest voice: Arnold Stang as Irwin. "The Old Man of the Mountain": When Wade finds Gort sleeping in his bed, he seeks advice to get Gort out of his home. "Food Fighter": Jon is hired to cook for a heavyweight champion. Guest voice: George Foreman as George Fisticuff.
117	12	"The Jelly Roger"	November 5, 1994	712
117	12	"The Farmyard Feline Philosopher"	November 5, 1994	712
117	12	"Dogmother 2"	November 5, 1994	712
"The Jelly Roger": In another episode of "The Garfield Crime Files", a TV repairman assumes the personality of his ancestor -- a food-plundering pirate. "The Farmyard Feline Philosopher": In a follow-up to "The Feline Philosopher," the philosopher gives Orson, Roy, Wade, and the Weasel advice. Guest voice: Eddie Lawrence as The Feline Philosopher. "Dogmother 2": In a sequel to "The Fairy Dogmother," Esmerelda is assigned to grant Garfield's wish to get revenge on a dog. Since she forgets his wish, she grants every wish Garfield, Odie and Jon make. Guest voice: Imogene Coca.
118	13	"Alley Katta and the 40 Thieves"	November 19, 1994	713
118	13	"If It's Tuesday This Must Be Alpha Centauri"	November 19, 1994	713
118	13	"Clash of the Titans"	November 19, 1994	713
"Alley Katta and the 40 Thieves": Garfield tells the story of the 40 thieves, with his own twist. Guest voice: Bill Saluga as the Sultan. "If It's Tuesday This Must Be Alpha Centauri": Orson and the gang take a pretend trip to various planets. Meanwhile, Orson's brothers try to steal their vegetables. "Clash of the Titans": Garfield and Odie find themselves in the wrong cartoon again; this time, it is an X-Men spoof. Garfield and Odie's new friends help Jon out of a conniving sleazy salesman's grasp. Guest voices: Mark Hamill as Mesmer and Kurdman and Sharon Mack as Ultra.
119	14	"Canned Laughter"	November 26, 1994	714
119	14	"Deja Vu"	November 26, 1994	714
119	14	"The Man Who Hated Cats"	November 26, 1994	714
"Canned Laughter": Jon builds a comedy robot out of his old refrigerator. It ends up going wild around the house. "Deja Vu": Orson, Roy, Wade, and the Weasel keep getting stuck in what they have done before. Meanwhile, Wade begins to have trouble pronouncing the weasel's name. "The Man Who Hated Cats": In a musical episode, Jon gets a new neighbor who detests cats. Garfield finds out the reason behind the man's hatred and reunites him with a cat he had as a child, causing him to like cats again. Guest voice: George Hearn as Theodore Block.
120	15	"The Horror Hostess (Part 1)"	December 3, 1994	716
120	15	"Newsworthy Wade"	December 3, 1994	716
120	15	"The Horror Hostess (Part 2)"	December 3, 1994	716
When Jon gets a crush on horror movie hostess Vivacia, Garfield and Odie give him an opportunity to date her. Guest voices: Brinke Stevens as Vivacia and Don Messick as Spot the Dragon. "Newsworthy Wade": Wade appears on a TV news show to talk about his fears. Guest voice: Shelley Berman as Dick Drake. "The Horror Hostess (Part 2)": Garfield and Odie head out to rescue Jon (along with other men) from Vivacia and various horror creatures. Guest voices: Brinke Stevens as Vivacia and Don Messick as Spot the Dragon.
121	16	"Arbuckle the Invincible"	December 10, 1994	715
121	16	"The Monster Who Couldn't Scare Anybody"	December 10, 1994	715
121	16	"The Ocean Blue"	December 10, 1994	715
"Arbuckle the Invincible:" An alien spaceship's force field sphere lands in Jon's back pocket. It makes Jon invincible as long as he has the sphere in his possession. To take advantage of the job, Jon attempts a dangerous stunt to earn money. "The Monster Who Couldn't Scare Anybody": Orson tells Booker and Sheldon the story of a young monster having difficulty in scaring anyone. "The Ocean Blue": Told in song, Garfield, Jon, and Odie vacation at the beach, where they wind up in trouble during a shark encounter. (NOTE: The Ocean Blue is the series finale.)

== Crossover special (1990) ==
Title	Directed by	Written by	Original release date
Cartoon All-Stars to the Rescue	Directed by: Milton Gray, Marsh Lamore, Bob Shellhorn, Mike Svayko; Supervising director: Karen Peterson	Duane Poole and Tom Swale	April 21, 1990
Michael is a teenage boy who secretly uses marijuana, straining his relationship with his parents and younger sister Corey. Many cartoon characters come to life from objects in Corey's room and find Michael's stash, teaming up to give him an intervention and discourage him from using drugs. Garfield is among the characters, with Lorenzo Music reprising his role from Garfield and Friends.
