= Garfield and Friends =

American animated television series

- Promotional picture for Garfield and Friends, showing most of the show's primary characters (clockwise from bottom-left: Sheldon, Wade, Orson, Odie, Garfield, Roy and Booker)
- Genre: Comedy; Animated sitcom Slapstick
- Created by: Jim Davis
- Based on: Garfield and U.S. Acres by Jim Davis
- Written by: Mark Evanier; Sharman DiVono
- Directed by: Jeff Hall (1989–1991); Tom Ray (1989–1990); Dave Brain (1992–1994); Vincent Davis (1991–1994); Ron Myrick
- Starring: Lorenzo Music as the voice of Garfield
- Voices of: Gregg Berger; Thom Huge; Desirée Goyette; Howard Morris; Frank Welker; Julie Payne
- Opening theme: "Friends Are There" (seasons 1–2); "We're Ready to Party" (seasons 3–6 (CBS airings), seasons 3-7); "Garfield and Friends rap" (season 7 (CBS airings))
- Composers: Ed Bogas; Desirée Goyette
- Country of origin: United States
- Original language: English
- No. of seasons: 7
- No. of episodes: 121 (363 segments) (list of episodes)

Production
- Executive producers: Jim Davis (Seasons 4–7); Lee Mendelson (Seasons 4–7); Phil Roman
- Producers: George Singer (Seasons 1–2); Mitch Schauer (Season 2); Bob Curtis (Seasons 2–3); Bob Nesler (Seasons 3–4); Vincent Davis (Seasons 4–7)
- Production locations: Woodland Hills, California; Chicago; Muncie, Indiana
- Running time: 23 minutes (7 minutes per segment)
- Production companies: Film Roman; United Media Productions; Paws, Inc.; Lee Mendelson Film Productions

Original release
- Network: CBS
- Release: September 17, 1988 – December 10, 1994

Related
- The Garfield Show; Garfield Originals; Garfield

Garfield and Friends is an American animated television series based on the comic strip Garfield by Jim Davis. The show aired on CBS as part of its Saturday morning children's lineup from September 17, 1988 to December 10, 1994.

The show features animated story lines adapted from the comic strip Garfield and Davis's other comic strip U.S. Acres. Mark Evanier was the show's head writer. Lorenzo Music provided the voice of Garfield the cat, the strip's title character, as he had done since Here Comes Garfield in 1982. Other voices present on the show included Thom Huge as Jon Arbuckle, Garfield's human owner, and Gregg Berger as Odie the dog, also returning from prior Garfield animated media. Berger and Huge also respectively voiced Orson Pig and Roy Rooster in the U.S. Acres segments. 121 episodes were made, each consisting of two Garfield segments and one U.S. Acres segment and a "Garfield Quickie" at the end. All episodes have been released in the U.S. on five DVD sets by 20th Century Fox Home Entertainment.

The rights to the series are currently owned by Skydance Corporation as a result of its acquisition of Paws, Inc. on August 6, 2019. However, 9 Story Media Group currently distributes the show under license from Skydance.

== Content ==
Garfield is an American comic strip created by Jim Davis and started in 1978. The comic strip was first adapted into animated form in 1980 for the special The Fantastic Funnies, but reached a wider audience in 1982 with the television movie Here Comes Garfield on CBS. Garfield was adapted into eleven more animated television specials for the network, ending with Garfield Gets a Life in 1991. Garfield and Friends was also made for CBS, and debuted on the network in 1988. The network first announced in April 1988 that the show would be joining the Saturday morning cartoon lineup alongside The Adventures of Raggedy Ann and Andy and Superman.

Each half-hour episode of the show typically consists of two segments adapted from Garfield and one adapted from U.S. Acres, a comic strip also created by Davis which began in 1986. These segments featured original story lines written using the characters from each strip, although both segments featured original characters not present in the source material as well. Nearly every episode of the show was written or co-written by Mark Evanier.

== Segments ==
=== Garfield ===
The segments adapted from Garfield feature the same primary characters as the comic strip. The title character, Garfield, is a greedy and laid-back orange tabby cat. His owner is a human named Jon Arbuckle, whose story lines include his failed attempts to date women and his frustrations of dealing with Garfield's mischief. Jon is also the owner of Odie, a yellow dog who is often the subject of Garfield's pranks. Other human characters in the Garfield and Friends segments include Dr. Liz Wilson, who is Garfield's veterinarian, and Binky the Clown, the star of his own television show within the series. Non-human characters include Nermal, a kitten who often visits Garfield to antagonize him; and the Buddy Bears, three bears who are also the star of their own television show.

=== U.S. Acres ===
The second comic strip adapted for the series, U.S. Acres, is set on a farm with various animals. The lead character is Orson, an imaginative pig who enjoys reading books. Accompanying him in these segments are Roy, a loud-mouthed rooster who enjoys pranking the others; Wade, a cowardly duck who wears an inner tube with a non-speaking head like his that changes its facial expression and direction to match his own; mellow Bo and abrasive Lanolin, two brother-sister sheep; and Booker and Sheldon, a pair of juvenile chickens. Orson's brothers Mort, Gort, and Wart regularly serve as the antagonists within the U.S. Acres segments. These segments would go by alternate titles internationally. In most of the world, these segments would be known as Orson's Farm, or Orson's Place in Canada.

== Voice cast ==
- Lorenzo Music as Garfield and Bertie Buddy Bear
- Thom Huge as Jon Arbuckle, Binky the Clown, Bobby Buddy Bear, Gort, and Roy
- Howard Morris as Wade and Wart
- Gregg Berger as Billy Buddy Bear, Floyd, Odie, Orson, and Herman Post
- Julie Payne as Lanolin and Dr. Liz Wilson
- Desirée Goyette as Nermal
- Frank Welker as Bo, Booker, Mort, and Sheldon

== Production ==
CBS had been pursuing Jim Davis for some time about developing a Garfield Saturday morning cartoon, due to the overwhelming success of the Garfield television specials. Davis always turned down such offers. Davis personally approved everything about the Garfield brand to maintain high quality, and felt that supervising a TV series would take up too much of his time. Davis said he would only do it CBS could find a writer he trusted.

CBS had Mark Evanier under contract to develop a Michael Jackson cartoon. When Michael Jackson declined to move forward on the series, CBS decided to put Evanier to work on developing a Garfield series. Davis and Evanier hit it off, and Davis felt confident in giving control of the TV series to Evanier. Davis also proposed that episodes should feature two Garfield short cartoon, and a U.S. Acres short cartoon as a way to prevent the show from becoming monotonous.

The series premiered as the number one Saturday morning cartoon in the fall of 1988. For its second season, CBS expanded it from a half-hour to one hour.

When the series made its streaming debut in 2018, the opening credit sequence had to be reanimated because the original footage was lost.

== Cancellation ==
Although the series was a success in the ratings at the time, it had become expensive to make and the Saturday morning cartoon format was in decline by the mid-1990s. Additionally, CBS as a whole was a distant third behind NBC and ABC for much of the series' run, and was in the middle of its cost-cutting by Laurence Tisch that resulted in CBS losing broadcasting rights to the National Football League for four years starting in 1994 and subsequently losing many longtime affiliates to Fox, which had outbid CBS for its NFL package. As a result, CBS proposed renewing the show for another season, albeit with significant budget cuts. Since the show did well in syndication, producers ended the series in 1994 with its seventh season.

== Episodes ==
Garfield and Friends consists of 121 episodes (and 363 segments) spanning seven seasons in total.

Season	Segments	Episodes	Originally released	
Season	Segments	Episodes	First released	Last released
1	39	13	September 17, 1988	December 10, 1988
2	78	26	September 16, 1989	December 16, 1989
3	54	18	September 15, 1990	November 17, 1990
4	48	16	September 14, 1991	November 9, 1991
5	48	16	September 19, 1992	November 7, 1992
6	48	16	September 18, 1993	November 6, 1993
7	48	16	September 17, 1994	December 10, 1994
Crossover			April 21, 1990	

== Reception and legacy ==
At the time of the series' release, critical reviews on it were generally negative. Charles Solomon of The Los Angeles Times wrote in 1988, "Garfield has lost all his feline qualities and become a crabby little man in a cat suit. With more than 3,500 Garfield products on the market, does anyone really need to see more of the character?" Gene Seymour of The Pittsburgh Press rated the show "D−", saying that the show "tries too hard to be hip and cool" and "the jokes are flat."

However, retrospective reviews of the series have been much more favorable. The quality of Garfield and Friends when compared with other animated television series from the 1980s is considered by animation historian Jerry Beck to "foreshadow the higher quality animation boom coming in the next decade." Hal Erickson says that "Garfield and Friends rapidly became the hub around which the rest of CBS' morning lineup was built," and it "seemed to get better with each passing season."

== Home media ==
=== Region 1 ===
In response to the financial success of Garfield: The Movie, 20th Century Fox Home Entertainment released all seven seasons of Garfield and Friends to Region 1 DVD in five volume box sets, with each set having 24–25 episodes on three discs. Each set features an image of Garfield with a U.S. Acres character. These DVD sets show the original telecast versions, rather than the edited versions once seen in syndication and on cable networks. As of October 2013, these releases have been discontinued and are out of print.

On May 25, 2016, 9 Story Media Group announced that they had acquired worldwide distribution rights to Garfield and Friends and planned to remaster the series in HD and re-release it on DVD. On January 15, 2019, 9 Story Media Group (distributed by Public Media Distribution through its SkipRope label) released a best-of set entitled 20 Garfield Stories on DVD in Region 1. They have subsequently begun re-releasing the series on DVD in Region 1 in complete season sets, season 1 was released on July 16, 2019, season 2 was released on November 5, 2019, and season 3 was released on October 27, 2020. A 6-disc set titled The Grumpy Cat Collection, containing the first three remastered seasons, was released on June 15, 2021.

== Syndication history ==
Garfield and Friends has been syndicated on television around the world, beginning in the late 1980s and remaining on air in present day. In Latin America, it played on Cartoon Network from 1993 to 2005, on Boomerang from 2005 to 2008, on Warner Channel from 1998 to 2002, and on Tooncast from 2008 to 2016. Currently, all four of these networks have lost the rights to the show. Televisa's Canal 5 also played the show for many years, from the mid-1990s to early 2000s.

In Australia, Garfield and Friends began syndication on Network Ten from 1988 to 1995. For the duration of its original run, it aired on cable television on Nickelodeon. Most recently it played on FOX8 from 2004 to 2006. But it came back and it was played on Eleven (Australian TV channel) from 2011 to 2014.

The United Kingdom and the United States remain the highest syndicators of the show. In the UK, it appeared on CITV from 1989 through 2002 (10 minutes per episode), on Sky1 from 1998 to 2002 (also 10 minutes per episode), and on Boomerang from 2003 to 2006 with Season 1 and 2 only. It also appeared on The Children's Channel from 1993 to 1996 in reruns.

In Ireland, Garfield and Friends aired on RTÉ TWO Monday to Friday at 6pm (followed by Home and Away); it replaced RTÉ teen magazine programme Jo Maxi and was eventually replaced by The Simpsons.

In the United States, the series appeared in syndication on local stations, distributed by The Program Exchange, between 1993 and 2006 (with broadcast stations running it into 2001). Only 73 of the 121 episodes were acquired by The Program Exchange. This was due to the producers selling syndication rights when the show was still on air and CBS wanting to keep the rights for certain episodes. Since the 73-episode syndication package performed well enough on stations already airing the show, acquiring the later episodes were deemed unnecessary. This syndication package also aired on TBS, TNT, and Cartoon Network from 1995 to 1997, and Nickelodeon from 1997 to 2000. In 2001, it appeared on Fox Family Channel (and later, ABC Family) until January 2002. Toon Disney aired it from 2003 to 2006. Boomerang carried it from 2006 to 2007, and again from 2019 to 2021. As of November 2018, Boomerang's subscription video on demand site offers over 50 episodes of the series. Starz Encore also aired it on its family channel. The series later gained its own 24/7 Pluto TV channel on September 7, 2021.

Garfield and Friends aired in Canada on the cable TV channel YTV from 1993 to 2001. The show was broadcast on Teletoon's 24-hour classic-animation network, Teletoon Retro, until the channel's shutdown on September 1, 2015.

Garfield and Friends was also broadcast in New Zealand in the late 1980s and early 1990s. It aired on TV3 as part of a wrapper programme for children called The Early Bird Show by airing on weekday mornings and then on Saturday mornings when the show was shifted to only airing on weekend mornings. Garfield and Friends aired on that show up until its cancellation in 1992.

The series was played on television in Singapore first airing on Channel 5 from 1990 to 1992 and later on Kids Central from 2004 to 2005.

Garfield and Friends aired in South Africa on M-Net as part of their children's block K-T.V. and was frequently shown numerous times. Garfield and Friends later aired on e.tv in the late 2000s.

=== UK broadcast history ===
- CITV (1989–2002)
- The Children's Channel (1993–1996)
- Sky1 (1998–2002)
- Boomerang (2003–2006)

== Streaming ==
In 2012, the series became available to purchase on the iTunes Store, Amazon Prime Video, and Google TV, along with the series being available to stream on Netflix and Hulu. The series is currently available on the Peacock app.

GarfieldEats had the show available as part of its app.

As of 2026, all seasons of the show are made available for free on YouTube.

=== Remastered ===
On October 25, 2018, it was announced that the first 30 episodes of Garfield and Friends will be made available to stream on Boomerang, in remastered form, starting on November 1, 2018. Since the original masters for the intro were lost, 9 Story Media Group created a new version, re-animated using Flash. All episodes from the first three remastered seasons were available to stream on Boomerang until that service's closure, while the remaining remastered seasons are available to stream on Tubi, Peacock, Plex, HappyKids and Paramount-owned Pluto TV.

== The Garfield Show ==
A new CGI series premiered in December 2008. Much of the creative team on Garfield and Friends also worked on this series, such as executive producer/creator Jim Davis and co-writer/voice director Mark Evanier.

Frank Welker replaced Lorenzo Music as the voice of Garfield due to Music's death in 2001 (Welker was chosen due to being able to approximate Music's voice well enough to fill in when Music was unable to provide Garfield's voice), while Wally Wingert replaced Thom Huge as the voice of Jon Arbuckle due to Huge's retirement in the same year. Other familiar voice actors have also appeared, some of them reprising their roles (such as Gregg Berger as Odie and Herman Post).

The series does not include the U.S. Acres series and characters, as well as other main characters from Garfield and Friends. In one episode, Binky the Clown is mentioned, to which Garfield then replies, "My contract says he's not allowed on this series."

== See also ==
- Heathcliff – an earlier animated series based on fellow comic strip feline Heathcliff
