= Down on the Farm =

Down on the Farm can refer to:

== Film ==
- Down on the Farm (1920 film), a 1920 silent film
- Down on the Farm (1921 film), a Felix the Cat animated film
- Down on the Farm (1935 film), a New Zealand film
- Down on the Farm (1938 film), a film directed by Malcolm St. Clair
- Down on the Farm (1941 film), a short film

== Television ==
=== Episodes ===
- "Blinky Bill Down on the Farm", The Adventures of Blinky Bill season 2, episode 10 (1995)
- "Down on the Farm", Beethoven episode 12b (1994)
- "Down on the Farm", Budgie the Little Helicopter series 1, episode 13 (1994)
- "Down on the Farm", Chrisley Knows Best season 7, episode 6 (2019)
- "Down on the Farm", Davey and Goliath season 2, episode 12 (1963)
- "Down on the Farm", Dino Dan season 2, episode 12 (2011)
- "Down on the Farm", Inspector Gadget season 1, episode 2 (1983)
- "Down on the Farm", Martha Speaks season 1, episode 5a (2008)
- "Down on the Farm", Noodle and Doodle season 2, episode 1 (2012)
- "Down on the Farm", Nova season 11, episode 19 (1984)
- "Down on the Farm", Out of the Box season 2, episode 21 (1999)
- "Down on the Farm", Pocoyo series 3, episode 50 (2010)
- "Down on the Farm", Rosie and Jim series 3, episode 15 (1995)
- "Down on the Farm", Run, Buddy, Run episode 8 (1966)
- "Down on the Farm", The Garfield Show season 1 episode 12a (2009)
- "Down on the Farm", The Rubbish World of Dave Spud season 2, episode 41 (2021)
- "Down on the Farm", The Stu Erwin Show season 4, episode 14 (1955)
- "Down on the Farm", Top Chef: New York episode 8 (2009)
- "Down on the Farm", Top Chef Canada season 3, episode 2 (2013)
- "Down on the Farm", Word Party season 1, episode 2 (2016)
- "Down on the Farm", What About Mimi? season 3, episode 5b (2002)
- "Down on the Farm", Wheelie and the Chopper Bunch episode 8b (1974)

=== Series ===
- Down on the Farm (1939 TV series), an early British television program that aired on BBC in 1939
- Down on the Farm (2015 TV series), a 2015 British television series that airs on CBeebies

== Music ==
- "How Ya Gonna Keep 'em Down on the Farm (After They've Seen Paree)?", a World War I-era song
- Down on the Farm (album), an album by Little Feat
- "Down on the Farm", a song by Joe Walsh on his album There Goes the Neighborhood
- "Down on the Farm", a song by U.K. Subs later covered by Guns N' Roses
- "Down on the Farm" (The Doors song), 1971
- "Down on the Farm" (Charley Pride song), 1985
- "Down on the Farm" (James Blundell song), 1992
- "Down on the Farm" (Tim McGraw song), 1994
- "Down on the Farm", a song by Parachute Express
