= Greatest Hits, Volume 2 (Charley Pride album) =

Grestest Hits, Volume 2

Greatest hits album by Charley Pride
- Released: May 1985
- Genre: Country
- Length: 29:38
- Label: RCA
- Producer: Blake Mevis, Norro Wilson

Charley Pride chronology
Power of Love (1984)	Grestest Hits, Volume 2 (1985)	The Best There Is (1986)

Greatest Hits, Volume 2 is a compilation album by American country music artist Charley Pride. It was released in May 1985 via RCA Records. The album includes the singles "Down on the Farm" and "Let a Little Love Come In".

== Track listing ==
No.	Title	Writer(s)	Length
1.	"Down on the Farm"	Troy Seals, Eddie Setser, John Greenebaum	3:43
2.	"Night Games"	Blake Mevis, Norro Wilson	2:42
3.	"I Don't Think She's in Love Anymore"	Kent Robbins	2:37
4.	"Mountain of Love"	Harold Dorman	2:47
5.	"Now and Then"	Randy Albright, Paul Nelson, Gene Nelson, Greenebaum	2:55
6.	"Let a Little Love Come In"	Bob McDill	2:57
7.	"Ev'ry Heart Should Have One"	Bill Shore, Byron Gallimore	2:54
8.	"You're So Good When You're Bad"	Ben Peters	3:26
9.	"Why Baby Why"	Darrell Edwards, George Jones	2:06
10.	"The Power of Love"	Gary Nicholson, Don Cook	3:31

== Chart performance ==
Chart (1985)	Peak position
US Top Country Albums (Billboard)	60
