= Let a Little Love Come In =

Single by Charley Pride

from the album Greatest Hits, Volume 2
- B-side: "Night Games"
- Released: May 1985
- Recorded: March 1985
- Studio: Music City Music Hall (Nashville, Tennessee)
- Genre: Country; Countrypolitan
- Length: 2:57
- Label: RCA Victor
- Songwriter(s): Bob McDill
- Producer(s): Blake Mevis

Charley Pride singles chronology
"Down on the Farm" (1985)	"Let a Little Love Come In" (1985)	"The Best There Is" (1985)

"Let a Little Love Come In" is a song written by Bob McDill, and recorded by American country music artist Charley Pride. It was released in May 1985 as the second single from his Greatest Hits, Volume 2 compilation album. The song became a top 40 hit on the Billboard country chart.

== Background and content ==
Charley Pride's sound a style began to transition more towards country pop rather than the traditional country of his earlier years. This style continued into the early 1980s while he was still on RCA Records. This sound was also exemplified on "Let a Little Love Come In," which was composed by Bob McDill. The song was recorded in March 1985 at Music City Hall, a studio located in Nashville, Tennessee. The session was produced by Blake Mevis, whom had previously composed material that Pride recorded. Mevis had also produced Pride's last single release, "Down on the Farm."

== Release and reception ==
"Down on the Farm" was released as a single via RCA Victor Records in January 1985. The song spent 11 weeks on the Billboard Hot Country Songs chart and peaked at number 34 on the list in August 1985. It was Pride's third single in over a decade to miss the country top ten. His previous releases, "Down on the Farm" and "Missin' Mississippi," also missed the country top ten. It was later released on Pride's 1985 compilation record entitled Greatest Hits Vol. 2.

== Track listings ==
7" vinyl single

- "Let a Little Love Come In" – 2:57
- "Night Games" – 2:42

== Chart performance ==
Chart (1985)	Peak position
US Hot Country Songs (Billboard)	34
