= Garfield (2026 TV series) =

Upcoming American animated television series

- Genre: Comedy
- Based on: Garfield by Jim Davis
- Voices of: Lamorne Morris; Joe Brogie
- Composers: Ali Shaheed Muhammad; Adrian Younge
- Country of origin: United States
- Original language: English

Production
- Executive producers: Dave H. Johnson; John Trabbic III
- Production companies: Paws, Inc.; Nickelodeon Animation Studios

Original release
- Network: Paramount+

Related
- Garfield and Friends; The Garfield Show; Garfield Originals

Garfield is an upcoming American animated television series created for the streaming service Paramount+, based on the comic strip by Jim Davis. Produced by Nickelodeon Animation Studio and Paws, Inc., it stars Lamorne Morris as the title character and Joe Brogie as Jon Arbuckle.

Garfield is scheduled to premiere on December 11, 2026, as the first fully 2D Garfield animated series since Garfield and Friends and the franchise's fourth television series overall.

== Premise ==
The show features Garfield, Jon and Odie as they move to a large city. Along with old characters like Garfield's girlfriend Arlene, the show introduces new ones like a sewer dwelling alligator and a mysterious bodega owner called Paulie.

== Cast ==
- Lamorne Morris as Garfield
- Joe Brogie as Jon Arbuckle
- Dave H. Johnson as Odie
- Alex Cazares as Nermal
- Michelle Ortiz as Arlene
- Molly Bernard as Liz

=== Guest stars ===
- Salli Saffioti as Jo/Mama
- John Trabbic III as Floyd
- Greg Beharrell as Paulie
- Grey DeLisle as Mom/Granny
- John DiMaggio as Victor
- Major Attaway as Dhonathan
- Sean Giambrone as Josh
- Brent Mukai as Roland

== Production ==
After Nickelodeon purchased Paws, Inc. in August 2019, the network reported that a new animated Garfield series was in development at Nickelodeon Animation Studio. The series wound up stuck in development for several years.

The series was officially announced in March 2026, with Lamorne Morris set to voice Garfield. Dave H. Johnson and John Trabbic III were also announced as showrunners, with Snipple Animation set to provide animation for all 80 episodes.

More cast and crew details were announced in November, including Joe Brogie voicing Jon Arbuckle and Adrian Younge composing alongside former A Tribe Called Quest group member Ali Shaheed Muhammad.
