= List of The Garfield Show episodes =

These are a list of episodes of The Garfield Show which consists of 107 episodes in total. Each episode is 22 minutes with each segment being 11 minutes. The series debuted on France 3 in France on December 22, 2008. It aired on Cartoon Network in the United States from November 2, 2009 to October 5, 2012. It premiered on Boomerang on February 4, 2013.

== Series overview ==
Series	Episodes	Originally released		
Series	Episodes	First released	Last released	Network
1	26	2 November 2009	23 December 2009	Cartoon Network
2	26	13 December 2010	28 June 2011	Cartoon Network
3	26	4 September 2012	5 October 2012	Cartoon Network
4	27	6 October 2015	2 September 2016	Boomerang
5	2	24 October 2016		Boomerang

== Episodes ==
=== Season 1 (2009) ===
The first season premiered on December 22, 2008 in France on France 3 and on November 2, 2009 in the United States on Cartoon Network, following a sneak peek on October 31, 2009.

No. overall	No. in season	Title	Written by	U.S. air date	French air date
1a	1a	"Pasta Wars"	Mark Evanier	November 3, 2009	December 22, 2008
In the outer reaches of the galaxy, a mother ship in the shape of a pressure cooker is home to some very strange creatures: space lasagna! Their ambition is to invade Planet Earth. When the space lasagna checks out Jon's neighborhood, they run into Odie. They think that all humans are just like him, and decide to invade. But unfortunately, they fail to take into account Garfield's greediness. The aliens look so much like lasagna, he can't resist them! Their plan to take over might fall through faster than they thought; after all, the one thing Garfield can never get enough of is lasagna.
1b	1b	"Mother Garfield"	Mark Evanier	November 3, 2009	December 29, 2008
Hunting birds is something Garfield gave up as a kitten. It's like eating mice : he just can't do it ! But when he finds a nest full of what look like abandoned eggs, Garfield puts his feline pride to one side and decides to hatch them. Garfield sleeps in a tree until the next morning, Harry, the stray, doesn't agree with this plan; he would love to put the newborn birds right on his dinner menu
2a	2a	"Orange and Black"	Mike Puley	October 31, 2009 (sneak peek); November 2, 2009 (official)	January 26, 2009
It's Halloween and Garfield has dressed up as Catzilla, a fierce wild cat monster, to go out trick or treating. He has painted stripes on his fur and added false teeth to complete his disguise. But what he doesn't know is that the monster has escaped from the zoo, and the neighbors are terrified of running into him. Garfield is busy trick or treating, going from door to door to collect candy. The suspicious police officers catch him and take him back to the city zoo. But it's a case of a mix and match identity: they have mixed up Garfield with the real monster, who's even gotten into Jon's house! Somebody good better discover the truth soon and free Garfield, otherwise he may end up in a zoo in Siberia forever.
2b	2b	"Freaky Monday"	Julien Magnat	November 2, 2009	January 26, 2009
Night has fallen and it's time for bed, but Odie is still full of energy and wants to play. Garfield throws him out. In the garden, Odie meets a Martian whose space-ship has broken down! To thank him for finding the missing piece of his ship, the Martian makes a Garfield/Odie body switch. Garfield ends up in Odie's body, and Odie in Garfield's! For Odie, life as a cat is really nice: he takes naps, eats as much lasagna as he wants; it's a great way to spend each day. On other hand, for Garfield, dog food and regular exercise are on the menu; what a disaster! They have to get things straightened out fast, even if for Garfield this means sticking up for Odie against the other neighborhood dogs.
3a	3a	"Bone Diggers"	Christophe Poujol	November 4, 2009	March 2, 2009
Odie digs up some bones and finds that they are from the very rare brachiosaurus. Garfield tries to sell them to the local museum, but Mrs. Brubaker, the museum owner, instead wants to demolish Jon's house to search for more brachiosaurus bones. This is Esmeralda Brubaker and Hercules' first appearance.
3b	3b	"The Robot"	Baptiste Heidrich	November 4, 2009	March 2, 2009
Jon begins to notice that Garfield and Odie are more frequently causing messes around the house. Coincidentally, a salesman arrives at the house to sell Jon a highly technological cleaning robot. Jon accepts a trial of the robot before considering the purchase of one, but the robot becomes highly aggressive and violent when it is cleaning up after Garfield and Odie.
4a	4a	"Catnap"	Mathilde Maraninchi & Antonin Poirée	November 5, 2009	January 19, 2009
Garfield and Odie watch the news about a villain named Silent Jack, who robs houses while the housekeepers are away. Meanwhile, Jon has gone to the dentist to get his tooth fixed (leaving him unable to talk) and he forgot his key at the dentist. Garfield and Odie have been causing mayhem around the house and mistaken their owner for the villain.
4b	4b	"Agent X"	Mathilde Maraninchi & Antonin Poirée	November 5, 2009	January 19, 2009
Nermal meets a cat so called "Agent X" who claims to be a Secret Agent, but in reality, he is just a runaway cat trying to impress the crowd. Garfield becomes jealous as Agent X tells everyone about his adventures of saving people. He soon discovers the true identity of Agent X (Fluffykins), and then turns around the tables in his way to get back his fame.
5a	5a	"A Game of Cat and Mouse"	Christopher Poujol	November 6, 2009	December 22, 2008
Garfield doesn't like eating mice. As long as they don't get in his way, he's happy to have them around and lets them do whatever they want. But when his friend Squeek invites his big mouse family over to stay at Jon's, they take over the whole house: they settle in the cupboards, in the drawers, even in the wash basin! They also clean out the refrigerator. This is too much for Jon, who decides to remind Garfield of his duties as a house cat, and ‘mouser’. If he can't get rid of the mice, Garfield will get no lasagna for at least a year, and Jon will call in a pest control expert, but that will mean kissing Garfield's buddy Squeek goodbye for ever.
5b	5b	"Perfect Pizza"	Mark Evanier	November 6, 2009	December 29, 2008
Are any pizzas better than Vito's? Of course not. But Jon thinks they could certainly find cheaper: they could go to Mama Meany, who is a nasty piece of work, more crook than cook, not very Mama at all. He has invented a machine: called the Pizzagrande 7000 which can pump out 10 pizzas per minute, all totally bland and completely inedible.
6a	6a	"King Nermal"	Julien Magnat	November 12, 2009	February 2, 2009
Nermal lives with Garfield and Odie for ten days because his owner is out of town. When Nermal fakes a leg injury, Jon feels pity for Nermal, making Garfield and Odie do whatever he requests. Garfield and Odie attempt to get rid of him so they can live normally once again.
6b	6b	"Desperately Seeking Pooky"	Julien Magnat	November 12, 2009	February 2, 2009
Jon trips over Odie, and the dish of lasagna he was carrying ends up all over Pooky, Garfield's favorite teddy bear. A quick spin in the washing machine gets him clean again, but now he has to hang outside on the washing line to dry. The next morning, Pooky is gone! Garfield is desperate, and looks for him everywhere. Jon tries to distract him by giving him new teddy bears, such as the Teddy 2000, a robot-bear which could never replace the real Pooky in Garfield's heart. In the meantime, Odie has tracked down Pooky: Hercules, the dog next door, has stolen him! He doesn't want to give him back, but it's not to be mean, it's just because he doesn't have many friends to play with. There's a very simple solution to that which will give Hercules a friend to play with.
7a	7a	"High Scale"	Peter Berts	November 13, 2009	March 9, 2009
Jon and Garfield go to see Liz at her office. Liz jumps at the opportunity to weigh Garfield with her new high-tech talking scales. And unsurprisingly, the scales think Garfield is too heavy! Liz gives him a week to lose weight, otherwise she's sending him to the cat fat farm. Garfield doesn't take her seriously at first and keeps eating as normal when he gets home. But during his nap, he finds his motivation: after everything he has gobbled down, he has a nightmare: he's trapped in the fat farm from hell!
7b	7b	"Jon's Night Out"	Baptiste Heidrich & Julien Monthiel	November 13, 2009	March 9, 2009
Jon hasn't been sleeping well for a while. Garfield and Odie do their best to help him get a little shut-eye, but it's no good. They're about to give up, but maybe Dr. Somnanbulo will succeed where they have failed. His new machine, the hypno-snore might be able to cure Jon's insomnia. Jon tries it out, but the program goes haywire when Odie starts barking at a fly! After that, Jon falls asleep any time, any place, whenever Odie barks: in his car, at the dinner table, in the middle of talking to Liz... Things get worse when Jon starts sleepwalking through town in the middle of the night!
8a	8a	"Not So Sweet Sound of Music"	Mathilde Maraninchi & Antonin Poirée	November 16, 2009	January 12, 2009
Jon has unearthed an old accordion and Garfield can't stand the sound it makes. He therefore decides to get rid of it. But who needs an old accordion? He tries everything he can think of, with no luck. Each time, the accordion ends up where it started out, i.e. in Jon's hands. But Garfield doesn't give in that easily. He ends up burying it far away. At least nobody will come and look for it there. But of course the faithful Odie comes and digs the darn instrument up and takes it back to its owner once again… full of mud. The accordion is dead, but now Jon has another idea: he's gonna play the bagpipes instead.
8b	8b	"Turkey Trouble"	Laurent Bounoure & Jean-Noël Gabilan	November 16, 2009	January 12, 2009
Jon has won a turkey in a raffle and decides to cook it for dinner. Liz is coming over. The only problem is that when the turkey arrives, it's alive and kicking, and nobody wants to deal with it. Especially since it's kinda nice to have another pet, a feathered one this time. But when the turkey starts taking naps in Garfield's bed, watching TV and eating out of his bowl, Garfield loses it.
9a	9a	"Pup in the Pound"	Mark Evanier	November 18, 2009	January 5, 2009
A new law for dogs has just been introduced: any dog which goes out without a tag on its collar will be thrown into the pound without further ado. Odie, who is messing around with Garfield as usual, loses his tag without realizing it. And of course, when he goes out into the garden, he gets caught by two guards and dragged off to the dog pound. Jon notices he's gone missing and orders Garfield to find him again. There'll be no dinner until he does, and it's lasagna tonight! Garfield therefore heads off to the pound, even though there's no entry for cats. He uses his cunning and dresses up as a dog in order to sneak in and rescue his faithful friend. But then who will get him out?
9b	9b	"Odie in Love"	Julien Magnat	November 18, 2009	January 5, 2009
Jon comes back from the supermarket with a pet brush he has bought. Garfield isn't keen on the idea since he can take care of his own hygiene, but Odie doesn't mind trying it out. He likes it so much that he falls in love with the brush and swears never to leave it. Garfield doesn't think much of Odie's affair; in fact he's a bit jealous, and decides to get rid of the brush. The next morning, Odie's sweetheart has disappeared, and the poor lovelorn pup starts howling at the top of his lungs. Garfield can't take it for long; he 'fesses up and sets off to hunt down the lost brush with Odie. Too bad if it takes them all the way across town to the scary rubbish dump.
10a	10a	"Pet Matchers"	Mike Puley	November 19, 2009	February 23, 2009
It's a day like any other at Jon's house, and Jon and Garfield are squabbling for no reason. It can't go on : to help them make up and get some peace and quiet, Odie and Squeek have an idea: there's a new TV game show which aims to find out if pets and their masters are really made for each other. Odie is confident that things will calm down once the show has proven Garfield and Jon make a good team. But his cunning plan quickly goes horribly wrong: the Compatriton machine, which never gets anything wrong, says they're incompatible. Garfield gets sent off to live with a boisterous kid called Jeremy, and Jon gets a new pet…. A frog!!
10b	10b	"Lucky Charm"	Julien Magnat	November 19, 2009	February 23, 2009
Our three heroes have no luck: they've gone fishing but the good weather report never warned them it would pour with rain! To fight off his boredom, Garfield sends Odie to the end of a rainbow, promising that if he makes it before the rainbow disappears, he'll find a pot full of gold. Odie, who makes a good sleuth, finds it and brings it back to Garfield, much to the despair of its owner, a sad little leprechaun. If Garfield agrees to give the pot of gold back, all his dreams will come true. Garfield decides to get lucky. Overnight, he turns into a multi-billionaire! But if at first he enjoys the lap of luxury, he soon realizes that money isn't everything. How can he get his old life back, when he's the victim of such excellent luck?
11a	11a	"The Curse of the Were-Dog"	Julien Magnat	November 20, 2009	February 9, 2009
It's night-time and the full moon and the alignment of the planets are having a strange effect on Odie. He turns into the monstrous Were-Dog and wreaks havoc in Jon's house. The living room is a wreck, and the dish of lasagna has disappeared. Of course, Jon immediately thinks Garfield is behind all this, until he discovers on the news that his dog Odie might be the real villain. To get to the bottom of the villain's transformation, he goes to see the professor who first noticed the planet movements above. When they meet, the professor reassures him; the planets will only stay aligned for a while, then everything should go back to normal. Unless…
11b	11b	"Meet the Parents"	Amelie Aubert & Jessica Menendez	November 20, 2009	February 9, 2009
It's D day! Jon is finally going to meet Liz's parents, Robert and Betty. Everything has to be perfect, starting with Odie and Garfield, who seem determined to mess things up for him. Liz's parents arrive and there's a bit of an atmosphere. Until Betty brings out her little canary, Mimosa. Garfield starts drooling; the canary would make a great appetizer. He quickly realizes that Mimosa feels trapped and wants to escape from Betty, whose attention is smothering him. The bedroom window is open and it's the opportunity he's been dreaming of, so Mimosa flies away. Betty feels desperate; she has lost her darling little bird. It's all Garfield's fault, but then again, some people are more than happy to see the back of the bothersome bird.
12a	12a	"Down on the Farm"	Christophe Poujol	December 2, 2009	February 16, 2009
Jon goes to visit his brother Doc Boy who lives on a livestock farm. It's out in the country, and since Garfield is a real city cat, it's no picnic for him! To make things worse, Doc Boy asks him to do some work: pile up some logs, wash down the windows, sweep up the leaves. Things really reach their low point when Garfield realizes there's no TV and no pizza. With Odie's help, he decides to fix this and convince all the farm animals they really need a TV at the farm. As soon as they get one, the chickens stop laying, the cows stop making milk and the horses refuse to work; it's hell for Doc Boy! Luckily, he comes across a TV show which will make his fortune. That will put an end to all his chores! Note: This is the first and only episode in the entire series in which Jon refers to Doc Boy as "Doc".
12b	12b	"The Pet Show"	Mathilde Maraninchi & Antonin Poirée	December 2, 2009	February 16, 2009
A pet show has been organized in town, and the 1st prize is a huge dish of lasagne. Garfield's mouth is already watering at the thought of it, and he decides to compete. Things get off to a bad start. He flunks the sign up, and Nermal has already gotten started! How will he ever win now? Luckily, Garfield can always count on Odie, his faithful friend, to help him out. Jon signs him up and Garfield coaches him for every part of the contest: his first task is to neutralize the competition; the second is to beat Nermal in the nicest pet test. But things get a bit more complicated when it comes to the test for the smartest pet!
13a	13a	"The Curse of Cat People"	Julien Magnat	December 3, 2009	March 16, 2009
Liz has just come back from a trip to Egypt and is visiting Jon. She has brought him an old mirror as a souvenir. But it's a magic mirror; one lick from Odie, and he and Garfield get sucked through a door into a parallel world! On the other side, the cats are waiting for their new Pharaoh to arrive, accompanied by his jackal.
13b	13b	"Glenda and Odessa"	Julien Magnat	December 3, 2009	March 16, 2009
Watch out everybody, the terrible twins Drusilla and Minerva are coming to visit their cousin Jon, and no sooner do they get there than they want to play all kinds of games with Garfield and Odie! The two friends are fleet of foot and get away fast... Outside, Garfield's nose leads him down a promising track: he can smell a barbecue. But he and Odie get there too late, and all the food is gone. Since they are in the wrong place at the wrong time, the two friends take the blame for the missing food. Threatened with the pound, they have to hide back at home and play tea parties with the twins. They soon find themselves dressed up as ladies! This is just too much for Garfield, who decides to escape again. But what if their costumes turned out to be the key to all of their problems?
14a	14a	"Underwater World"	Jim Davis	December 4, 2009	April 6, 2009
Jon's really happy; he has organized a day of fly-fishing, much to Garfield's dismay since he would rather have stayed home napping. Fishing's so boring ! And to make things worse, it's really hot, and they're not getting a bite. Ah, then Jon finally catches something! But when he looks away for a second, Odie lets the little fish on his line go, as he feels sorry for it. But he ends up getting dragged down into the water with it. At the bottom of the pond, Odie becomes friends with the fish he saved, as does Garfield who soon joins them. The two of them visit the underwater world and have all kinds of adventures, some fun, some pretty unpleasant...
14b	14b	"Family Picture"	Peter Berts	December 4, 2009	April 20, 2009
It's Liz's birthday, and Jon wants to give her a really special present. A family photo of him and his two faithful friends, Garfield and Odie. You would think there's nothing so easy as taking a family photo, but Jon soon realizes that getting the perfect pic is going to be a real challenge!
15a	15a	"Time Twist"	Christelle Chatel	December 8, 2009	March 30, 2009
When an alien stops at a supermarket on earth, Garfield mistakenly enters his space ship and travels through different planets but it becomes hard for him to survive.
15b	15b	"Time Master"	Philippe Vidal	December 8, 2009	April 13, 2009
Garfield has found a very special watch: it can stop time ! At first, he uses it to prolong nap times and meal times and play jokes on his friends, but then it turns against him when it gets stuck and the whole world around him freezes! Although Garfield quite enjoys the freedom this brings and the fun he can have with it at first, he quickly realizes that he's all alone and he'll have to take care of things himself if he wants a dish of lasagna, for example, or a pizza… So he'd better get things fixed fast, or he's gonna spend the rest of his life working to eat, and there's no way he can deal with that!
16a	16a	"Fish to Fry"	Baptiste Heidrich & Julien Monthiel	December 9, 2009	April 6, 2009
Liz has to go away for a few days and asks Jon to look after her goldfish while she is gone. When Garfield finds this out, all he can think about is the great fry-up he's gonna have. The next morning, Liz comes over with the fish and sets off on her trip. Garfield can hardly believe it : right there in his living room, there are all kinds of wonderful looking fish ! He immediately gets ready to chow down. Lunch time! But for once, his eyes are definitely bigger than his belly, and his lunch isn't going to go down without a fight!
16b	16b	"Little Yellow Riding Hood"	Philippe Vidal	December 9, 2009	April 13, 2009
Garfield, Odie and Jon are having a picnic by the lake: it's perfect weather for it. Jon has invited Liz, who has brought a huge cake for dessert! But a last minute guest is about to mess up all their plans! Odie has found a wolf cub in the woods and thinks it's so cute he wants to take care of it. First, he feeds it the whole cake, then he hides it so he can take it home later. Garfield gets wrongly accused by Jon, who punishes him as soon as they get home. The cub's mother follows them the whole way. This leads to a mad-cap chase all around the house as Mommy Wolf tries to get her paws on the cub Odie is so eager to hide!
17a	17a	"Fame Fatale"	Peter Berts	December 10, 2009	March 30, 2009
Liz and Jon come home with a VIP guest : the cat Sir Leo, who is a star looking for a few days of R & R. He has always been famous, but dreams of a normal, peaceful life. Surprisingly he looks like Garfield, who jumps at the chance of replacing him for a while: he doesn't mind a taste of a star's life! But soon, Garfield realizes that being a star is all work and no play. On the other hand, Sir Leo has started to enjoy his new life, and thinks that Garfield has a pretty good deal. Garfield will have to pull out all the stops and show who he really is if he wants to get his life with Jon back!
17b	17b	"Virtualodeon"	Philippe Vidal	December 10, 2009	March 23, 2009
A crazy scientist has invented an incredible new machine: the Virtualodeon which makes TV shows real! Unfortunately, the Virtualodeon isn't quite up to speed and Garfield ends up getting trapped inside his own TV. Now he's a part of the shows he used to watch: he gets chased by monsters, a giant chicken, a merciless presenter and a beautiful TV star... 3D TV is a real revolution; right, Garfield?
18a	18a	"It's a Cat's World"	Peter Berts	December 11, 2009	February 23, 2009
It's a day like any other at Garfield's house. He's sprawled in his armchair, but then gets sucked through a vortex into a new dimension and ends up in a parallel world where cats have replaced humans, and humans have replaced cats! At first, Garfield is surprised when sees Arlene coming to give Jon a check-up because he isn't feeling good. She reassures Garfield and then reminds him in passing that he's got work to do and he should get to it if he doesn't want to lose his job. Huh?! She's telling him he should get to work while Jon lazes around and watches TV all day? The world has totally turned upside-down!
18b	18b	"Mailman Blues"	Peter Berts	December 11, 2009	April 27, 2009
Garfield's favorite person to pick on (after Odie) is Herman the mailman, who has just had the very bad idea of taking a vacation. The young recruit who replaces him is optimistic and naive when he thinks that Garfield is a cute little cat and everything will turn out fine. This is a fatal error, since one of Garfield's favorite things is to make the mailman's life HELL! At first, everything goes fine for the mailman, but once Garfield gets up to cruising speed, his tricks are pretty nasty. But he might have found his match for once, coz this is war!
19a	19a	"Extreme Housebreaking"	Julien Magnat	December 14, 2009	March 23, 2009
Garfield is enrolled in Dr Whipple's obedience class after Jon secretly films his bad behaviour. While there, Garfield discovers Dr Whipple is not who he seems.
19b	19b	"Heir Apparent"	Mark Evanier	December 14, 2009	May 4, 2009
Doc Boy and Jon want to inherit their cousin's haunted estate, but in order to do so, one must stay there longer than the other.
20a	20a	"Carolling Capers"	Julien Magnat	December 12, 2009	April 27, 2009
After hearing children go door to door singing carols on TV, Garfield tries to go around singing carols for food.
20b	20b	"From the Oven"	Julien Magnat	December 15, 2009	May 4, 2009
Jon accidentally follows a monster movie instead of a cooking show's recipe while baking a cake. It becomes a villainous Frankenstein monster and attempts to kill him, Garfield and Odie for breakfast.
21a	21a	"Neighbor Nathan"	Christophe Poujol	December 16, 2009	May 11, 2009
Odie runs away from home, sick of Garfield's cruelty towards him. The new house he runs off to is the residence of a boy with the personality of a mad scientist named Nathan, who plans to use his new invention to transform Odie into a cockroach. It is up to Garfield to save Odie.
21b	21b	"History of Dog"	Kim Campbell	December 16, 2009	May 11, 2009
Garfield explains the history of dogs, which casts them in a negative light, much to the chagrin of Odie and his dog friends.
22a	22a	"Up a Tree"	Peter Berts	December 17, 2009	May 18, 2009
Odie becomes friends with a squirrel after he helps one recover from an accident.
22b	22b	"It's a Cheese World"	Philippe Vidal	December 17, 2009	May 18, 2009
Garfield tries to take Squeak and his friends to Eddie Gourmand's Cheeseland, where Harry is in charge of keeping mice out.
23a	23a	"Nice to Nermal"	Mark Evanier	December 18, 2009	May 25, 2009
Nermal steals Pooky after Garfield is mean to him, and blackmails Garfield into being nice to him. To get Pooky back, Garfield sends an e-mail asking Druscilla and Minerva to come over and play with Nermal.
23b	23b	"Out on a Limb"	Julien Magnat	December 18, 2009	May 25, 2009
Garfield, Jon, Odie and Nermal all get stuck in a tree, so they try to get help.
24a	24a	"Super Me"	Jim Davis	December 21, 2009	June 1, 2009
Garfield imitates a superhero so that Nermal will reward him with food, but gets caught up with the real superhero and a bank robbery caused by a villainous crime lord.
24b	24b	"Mastermind"	Julien Magnat	December 21, 2009	June 1, 2009
Garfield gets a device that reads people's minds and saves Vito's pizzeria from rioting alien masterminds.
25a	25a	"The Amazing Flying Dog"	Philippe Vidal	December 22, 2009	June 8, 2009
There's a house on fire and a young pup is crying for help: she thinks it's all over. But no – here comes Odie, the super dog! Odie then wakes up and tells Garfield that in his dream he was a super hero flying to the side of people in the need of help, and of course, Garfield makes fun of him. Odie gets mad and goes into a sulk. He wishes his dream was true. Then he could finally speak to the pretty stranger in his dreams. But when Garfield really gets into trouble, Odie puts his grudges aside and flies off to help him. And this time he REALLY flies. Go for it, Odie!
25b	25b	"The Last Word"	Julien Magnat	December 22, 2009	June 8, 2009
After Nermal makes a comment he doesn't appreciate about his appetite, Garfield bets him that he won't eat a thing for an hour. If he wins, Nermal will be banned from the house for a month. But if he loses, Garfield will be his slave for a whole week. Garfield's honor's at stake, so he accepts: he would rather deprive himself for a little while than have to put up with Nermal's whimsical cuteness any longer. But when you're waiting to chow down, an hour can seem long. Really long… Especially when everything reminds him of food: TV shows, the dinner Jon has just cooked, the groceries, and soon the whole kitchen seem to be calling his name. Will he manage to hold out ‘til the end?
26a	26a	"Iceman"	Philippe Vidal	December 23, 2009	June 15, 2009
The ice-cream man is back in town, except that this year, it's an ice-cream woman, and Garfield isn't always nice to her, even though he loves ice-cream. He makes her life hell and sneaks off with more and more of her wares every day. In the meantime, a prehistoric man is found in a block of ice and carted off to a history exhibition. When Garfield accidentally thaws him, he falls in love with Olga, the ice-cream seller and refuses to go back to the museum. It's up to Garfield, with a little help from Odie, to make things right with a surprising idea. Have you every seen a prehistoric cat?
26b	26b	"T3000"	Julien Magnat	December 23, 2009	June 15, 2009
There's a new employee at the pound: it's a robot with all the latest gadgets and its job is gonna be to make all the pets stick to the straight and narrow. Any pets who have missed a shot or who aren't wearing their nametags get thrown straight into jail by the villain. But Garfield, with a little help from his faithful friend Odie, is determined to put paid to the robot, and make peace with Al and Pete, the real pound employees, even if it means helping them get their jobs back. So long T3000!

=== Season 2 (2010–11) ===
No. overall	No. in season	Title	Written by	U.S. air date	French air date
27a	1a	"Ticket to Riches"	Mark Evanier	February 28, 2011	June 25, 2010
Who's never dreamed of winning the big jackpot in the lottery? Hey? Especially when you have bills piling up on your desk and you're totally broke. That's when you really start hoping for a miracle. Right, Jon? Especially since Garfield is still living life to the full and stuffing his face with pizza! Well, it's your lucky day, Jon!
27b	1b	"Gravity of the Situation"	Mark Evanier	February 28, 2011	June 25, 2010
Jon hasn't been feeling great recently. It shows in his cooking, which is revolting. Garfield can't take it any more! Ahhh, if only somebody had a job for Jon... Hey! You know what? Eddie Gourmand just called and hey! You know what? He wants Jon to illustrate his next cookery book! There's just one condition: He wants to taste Jon's cooking first to be sure it's good.
28a	2a	"The Art of Being Uncute"	Julien Magnat	March 1, 2011	June 22, 2010
Who's the cutest cat in the country? Nermal. And who's the clingiest, most annoying and most pretentious cat in the country? Also Nermal. Garfield's running out of ideas to get rid of him. Although maybe the beauty contest might work... the first prize is a six month long stay in Greenland. Not bad, huh?
28b	2b	"Night of the Bunny Slippers"	Julien Magnat	March 1, 2011	June 23, 2010
Aunt Ivy is coming to visit her nephew Jon, and that's how things start out. And then things get worse. Next, there's evil bunny slippers on the loose.
29a	3a	"Blasteroid"	Emmanuelle Aubert	March 2, 2011	June 29, 2010
Red alert! A huge asteroid is heading right for the Planet Earth! How can it be destroyed? With the space ship Jon designed a few years back? The only problem is it's only big enough for a dog and a cat to pilot it. No problem, Garfield and Odie decide to take on the mission, which turns out to be very dangerous, but extremely satisfying.
29b	3b	"The Big Sneeze"	Mark Evanier	March 2, 2011	June 28, 2010
Atchooo! It's crazy, Jon can't stop... atchoo!... sneezing. He must be allergic to something, but what? It's funny, as soon as Garfield gets anywhere near him... Atchoooo! Quick! Time to run some tests... Phew, they're negative. He's not allergic to cat fur. A shrink suggests Jon is letting out some repressed anger.
30a	4a	"The Spy Who Fed Me"	Mark Evanier	March 3, 2011	June 24, 2010
When Garfield has to lose ten pounds, Jon discovers he has been snacking between meals. Liz gives him a robot that will follow Garfield everywhere he goes to ensure he sticks to his diet.
30b	4b	"Meet Max Mouse"	Mark Evanier	March 3, 2011	June 29, 2010
Squeak's cat-hating cousin, Max, moves into Garfield's home and rallies the other mice to rebel against him. Meanwhile, Jon calls an exterminator named Mr. Pulver to come rid his house of them.
31a	5a	"The Haunted House"	Mark Evanier	March 4, 2011	June 22, 2010
Jon spends the day in Mr. Barker's new mansion to come up with a comic book idea. Unfortunately for him, the house is haunted by Garfield's own spirit (based on the plot generator story).
31b	5b	"Which Witch"	Mark Evanier	March 4, 2011	June 28, 2010
The twins, Druscilla and Minerva, come to visit. Garfield lures them over to the house of an elderly neighbor, who may or may not be a witch.
32a	6a	"Cyber Mailman"	Emmanuelle Aubert	March 7, 2011	July 1, 2010
Professor Bonkers creates a holographic mailman to prevent Herman from constantly being tormented by Garfield. When Garfield eats a taco nearby, its sauce drips into the machine, causing the cyber mailman to deliver an early edition of the newspaper.
32b	6b	"Odie for Sale"	Mark Evanier	March 7, 2011	June 30, 2010
Jon is in debt, and resorts to selling some of his possessions to pay the bill. When Garfield puts Odie on the stall for two cents, he is bought by the person Jon is being sued by, and it is up to Garfield to get him back.
33	7	"Home for the Holidays"	Jim Davis	December 13, 2010	June 21, 2010
It's the holiday season for Garfield and the whole gang. Jon has invited not only his parents and Doc Boy, but Liz's family as well, and so Garfield must be on his best behavior. But when Garfield runs into Arlene while she is gathering up food and blankets for the unwanted animals of the neighborhood, Jon's Christmas plans take a turn for the unexpected, prompting Garfield to learn that there's more to Christmas than opening presents and eating!
34a	8a	"Planet of Poultry"	Mark Evanier	March 9, 2011	June 23, 2010
Aliens from another planet plan to turn all the earth creatures into chickens.
34b	8b	"Honey, I Shrunk the Pets"	Christophe Poujol & Thomas Forwood	March 14, 2011	July 5, 2010
Nathan returns and shrinks Garfield with his shrink ray, and Garfield must find a way to return to normal size before anyone big finds him hiding.
35a	9a	"The Night of the Living Apparatuses"	Emmanuelle Aubert	June 14, 2011	July 8, 2010
Jon buys a new house monitoring software program, with an electronic assistant named Millie. After the house gets hit by lightning, Millie takes over the whole house.
35b	9b	"Land of Hold"	Mark Evanier	June 15, 2011	July 9, 2010
Garfield finds out what life would be like for people who spend their entire existence on hold waiting for their call to be picked up.
36a	10a	"Farm Fresh Feline"	Mark Evanier	March 8, 2011	July 1, 2010
Jon, Garfield, and Odie visit Doc Boy on the farm, and Dr. Whipple puts Garfield under a spell that makes him do chores.
36b	10b	"Inside Eddie Gourmand"	Mark Evanier	March 10, 2011	July 7, 2010
After Eddie Gourmand gives a bad review about Vito's Pizzeria on TV, Garfield, Jon, and Odie find out the reason for his recent crankiness and help him.
37a	11a	"With Four You Get Pizza"	Mathilde Maraninchi & Antonin Poirée	March 9, 2011	July 2, 2010
Jon goes out on a date with Liz to Vito's Pizzeria. Since Vito has banned animals from entering the restaurant, Garfield and Odie disguise themselves as children to get inside, and Nermal and another cat named Myron do the same. Before long, Jon and Liz's date turns into disaster.
37b	11b	"Guest from Beyond"	Mark Evanier	June 13, 2011	June 30, 2010
Eddie Gourmand is fired when an ethical vegan takes over the station. Jon unwittingly takes him in, which soon turns out to be a mistake, as Gourmand devours all Jon's food.
38a	12a	"History of Cats"	Kim Campbell	March 16, 2011	June 24, 2010
Garfield tells a small yet untrue history about cats, and the mice are upset because Garfield is making it seem as though cats actually did everything in history.
38b	12b	"Dog Days"	Emmanuelle Aubert	March 8, 2011	July 6, 2010
After Odie helps their friend, Nimbus, he gives him a forever dog cookie. Odie licks Jon after eating it, and Jon starts acting like a dog. Jon licks Liz, and the condition spreads all over the city.
39a	13a	"Garfield Astray"	Original Idea: Philippe Vidal; Script: Mathilde Maraninchi & Antonin Poirée	March 14, 2011	July 5, 2010
After Garfield plays a mean trick on Nermal, a bowling ball falls on his head and he loses his memory. Then, Nermal tricks Garfield into thinking he is an alley cat named Ichabod. Garfield then meets a couple of stray cats named Tino and Gino.
39b	13b	"Master Chef"	Mark Evanier	June 13, 2011	July 2, 2010
When Garfield hears about a chef who can make "the best lasagna in the world" from Vito, he is determined to find him.
40a	14a	"Black Cat Blues"	Emmanuelle Aubert	March 16, 2011	July 6, 2010
A miserable, black cat named Jonah passes by Garfield outside, and Garfield is given a bad luck curse until he can remove the curse and bring good luck to himself.
40b	14b	"The Bluebird of Happiness"	Mark Evanier	March 10, 2011	July 7, 2010
One of the baby bluebirds from "Mother Garfield" returns and Garfield saves him from Harry. Later, though, Nermal accidentally lets Harry have the bird and Garfield, Nermal, and Odie must save it before Harry eats it.
41a	15a	"Penny Henny"	Original Idea: Jim Davis; Script: Mark Evanier	June 15, 2011	July 13, 2010
Jon tells Drusilla and Minerva the story of Penny Henny believing the sky is falling, much to Garfield's concern.
41b	15b	"Pirate Gold"	Christophe Poujol	June 17, 2011	July 15, 2010
While Jon is away, Garfield and Odie are pretending to be pirates. They pretend to be on a pirate ship, and find gold, where they find other dogs.
42a	16a	"Great Pizza Race"	Mark Evanier	March 21, 2011	July 19, 2010
Jon goes out on a date with Liz and orders Garfield a pizza for dinner from Vito's Pizzeria. Garfield races against Vito's new speedy delivery policy and torments him.
42b	16b	"Love and Lasagna"	Mathilde Maraninchi & Antonin Poirée	June 22, 2011	July 21, 2010
Real estate tycoon Brent Mogul threatens to destroy Vito's restaurant, and it is up to Garfield and Odie to stop him.
43a	17a	"Fido Food Feline"	Mark Evanier	March 11, 2011	July 12, 2010
Jon accidentally feeds Garfield Odie's dog food, and after overhearing Liz say, "you are what you eat," Garfield thinks he is a dog.
43b	17b	"Mind Over Mouse"	Mark Evanier	June 23, 2011	July 22, 2010
Squeak gains the ability to see future events, like Jon hitting his thumb with a hammer.
44a	18b	"A Gripping Tale"	Original Idea: Marek Acey; Script: Mark Evanier	June 16, 2011	July 13, 2010
A giant squid finds its way into the city sewer and sucks Odie in, and Garfield must save him.
44a	18b	"Jumbo Shrimpy"	Mark Evanier	June 17, 2011	July 14, 2010
Garfield discovers an elephant called shrimpy being mistreated by Dr. Whipple, and he and Odie help Shrimpy escape from him, when the police and al catch them, the police arrest whipple after he threatens shrimpy as mistreating animals is against the law and shrimpy stays at Jon's house with them.
45b	19a	"Everything's Relative"	Mark Evanier	March 11, 2011	July 9, 2010
Aunt Ivy's house is being rid of mice and she has to stay at Jon's home for a week. Then, Druscilla and Minerva show up, and Jon is so annoyed with them that he tries to get them to stay at Doc Boy's farm. The problem only worsens because Doc Boy refuses to put up with them, too.
45b	19b	"Stealing Home"	Dodine Herry-Grimaldi	June 21, 2011	July 20, 2010
While Jon is away, a stray cat named Bruno steals the house and Garfield and Odie need to figure it out how to get back in. This is Bruno's first appearance.
46a	20a	"Cuter Than Cute"	Mark Evanier	March 21, 2011	July 12, 2010
Nermal comes over for a visit and the space lasagnas (from "Pasta Wars" and "Blasteroid") return once again and send a spy disguised as a cute kitten over to Garfield's home. Everyone thinks he is much cuter than Nermal, and Nermal gets jealous.
46b	20b	"Pampered Pussycat"	Mark Evanier	June 24, 2011	July 23, 2010
Prince Orloff gets a lesson about having fun from Garfield and Odie.
47a	21a	"Depths of a Salesman"	Christophe Poujol & Thomas Forwood	June 14, 2011	July 8, 2010
Garfield, Jon and Odie buy items from the "All Buying Channel". When they find out the channel's service is a scam, Garfield is determined to get their money back.
47b	21b	"Detective Odie"	Baptiste Heidrich & Julien Monthiel	June 20, 2011	July 20, 2010
Odie goes on the case when Jon is mistaken as a thief for the theft of a neighbor's bracelet. Jon says that he didn't do anything, and at the end, they manage to find the real villain behind the crime and get the neighbor's bracelet back.
48a	22a	"Wicked Wishes"	Mark Evanier	June 16, 2011	July 14, 2010
Odie finds a magical bottle with a genie in it, but it wants Jon to grant the genie three wishes.
48b	22b	"Full of Beans"	Original Idea: Philippe Vidal; Script: Emmanuelle Aubert	June 21, 2011	July 19, 2010
Odie accidentally swallows a Mexican jumping bean that was given to Jon by his Mexican friend Pablo. Odie now starts jumping all around the house, and he causes trouble when he jumps out the pet door and into the city.
49a	23a	"Me, Garfield, and I"	Christophe Poujol	June 20, 2011	July 15, 2010
Garfield obtains possession of Professor Bonkers' cloning ray, and makes clones of himself so he can do what he wants.
49b	23b	"The Big Sleep"	Christophe Poujol; Thomas Forwood; Mark Evanier	June 23, 2011	July 23, 2010
Garfield tries everything he can to try to hibernate like the squirrels, but all his attempts prove futile.
50a	24a	"True Colors"	Emmanuelle Aubert	June 22, 2011	July 21, 2010
Garfield's shabby treatment of Nermal draws the ire of a television show host, Dr. Goodygood, that seeks to teach him a lesson. Dr. Goodygood takes away Garfield's colors, thus making him the same color as Nermal. Garfield has to do nice things to get them back.
50b	24b	"The Mole Express"	Emmanuelle Aubert	June 27, 2011	July 26, 2010
Garfield must help Odie's squirrel friends from moving to a new tree because of a tunnel made by a mole and at the same time to rescue his animal friends from the city pound.
51a	25a	"Rain or Shine"	Emmanuelle Aubert	June 27, 2011	July 22, 2010
Jon, in need of quality time alone with Liz on the beach, sends his pets to Aunt Ivy. Garfield's nocturnal rain wish is answered by a leprechaun. The luck-bringer, whom the pets discover, keeps forgetting to close magical tunnel doors, which allows the weather to jump continents, affecting Jon's travel plans.
51b	25b	"Parrot Blues"	Emmanuelle Aubert	June 24, 2011	July 26, 2010
Jon watches Mr. Barker's parrot, Paxton, while he is away. The grumpy Paxton ends up flying downtown, telling people things that cause all of them to burst into tears.
52	26	"Unfair Weather"	Mark Evanier	June 28, 2011	July 27, 2010
The heat is unbearable under the Arbuckle roof. In fact it's unbearable everywhere. The only person seemingly happy with the heatwave is Mr. Allwork, whose sales in air conditioning and ice cream and sunblock have gone through the roof. Unfortunately for Jon, this day is also the day he promised the twins, Drusilla and Minerva, he'd take them camping in the woods, Odie and a very relunctant Garfield are dragged along for the ride. What plans to be a miserably hot camping trip in the woods, turns out to be quite pleasant as it starts to rain. But then it starts to snow! Then to hail! Then to rain sandwiches! Something very strange is going on, and this strange weather seems to be coming from a single cloud.

=== Season 3 (2012) ===
No. overall	No. in season	Title	Written by	U.S. air date	French air date	U.S. viewers (millions)
53a	1a	"Little Angel"	Mark Evanier	September 5, 2012	July 16, 2012	N/A
A newcomer has just shown up in the neighborhood: Angel, a sweet meek homeless kitten that Jon invites home. But that Angel is an evil feline in disguise. Jon blames Garfield for eating the chocolate cake and destroying the living room (which were caused by Angel), and then he locks Garfield outside of the house. Garfield has to find a way to get rid of his now turned bad owner as soon as possible by getting rid of Angel.
53b	1b	"Double Double Trouble (Two Times the Trouble)"	Mark Evanier	October 5, 2012	July 16, 2012	0.88
When Garfield tries to escape Drusilla's and Minerva's dress-up games, more twins keep popping in! From Harry the cat down to Eddie Gourmand, they all have duplicates. Even Jon?!
54	2	"Furry Tales"	Peter Berts	September 4, 2012	December 31, 2011	N/A
55	3	"Furry Tales"	Peter Berts	September 4, 2012	December 31, 2011	N/A
Garfield reads Odie the story of a particularly handsome cat... it takes place in the Middle-Ages and Prince Jon needs to get married or the Viceroy will get to the throne and implement a tax on... anything with cheese! When Garfield tells the fairy tale of Prince Jon and Elizabeth, it's a dashing and admirable cat that will save love and the throne! Mildred the dragon joins in to fight the evil Viceroy. But a wicked witch who has made a pot of poisoned spaghetti bolognese morphs into Vito and knocks on Elizabeth's door... The heroic cat, followed by the animals of the forest, marches on the castle to rescue Jon and sends the Viceroy and his accomplices through the air. But wouldn't have Garfield made up that happy-ending story?
56a	4a	"Kind to Kittens"	Mark Evanier	September 5, 2012	July 17, 2012	N/A
Corrupt Mayor Grafton has implemented a new law: everyone has to be extra nice with cats! Robots are patrolling the city to fine unfriendly citizens! A rejoiced Garfield eventually finds out this is not so good and goes to the City Hall...
56b	4b	"Laugh in a Can"	Julien Magnat	September 7, 2012	July 17, 2012	N/A
The manager has decided on adding canned laughter to the Garfield show but Garfield disagrees and sets down to pushing the buttons and manipulating the controls in his turn...
57a	5a	"Land of Later"	Mark Evanier	September 6, 2012	July 18, 2012	N/A
When King Glorm makes everyone lazy, he ends up making Garfield energetic!
57b	5b	"The Caped Avenger Rides Again!"	Mark Evanier	September 10, 2012	July 18, 2012	N/A
A valuable copy of Ultra-Powerful Guy has just been stolen by Stealer and it's up to the Caped Avenger and Slurp to stop this new villain! Will they be able to defeat Stealer and retrieve the copy back? Find out in this epic feature episode!
58a	6a	"The Great Trade-Off"	Julien Magnat	October 5, 2012	July 19, 2012	0.88
Dr. Puzzle has invented an ingenious device to trade two people's personalities! His audience made of mad scientists is enthused. The new weapon is tested on a frog and a secret agent, on Nermal and Bruno and...on Garfield, too!
58b	6b	"Prehistoric Pup"	Mark Evanier	September 6, 2012	July 19, 2012	N/A
A meteorite crash lands and accidentally turns Odie into a giant green dog.
59a	7a	"The Superhero Apprentice"	Julien Magnat	September 10, 2012	July 20, 2012	N/A
When the Caped Avenger becomes a super-hero, Nermal becomes a new villain. What a bad pick!
59b	7b	"Teddy Dearest"	Peter Berts	September 11, 2012	July 20, 2012	N/A
Pooky or Robo-Pooky? Garfield is quite clear about it and chooses Pooky because Pooky doesn't dance or exercise. He actually doesn't do anything at all, just like him! Garfield decides to send all the Robo-Pookies back to where they were designed: Mr. Allwork's toy building.
60a	8a	"The Non-Garfield Show"	Peter Berts	September 7, 2012	July 23, 2012	N/A
A cartoon show starring a cat and a dog? Tyler Edge isn't exactly convinced by Jon's concept. He'd rather opt for a super muscular super hero half human half Garfield and get rid of...the puppy dog!
60b	8b	"What a Difference a Pet Makes"	Peter Berts	September 12, 2012	July 23, 2012	N/A
What is the difference between cats and dogs? Garfield answers his fan's question: cats are simply refined, calm and cool and dogs are not. A shocked Odie tries to prove him wrong...
61a	9a	"Bath Day"	Julien Magnat	September 11, 2012	July 24, 2012	N/A
When Nermal complains that having a bath is stiff boring, Garfield leads him -together with Odie- to a bubble ocean with sharks, flying birds and very special mermaids...
61b	9b	"Partners in Mime"	Peter Berts	September 13, 2012	July 24, 2012	N/A
When Jon trains for the World Mime Championship everything becomes imaginary, food included! Will a starving Garfield still be his partner for an amazing duet?
62a	10a	"Garfield Gets Canned"	Julien Magnat	September 12, 2012	July 25, 2012	N/A
There is no more food! A greedy ferret has just emptied the whole fridge and the kitchen cupboards. Garfield and Odie are left with a cat food can. This is bad enough but when it comes to opening it, worst comes to worst.
62b	10b	"Boris the Snowman"	Peter Berts	September 13, 2012	July 25, 2012	N/A
When snowmen are telling jokes, Garfield might eventually have fun, even in the cold mountains.
63a	11a	"Muscle Mouse"	Peter Berts	September 19, 2012	July 26, 2012	N/A
Push-ups and drills! Biff, an over-muscled mouse, is coaching Squeak's friends pretty hard. But Jon is expected any minute now and the asserting mice refuse to leave the dining room changed into a mini fitness facility. If Jon sees them, Garfield can forget about lasagna!
63b	11b	"Cupid Cat"	Peter Berts	September 20, 2012	July 26, 2012	N/A
Doc Boy decides to share his life on the farm and comes downtown to look for love. But wasn't love already over there? When Garfield uses Cupid's arrow...
64	12	"Long Lost Lyman"	Mark Evanier	September 14, 2012	August 18, 2012	N/A
65	13	"Long Lost Lyman"	Mark Evanier	September 14, 2012	August 18, 2012	N/A
Eddie Gourmand's show about lasagna or a documentary about the Zabadu? Garfield and Jon are fighting for the remote control. But the Zabadu may well hold Lyman prisoner and Lyman was Jon's best-friend plus Odie's owner. Garfield don't stand a chance! Garfield easily wins over the monster but well, that is a fantasy sequence...in real fiction, Jon is quite determined to go to Franistan and rescue his friend. While Squeak and the mice are taking care of the house, Jon, Garfield and Odie are looking for Lyman in the jungle. When all of a sudden Odie starts running down a canyon... Dirk Dinkum and his assistant want to reveal the Zabadu's secret identity and ruin Lyman's efforts to protect the animals of the jungle. But Garfield and the real Zabadu will stop them alright!
66a	14a	"The Garfield-Only Show"	Mark Evanier	September 24, 2012	July 27, 2012	0.40
All the characters are leaving the show, vexed as they are for not getting more lines. No problem! Garfield will play all of them: Odie, Jon, Minerva and Drusilla, Herman and even Nermal.
66b	14b	"Every Witch Way"	Mark Evanier	September 21, 2012	July 27, 2012	N/A
But Liz certainly doesn't wish to be turned into a mouse and her boyfriend to marry a young witch...
67a	15a	"More Than Meets the Eye"	Peter Berts	September 26, 2012	July 30, 2012	0.51
When a manipulative ghost wrecks the whole house and Jon blames him, Garfield gets revenge by transforming into an evil rage. No one will make him eat dry cat food instead of juicy lasagna. Not over his invisible body...
67b	15b	"Fast Friends"	Julien Magnat	September 26, 2012	July 30, 2012	0.51
Alert! Here comes Mrs. Ferret. She wooshes in so fast that a shaken Garfield is systematically left with an empty plate or no plate at all! He clearly has to stop her...
68a	16a	"Smartest Dog in the World"	Peter Berts	September 25, 2012	July 31, 2012	0.32
And the smartest dog in the world is... Odie! But as more and more people ask him for help, Odie starts wondering why being intelligent is more trouble than being dumb.
68b	16b	"The Mysterious Machine"	Mark Evanier	September 28, 2012	July 31, 2012	0.43
Garfield on a diet? Just you wait! Garfield's Mysterious Machine will soon make Jon, Nermal, Herman and Vito surrender.
69a	17a	"It's About Time"	Mark Evanier	September 18, 2012	August 1, 2012	N/A
The Nermal Show! Garfield has been stolen his house, his friends and his show. Will he get it all back and save his stripes?
69b	17b	"Farmer Garfield"	Peter Berts	September 25, 2012	August 1, 2012	0.32
When Garfield feeds Doc Boy's farm animals, everyone enjoys their food and no one wants to leave the house until they meet...Aunt Ivy!
70a	18a	"Fitness Crazed"	Mark Evanier	September 28, 2012	August 2, 2012	0.43
Biff won't make a sportsman out of Garfield but Garfield can certainly make a greedy idler out of Biff! But who will save the mice from Bruno's paws?
70b	18b	"My Friend, Nermal"	Mark Evanier	October 3, 2012	August 2, 2012	0.31
Garfield who has executed his Mongolian Monster Fleas Dance to save Nermal is now in great danger: Nermal wants to do him grateful favours!
71a	19a	"Filthy Fugitives"	Julien Magnat	September 24, 2012	August 3, 2012	0.40
Give them a bath! Garfield and Odie are wanted! Who will come to their rescue? Liz?
71b	19b	"Where's Odie"	Peter Berts	September 27, 2012	August 3, 2012	0.45
When Odie chases squirrels and vanishes into the forest, Sherlock-Garfield uses the Slobber Detector Solution to follow the doogy drool!
72a	20a	"Online Arbuckle"	Peter Berts	September 18, 2012	August 6, 2012	N/A
"The Arbuckle Chronicles" by Garfield! What a buz! But who could be so proud of being the biggest laughingstock? Jon? Nermal?
72b	20b	"Revenge of the Cat People"	Julien Magnat	September 21, 2012	August 6, 2012	N/A
Liz's niece is so fond of her Fuzz Button Kitty Cat! But wouldn't that actually be the terrifying Neferkitty? Garfield is on his way to save the world...again!
73a	21a	"Doggone Jon"	Mark Evanier	September 27, 2012	August 7, 2012	0.45
When Jon works as a dogcatcher, Garfield dresses up as a dog -to have him fired!- and Odie walks a dummy Jon...
73b	21b	"Pawparazzi"	Peter Berts	September 17, 2012	August 7, 2012	N/A
Garfield Cat wins Brandon Scoop's show Positively Perfect Pussycat Pageant! Er... No that's a mistake says judge Mary Margaret Freen, Nermal is the winner... No ! Cousin Coslough is the winner...
74	22	"Little Trouble in Big China"	Julien Magnat	October 2, 2012	May 28, 2012	0.33
75	23	"Little Trouble in Big China"	Julien Magnat	October 2, 2012	May 28, 2012	0.33
Garfield has been missing for 18 meals - 24 hours that is! Odie and Nermal are nowhere to be found! When Jon receives a phone call: they're in China! "Two cats and a dog involved in a wild chase last night through the streets of Shanghai!", Jon didn't except to hear about his pets even before landing... Garfield, Odie and Nermal learning martial arts? The Old Master of the Temple has never had such hopeless students but since they have that precious gift of making friends, he'll give them the other half of the long-sought medallion... Will Garfield, Odie, Nermal, Dingbang, Bella, Voldo...and Jon make it to the fabled diamond of Fucanglong guarded by a ten-foot long dragon?
76a	24a	"The Golden Lasagna Awards"	Mark Evanier	September 17, 2012	August 8, 2012	N/A
And the winner is...Garfield Cat! When Garfield wins all the Golden Lasagna awards, an outraged Nermal calls the doggy gang.
76b	24b	"The Control Freak"	Mark Evanier	September 20, 2012	August 8, 2012	N/A
A petrified Garfield witnesses the most heart-breakening scene ever: Vito stomping on full pizza boxes!
77a	25a	"Bride and Broom"	Mark Evanier	October 4, 2012	August 9, 2012	0.43
Fairy-tale addicted Winona has kidnapped Doc Boy and taken him to the Tower of Witchery to marry him! Mrs. Cauldron, who doesn't believe in handsome Princes nor in true love or fairy tales where witches always get burnt or shoved into ovens, jumps on her tricycle broom with Garfield, Odie and Gloria to stop the ceremony.
77b	25b	"The Write Stuff"	Peter Berts	September 19, 2012	August 9, 2012	N/A
Samuel W. Underburger is the new script-writer for the Garfield Show but...he refuses to waste his time writing comedies! Garfield puts up all sorts of funny scenes to prove him wrong: Underburger is so little amused that he threatens to write everyone out! Alert!
78a	26a	"Problems, Problems, Problems"	Peter Berts	October 4, 2012	August 10, 2012	0.43
Getting rid of your fleas? Of a bluebird-eating cat? Getting your lover's love back? Ask Garfield! Garfield can fix anything!
78b	26b	"Take a Ferret to Lunch"	Mark Evanier	October 3, 2012	August 10, 2012	0.31
Owner wanted for Mrs. Ferret! No one manages to keep her: she gets way too excited when it comes to food. But Garfield knows someone who sleeps most of the day and eats everything at once: Eddie Gourmand...

=== Season 4 (2015–16) ===
The fourth season was confirmed to be in production in May 2012. The season first aired in Germany from October 26, 2013 to May 1, 2014. In the United States, the season began airing on October 6, 2015, with new episodes airing on Boomerang. It also has seven five-part specials, all of which are 60 minutes.

No. overall	No. in season	Title	Written by	U.S. air date	French air date	U.S. viewers (millions)
79 81a	1 3a	"Lion Queen"	Mark Evanier	October 6, 2015 October 6, 2015 October 13, 2015 October 20, 2015 August 2, 2016	February 23, 2013	0.15 0.15 0.19 0.25 N/A
Part 1 - Zoo Melody: Liz, Jon, Odie and Garfield go to a rich man's private zoo where he imprisons rare and endangered animals. After Garfield feeds all the animals and Liz and Jon find out he is planning on capturing a manzian white lion, they go to Africa to stop him. Part 2 - Welcome to Africa: After a short reunion with Jon, Angie sets off to find her friend. Dirk Dinkum and his assistant sabotage their plane, leaving them stuck. Part 3 - Life Outside: After Garfield and Odie are chased away from the plane, they find a group of monkeys with a baboon, who take care of them by feeding them modern foods. Jon is worried about his pets. Part 4 - King of Cats: Liz overhears Dirk Dinkum firing his assistant and saying that he is going where the lion was. The monkeys and baboon introduce Garfield and Odie to the queen lion and her cubs. Dinkum then captures her, prompting the others to rescue her. Part 5 - Open the Cages: Garfield and the others make a plan to free the lion and all the other animals. The plan works when Dirk Dinkum's old assistant brings the male lion.
81b 83	3b 5	"Bewitched"	Julien Magnat	October 27, 2015 November 3, 2015 November 10, 2015 November 17, 2015 August 3, 2016	March 9, 2013	0.15 0.32 0.26 0.22 N/A
Part 1 - Familiar Familiar: Garfield meets Mrs. Cauldron's niece Abigail, who turns Odie into a bat to avoid getting in trouble at the Witchery School. Part 2 - Witches Just Wanna Have Fun: Garfield, with help from a talking book, travels to the witchery world to save Odie. Part 3 - The Heartless Witch: Abigail wishes for the book spirit to be free, and the spirit turns out to be the imprisoned Varicella (Mrs. Cauldron's sister, Abigail and Winona's aunt), who wants vengeance for being imprisoned for 1,000 years. Part 4 - The Hall of Witchdom: Garfield, along with Odie and Winona (as a frog) aid Abigail to acquire three magical items before Varicella does. Part 5 - Bewitched and Bewildered: Varicella succeeds in using the Forbidden Moon Spell, but Garfield and the others will not give up without a final showddown.
84 86a	6 8a	"The Mean Machine"	Mark Evanier	July 4, 2016 July 5, 2016 July 6, 2016 July 7, 2016 July 8, 2016	May 9, 2013	N/A
Part 1 - Too May Smartphones: An alien from Socket, a planet with advanced technology, plots to rule over Earth after seeing how people are dependent on technology. Part 2 - Men of Metal: Garfield is targeted by robots from Socket when he is seen as a threat. Part 3 - Robot Rampage: While on the run from robots, Garfield finds out that magnetics can destroy the robots. He also gains help from an unexpected ally. Part 4 - Rocket to Sprocket: When Garfield and Odie learn the aliens' story, they help them regain their freedom by going to planet Socket. Part 5 - The Robot Revolution: After they arrive in Socket, Garfield and the others prepare for the final showdown.
86b 88	8b 10	"Glitter Gulch"	Mark Evanier	July 11, 2016 July 12, 2016 July 13, 2016 July 14, 2016 July 15, 2016	March 30, 2013	N/A
Part 1 - Go West Young Cat: Nermal becomes the director of a western movie that involves a gold robbery. Part 2 - Blazing Lasagna: Nermal has trouble finding an interesting idea for the movie, while Garfield gets into an eating competition with Bruno. Part 3 - Showdown at Vito's: After the contest, Garfield gets invited to Ms. Kitty Litter's dressing room to set up a trap for Bruno. Arlene then ends up in the trap. Part 4 - Life on the Stage: Garfield manages to save Arlene while Jon is fired. During the lunch break, Nermal wants to be in the movie. Part 5 - All That Glitters…:The bad guys are on their way to Glitter Gulch when Ms. Kitty Litter tells Garfield, Jon and the others about their plan. They set out for the final confrontation, with Nermal as a late addition.
89 91a	11 13a	"Against All Tides"	Julien Magnat	July 18, 2016 July 19, 2016 July 20, 2016 July 21, 2016 July 22, 2016	May 8, 2013	N/A
Part 1 - Scallywags & Sea Scoundrels: Garfield is a ship-plundering pirate with a crew hungry for lasagna. Nermal, who is out to arrest him, ends up on a deserted island. Part 2 - Adventures on Aruba Island: Garfield and Nermal find Jon stranded on the island with them and then told them about the Horn of Plenty, which gives anyone an unlimited amount of food. After escaping from the island, they catch up with the pirates that stole the ship and crew. Part 3 - Escape After convincing Lisa, the Queen of the Pirates, to sail to a dangerous island with a missing map piece, the parrot's pirates and Nermal set a trap for them. Part 4 - Feeding the Fish: The crew is saved by a group of mermaids. They travel to an island, only to get eaten by a whale. Part 5 - Return of the Queen: The crew finds the Horn of Plenty.
91b 93	13b 15	"Lasagna Tree"	Mark Evanier	July 25, 2016 July 26, 2016 July 27, 2016 July 28, 2016 July 29, 2016	June 15, 2013	N/A
Part 1 - The Rat Pack: When Mama Meanie opens up a line of restaurants with low quality food, they manage to put small restaurants such as Vito's out of business. Part 2 - Tree's Company: After Eddie Gourmand talks about a lasagna tree in Italy, everyone heads to Italy to find it. Part 3 - Roaming About Rome: On the plane flight, Vito's girlfriend Angelica says that she thinks Mama Meanie's goons are after him. After they meet with Vito, they go where Vito's cousin lives and find out that Vito's mother is there. Part 4 - The Pasta Plant: While in the house, Mama Meanie's goons take the lasagna tree with Garfield and Odie napping in it, only to discover that it is a fake. Part 5 - The Big Broadcast: After taking the tree away, Garfield and Odie eat the lasagna off the tree. They blackmail Vito's mother into giving the recipe, and Garfield manages to broadcast the truth about his restaurant.
94 96a	16 18a	"Garfield into the Wild"	Julien Magnat	August 15, 2016 August 16, 2016 August 17, 2016 August 18, 2016 August 19, 2016	May 4, 2013	0.21 0.16 0.23 N/A N/A
Part 1 - Call of the Wild: Jon brings Garfield, Odie, Nermal and the twins to a national park; once there, the pets meet three rambunctious raccoons. Part 2 - Into the Woods: Garfield and the others are stuck in the woods after the raccoons tie them up and steal their clothes, so they call their inner animal. Part 3 - Nermal's First Kiss: Garfield, Odie and Nermal walk into the woods and follow a river. They fall down a waterfall and find a frog named Fa fan and an alligator named Monica. They trick them into making Nermal kiss Fa fan, then lead them to the desert. Part 4 - Where Eagles Don't Dare: Jon, thanks to Squeak, realizes that Garfield, Odie and Nermal were in the woods all the time. While they were in the desert, they find a bus stop, only to leave to save Odie from a big mother eagle. Part 5 - Ugly Coyotes: After Odie heard a weird sound, Clest St. Clare- the popular teen idol that the twins like- was on a road that they found and stop the limousine into a ditch and walk with her to find a group of coyotes.
96b	18b	"Double Vision"	Peter Berts	November 24, 2015	November 2, 2013	0.30
Garfield tries to profit with special glasses invented by Professor Bonkers to see the future.
97a	19a	"My Cousin Petunia"	Julien Magnat	December 1, 2015	November 9, 2013	0.27
When Garfield finds out that the twins are being bullied, he helps them by dressing up. When he shows up, the twins present him as their cousin Petunia.
97b	19b	"Barking Mad"	Julien Magnat	August 1, 2016	November 16, 2013	N/A
Garfield explains to the viewers his situation involving a special collar that is tasked with discouraging the wearer from barking.
98a	20a	"Garfception"	Samuel Barksdale	August 4, 2016	November 23, 2013	N/A
Nathan uses his Dream Machine to give Garfield nightmares.
98b	20b	"For Mice"	Mark Evanier	August 5, 2016	November 30, 2013	N/A
Two mice go inside Garfield's house to watch a television channel meant for mice.
99a	21a	"Six-Can Solution"	Mark Evanier	August 8, 2016	December 7, 2013	N/A
Squeak offers to help Garfield clear his name after being accused of eating six cat food cans per day.
99b	21b	"Silence of the Sheep"	Julien Magnat	August 9, 2016	December 14, 2013	N/A
When Garfield has trouble falling asleep, sheep from the sandman's plane arrive. When they fail, he fires them. The sheep try to put everyone to sleep to prove themselves.
100a	22a	"Bulldog of Doom"	Samuel Barksdale	August 10, 2016	December 21, 2013	N/A
Garfield wants a pie on a window that is protected by the owner's bulldog.
100b	22b	"Mother Owl"	Samuel Barksdale	August 11, 2016	December 28, 2013	N/A
Jon and Liz go bird watching and leave Garfield and Odie two things to eat; after Garfield eats both, it became hard to find more food. Garfield is then mistaken for an owl's child.
101a	23a	"Home Sweet Home"	Mark Evanier	August 22, 2016	January 4, 2014	N/A
Garfield, Jon, and Odie are entered into a contest to see who can stay in the house for a week.
101b	23b	"Whatever Happened to Aunt Ivy?"	Julien Magnat	August 23, 2016	January 11, 2014	N/A
Jon gets hurt, so Aunt Ivy comes over to stay.
102a	24a	"Delicious Donut Day"	Samuel Barksdale	August 24, 2016	January 18, 2014	N/A
Jon gets a box of donuts, and Garfield tries different ways to get them.
102b	24b	"Little Miss Mouse"	Mark Evanier	August 25, 2016	January 25, 2014	N/A
Garfield stays up all night watching movies and wants to go to sleep, but Mary Margaret (Squeak's niece) is late to Squeak's hike. Garfield plays game with her until Bruno captures her.
103a	25a	"Stink, Stank, Skunk!"	Julien Magnat	August 26, 2016	February 1, 2014	N/A
Garfield gets painted to look like a skunk, thinking that it will make life easier for him.
103b	25b	"Jon 2"	Julien Magnat	August 29, 2016	February 8, 2014	N/A
When Jon leaves the house, Garfield is happy while Odie misses Jon, so Garfield makes a second Jon to keep Odie happy.
104a	26a	"My Dog, the Cat"	Mark Evanier	August 30, 2016	February 15, 2014	N/A
Garfield tricks a dog who complains about everything into learning how to be a cat.
104b	26b	"World Without Me"	Mark Evanier	August 31, 2016	February 22, 2014	N/A
A depressed Garfield wants to be in a world where he never existed. Paddy the leprechaun shows him such a world and Garfield finds out he is indeed important.
105a	27a	"Fraidy Cat"	Mark Evanier	September 1, 2016	March 1, 2014	N/A
Doctor Whipple uses a machine to zap Garfield into being scared of everything about cats. Now Garfield is afraid of Harry, Arlene, and even Nermal, causing Nermal to attempt to blackmail Garfield.
105b	27b	"The Very, Very Long Night"	Mark Evanier	September 2, 2016	March 8, 2014	N/A
After Jon leaves to pick up Eddie, Garfield, Odie and the twins watch a scary movie that Jon said not to watch which causes the four to fear there is a monster around.

=== Season 5: Rodent Rebellion (2016) ===
No. overall	No. in season	Title	Written by	U.S. air date	French air date	US viewers (millions)
106	1	"Rodent Rebellion"	Mark Evanier (story), & Julien Magnat (dialogue)	October 24, 2016	April 27, 2015	0.07
107	2	"Rodent Rebellion"	Mark Evanier (story), & Julien Magnat (dialogue)	October 24, 2016	April 27, 2015	0.07
Jon is framed for a series of robberies perpetuated by the villainous rat named Ratzo. Garfield, Odie, and Squeak must get to the bottom of this mystery to prove that he is innocent.
