= Garfield Originals =

- Genre: Comedy; Slapstick
- Created by: Philippe Vidal; Jim Davis
- Based on: Garfield by Jim Davis
- Developed by: Philippe Vidal; Jim Davis
- Directed by: Philippe Vidal
- Voices of: Véronique Soufflet; Antoine Schoumsky; Gérard Surugue; Bruno Choël
- Countries of origin: France; United States
- Original languages: French; English
- No. of seasons: 1
- No. of episodes: 24

Production
- Executive producers: Maïa Tubiana; Jim Davis
- Running time: 3 minutes
- Production companies: Dargaud Media; Paws, Inc.

Original release
- Network: France 3 (France); Nick.com (United States); YouTube (international)
- Release: December 6, 2019 – June 17, 2020

Related
- Garfield and Friends; The Garfield Show; Garfield

Garfield Originals is a 2D animated short series created by Jim Davis and Philippe Vidal. The series premiered in France on December 6, 2019, on France 3 and Okoo; it is also available on France.tv (a streaming platform available only in France). Half of the show's episodes aired on December 6, 2019; the remaining half aired on June 17, 2020. The series also aired on Radio-Canada on May 11, 2021. On October 19, 2021, the series was added to Nick.com in the United States as well as being uploaded to YouTube by the official channel of The Garfield Show. Unlike most incarnations in the Garfield franchise, Garfield Originals relies on physical comedy and is inspired by silent films. It is also the first installment in the franchise since the final episode of Garfield and Friends in 1994 to utilize traditional animation.

The series was developed with France's Dargaud Media and Ellipsanime.

== Characters ==
- Garfield
- Jon Arbuckle
- Odie
- Nermal
- Dr. Liz Wilson
- Arlene
- Pooky
- Squeak (Mouse)
- Big Dog
- Herman Post (Mailman)

== Voice cast ==
- Gérard Surugue as Garfield
- Véronique Soufflet as Nermal, Arlene and Liz Wilson
- Antoine Schoumsky as Odie, Squeak, Big Dog and Herman Post
- Bruno Choël as Jon Arbuckle (uncredited)

== Structure ==
It is composed of 120 shorts of thirty seconds. One segment contains 5 shorts that make up 24 segments.

== Production ==
MadLab Animations, created by Ankama Animations and Ellipsanime Productions, is the animation studio for the series.

== Episodes ==
No.	Title French title bottom	Original France Air Date
1	"Burping Madness" "Rototos !"	December 6, 2019
Short 1 (The King of Burp): Garfield does a burp for hours by drinking a bottle of soda in front of Jon, and later drinks a larger one. Short 2: Jon and Garfield repeatedly fight over a can of soda for burping, until Squeak drinks it all and burps loudly. Short 3: Odie plays a tune on the piano and Garfield burps the Blue Danube tune as a successful talent. The song ends with arm farts. Short 4: While eating cat food with Arlene, Garfield burps thrice, but fills the gas in the paper lunch bag. Arlene opens the bag and hears a loud burp. Short 5: When they're eating, Garfield, Odie and Jon notices themselves doing a burping sympathy. Then, mice and spiders come to applaud the three.
2	"Can't Sleep!" "Insomnies !"	December 6, 2019
Short 1: Garfield struggles to close a blind for him to sleep due to the lightning. Short 2: Squeak wakes up Garfield during a nap with a guitar and two amplifiers. Squeak uses the guitar again to ease Garfield back asleep, only for him to frighten Garfield and shatter the screen. Short 3: Garfield gets constantly irritated by the telephone. He maims the telephone, only for his alarm clock to ring. Short 4: After throwing away an alarm clock, Odie fetches the clock back. This happens three times, with Garfield throwing the clock in Odie's mouth the third time. Short 5: A spider tickles Garfield in his sleep. When Garfield flings it away, the spider grabs his friends to trap Garfield in a web.
3	"Meal Time!" "À table !"	December 6, 2019
Short 1: Garfield uses four mice to distract Jon from his food in order to eat it. Short 2: Garfield, Odie, and Jon challenge who can eat the most peppers. When Garfield sneaks the entire contents of the bowl into Jon's sandwich, the spiciness causes Jon to burn Garfield and Odie. Short 3: Jon tries to defend his food from Garfield and Odie. He tries to eat a donut after Garfield and Odie chow down his meal, only for the two to attempt to eat his donut. Short 4: Garfield and Jon play with vegetables to make funny faces. When a scary creature (who turns out to be Odie) shows up, they run in fear. Short 5: Odie makes an enormous mess while eating his dog food, ruining Garfield and Jon's dinner.
4	"Tricking Nermal" "Gare à Nermal !"	December 6, 2019
Short 1: Garfield pranks Nermal with a cardboard cutout of him. When Nermal arrives at it, she starts crashing cymbals hardly to wake him. Short 2: Nermal tries to bomb Garfield, but backfires when a mirror distracts him and the bomb blows up on him instead. Short 3: Nermal uses a fishing rod to steal Pooky out the window. Short 4: Nermal finds an empty cat bed, which is a trap Garfield set to send him to Abu Dhabi. Short 5: Garfield hogs a mirror. When Nermal tries to get it, he hits his head and Garfield shows him the injury.
5	"Pet Door" "La porte !"	December 6, 2019
Short 1: Jon comes up with the idea of letting his pets through the pet door. This backfires when an excessive amount of pets enter the door. Short 2: Garfield and Odie fight with the pet door. When Odie lifts the door up, Garfield crashes into the wall. Short 3: Garfield fights Odie to use the pet door, and vice versa. This baffles Jon when the two walk connected with the door. Short 4: Jon tries to enter through the pet door. When he gets stuck, his pets give him makeup and the mailman falls in love with Jon. Short 5: Garfield gets stuck in the door. When Odie helps him, he goes through, only to be elongated.
6	"Pumpkin Trouble" "Citrouille et trouille !"	December 6, 2019
Short 1: Garfield marks a face in a pumpkin, but when he attempts to carve it, the pumpkin comes to life and runs away scared. Short 2: Garfield attempts to scare Odie using a carved pumpkin on his head, which somehow scares Jon instead. Short 3: When Nermal scares Garfield with a spider decoy, he tries to scare him back by coloring Nermal's nose red and showing it in the mirror. Short 4: As Garfield tries to grow a pumpkin, Odie urinates on the seed, causing it grow into a beanstalk, with a pumpkin falling on Garfield's head. Short 5: Garfield plants a pumpkin seed and blocks it from Nermal to see. When he finally gets a chance, the pumpkin quickly grows, launching him away.
7	"Treadmill Trouble" "Cardio panique"	December 6, 2019
Short 1: Odie rubs off his treadmill skills to Garfield but when he tries, he crashes through the wall. Short 2: Garfield tries to sleep on the treadmill but it repeatedly turns on automatically whenever he does. Short 3: Garfield attempts to use the treadmill, but it goes too fast and crashes him through the wall. Short 4: Garfield (holding Pookie), three mice, and Odie attempt to use the treadmill one by one, but each of them crash into the wall, collapsing it. Jon also tries to use the treadmill but then destroys the house. Short 5: As food is served, Garfield tries to leave the treadmill, but it turns on as he runs, with Odie eating both of their food.
8	"Waking Jon!" "Réveil !"	December 6, 2019
Short 1: Garfield tries to wake up Jon to get fed during midnight but instead moves his bed out of the room. Short 2: Garfield wants to sit on the sofa, but Jon is sleeping on it. He wakes him up using the radio. Short 3: Odie tries to wake up Jon so he can take him for a walk and licks his foot to do so. Short 4: Garfield and Odie try to wake up Jon for food. Short 5: Garfield tries to prank Jon with a ghost disguise, waking him up with horror.
9	"Mice Phobia" "Sourisphobic !"	December 6, 2019
Short 1: Garfield gets Squeak to scare Jon out of his chair by placing cheese next to him. Short 2: Jon freaks out and starts acting crazy when he spots Squeak roaming the living room. Short 3: Jon gets suspicious when Squeak orders his fellow mice to collect food. Short 4: When Jon spots Squeak, he launches very high from his chair. Short 5: Garfield tries to distract Jon with Squeak in order to get his coffee.
10	"Chair Mayhem" "C'est mon fauteuil !"	December 6, 2019
Short 1: Garfield is unable to watch his favorite show when Odie keeps drooling on him. Short 2: Odie scares Garfield with a spider decoy but ends up getting scared himself. Short 3: Garfield watches his favorite show but Jon and Odie also want to watch, kicking him out of his sofa. Short 4: In an attempt to sit in the sofa, Garfield scares Jon with Squeak, but Jon screams too loud, destroying everything in the house. Short 5: Garfield sits in the sofa but when Jon also sits in it, Garfield tricks him into leaving.
11	"Sweet Arlene" "Douce Arlène"	December 6, 2019
Short 1: Arlene lures Garfield with a donut in an attempt to get him to dance with her. Short 2: When a big vicious dog bullies Garfield, Arlene stands up for him by beating the dog up. Short 3: Garfield tricks Arlene into hugging him so he can eat her food when she's not looking. Short 4: Garfield holds the pet door for Arlene, only to walk away and leave her in the house. Short 5: Garfield treats Arlene to a special dinner behind a fruit market.
12	"Up a Tree" "Chat perché !"	December 6, 2019
Short 1: When Garfield tries climbing up a tree, the branches keep falling. Short 2: Nermal makes Garfield a cake while he's hanging on top of a tree branch, but when he tries to get it, he falls to the ground. Short 3: Odie somehow manages to reach the tree branch through invisible stairs, but this doesn't work for Garfield. Short 4: Unable to climb on top of the tree, Garfield uses a cannon to launch himself on a branch, but gets himself stuck on it. Short 5: Odie shows off his impressive tricks while hanging on a branch while Garfield uses his tongue to repel him down, though has to deal with Odie and a branch falling on him.
13	"Did You Say Cake?" "Ga-Gâteau !"	June 17, 2020
Short 1: When Odie eats Garfield's cake, he is forced to retrieve it through his mouth. Short 2: When Garfield steals Jon's cake, he finds himself being chased by him and Odie for it. Short 3: Garfield tries to blow the candles from a cake, only to discover that it was a trick set up by Nermal. Short 4: When Garfield sees Jon walking with a cake, he gobbles it all up, in the process of tearing up Jon's clothes. Short 5: Jon tries to hide a cake from Garfield but is too late when the latter and Odie start chasing him for it.
14	"Mosquito" "Moustic et tac !"	June 17, 2020
15	"Mind the Vet!" "Attention véto !"	June 17, 2020
16	"Big Dog" "Bon chienchien !"	June 17, 2020
17	"Spider Wars" "Ahhhhhraignées !"	June 17, 2020
18	"Donuts Mania" "Baba de beignets !"	June 17, 2020
19	"Beach Boogie" "Coquillages et crustacés"	June 17, 2020
20	"Mailman!" "Voilà le courrier !"	June 17, 2020
21	"Sleepwalk!" "Somnambul-ouille"	June 17, 2020
22	"Scratching!" "Grat-grat !"	June 17, 2020
23	"Bouncing Ball" "Baballe"	June 17, 2020
24	"Pookie Time" "Pookie"	June 17, 2020
