= Power of Love (Charley Pride album) =

Studio album by Charley Pride
- Released: 1984
- Genre: Country
- Length: 27:56
- Label: RCA
- Producer: Norro Wilson

Charley Pride chronology
Night Games (1984)	Power of Love (1984)	Greatest Hits, Volume 2 (1985)

Professional ratings
Review scores
Source	Rating
AllMusic	2.5/5 stars

Power of Love is a studio album by American country music artist Charley Pride, released in 1984 via RCA Records. The album includes the hit single "The Power of Love".

== Track listing ==
No.	Title	Writer(s)	Length
1.	"The Power of Love"	Gary Nicholson, Don Cook	3:31
2.	"Everybody's Lookin' for You"	Don Pfrimmer, Bill Shore, Byron Gallimore	2:54
3.	"Missin' Mississippi"	Blake Mevis, Shore, Gallimore	2:49
4.	"Ellie"	Mevis, Shore, Gallimore	2:40
5.	"Falling in Love Again"	Susanna Clark	3:06
6.	"Stagger Lee"	Harold Logan, Lloyd Price	2:42
7.	"Gotta See Some More of You"	Shore, Gallimore	3:09
8.	"I Only Miss You on Weak Days"	John Schweers, Mack David	3:13
9.	"Girl Trouble"	Bobby David, Ray Kennedy	2:50
10.	"Some Days It Rains All Night Long"	Ed Penney	3:02

== Chart performance ==
Chart (1984)	Peak position
US Top Country Albums (Billboard)	49
