= Julien Magnat =

French film director

Julien Magnat is a French filmmaker and television screenwriter and director. He is best known for Bloody Mallory (2002) and Faces In The Crowd (2010).

== Life and career ==
Magnat was born in Ardèche, France. He earned an international baccalaureate at UWC Atlantic College in Wales and a degree in Film, Theatre and Television at the University of Reading in England. Magnat often cites Diamanda Galas and Stephen King as some of his main influences growing up. Magnat's first film, Shalt Thou Shew Wonders to the Dead, was based on King's short story Nona.

In 1996, Magnat joined France’s prestigious national film school, La FEMIS. Several of his short films including Varnish Dreams, Vena Cava and The All New Adventures of Chastity Blade have screened at Major Film Festivals such as Larissa Mediterranean Festival of New Filmmakers, St Petersburg International Film Festival, Cineteca Bologna Film Festival, Gerardmer's Fantastic'Arts, Mamers en Mars and the CST selection at the Cannes Festival.

Magnat won the Special Jury Award at the International Film School Festival in Poland and an Academy Award nomination for his student film The All-New Adventures of Chastity Blade in 2001.

In 2002, Magnat's low budget feature debut Bloody Mallory starring Olivia Bonamy and Valentina Vargas was theatrically released in various countries including France, Spain and Japan and screened at international Film Festivals including London Frightfest, Sitgès International Film Fest in Spain, Reel Affirmations International Gay and Lesbian Film Festival, Munich Fantasy Filmfest and Tokyo International Fantastic Film Festival. Bloody Mallory was subsequently picked up for distribution in the US by Lion’s Gate.

In 2010, Magnat helmed his first North American feature both as a writer / director with Faces in The Crowd, a psychological thriller starring Milla Jovovich, Julian McMahon and Marianne Faithfull. The 11 million dollar movie, slated for a late 2011 release, was co-produced by Jean Charles Levy and Clement Miserez along with US producers Sylvain White and Scott Mednick.

Although best known for his work as a director, Julien Magnat has penned more than 50 different screenplays for various TV series including Le Petit Prince: Voyages Extraordinaires, Time Jam: Valerian & Laureline, Skyland, Pop Secrets. Magnat's episode of Le Petit Prince: Voyages Extraordinaires, La Planete De L'oiseau De Feu was picked as an official Selection at the 2011 Annecy International Animated Film Festival.

Magnat penned five episodes of Marvel's Iron Man: Armored Adventures that debuted in the USA on the Nicktoons Network on April 24, 2009. Magnat is also one of the main screenwriters on The Garfield Show, which premiered in France on France 3 in 2008 and in the U.S. on Cartoon Network in 2009.

As a writer, Julien Magnat made regular contributions in the French cinema magazine L'Écran Fantastique and Vacarme.
