= Night Games (album) =

Studio album by Charley Pride
- Released: August 1983
- Genre: Country
- Length: 31:38
- Label: RCA
- Producer: Norro Wilson

Charley Pride chronology
| Country Classics (1983) | Night Games (1983) | Power of Love (1984) |

Professional ratings
Review scores
| Source | Rating |
|---|---|
| AllMusic | 2/5 stars |

Night Games is a studio album by American country music artist Charley Pride, released in August 1983 on RCA Records. It includes the singles "Night Games" and "Ev'ry Heart Should Have One". "Night Games" reached No. 1 on the Hot Country Songs chart.

== Track listing ==
| No. | Title | Writer(s) | Length |
|---|---|---|---|
| 1. | "Draw the Line" | Jerry Fuller | 3:20 |
| 2. | "Love on a Blue Rainy Day" | Kent Robbins, Richard E. Carpenter | 3:34 |
| 3. | "The Late Show" | Mickey Reed, Mike Jones | 2:49 |
| 4. | "Night Games" | Blake Mevis, Norro Wilson | 2:42 |
| 5. | "Down in Louisiana" | Keith Stegall, Jim McBride | 2:07 |
| 6. | "Ev'ry Heart Should Have One" | Bill Shore, Byron Gallimore | 2:54 |
| 7. | "Thanks for Wakin' Me Up This Mornin'" | Shelley Pinz | 2:55 |
| 8. | "Lovin' It Up (Livin' It Down)" | Shore, Gallimore, David Wills | 2:48 |
| 9. | "Just Can't Leave That Woman Alone" | Wayland Holyfield, McBride | 3:08 |
| 10. | "I Could Let Her Get Close to Me (But She Could Never Get Close to You)" | Shore, Mevis, Wills | 3:20 |

== Chart performance ==
| Chart (1983) | Peak position |
|---|---|
| US Top Country Albums (Billboard) | 20 |
