= Bloody Mallory =

- Directed by: Julien Magnat
- Written by: Julien Magnat; Stéphane Kazandjian
- Produced by: Marc Missonnier; Olivier Delbosc; Éric Jehelmann
- Starring: Olivia Bonamy; Adrià Collado; Jeffrey Ribier
- Cinematography: Richard Mercier
- Edited by: Jean-Denis Buré
- Music by: Kenji Kawaï
- Distributed by: Mars Distribution
- Release date: 17 July 2002 (France)
- Running time: 94 minutes
- Countries: France; Spain
- Language: French

Bloody Mallory is a 2002 film directed by Julien Magnat at his directorial debut, and written by Magnat and Stéphane Kazandjian. The film stars Olivia Bonamy, Adrià Collado, Jeffrey Ribier, Laurent Spielvogel, Valentina Vargas, Julien Boisselier, and Thylda Barès. The film's score was composed by Kenji Kawai.

The film itself is a mix of horror, action, and comedy in a style highly reminiscent of American television shows such as Buffy the Vampire Slayer and Xena: Warrior Princess.

== Plot ==
Mallory (Bonamy) is the head of an elite government-run strike force dedicated to combating the supernatural. Her team includes the drag queen Vena Cava (Ribier), an explosives expert; a mute, pre-teen telepath capable of possessing others named Talking Tina (Barès); and an armed governmental agent named Durand (Perkins-Lyautey). They are dispatched to protect a convent from an assault by a pack of undead monsters when they are attacked by an unknown assailant. The battle leaves Durand dead, Vena Cava injured, and Tina in a coma. Simultaneously, the newly elected pope (Spielvogel) is kidnapped by strange, masked attackers who resist the bullets of the pope's bodyguards. Mallory is approached to rescue the pope, a job she reluctantly accepts when she realizes there may be a connection between her team's assailant and the pope's kidnappers.

Tracking the kidnappers to a pocket dimension containing an entire village that had vanished off the map several years earlier, Mallory and her team are joined by Père Carras (Collado), a priest trained in the martial arts and one of the bodyguards present at the time of the pope's kidnapping. Their search for the pope eventually leads to Lady Valentine (Vargas), a centuries-old vampire who survived being beheaded during the French Revolution, and her mission to summon Abaddon, a fallen angel that will cover the world in darkness.

== Casting ==
According to interviews present on the Region 1 DVD, Valentina Vargas was reluctant to appear in the film, but strong campaigning by director Magnat convinced her to sign on.

== Release ==
Bloody Mallory was released in France on 17 July 2002. It was released in the United States in the second quarter of 2004.

== Influence and references ==
Magnat has admitted to being highly influenced by the visual style and hyper-reality of anime and manga. This influence is most apparent during the final scenes of the first battle of the film between Mallory and the undead attacking the church.

Mallory's appearance, especially her bright red hair and revealing uniform, is highly reminiscent of the main character in the film Run Lola Run. Her black leather pants, red vinyl top, hair length, style and color, fighting style and overall appearance and attitude and connexion with the occult are highly reminiscent of the video game and film character Bloodrayne.

The Necronomicon, a work featured in the horror fiction of H. P. Lovecraft, is referenced several times as if it were a legal document, including the citing of paragraphs and sub-sections relating to the conditions of summoning a demon.

A vindictive living doll from a 1963 episode of the Twilight Zone is called Talky Tina.
