= Country Classics (Charley Pride album) =

Studio album by Charley Pride
- Released: March 1983
- Genre: Country
- Length: 26:59
- Label: RCA
- Producer: Norro Wilson

Charley Pride chronology
Charley Pride Live (1982)	Country Classics (1983)	Night Games (1983)

Country Classics is the thirtieth studio album by American country music artist Charley Pride. It was released in March 1983 via RCA Records. The album includes the single "More and More".

== Track listing ==
No.	Title	Writer(s)	Length
1.	"More and More"	Merle Kilgore, Webb Pierce	2:16
2.	"In the Jailhouse Now"	Jimmie Rodgers	3:04
3.	"Burning Bridges"	Walter Scott	2:51
4.	"Tennessee Saturday Night"	Billy Hughes	2:41
5.	"Radio Heroes"	John Schweers	3:03
6.	"Wondering"	Joe Werner	3:03
7.	"That's How Much I Love You"	Eddy Arnold, Graydon Hall, Wally Fowler	2:36
8.	"Filipino Baby"	Bill Cox, Clark Van Ness	3:43
9.	"Why Baby Why"	George Jones, Darrell Edwards	2:06
10.	"Up to My Heart in Memories"	Schweers	2:36

== Chart performance ==
Chart (1983)	Peak position
US Top Country Albums (Billboard)	36
