= The Power of Love (Charley Pride song) =

Single by Charley Pride

from the album Power of Love
- B-side: "Ellie"
- Released: May 1984
- Genre: Country
- Length: 3:33
- Label: RCA
- Songwriters: Don Cook; Gary Nicholson
- Producer: Norro Wilson

Charley Pride singles chronology
"Ev'ry Heart Should Have One" (1983)	"The Power of Love" (1984)	"Missin' Mississippi" (1984)

"The Power of Love" is a song written by Gary Nicholson and Don Cook, and recorded by American country music artist Charley Pride. It was released in May 1984 as the first single from his album Power of Love. The song peaked at number 9 on the Billboard Hot Country Singles chart.

== Chart performance ==
Chart (1984)	Peak position
US Hot Country Songs (Billboard)	9
Canadian RPM Country Tracks	11

== Lee Roy Parnell version ==
"The Power of Love"

Single by Lee Roy Parnell

from the album On the Road
- B-side: "Straight and Narrow"
- Released: October 1, 1994
- Genre: Country
- Length: 3:39
- Label: Arista Nashville
- Songwriters: Don Cook; Gary Nicholson
- Producer: Scott Hendricks

Lee Roy Parnell singles chronology
"Take These Chains from My Heart" (1994)	"The Power of Love" (1994)	"A Little Bit of You" (1995)

"The Power of Love" was covered by American country music artist Lee Roy Parnell and released as the fourth single from his album, On the Road, in October 1994. Parnell's version peaked at number 51 on the Billboard Hot Country Singles chart.

=== Chart performance ===
Chart (1994)	Peak position
Canada Country Singles (RPM)	64
US Hot Country Songs (Billboard)	51
