= Down on the Farm (Charley Pride song) =

Single by Charley Pride

from the album Greatest Hits, Volume 2
- B-side: "Now and Then"
- Released: January 1985
- Recorded: November 1984
- Studio: Music City Music Hall (Nashville, Tennessee)
- Genre: Country; Countrypolitan
- Length: 3:43
- Label: RCA Victor
- Songwriters: Eddie Setser; John Greenebaum; Troy Seals
- Producer: Blake Mevis

Charley Pride singles chronology
"Missin' Mississippi" (1984)	"Down on the Farm" (1985)	"Let a Little Love Come In" (1985)

"Down on the Farm" is a song written by Eddie Setser, John Greenebaum and Troy Seals, and recorded by American country music artist Charley Pride. It was released in January 1985 as the first single from his Greatest Hits, Volume 2 compilation album. The song became a top 40 hit on the Billboard country chart.

== Background and content ==
Charley Pride's sound and style began to transition more towards country pop rather than the traditional country of his earlier years. This style continued into the early 1980s while he was still on RCA Records. This sound was also exemplified on "Down on the Farm," which was composed by John Greenebaum, Eddie Sester and Troy Seals. The song was recorded in November 1984 at Music City Hall, a studio located in Nashville, Tennessee. The session was produced by Blake Mevis, whom had previously composed material that Pride recorded. Additionally, the song "Now and Then" was recorded during the same studio session.

== Release and reception ==
"Down on the Farm" was released as a single via RCA Victor Records in January 1985. The song spent 13 weeks on the Billboard Hot Country Songs chart and peaked at number 25 on the list in June 1985. It was Pride's second single in over a decade to miss the country top ten. His previous release, "Missin' Mississippi," also missed the country top ten. The song also became a top 40 hit on the Canadian RPM Country Singles chart when it peaked at number 33 in 1985. It was later released on Pride's 1985 compilation record entitled Greatest Hits Vol. 2.

== Track listings ==
7" vinyl single

- "Down on the Farm" – 3:43
- "Now and Then" – 2:55

== Chart performance ==
Chart (1985)	Peak position
Canada Country Songs (RPM)	33
US Hot Country Songs (Billboard)	25
