= The Garfield Show =

Animated television series

- Garfield & Cie
- Genre: Comedy; Slapstick
- Created by: Jim Davis
- Based on: Garfield by Jim Davis
- Developed by: Philippe Vidal; Robert Rea; Steve Balissat
- Directed by: Philippe Vidal
- Voices of: Frank Welker; Gregg Berger; Wally Wingert; Jason Marsden; Audrey Wasilewski; Julie Payne
- Composers: Laurent Bertaud; Jean-Christophe Prudhomme
- Countries of origin: France; United States
- Original languages: English; French
- No. of seasons: 5
- No. of episodes: 107 (214 segments) (list of episodes)

Production
- Executive producers: Jim Davis; Robert Rea; Maia Tubiana
- Producers: Kim Campbell; Marie-Pierre Moulinjeune; Steve Balissat; Caroline Duvochel
- Running time: 23 minutes (11 minutes per segment; most episodes); 47–59 minutes (11 episodes) (Note: "Furry Tales", "Long Lost Lyman", "Little Trouble in Big China", "Lion Queen", "Bewitched", "The Mean Machine", "Glitter Gulch", "Against All Tides", "Lasagna Tree", "Garfield Into the Wild" and "Rodent Rebellion")
- Production companies: Dargaud Media; Paws, Inc.

Original release
- Network: France 3 (France); Cartoon Network (U.S., seasons 1–3); Boomerang (U.S., seasons 4–5)
- Release: 2 November 2009 – 24 October 2016

Related
- Garfield and Friends; Garfield Originals; Garfield

The Garfield Show (French: Garfield & Cie, lit. 'Garfield & Co.') is an animated television series produced by French animation production company Dargaud Media and Paws, Inc. It is based on the American Garfield comic strip created by Jim Davis. The animated series focuses on a new series of adventures for the characters of Garfield, Odie, and their owner Jon Arbuckle, alongside staple characters from the strip and a number of unique additions for the program. Both Davis and producer Mark Evanier, who previously wrote episodes for the 1988 original cartoon animated series Garfield and Friends, co-wrote stories for the program, with the cast including Frank Welker as the title character alongside Wally Wingert, Julie Payne, Jason Marsden, and Gregg Berger. Welker, Payne and Berger had previously voiced various characters in Garfield and Friends.

The animated series premiered on 22 December 2008 in France as Garfield & Cie, in early 2009 in Japan as Gāfīrudo to shī, and on 2 November 2009 in the United States. It ran for five seasons, with its last episodes airing in France on April 27, 2015 and in the US on October 24, 2016; Evanier stated shortly afterward that it was on hiatus. On August 6, 2019, a Nickelodeon series based on the Garfield comic strip was announced to be in the works, seemingly ending any chances of The Garfield Show coming back. On March 6, 2026, it was announced that the series, titled Garfield, is set to be released on Paramount+ on December 11 of the same year.

== Plot ==
The show features loose continuity and is set in Muncie, Indiana the same setting as the previous Garfield cartoon series Garfield and Friends but in a different neighborhood, which is occasionally referenced. Liz is a main character and is in a relationship with Jon, reflecting their status in the comic strip. Arlene is established as Garfield's potential love interest. Garfield talks with mouth movement, although usually only other animals are able to understand him.

Many new characters are part of the regular cast, including Vito, an Italian chef and restaurant owner, and Harry, a stray cat, both a friend and a nemesis to Garfield. Squeak, Garfield's mouse friend that lives in Jon's house, appears with many relatives.

== Episodes ==
Series	Episodes	Originally released		
Series	Episodes	First released	Last released	Network
1	26	2 November 2009	23 December 2009	Cartoon Network
2	26	13 December 2010	28 June 2011	Cartoon Network
3	26	4 September 2012	5 October 2012	Cartoon Network
4	27	6 October 2015	2 September 2016	Boomerang
5	2	24 October 2016		Boomerang

Cartoon Network premiered the series from November 2, 2009, to October 5, 2012. After that, the channel occasionally aired exclusively reruns until May 23, 2014. It premiered on Boomerang on February 4, 2013.

== Cast and characters ==
=== Main characters ===
- Garfield (voiced by Frank Welker) is a lazy and sarcastic but good-hearted, lasagna-loving orange tabby cat and the protagonist of the show.
- Odie (voiced by Gregg Berger) is a fun-loving, dopey brown-and-yellow beagle dog and Garfield's best friend.
- Jon Arbuckle (voiced by Wally Wingert) is Garfield and Odie's dorky owner who is employed as a cartoonist.
- Nermal (voiced by Jason Marsden) is a mischievous and highly egotistical grey tabby cat with a cute appearance. He is Garfield's frenemy and often visits the latter's house.
- Dr. Liz Wilson (voiced by Julie Payne) is the local veterinarian and Jon's love interest.
- Squeak (voiced by Gregg Berger) is a good-natured and loyal house mouse and one of Garfield's closest friends. He and his friends and family regularly invade Jon's kitchen.

=== Recurring characters ===
- Arlene (voiced by Audrey Wasilewski) is a kind yet snarky pink-tinted, short-haired Turkish Angora cat who serves as Garfield's love interest.
- Eddie Gourmand (voiced by Frank Welker) is a famous food critic whose opinions on restaurants usually have a major impact on their success. He often crosses paths with Garfield, as they are both overweight, fun-loving and enjoy Vito's cooking.
- Harry (voiced by Gregg Berger) is a stray cat who lives in Garfield's neighborhood. He is a friend and occasional rival of Garfield, serving as an anti-hero.
- Dr. Whipple (voiced by Stan Freberg) is an antagonist in the series who, while helping others, is usually out for his own gain. He is a parody of Dr. Phil.
- Professor Thaddeus Bonkers (Note: Harlow Cranfranz in "Curse of the Were-Dog") (voiced by Jason Marsden) is a mad scientist whose discoveries tend to lead to disaster.
- Doc "Doc Boy" Arbuckle (voiced by David Lander) is Jon's workaholic younger brother who owns a farm. Jon always teases him by calling him "Doc Boy", much to his irritation.
- Aunt Ivy (voiced by Laraine Newman) is Jon and Doc Boy's bossy aunt who often harasses Jon whenever she comes to visit.
- Vito Cappelletti (voiced by Jason Marsden) is an Italian chef who owns Vito's Pizzeria. Garfield admires him for his amazing cooking and often frequents his restaurant.
- Drusilla and Minerva (voiced by Laura Summer) are two hyperactive and playful twins that like to dress up any animal they come across, often Garfield. They are hinted to be either Jon's cousins or nieces.
- Herman Post (voiced by Gregg Berger) is the mailman that works in Garfield's neighborhood. Garfield often plays pranks on him for "delivering nothing but bills", much to his dismay. He regularly earns salary raises, as the other mailmen are too scared of Garfield to permanently replace him.
- Al and Pete (voiced by Wally Wingert and Jason Marsden, respectively) are clumsy dog catchers who are often fired for their incompetence, only to be rehired for lack of suitable replacements.
- Mama Meany (voiced by Gregg Berger) is the greedy owner of a pizza place that rivals Vito's. He usually resorts to underhanded tactics to make money, since the food he sells is barely edible and tastes terrible.
- Bruno (voiced by Wally Wingert) is a sadistic alley cat that bullies Garfield.
- The Evil Space Lasagnas are an alien race of living lasagnas that try to conquer Earth. Their former leader is King Parma, until Garfield sent him flying in "Cuter Than Cute", and was replaced by the Lasagnas' greatest warrior, Spumoni.
- Hercules (voiced by Wally Wingert, Jason Marsden in "Bone Diggers") is a mean chihuahua with a bad attitude who is actually a troubled loner deep on the inside. He sometimes associates with Mademoiselle Fifi, the chihuahua belonging to Jon's boss.
- Mr. Barker (voiced by Gregg Berger) is Jon's kind but demanding former boss who commissions Jon's comics.
- Anthony Allwork (voiced by Jack Riley) is a lawyer and businessman who acts as an antagonist. He usually tries to come up with schemes to make himself richer. He has a soft spot for his son Jack.
- Esmeralda Brubaker (voiced by Tress MacNeille) is a museum curator who prioritizes science over any person's individual life. She'll stop at nothing to get what she wants and usually finds a way to do so legally.
- Neferkitty (voiced by Susan Silo) is the leader of an ancient tribe of cats that once tried to take over the world and were banished to another dimension. Garfield tricks her into entering the human world alone, where she is forcibly adopted by Liz's sweet and caring niece Heather, who renames her "Fuzzbutton", much to her chagrin. Since then, she has sworn vengeance on Garfield and Odie.
- Nathan (voiced by Melissa Disney (season 1) and Grey DeLisle (seasons 2-4)) is a evil kid who wants to take over the world,usually by building inventions, but is always foiled by Garfield. He lives with his mother.

=== Additional characters ===
- News Anchorwoman, Winona, Angelica, Bella Bellissima, Tyham, Aunt Esther, Queen Tania, and Abigail, voiced by Laraine Newman
- Celeste, Chester, Lester, Mary Margaret Mouse, and Squirrel #2, voiced by Candi Milo
- Buckley, General Gorgonzola, and Jim Davis, voiced by Gregg Berger
- Fluffykins, Hippo, Mole, and Spencer Spendington voiced by Stan Freberg
- Mr. Arbuckle, Nimbus, Ricotta, Spumoni, Percy, Paddy, Lucky, Catzilla, Animal Scale, Cleaning Robot, Scale, Dr. Somnambulo, Mr. Sellers, Freddy Applegate, Nick, Petey #2, Man #1, Blue Alien, Green Alien, Emperor Kaal'zone, T3000, Geno, Chucky Ducky, Pablo, Mr. Schnitzel, Monster Rubber Duck, Boris the Snowman, Sam, Caveman, Slam, Voldo, and Secret Agent, voiced by Frank Welker
- Charley, Irv, and The Lasagna King, voiced by Wally Wingert
- Humphrey, Gnarley, and Mr. Wilson, voiced by Jason Marsden
- Brandon Scoop, King Glorm, and Tyler Edge, voiced by Neil Ross
- Biff and Dirk Dinkum, voiced by Fred Tatasciore
- Gloria and Newscaster, voiced by Audrey Wasilewski
- Mrs. Arbuckle and Mrs. Wilson, voiced by Julie Payne
- Jack Allwork and Sandra, voiced by Grey DeLisle
- Farley and The Sandman, voiced by Joe Alaskey
- Angie and Scheherazade, voiced by Misty Lee
- Hostess and Squirrel #1, voiced by Tress MacNeille
- Heather Wilson, Lucerita, Tabitha, Spring, Summer, Autumn, and Gloria, voiced by Laura Summer
- Armstrong, voiced by Phil LaMarr
- Mrs. Cauldron, voiced by June Foray
- Cousin Ratzo, voiced by Corey Burton
- Ghost Cat, voiced by Jack Riley
- Ms. Gourmand, voiced by April Winchell
- Health Inspector, voiced by Bob Bergen
- Hiram "Hi" Pressure, voiced by Marvin Kaplan
- Lyman, voiced by Frank Ferrante
- Master Control, voiced by Mark Hamill
- Mayor Graffton, voiced by Chuck McCann
- Metalla, voiced by Susan Silo
- McCuckoo, voiced by Bill Farmer
- Officer Reed, voiced by Jewel Shepard
- Samuel W. Underberger, voiced by Maurice LaMarche
- Varicella, voiced by Rose Marie

== Development ==
Development for The Garfield Show began in 2007 to coincide with the strip's 30th anniversary, when Dargaud Marina the French animation unit of French publishing house that released Garfield in France, Dargaud, had announced a CGI-animated series based on the comic strip series entitled The Garfield Show with Dargaud Media's CEO & managing director and founder of Dargaud Media's fellow studio Ellipsanime Productions, Robert Réa, would serve as executive producer for the then-upcoming series, while Mediatoon would handle distribution. Many crew members from the previous animated series based on Garfield that debuted in 1988 returned to work on The Garfield Show.

=== Animation ===
The animation for the series was handled by Dargaud Media's in-house animation development studio and later Ellipse Films in France and at Dargaud Media's fellow Belgian animation production studio DreamWall for season 1. When the series was renewed for seasons 2 and 3, animation production was transferred to Singaporan animation entertainment company Infinite Frameworks (who had co-handled animation services on Contraptus and Chicken Town produced by Dargaud Media's fellow production studio Ellipsanime Productions in which DreamWall had involvement), whilst Tunisia VFX & animation studio CGS Real Dream Studio co-handled animation services for the series' third season.

== Broadcast ==
The series premiered in France on France 3 on 22 December 2008 and in Japan on NHK in early 2009.

The series also airing on Gulli since 25 October 2021 in France

English-language episodes started airing on Boomerang in the UK on 5 May 2009, and in the Middle East, Africa and Central and Eastern Europe on 7 November 2009.

It aired on YTV in Canada from 13 September 2009 to 30 December 2011.

In the United States, it aired on Cartoon Network from November 2, 2009 to May 23, 2014. It also aired on Boomerang from February 4, 2013 to December 30, 2016.

In Bangladesh, the series aired on Duronto TV from 12 January 2020.

In Sri Lanka, the show has been showed multiple times over the years by Sirasa TV, dubbed in Sinhalese under the name "ද ගාර්ෆීල්ඩ් ෂෝ", lit. 'The Garfield Show'. The same show has been shown by the English-language sister channel of Sirasa TV, TV1 in English with Sinhalese subtitles. The Sinhalese-dubbed 'The Garfield Show' has gained wide momentum over the years, and is widely regarded as a popular cartoon across Sri Lankan households.

== Home media ==
The Garfield Show home video releases
Season	Title	Episode count	Release dates	Episodes
Season	Title	Episode count	Region 1 Vivendi releases	Episodes
1	Odie Oh!	6	October 5, 2010	9, 20a, 21a, 22a, 25a
1	All You Need is Love (and Pasta)	6	January 4, 2011	1b, 6b, 10a, 11b, 14b, 26a
1	Private-Eye Ventures	6	April 12, 2011	1a, 2b, 4b, 11a, 13a, 15a
1	Spooky Tails	6	August 23, 2011	2a, 3b, 15b, 17b, 18a, 24b
1	Dinosaurs & Other Animal Adventures	6	January 10, 2012	3a, 12, 14a, 16a, 21b
1	Summer Adventures	7	May 29, 2012	5b, 10b, 17a, 18b, 19a, 22b, 24a
1	It's Showtime!	6	February 18, 2014	8a, 4a, 6a, 7, 13b
1	Best Friends Forever	6	July 29, 2014	5a, 16b, 23, 25a, 26b
1	Holiday Extravaganza	5	September 4, 2012	8b, 20b, 27, 32
2	Holiday Extravaganza	5	September 4, 2012	8b, 20b, 27, 32
2	Spring Fun Collection	6	February 19, 2013	30b, 24a, 36a, 47a, 50b, 51b
2	Pizza Dreams	6	June 25, 2013	28b, 31a, 37a, 40b, 41a, 48a
2	A Purr-Fect Life!	6	October 22, 2013	29a, 31b, 38b, 39, 50a
2	Techno Cat	7	November 4, 2014	33a, 38a, 42, 43a, 48b, 49a

== Reception ==
Common Sense Media gave the show 3 stars out of 5, saying "Infamous cat's antics are fun, if not exactly message laden."

Kevin Carr of 7M Pictures gave the show 2 stars out of 5 stating that the animation felt unpolished compared to the direct-to-video movies and that the show was full of "throwaway stories" because it "aims for a more kid-friendly presentation of the fat feline." He concluded his review stating he preferred "old-school cell animation as the week-to-week series CGI looks too much like cheap video game emulations, but I'm not the target market of these things".

Justin Felix of DVD Talk gave the show 2.5 out of 5 stating that "The Garfield Show isn't some great work of art, but it efficiently delivers cartoon animal fun that little kids would probably enjoy. The animation is a tad rudimentary and clunky at times, but it's good enough to pass muster for cartoon fare of this type."

Mike Gencarelli of Media Mikes gave the show 3.5 out of 5 stating "it doesn't compare to the classic Jim Davis cartoon but it is all we have right now."

== Video game ==
The Garfield Show: Threat of the Space Lasagna
- Developer: EKO Software
- Publishers: EKO Software (EU); Zoo Games (US)
- Platforms: Wii, Microsoft Windows
- Release: Wii: EU: June 23, 2010; NA: July 8, 2010; Microsoft Windows: RU: December 2011
- Genre: Party

The Garfield Show: Threat of the Space Lasagna, a party video game, was released in July 2010 for the Wii. A PC port was released in 2011 exclusively in Russia (under title Шоу кота Гарфилда: Вторжение инопланетных лазаньяков). It includes over 12 minigames and supports the Wii Balance Board and Wii Motion Plus. The game was critically panned for its short length, lack of interactivity and monotonous gameplay.

== See also ==
- List of French animated television series
- List of French television series
- Garfield and Friends
- Garfield Originals
- Garfield
