= Down on the Farm (1939 TV series) =

1939 British TV series

- Country of origin: United Kingdom

Original release
- Release: 1939

Down on the Farm is a British television series which aired in 1939 on the BBC. The series featured A. G. Street, and was about work on the farm. The series aired monthly, and likely ended due to the suspension of the BBC television service on 1 September 1939.

None of the episodes still exist, as they aired live, and methods used to record live television were not developed until late 1947, and were used very rarely by the BBC until around 1953–1955.
