= Missin' Mississippi =

Single by Charley Pride

from the album Power of Love
- B-side: "Falling in Love Again"
- Released: September 1984
- Recorded: April 1984
- Studio: Music City Music Hall (Nashville, Tennessee)
- Genre: Country; Countrypolitan
- Length: 2:49
- Label: RCA Victor
- Songwriter(s): Byron Gallimore; Blake Mevis; Bill Shore
- Producer(s): Norro Wilson

Charley Pride singles chronology
| "The Power of Love" (1984) | "Missin' Mississippi" (1984) | "Down on the Farm" (1985) |

"Missin' Mississippi" is a song written by Byron Gallimore, Blake Mevis and Bill Shore, and recorded by American country music artist Charley Pride. It was released in September 1984 as the third single from the album Power of Love. The song became a top 40 hit on the Billboard country chart.

== Background and content ==
Charley Pride's sound a style began to transition more towards country pop rather than the traditional country of his earlier years. This style continued into the early 1980s. "Missin' Mississippi" was a country pop song composed by Byron Gallimore, Blake Mevis and Ben Shore. The song was recorded in April 1984 at Music City Hall, a studio located in Nashville, Tennessee. The session was produced by Norro Wilson, who worked with Pride during his final years at RCA Records.

== Release and reception ==
"Did You Think to Pray" was released as a single via RCA Victor Records in September 1984. The song spent 13 weeks on the Billboard Hot Country Songs chart and peaked at number 32 on the list in April 1971. It was later released on Pride's 1984 studio album (also on RCA) titled Power of Love.

== Track listings ==
7" vinyl single

- "Do You Think to Pray" – 2:49
- "Falling in Love Again" – 3:06

== Chart performance ==
| Chart (1984) | Peak position |
|---|---|
| US Hot Country Songs (Billboard) | 32 |
