= Ev'ry Heart Should Have One =

Single by Charley Pride

from the album Night Games
- B-side: "Lovin' It Up (Livin' It Down)"
- Released: September 1983
- Genre: Country
- Length: 2:53
- Label: RCA
- Songwriters: Bill Shore, Byron Gallimore
- Producer: Norro Wilson

Charley Pride singles chronology
"Night Games" (1983)	"Ev'ry Heart Should Have One" (1983)	"The Power of Love" (1984)

"Ev'ry Heart Should Have One" is a song written by Bill Shore and Byron Gallimore, and recorded by American country music artist Charley Pride. It was released in September 1983 as the second single from his album Night Games. The song peaked at number 2 on the Billboard Hot Country Singles chart.

== Music video ==
A video was produced for the song and was directed by Robert Small.

== Chart performance ==
Chart (1983–1984)	Peak position
US Hot Country Songs (Billboard)	2
Canadian RPM Country Tracks	7

== See also ==
- Charley Pride
