= Night Games (Charley Pride song) =

Single by Charley Pride

from the album Night Games
- B-side: "I Could Let Her Get Close to Me"
- Released: May 1983
- Genre: Country
- Length: 2:44
- Label: RCA
- Songwriter(s): Blake Mevis; Norro Wilson
- Producer(s): Norro Wilson

Charley Pride singles chronology
"More and More" (1983)	"Night Games" (1983)	"Ev'ry Heart Should Have One" (1983)

"Night Games" is a song written by Blake Mevis and Norro Wilson, and recorded by American country music artist Charley Pride. It was released in May 1983 as the first single and title track from the album Night Games. Pride's 29th and final number one hit on the Billboard country music charts, the single peaked at number one for one week and spent a total of 13 weeks on the country chart. It was the last country song by a solo black artist to reach number one on the country charts until "Don't Think I Don't Think About It" by Darius Rucker achieved the feat in 2008.

== Charts ==
=== Weekly charts ===
Chart (1983)	Peak position
US Hot Country Songs (Billboard)	1
Canadian RPM Country Tracks	1

=== Year-end charts ===
Chart (1983)	Position
US Hot Country Songs (Billboard)	10
