= Jim Davis (cartoonist) =

American cartoonist (born 1945)

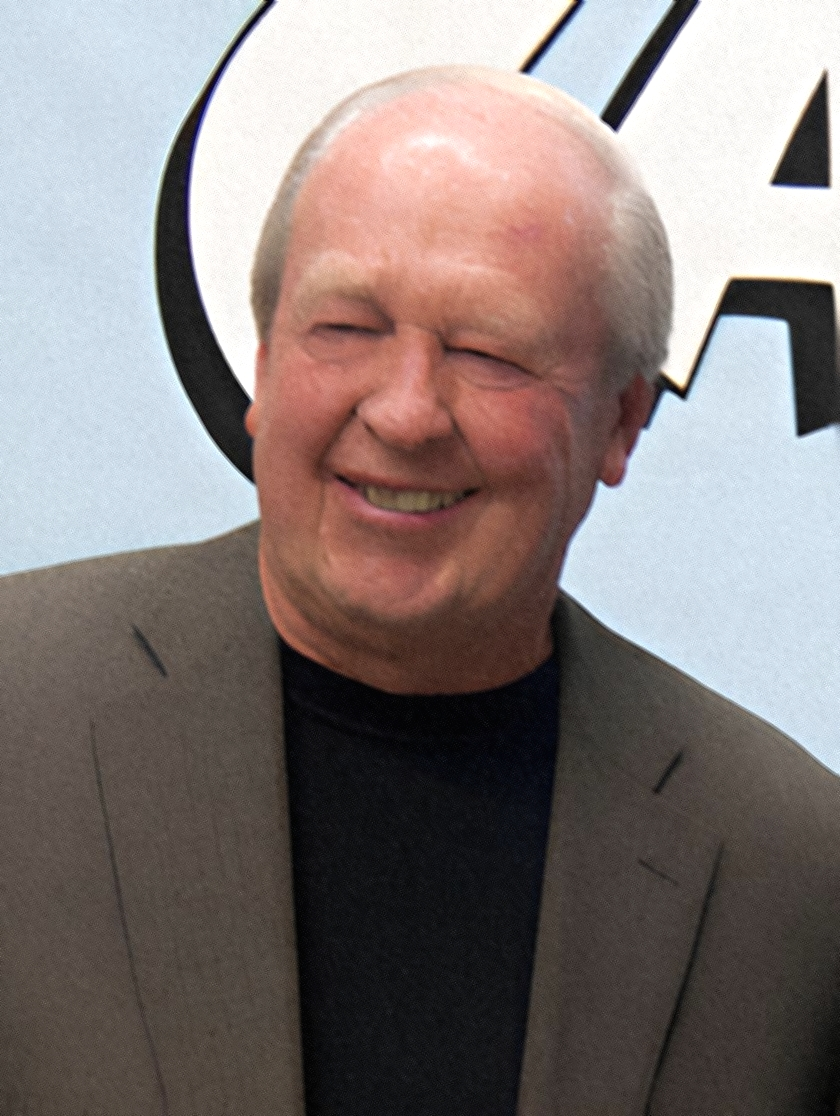
- Davis in 2010
- Born: James Robert Davis; July 28, 1945 (age 81); Marion, Indiana, U.S.
- Education: Ball State University (BA)
- Occupations: Cartoonist; television writer; television producer; screenwriter; film producer
- Years active: 1969–present
- Notable work: Garfield; (1978–present); U.S. Acres; (1986–1989)
- Spouses: Carolyn Lou Altekruse (m. 1969, divorced); Jill Carol Hahn (m. 2000)
- Children: 3 (Note: Including two stepchildren.)

James Robert Davis (born July 28, 1945) is an American cartoonist, screenwriter, and producer. He is the creator of the comic strips Garfield and U.S. Acres. Published since 1978, Garfield is one of the world's most widely syndicated comic strips. Davis's other comics work includes T.K. Ryan's Tumbleweeds, Gnorm Gnat, and Mr. Potato Head.

Davis wrote or co-wrote all of the Garfield TV specials for CBS, originally broadcast between 1982 and 1991. He also worked on Garfield and Friends as an executive producer. Davis was the writer and executive producer for a series of CGI direct-to-video feature films about Garfield, as well as an executive producer for the The Garfield Show and Garfield Originals.

== Early and personal life ==
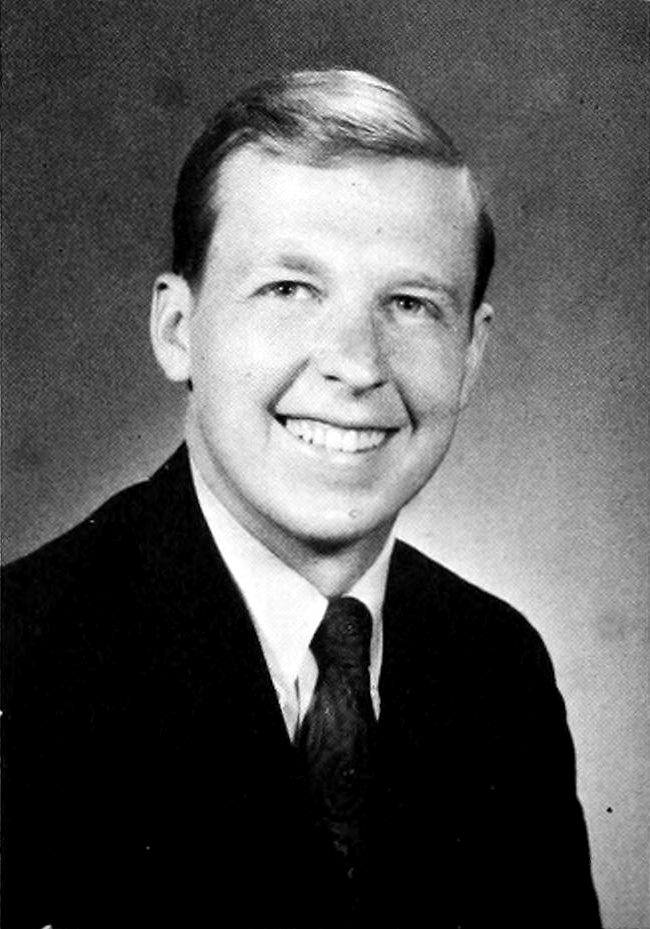
Davis's 1967 yearbook portrait from Ball State

James Robert Davis was born in Marion, Indiana, on July 28, 1945. He grew up on a small Black Angus cattle farm in Fairmount, Indiana, with his father James William Davis, mother Anna Catherine "Betty" Davis (née Carter), and his brother David. Davis's childhood on a farm parallels the life of Garfield's owner, Jon Arbuckle, who was also raised on a farm with his parents and a brother, Doc Boy, and is also a cartoonist whose birthday is on July 28. Davis attended Ball State University where he studied art and business; one of his fellow students was David Letterman. At Ball State he became a member of the Theta Xi fraternity.

At Fairmount High School in 1959, Davis joined the staff of his school's newspaper The Breeze, where he became the art editor. It was here that his first comic was featured, apparently inspired by school life. Davis also drew the majority of the illustrations for his 1963 senior yearbook, using the same characters.

Davis has been married twice. His first wife was Carolyn Lou Altekruse, whom he married in July 1969. The couple owned a dog named Molly. They have a son, Alexander. Davis's second and current wife is Jill Carol Hahn, who worked at his company, Paws, Inc., as a vice president; they were married on July 16, 2000. As a result, Davis became the stepfather of two additional children, Ashley and Christopher.

Davis joined the faculty of Ball State University in Muncie as an adjunct professor in fall 2006, lecturing on the creative and business aspects of the comics industry.

Davis resides in Albany, Indiana, where he and his staff produce Garfield under Paws, Inc., which he founded in 1981. Paws, Inc. employs nearly 50 artists and licensing administrators, who manage Garfield's worldwide licensing, syndication, and entertainment empire.

Davis is a former president of the Fairmount, Indiana chapter of the FFA.

In December 2019, Davis announced that he would hold weekly auctions for all hand-painted Garfield comics made from 1978 to 2011. He explained that he started drawing comics digitally using a graphics tablet in 2011. Older comics remained sealed in a climate-controlled safe, and Davis had to figure out what to do with them.

== Career ==
Before creating Garfield, Davis worked for an advertising agency. In 1969, he began assisting Tom Ryan on Tumbleweeds. He then created his own comic strip, Gnorm Gnat, that ran weekly from 1973 to 1975 in The Pendleton Times. When Davis tried to sell it to a national comic strip syndicate, an editor told him: "Your art is good, your 'gags' are 'great', but bugs—nobody can relate to bugs!" He then began studying the comic strips; still believing that animals were funny, he noticed in Peanuts that Snoopy was not only a scene stealer but was a far greater marketing success than Charlie Brown. Believing that the comic market was oversaturated with dogs, he decided instead to create a cat as a main character for his next strip.

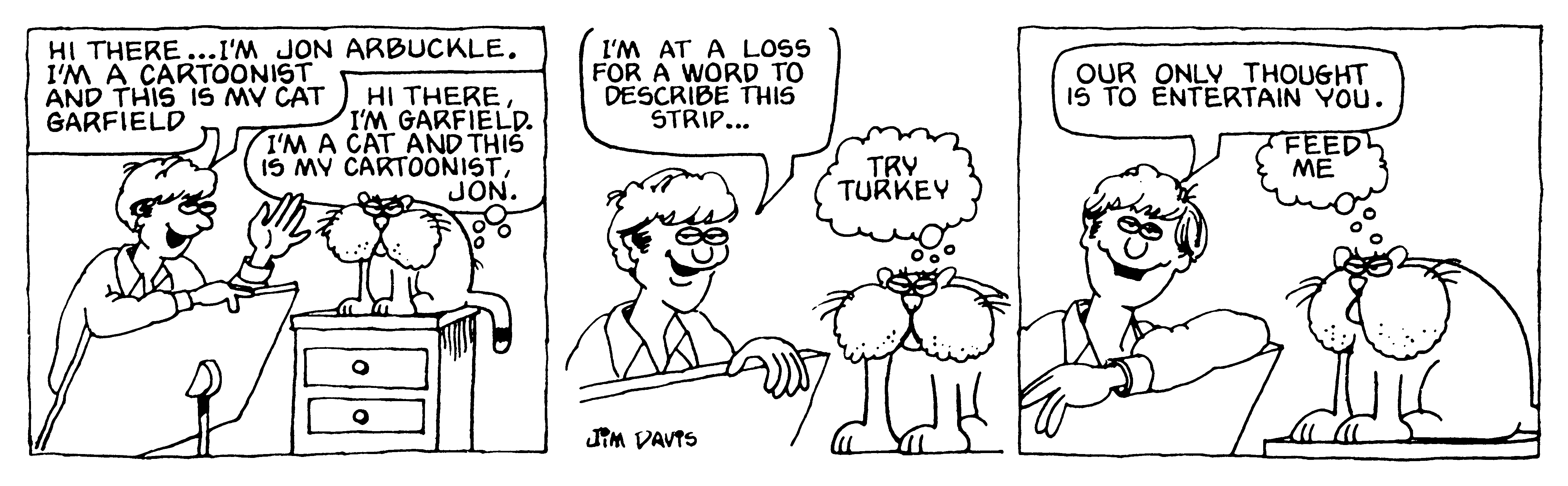
The first Jon strip, which ran in the Pendleton Times on January 8, 1976

From January 1976 to February 1978, Davis published a weekly strip titled Jon in The Pendleton Times, starring the young bachelor Jon Arbuckle and his lethargic, cynical housecat Garfield; the latter's increasing popularity among both editors and readers led Davis to rename the strip Garfield on September 1, 1977. Garfield began syndication in 41 newspapers on June 19, 1978. As of 2008, it appeared in 2,580 newspapers and was read by 300 million readers every day.

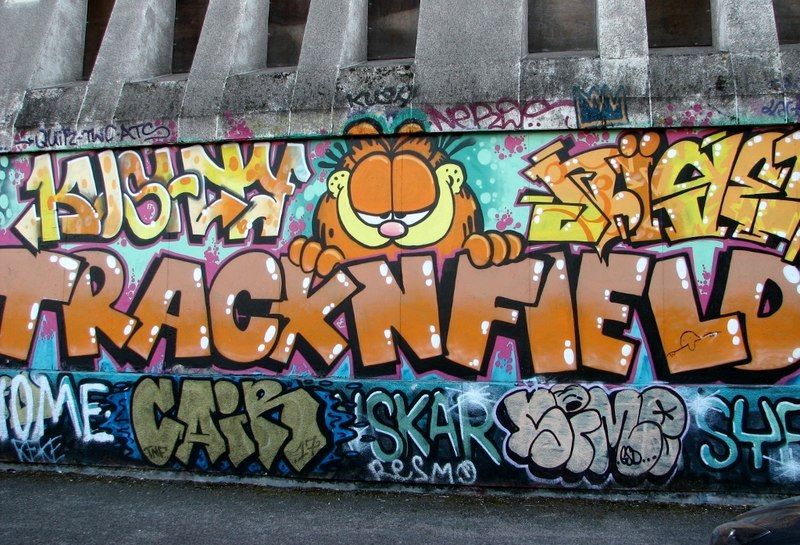
Jim Davis' Garfield appearing in this graffiti

In March 1986, Davis launched the barnyard comic strip U.S. Acres, known outside the U.S. as Orson's Farm. It failed to match the success of Garfield, and was concluded on May 1, 1989; Davis' assistant Brett Koth was credited as a co-artist during its final year. From 2000 to 2003, Davis and Koth created a strip based on the Mr. Potato Head toy.

Davis founded the Professor Garfield Foundation to support children's literacy.

His influences include Mort Walker's Beetle Bailey and Hi and Lois, Charles M. Schulz's Peanuts, Milton Caniff's Steve Canyon and Johnny Hart's B.C. Schulz became a valuable mentor to Davis; Davis credited Schulz with redesigning Garfield to his modern, bipedal form to allow him to perform physical gags, while the two were working on television specials featuring their respective strips in the early 1980s. Davis dispelled a claim by David Michaelis that Schulz held any ill will toward Davis in the wake of Garfield's success.

From 1984 to 2001, Davis owned a fine-dining restaurant in Muncie called Foxfires. He closed it after its head chef was hired elsewhere.

In 2019, Davis sold Paws, Inc. to the mass media conglomerate Viacom, which months later merged with CBS Corporation to form ViacomCBS (then Paramount Global, later Paramount Skydance and now Skydance Corporation).

== Awards ==
Year	Award	Presenting organization and sciences
1983	Golden Plate Award	American Academy of Achievement
1984–85	Emmy Award, Outstanding Animated Program, Garfield in the Rough, TV special, CBS	Academy of Television Arts & Sciences
1985	Elzie Segar Award for Contributions to Cartooning	National Cartoonist Society
1986	Outstanding Animated Program, Garfield's Halloween Adventure, TV special, CBS	Academy of Television Arts & Sciences
1986	Best Strip	National Cartoonist Society
1988–89	Emmy Award, Outstanding Animated Program, Garfield's Babes and Bullets, TV special, CBS	Academy of Television Arts & Sciences
1988	Sagamore of the Wabash	State of Indiana
1989	Reuben Award for Overall Excellence in Cartooning	National Cartoonist Society
1989	Indiana Arbor Day Spokesman Award (presented to Jim Davis and Garfield)	Indiana Division of Natural Resources and Forestry
1990	Good Steward Award (presented to Jim Davis and Garfield)	National Arbor Day Foundation
1991	Indiana Journalism Award (presented to Jim Davis and Garfield)	Ball State University Department of Journalism
1992	Distinguished Hoosier	State of Indiana
1995	Project Award	National Arbor Day Foundation
1997	LVA Leadership Award (presented to Paws)	Literacy Volunteers of America
2016	Inkpot Award (presented to Jim Davis)	San Diego Comic-Con
