= List of animated feature films of 1990 =

This is a list of animated feature films first released in 1990.

== List ==
Title	Country	Director	Production company	Animation technique	Format	Notes	Release date	Duration
The Adventures of Lotty 로티의 모험 (Loti-ui moheom)	South Korea	Song Jeong-lyul	Hotel Lotte Co., Ltd.	Traditional	Theatrical		December 29, 1990	80 minutes
The Amazing Adventures of the Teddy Bears; Niezwykle przygody pluszowych misiów	Poland	Eugeniusz Ignaciuk; Jadwiga Kudrzycka; Tadeusz Wilkosz	Se-ma-for	Stop motion	Theatrical; Compilation film	Compilation film of episodes 14—26 of the animated television series Trzy misie (Three Teddy Bears) that ran from 1984 to 1986 for a total of 26 half-hour episodes.	December 31, 1990	72 minutes
Aries: Shinwa no Seiza Miya アリーズ〜神話の星座宮〜 (Aries: The Palace of the Mythical Constellation)	Japan	Mitsuo Kusakabe	Studio Sign; Akita Publishing; POLARIS; Teichiku Entertainment	Traditional	Direct-to-video; OVA		October 1, 1990	45 minutes
Go! Anpanman: Baikinman's Counterattack ja:それいけ!アンパンマン ばいきんまんの逆襲	Japan	Akinori Nagaoka	Anpanman Production Committee; TMS Entertainment	Traditional	Theatrical		July 14, 1990	70 minutes
Black Bento まっ黒なおべんとう (Makkuro na Obentō)	Japan	Tetsu Dezaki	Kyodo Eiga	Traditional	Theatrical		June 12, 1990	50 minutes
Carol: A Day in a Girl's Life キャロル (Kyaroru)	Japan	Tetsu Dezaki; Tsuneo Tominaga	Magic Bus; Animate Film	Traditional	Direct-to-video; OVA		March 21, 1990	60 minutes
Chibi Maruko-chan ちびまる子ちゃん	Japan	Yumiko Suda; Tsutomu Shibayama	Nippon Animation	Traditional	Theatrical		December 15, 1990	94 minutes
City Hunter: Bay City Wars シティーハンター ベイシティウォーズ	Japan	Kenji Kodama	Sunrise	Traditional	Theatrical		August 25, 1990	45 minutes
City Hunter: Million Dollar Conspiracy シティーハンター 百万ドルの陰謀 (City Hunter: Hyakuman Dollar no Inbou)	Japan	Kenji Kodama	Sunrise	Traditional	Theatrical		August 25, 1990	43 minutes
The Curse of Kazuo Umezu 楳図かずおの呪い (Umezu Kazuo no Noroi)	Japan	Naoko Omi	Takahashi Studio	Traditional	Direct-to-video; OVA		March 1, 1990	43 minutes
Desperta Ferro	Spain; Germany	Jordi Amorós	Equip Produccions S. A.	Traditional	Theatrical		December 1990	75 minutes
Doraemon: Nobita and the Animal Planet ドラえもん のび太とアニマル惑星 (Doraemon Nobita to Animaru Puranetto)	Japan	Tsutomu Shibayama	Asatsu; Shin-Ei Animation; Toho (distributor)	Traditional	Theatrical		March 10, 1990	100 minutes
Dragon and Slippers; Sárkány és papucs	United States; United Kingdom; Hungary	Tibor Hernádi	Fred Wolf Films; Pannónia Filmstúdió; Magyar Televízió	Traditional	Television film		December 20, 1990	72 minutes
Dragon Ball Z: Bardock – The Father of Goku ドラゴンボールゼット たったひとりの最終決戦〜フリーザに挑んだゼット戦士 孫悟空の父〜 (Doragon Bōru Zetto: Tatta Hitori no Saishū Kessen ~Furīza ni Idonda Zetto-senshi Son Gokū no Chichi~)	Japan	Mitsuo Hashimoto	Toei Animation; Fuji TV	Traditional	Television special	First Dragon Ball Z television special; broadcast between episodes 63 ("Time Tricks and Body Binds") and 64 ("No Refuge From Recoome").	October 17, 1990	48 minutes
Dragon Ball Z: The Tree of Might ドラゴンボールゼット 地球まるごと超決戦 (Doragon Bōru Zetto: Chikyū Marugoto Chōkessen)	Japan	Daisuke Nishio	Toei Animation	Traditional	Theatrical		July 7, 1990	65 minutes
Dragon Ball Z: The World's Strongest ドラゴンボールZ この世で一番強いヤツ (Doragon Bōru Zetto: Kono Yo de Ichiban Tsuyoi Yatsu)	Japan	Daisuke Nishio	Toei Animation	Traditional	Theatrical		March 10, 1990	58 minutes
DuckTales the Movie: Treasure of the Lost Lamp	United States	Bob Hathcock	Walt Disney Pictures; Disney MovieToons; Walt Disney Animation France	Traditional	Theatrical	First Disney animated feature outside of the main canon; Based on the television series DuckTales (1987–1990) and the last Disney theatrical animated feature to use traditional cel animation.	August 3, 1990	74 minutes
"Eiji" 「エイジ」	Japan	Mizuho Nishikubo	I.G Tatsunoko; Production I.G; Animate Film; MOVIC; Pony Canyon; Shueisha; Toho	Traditional	Theatrical		August 25, 1990	45 minutes
Feluś the Duck; Kaczorek Feluś	Poland	Wadim Berestowski	Se-ma-for	Stop motion	Theatrical; Compilation film	Originally produced from 1984 to 1985 as a seven episode television series titled Leśne skrzaty i kaczorek Feluś (The Forest Dwarfs and the Duck Feluś).	December 31, 1990	67 minutes
Flight of the White Wolf 走れ！白いオオカミ (Hashire! Shiroi Ōkami)	Japan	Yosei Maeda	Group TAC; Toho (distributor)	Traditional	Theatrical		April 28, 1990	82 minutes
The Fool of the World and the Flying Ship	United Kingdom	Francis Vose	Cosgrove Hall Films	Stop motion	Television film			60 minutes
From Tale to Tale; От сказки к сказке (Ot skazki k skazkye)	Soviet Union	A.Goncharova	Soyuzmultfilm	Traditional		The remounted full-length program of animated films – fairy tales of last years (generally the Aleksandra Snezhko-Blotskaya's): "The Verlioka", "The amber lock", "The lock", "The daughter of the sun".		
Gdleen ガデュリン	Japan	Takao Kato; Toyoo Ashida	Ashi Productions; Seta Corporation	Traditional	Direct-to-video; OVA		March 1, 1990	45 minutes
Goofy's Guide to Success	United States	Zilla Clinton	Walt Disney Productions (archive footage); Robert Heath Inc. Walt Disney Television	Traditional	Television special Compilation film	Compilation of Disney theatrical animated shorts that involve work; Bill Farmer provided new redubbed lines for Goofy in the special.	November 18, 1990	87 minutes
Gude Crest – The Emblem of Gude 女戦士エフェ＆ジーラ グーデの紋章 (Onna Senshi Efe & Jīra: Gūde no Monshō)	Japan	Kazuhito Kikuchi	J.C.Staff	Traditional	Theatrical		June 23, 1990	45 minutes
Heavy ヘヴィ	Japan	Noboru Ishiguro	Artland; Creative Bridge; Nichiei Agency; Nihon Eizō	Traditional	Theatrical		April 14, 1990	50 minutes
Hello Kitty's Thumbelina ハローキティのおやゆびひめ, (Hello Kitty no Oyayubi Hime)	Japan	Hidemi Kubo; Masami Hata (chief director)	Sanrio; Grouper Productions; Toho (distributor)	Traditional	Theatrical	The second of only three feature-length installments in the Sanrio Anime Festival series; based on Hans Christian Andersen's "Thumbelina".	July 21, 1990	43 minutes
How the Shoemakers Raised a War for a Red Skirt; Jak ševci zvedli vojnu pro červenou sukni	Czechoslovakia	Karel Trlica	Ceskoslovenská Televize	Traditional	Television film		June 1, 1990	70 minutes
I skog och mark In Forest and Land	Sweden	Johan Hagelbäck		Traditional	Theatrical		March 23, 1990	57 minutes
An Idol at Will 気ままにアイドル (Kimama ni Idol)	Japan	Junichi Sato	Bandai Co., Ltd. (distributor); Kamakura Super Station; MOVIC; Toei Animation	Traditional	Direct-to-video; OVA		February 25, 1990	47 minutes
In the Summer After the War: 1945 Karafuto 戦争が終わった夏に 1945・樺太（からふと） (Sensō ga Owatta Natsu ni 1945 Karafuto)	Japan	Koji Chino	Karafuto Film Production Committee; Urban Product (distributor)	Traditional	Theatrical	Fictionalization based on the aftermath of the 1945 Soviet invasion of South Sakhalin.	December 8, 1990	70 minutes
Jetsons: The Movie	United States	William Hanna; Joseph Barbera	Hanna-Barbera Productions; Universal Pictures (distributor)	Traditional	Theatrical	Seventh theatrical feature production from Hanna-Barbera; Based on the television series The Jetsons (1962–1987).	July 6, 1990	82 minutes
Kim's Cross キムの十字架 (Kim no Jūjika)	Japan	Tengo Yamada	Tatsunoko Production	Traditional	Theatrical		July 21, 1990	80 minutes
Kobo-chan Special: Filled with Autumn!! コボちゃんスペシャル 秋がいっぱい (Kobo-chan Special: Aki ga Ippai!!)	Japan	Hiroyuki Torii	Eiken; Nippon TV	Traditional	Television special		September 15, 1990	85 minutes
Like the Clouds, Like the Wind 雲のように 風のように (Kumo no yō ni Kaze no yō ni)	Japan	Hisayuki Toriumi	Studio Pierrot; Nippon TV	Traditional	Television film		March 21, 1990	79 minutes
Lupin III: The Hemingway Papers; Rupan Sansei: Hemmingway Paper no Nazo (ルパン三世『ヘミングウェイペーパーの謎』)	Japan	Osamu Dezaki	Tokyo Movie Shinsha; Nippon TV	Traditional	Television special		July 20, 1990	92 minutes
The Magician's Hat; Čarobnjakov šešir	Yugoslavia	Milan Blažeković	Croatia Film	Traditional	Theatrical	Sequel to The Elm-Chanted Forest (1986).	August 19, 1990	75 minutes
Marina the Manga Artist Goes to Camelot 愛と剣のキャメロット 漫画家マリナタイムスリップ事件 (Ai to ken Camelot: Mangaka Marina Time Slip)	Japan	Fumiko Ishii; Osamu Kobayashi	Shueisha; Toho Company	Traditional	Direct-to-video; OVA		August 25, 1990	45 minutes
Maroko 麿子 (MAROKO)	Japan	Mamoru Oshii	Pierrot	Traditional			March 31, 1990	90 minutes
The Mind's Eye: A Computer Animation Odyssey	United States	Jan Nickman	Miramar Images Inc.	Computer	Direct-to-video; Art film Compilation film	First installment in the Mind's Eye film series.	January 1, 1990	40 minutes
The Murder Ticket Is Heart-Colored 殺人切符はハート色 (Satsujin Kippu wa Heart-iro)	Japan	Taku Sugiyama	Deck; Nichiei Agency	Traditional	Direct-to-video; OVA		February 3, 1990	50 minutes
The Murtal Master and 108 Youkai 머털도사와 108 요괴 (Meoteoldosawa 108 Yogoe)	South Korea	Yeom Woo-tae	Shinwon Production Co., Ltd. MBC (distributor)	Traditional	Television film		January 3, 1990	80 minutes
Naksitrallid; Naxi Trawls	Estonia	Avo Paistik		Traditional	Theatrical			61 minutes
New Karate Hell Weird: Blood Apocalypse 新カラテ地獄変 血の黙示録 (Sin Karate Jigokuhen: Chi no Mokushiroku)	Japan	Kōzō Kusuba	Creative Bridge; Nihon Eizō; Deck; Columbia Music Entertainment	Traditional	Direct-to-video; OVA	Part one of a two-part OVA sequence.	November 1, 1990	49 minutes
New Karate Hell Weird: Blood War Gate 新カラテ地獄変 血戦の門 (Sin Karate Jigokuhen: Kessen no Kado)	Japan	Toshiyuki Sakurai	Studio Hibari; Columbia Music Entertainment	Traditional	Direct-to-video; OVA	Part two of a two-part OVA sequence.	December 21, 1990	49 minutes
Nineteen 19 ナインティーン (Jū-kyū)	Japan	Koichi Chigira	Shueisha; Victor Music Industries; Madhouse; Young Jump Video (distributor)	Traditional	Direct-to-video; OVA		July 27, 1990	45 minutes
The Nutcracker Prince	Canada; United States	Paul Schibli	Lacewood Productions; Boulevard Entertainment; Allied Filmmakers	Traditional	Theatrical		November 21, 1990	75 minutes
Obatarian オバタリアン (Obattalion)	Japan	Tetsurō Amino	Sunrise; TV Asahi	Traditional	Television special		April 3, 1990	70 minutes
Ojisan Kaizō Kōza おじさん改造講座 (Uncle Kaizo Koza)	Japan	Tsutomu Shibayama	Nippon Herald Films; Tokyo Movie Shinsha; Nikkan Sports Newspaper	Traditional	Theatrical		February 24, 1990	92 minutes
Onimaru – Five Youths Running on the Battlefield 鬼丸 戦場に駆ける五つの青春 (Onimaru – Senjō ni Kakeru Itsutsu no Seishun)	Japan	Tetsu Dezaki	Madhouse; C.Moon; Bandai Visual	Traditional	Direct-to-video; OVA		April 25, 1990	45 minutes
Peraustrínia 2004	Spain	Ángel García	Fermín Marimón; Laurenfilm (distributor)	Traditional	Theatrical		April 6, 1990	75 minutes
Peter in Magicland; Peterchens Mondfahrt	Germany	Wolfgang Urchs	TC-Film; Trickfilmstudio; A. Film A/S	Traditional	Theatrical	First German animated feature to be made after the German reunification.	November 29, 1990	80 minutes
Project A-Ko Versus Battle 1: Gray Side プロジェクトA子 The VS ＜ヴァーサス＞「GRAY SIDE」	Japan	Katsuhiko Nishijima	Nextart; Studio Fantasia	Traditional	Direct-to-video; OVA	Part one of a two-part OVA sequence.	July 21, 1990	54 minutes
Project A-Ko Versus Battle 2: Blue Side プロジェクトA子 The VS ＜ヴァーサス＞「BLUE SIDE」	Japan	Katsuhiko Nishijima	Nextart; Studio Fantasia	Traditional	Direct-to-video; OVA	Part two of a two-part OVA sequence.	August 21, 1990	54 minutes
The Rescuers Down Under	United States	Hendel Butoy; Mike Gabriel	Walt Disney Feature Animation	Traditional	Theatrical	Sequel to The Rescuers (1977). First Disney animated feature overall to be a sequel, and the first Disney animated film to use the CAPS system; also the first animated feature to fully use digital ink and paint, and to be produced without cameras.	November 16, 1990	77 minutes
Riki-Oh 2: Child of Destruction 力王2 滅びの子 (Riki-Oh 2: Horobi no Ko)	Japan	Tetsu Dezaki	Bandai Visual; Shueisha; Magic Bus	Traditional	Direct-to-video; OVA		August 24, 1990	45 minutes
Robot Taekwon V 90 로보트 태권V 90 (Loboteu Taegwonbeu-i 90)	South Korea	Kim Cheong-gi; Yun Chung-guk	Seoul Donghwa Co., Ltd.	Traditional	Theatrical		July 28, 1990	85 minutes
Rootin' Tootin' Roundup	United States		Walt Disney Productions (archive footage); Robert Heath Inc. Disney Channel	Traditional	Television special Compilation film	Compilation of Western-themed Disney theatrical animated shorts.	August 3, 1990	73 minutes
Soreike! Anpanman: Baikinman no Gyakushuu それいけ！アンパンマン ばいきんまんの逆襲 (Let's Go! Anpanman: Baikinman's Counterattack)	Japan	Akinori Nagaoka	Tokyo Movie Shinsha	Traditional	Theatrical		July 14, 1990	70 minutes
Soreike! Anpanman: Minami no Umi o Sukue! それいけ!アンパンマン みなみの海をすくえ! (Let's Go! Anpanman: Scoop the South Sea!)	Japan	Shunji Ōga	Tokyo Movie Shinsha; Nippon TV	Traditional	Television special	First of two non-Christmas specials in the Soreike! Anpanman anime series, and the eleventh and final animated special produced for Nippon TV's 24 Hour TV "Love Saves the Earth" telethon, and the third of only three specials not to be produced by Tezuka Productions.	August 26, 1990	50 minutes
Summer with Kuro クロがいた夏 (Kuro ga Ita Natsu)	Japan	Takeshi Shirato	GEN Productions; RCC Chugoku Broadcasting; Hiroshima Movie Center; Tiger Production	Traditional	Theatrical		June 4, 1990	67 minutes
Sword for Truth 修羅之介斬魔剣 死鎌紋の男 (Shuranosuke Zanmaken: Shikamamon no Otoko)	Japan	Osamu Dezaki	Promise; Toei Animation; Ginga Production; Studio Hapii; Magic Bus	Traditional	Direct-to-video; OVA		December 28, 1990	49 minutes
TaleSpin: Plunder & Lightning	United States	Larry Latham and Robert Taylor	Walt Disney Television Animation; Walt Disney Television; Buena Vista Television	Traditional	Television film	Pilot film of the television series TaleSpin (1990–1991).	September 7, 1990	91 minutes
Tenjōhen – Utsunomiko 天上編・宇宙皇子 (Heaven Chapter – Utsunomiko)	Japan	Tetsuo Imazawa	Bandai Co., Ltd. Kadokawa Shoten; Toei Animation; TV Tokyo	Traditional	Theatrical; Compilation film	Compilation film of the eventual OVA series based on the manga of the same name that later ran for thirteen 30 minute episodes from October 24, 1990, until February 19, 1992.	September 22, 1990	74 minutes
Tistou, the Boy with Green Thumbs チスト みどりのおやゆび (Tistou Midori no Oyayubi)	Japan	Yuji Tanno	Production I.G; Sony Music Entertainment Japan (distributor)	Traditional	Theatrical	Based on the 1957 book Tistou les pouces verts (Tistou of the Green Thumbs) by Maurice Druon.	March 24, 1990	74 minutes
The Trace Leads to the Silver Lake; Die Spur führt zum Silbersee	East Germany	Günter Rätz	DEFA-Studio für Trickfilme	Stop motion	Theatrical	Final East German animated feature before the German reunification. Produced from 1985 to 1989, released in 1990.	January 16, 1990	84 minutes
Umi Da! Funade Da! Nikoniko, Pun 海だ!船出だ!にこにこ、ぷん (It's the Sea! It's Sailing! Smile, Pun)	Japan	Toshio Hirata	Oh! Production; Kodansha; KSS; NHK Enterprises; Nippon Television Network	Traditional	Theatrical		January 4, 1990	70 minutes
War of the Birds; Fuglekrigen i kanøfleskoven	Denmark	Jannik Hastrup	Dansk Tegnefilm	Traditional	Theatrical		September 28, 1990	68 minutes
Werner – Beinhart!	Germany	Gerhard Hahn, Niki List and Michael Schaack	Neue Constantin Film (distributor); Hahn Film AG; TFC Trickompany Filmproduktion	Traditional	Theatrical	First installment in the Werner film series.	November 29, 1990	93 minutes
A Wind Named Amnesia 風の名はアムネジア (Kaze no Na wa Amunejia)	Japan	Kazuo Yamazaki	Madhouse	Traditional	Theatrical		December 22, 1990	80 minutes

== Highest-grossing animated films of the year ==
Rank	Title	Studio	Worldwide gross	Ref.
1	The Rescuers Down Under	Walt Disney Feature Animation	$47,431,461	
2	Jetsons: The Movie	Hanna-Barbera Productions	$20,305,841	
3	Doraemon: Nobita and the Animal Planet	Asatsu / Toho	$19,000,000 (¥1.91 billion)	
4	DuckTales the Movie: Treasure of the Lost Lamp	Disney MovieToons	$18,115,724	
5	Dragon Ball Z: The World's Strongest	Toei Animation	$10,200,000 (¥1.57 billion)	

== See also ==
- List of animated television series of 1990
