= List of animated feature films of 2005 =

This is a list of animated feature films first released in 2005.

== List ==
Title	Country	Director	Production company	Animation technique	Type	Notes	Release date	Duration
Action Man: X Missions – The Movie	United States	Dale Carman; Keith Lango	Reel FX Creative Studios; Hasbro	Computer	Direct-to-video		2005	70 minutes
Air	Japan	Osamu Dezaki	Toei Animation	Traditional	Theatrical		February 5, 2005	91 minutes
Ali Baba and the Forty Thieves: The Lost Scimitar of Arabia	United States	Rick Ungar	BKN Home Entertainment	Traditional			2005	68 minutes
Aloha, Scooby-Doo!	United States	Tim Maltby	Warner Bros. Family Entertainment; Warner Bros. Animation	Traditional	Direct-to-video		February 8, 2005	74 minutes
Ark	United States; South Korea	Kenny Hwang	Creative Light Worldwide	Computer	Direct-to-video		September 9, 2003 (South Korea); June 2, 2005 (DVD)	84 minutes
Among the Thorns; Bland tistlar	Sweden	Uzi Geffenblad; Lotta Geffenblad		Stop motion		Winner of the Kecskemét City Award at the 5th Festival of European Animated Feature Films and TV Specials.	January 10, 2005	46 minutes
Barbie: Fairytopia	Canada; United States	Walter P. Martishius; Will Lau (co-director)	Mainframe Entertainment; Mattel Entertainment	Computer	Direct-to-video		March 6, 2005 (Nickelodeon); March 8, 2005 (DVD)	70 minutes
Barbie and the Magic of Pegasus	Canada; United States	Greg Richardson	Mainframe Entertainment; Mattel Entertainment	Computer	Direct-to-video		September 18, 2005 (Nickelodeon); September 20, 2005 (DVD)	83 minutes (Argentina); 85 minutes (United States)
The Batman vs. Dracula	United States	Michael Goguen	DC Comics; Warner Bros. Animation; Warner Bros. Family Entertainment	Traditional	Direct-to-video	Spin-off of the animated television series The Batman (2004–08).	October 18, 2005 (DVD); October 22, 2005 (TV)	84 minutes
Bionicle 3: Web of Shadows	United States	Terry Shakespeare; David Molina	Miramax Home Entertainment; Good Story Productions; Creative Capers Entertainment; Create TV & Film; CGCG	Computer	Direct-to-video	Third installment of the Bionicle film series.	October 11, 2005	74 minutes
Black Jack: The Two Doctors of Darkness ブラック・ジャック ふたりの黒い医者 (Burakku Jakku: Futari no Kuroi Isha)	Japan	Makoto Tezuka	Tezuka Productions	Traditional	Theatrical	Spin-off of the animated television series Black Jack (2005–06); set between Episodes 52 and 53 of the respective series.	December 17, 2005	97 minutes
The Book of the Dead aka Book of a Dead Person 死者の書 (Shisha no Sho)	Japan	Kihachirō Kawamoto	Sakura Motion Picture Co., Ltd.	Stop motion	Theatrical		July 8, 2005	70 minutes
Bratz – Rock Angelz	United States		MGA Entertainment	Computer	Direct-to-video		October 4, 2005	77 minutes
Candy Land: The Great Lollipop Adventure	United States	Davis Doi	SD Entertainment; Hasbro Studios	Traditional	Direct-to-video		March 8, 2005	55 minutes
The Care Bears' Big Wish Movie	Canada	Larry Jacobs; Ron Pitts	Nelvana Limited; American Greetings	Computer	Direct-to-video		September 7, 2005 (TIFF); October 18, 2005 (United States)	75 minutes
Chicken Little	United States	Mark Dindal	Walt Disney Feature Animation	Computer	Theatrical		October 30, 2005 (El Capitan Theatre); November 4, 2005	81 minutes
Christmas in New York; Natale a New York	Italy	Orlando Corradi	Mondo TV; SEK Studio	Traditional			2005	88 minutes
Corpse Bride	United Kingdom; United States	Tim Burton; Mike Johnson	Tim Burton Productions; Laika Entertainment	Stop motion	Theatrical		September 7, 2005 (62nd Venice International Film Festival; September 23, 2005 (United States); October 13, 2005 (United Kingdom)	77 minutes
Crayon Shin-chan: The Legend Called Buri Buri 3 Minutes Charge クレヨンしんちゃん 伝説を呼ぶブリブリ 3分ポッキリ大進撃 (Kureyon Shinchan: Densetsu o Yobu Buriburi: Sanpun Bokkiri Daishingeki)	Japan	Yūji Mutō	Shin-Ei Animation	Traditional	Theatrical		April 16, 2005	92 minutes
Detective Conan: Strategy Above the Depths 名探偵コナン 水平線上の陰謀 (Meitantei Konan: Suihei Senjō no Sutoratejī)	Japan	Yasuichiro Yamamoto	TMS Entertainment	Traditional	Theatrical		April 9, 2005	109 minutes
Digital Monster X-Evolution デジタルモンスター ゼヴォリューション (Dejitaru Monsutā Zevoryūshon)	Japan	Hiroyuki Kakudō	Toei Animation; Imagi Animation Studios	Computer	Television film	The eighth film overall in the Digimon anime and media franchise, the second feature after Digimon Adventure 02: Digimon Hurricane Touchdown!! / Transcendent Evolution! The Golden Digimentals (2000) and the only film not connected to any of the nine television series.	January 3, 2005	77 minutes
Dinotopia: Quest for the Ruby Sunstone	United States	Davis Doi	SD Entertainment; Hallmark Entertainment	Traditional			May 17, 2005	75 minutes
Disaster!	United States			Stop-motion			November 4, 2005	83 minutes
DragonBlade: The Legend of Lang 龙刀奇缘	Hong Kong	Antony Szeto	DCDC; China Film	Computer		First 3D-CGI Chinese animated feature film from Hong Kong	January 6, 2005	85 minutes
Duel Masters the Movie: Curse of the Death Phoenix デュエル・マスターズ 闇の城の魔龍凰カース・オブ・ザ・デスフェニックス (Gekijōban Dyueru Masutāzu: Yami no Shiro no Maryuuou)	Japan	Waruo Suzuki	Studio Hibari; Shogakukan-Shueisha Productions	Traditional	Theatrical		March 12, 2005	50 minutes
Empress Chung	South Korea; North Korea	Nelson Shin	AKOM; SEK Studio	Traditional		Considered to be a lost film due to lack of home release and the first North Korean animated feature overall.	August 12, 2005	93 minutes
Escape from Cluster Prime	United States	Rob Renzetti; Chris Savino	Frederator Studios	Traditional	Television film		August 12, 2005	60 minutes
Felix – A Rabbit on a World Tour; Felix – Ein Hase auf Weltreise	Germany			Traditional			February 3, 2005	81 minutes 84 minutes (Germany)
Final Fantasy VII: Advent Children	Japan	Tetsuya Nomura	Visual Works; Square Enix Holdings	Computer			September 14, 2005	101 minutes
Fire Ball 红孩儿大话火焰山	Taiwan			Traditional	Theatrical		May 8, 2005; June 1, 2005 (Taipei Golden Horse Film Festival)	95 minutes
Fullmetal Alchemist the Movie: Conqueror of Shamballa	Japan	Seiji Mizushima	Bones	Traditional			July 23, 2005	105 minutes
Futari wa Pretty Cure Max Heart the Movie	Japan	Atsuji Shimizu	Toei Animation	Traditional			April 16, 2005	70 minutes
Futari wa Pretty Cure Max Heart 2: Friends of the Snow-Laden Sky	Japan	Atsuji Shimizu	Toei Animation	Traditional			December 10, 2005	71 minutes
Gisaku	Spain	Baltasar Pedrosa Clavero; Antonio Santamaría	Filmax	Traditional			March 4, 2005 (Japan); March 17, 2006 (Spain)	78 minutes
The Glass Rabbit ガラスのうさぎ (Garasu no Usagi)	Japan	Setsuko Shibuichi	Magic Bus	Traditional	Theatrical		May 14, 2005	84 minutes
The Golden Blaze	United States	Bryon E. Carson	Urban Entertainment	Flash			April 29, 2005 (United States); May 10, 2005 (DVD)	94 minutes
Gulliver's Travel	India	Anita Udeep	Pentamedia Graphics	Computer			December 23, 2005 (Los Angeles, California)	90 minutes
Hanuman	India	V. G. Samant	Silvertoons; Percept Picture Company	Traditional			October 21, 2005	89 minutes
The Happy Elf	United States	John Rice	HC Productions; Film Roman; DKP Studios; IDT Entertainment	Computer	Television film		December 2, 2005	45 minutes
Heidi	Germany; Canada; United Kingdom	Albert Hanan Kaminski; Alan Simpson	TV-Loonland AG; Nelvana; Telemagination	Traditional			September 26, 2005 (United Kingdom); December 22, 2006 (Germany)	76 minutes
Here Comes Peter Cottontail: The Movie	United States	Mark Gravas		Computer	Direct-to-video		September 17, 2005; March 7, 2006 (DVD premiere)	69 minutes
Hoodwinked!	United States	Cory Edwards; Todd Edwards; Tony Leech	Kanbar Entertainment	Computer	Theatrical		December 16, 2005 (Los Angeles, California); January 13, 2006	80 minutes
Hurdle ハードル	Japan	Satoshi Dezaki	Cinema Tohoku; T&K Telefilm; Magic Bus	Traditional	Theatrical		January 15, 2005	90 minutes
Imaginum	Mexico	Alberto Mar; Isaac Sandoval	Ánima Estudios	Flash			August 19, 2005	82 minutes
Inspector Gadget's Biggest Caper Ever	Canada; United States	Ezekiel Norton	DIC Entertainment; Mainframe Entertainment	Computer	Direct-to-video		September 6, 2005	66 minutes
Kim Possible: So the Drama	United States	Steve Loter	Walt Disney Television Animation	Traditional	Television film		April 8, 2005	68 minutes (original version); 71 minutes (extended edition)
The King: The Story of King David	United States	Richard Kim; Choong Young Lee		Traditional			May 30, 2005	75 minutes
Kirikou and the Wild Beasts; Kirikou et les bêtes sauvages	France	Michel Ocelot	Les Armateurs; Jet Media; Armada	Traditional	Theatrical		May 13, 2005 (Cannes); December 7, 2005 (France)	75 minutes
Klay World: Off the Table	United States			Stop-motion	Direct-to-video			
Kong: King of Atlantis	United States	Patrick Archibald		Traditional			November 22, 2005	69 minutes
Kronk's New Groove	United States	Elliot M. Bour; Saul Andrew Blinkoff	Disneytoon Studios	Traditional	Direct-to-video	Sequel to The Emperor's New Groove (2000).	December 13, 2005	72 minutes
The Land Before Time XI: Invasion of the Tinysauruses	United States	Charles Grosvenor	Universal Cartoon Studios	Traditional	Direct-to-video	Eleventh installment in The Land Before Time film series.	January 11, 2005	81 minutes
The Legend of Frosty the Snowman	United States	Greg Sullivan	Studio B Productions; Classic Media; Top Draw Animation	Traditional	Direct-to-video		October 18, 2005	67 minutes
Let's Go!! Anpanman: Happy's Big Adventure それいけ!アンパンマン ハピーの大冒険 (Soreike! Anpanman Hapī no Daibōken)	Japan	Hiroyuki Yano	Anpanman Production Committee; TMS Entertainment	Traditional	Theatrical		July 16, 2005	51 minutes
Lil' Pimp	United States	Mark Brooks; Peter Gilstrap		Flash	Direct-to-video		January 11, 2005	80 minutes
Lilo & Stitch 2: Stitch Has a Glitch	United States	Tony Leondis; Michael LaBash	Disneytoon Studios	Traditional	Direct-to-video	Direct sequel to Lilo & Stitch (2002), set between the first film and Stitch! The Movie (2003).	August 30, 2005	68 minutes
The Little Polar Bear 2 – The Mysterious Island; Die Kleine Eisbar 2 – Die geheimnisvolle Insel	Germany	Piet De Rycker; Thilo Rothkirch	Rothkirch Cartoon Film	Traditional	Theatrical		September 29, 2005	80 minutes
Little Soldier Zhang Ga 小兵张嘎	China	Sun Lijun	Ai Yi Mei Xun Animation Production Company; Beijing Television; Beijing Film Academy; Youth Film Production Unit	Traditional			June 9, 2005	80 minutes
Lupin III: Angel Tactics ルパン三世 天使の策略 〜夢のカケラは殺しの香り〜 (Rupan Sansei: Tenshi no Takutikusu ~Yume no Kakera wa Koroshi no Kaori~)	Japan	Shigeyuki Miya	TMS Entertainment	Traditional	Television special		July 22, 2005	93 minutes
Madagascar	United States	Eric Darnell; Tom McGrath	DreamWorks Animation; PDI/DreamWorks	Computer	Theatrical		May 27, 2005	86 minutes
The Magic Roundabout	United Kingdom; France	Dave Borthwick; Jean Duval; Frank Passingham	Action Synthese; UK Film Council; Pathé Renn Productions; Pricel; France 2 Cinéma; Canal+ Les Films Action; SPZ Entertainment bolexbrothers limited	Computer	Theatrical		February 2, 2005 (France); February 11, 2005 (United Kingdom)	82 minutes
Midsummer Dream; El Sueño de una noche de San Juan	Spain; Portugal	Ángel de la Cruz; Manolo Gómez	Dygra Films	Computer		First Portuguese animated feature.	July 1, 2005	85 minutes
Mobile Suit Zeta Gundam: A New Translation I – Heirs to the Stars	Japan	Yoshiyuki Tomino	Sunrise	Traditional			October 17, 2004 (Tokyo International Fantastic Film Festival) (premiere); May 28, 2005	94 minutes
Mobile Suit Zeta Gundam: A New Translation II – Lovers	Japan	Yoshiyuki Tomino	Sunrise	Traditional			October 16, 2005 (Tokyo International Fantastic Film Festival) (premiere); October 29, 2005	98 minutes
Mother Teresa; Madre Teresa	Italy	Orlando Corradi	Mondo TV				2005	90 minutes
MovieComic 2 Cine Gibi 2	Brazil	José Márcio Nicolosi	Mauricio de Sousa Produçoes	Traditional	Direct-to-video		September 7, 2005	63 minutes
Mushiking: The Road to the Greatest Champion 劇場版甲虫王者ムシキング グレイテストチャンピオンへの道 (Kouchuu Ouja Mushiking: Greatest Champion e no Michi)	Japan	Shunji Ōga	TMS Entertainment; Sega	Traditional	Theatrical		December 17, 2005	50 minutes
Muttabar; Муттабар	Ukraine	Nikolaj Dubovenko		Traditional			2005	56 minutes
My Little Pony: A Very Minty Christmas	United States	Vic Dal Chele	SD Entertainment; Hasbro	Traditional	Direct-to-video		October 25, 2005	66 minutes (Feature: 44 minutes)
My Scene Goes Hollywood	United States	Eric Fogel	Miramax Family Films	Traditional	Direct-to-video		August 30, 2005	70 minutes
Nagasaki 1945 ~ The Angelus Bells; NAGASAKI 1945 アンゼラスの鐘 (Nagasaki 1945: Anjerasu no kane)	Japan	Seiji Arihara	Mushi Production	Traditional	Theatrical		October 16, 2005	80 minutes
The Nameless Warrior: The Mercenary; El Guerrero sin Nombre	Argentina; Spain	David Iglesias	Patagonik Film Group; Tornasol Films	Computer	Theatrical		November 4, 2005 (San Sebastián Horror and Fantasy Film Festival); April 7, 2006 (Spain)	80 minutes (original); 81 minutes (original)
Naruto the Movie 2: Great Clash! The Illusionary Ruins at the Depths of the Earth	Japan	Hirotsugu Kawasaki	Studio Pierrot	Traditional	Theatrical		August 6, 2005	97 minutes
Olentzero and the Magic Log; Olentzero y el tronco mágico	Spain	Juanjo Elordi	Baleuko S.L.	Computer			November 25, 2005	78 minutes
On a Stormy Night あらしのよるに (Arashi no Yoru Ni)	Japan	Gisaburō Sugii	Group TAC	Traditional			December 10, 2005	107 minutes
One Piece: Baron Omatsuri and the Secret Island; ONE PIECE オマツリ男爵と秘密の島 (Wan Pīsu: Omatsuri Danshaku to Himitsu no Shima)	Japan	Mamoru Hosoda	Toei Animation	Traditional	Theatrical		March 5, 2005	91 minutes
Pettson and Findus: Pettson's Promise; Pettson och Findus 3: Tomtemaskinen	Sweden			Traditional			November 25, 2005	79 minutes 74 minutes (Germany)
The Pilgrim's Progress	United States	Scott Cawthon	Cawthon Entertainment	Computer	Direct-to-video		December 13, 2005	65 minutes
Pirates in Callao; Piratas en el Callao aka Piratas en el Pacífico	Peru	Eduardo Schuldt	Alpamayo Entertainment	Computer		First Peruvian animated feature	February 24, 2005	78 minutes
Pokémon: Lucario and the Mystery of Mew ミュウと波導の勇者 ルカリオ (Myuu to Hadō no Yūsha Rukario)	Japan	Kunihiko Yuyama	OLM, Inc.	Traditional	Theatrical		July 16, 2005	101 minutes
Pooh's Heffalump Movie	United States	Frank Nissen	Disneytoon Studios	Traditional	Theatrical	Last Disneytoon Studios theatrical film animated by Walt Disney Animation Japan.	February 11, 2005	68 minutes
Pooh's Heffalump Halloween Movie	United States	Elliot M. Bour; Saul Andrew Blinkoff	Disneytoon Studios	Traditional	Direct-to-video		September 13, 2005	67 minutes
The Proud Family Movie	United States	Bruce W. Smith	Jambalaya Studio	Traditional	Television film		August 19, 2005	91 minutes
Renart the Fox; Le Roman de Renart	Luxembourg	Thierry Schiel	Oniria Pictures	Computer			August 12, 2005	90 minutes
Rest On Your Shoulder	China			Traditional				
Robots	United States	Chris Wedge; Carlos Saldanha	Blue Sky Studios	Computer	Theatrical		March 6, 2005 (Westwood, Los Angeles); March 11, 2005	90 minutes
Rockman.EXE the Movie: The Program of Light and Darkness 劇場版ロックマンエグゼ 光と闇の遺産 (Gekijōban Rokkuman Eguze: Hikari to Yami no Puroguramu)	Japan	Takao Kato	Xebec	Traditional	Theatrical		March 12, 2005	50 minutes
Scooby-Doo! in Where's My Mummy?	United States	Joe Sichta	Warner Bros. Animation	Traditional	Direct-to-video		May 13, 2005 (Theatrical); December 13, 2005 (Home Video)	75 minutes
Stewie Griffin: The Untold Story	United States	Pete Michels; Peter Shin	Fuzzy Door Productions; Fox Television Animation	Traditional	Direct-to-video		September 27, 2005 (DVD); May 21, 2006 (TV)	88 minutes 66 minutes (TV)
Street Fighter Alpha: Generations	Japan	Ikuo Kuwana	A.P.P.P.	Traditional	Direct-to-video	Non-canon follow-up to Street Fighter Alpha: The Animation (2000).	October 25, 2005	45 minutes
Stuart Little 3: Call of the Wild	United States	Audu Paden	Mainframe Entertainment; Red Wagon Entertainment	Computer	Direct-to-video		October 11, 2005 (Brazil); February 21, 2006 (United States)	75 minutes
Tarzan II	United States	Brian Smith	Disneytoon Studios	Traditional	Direct-to-video	Midquel to Disney's Tarzan (1999).	June 14, 2005	75 minutes
Tennis no Ōjisama – Futari no Samurai	Japan	Takayuki Hamana	Nihon Ad Systems; Production I.G.	Traditional			January 29, 2005	60 minutes
The Three Musketeers; De tre musketerer	Denmark; Latvia	Janis Cimermanis; Gert Fredholm		Stop motion			October 28, 2005 (Paris Mon Premier Festival); July 7, 2006	70 minutes
The Toy Warrior	South Korea	Kyungwon Lim		Traditional			2004	76 minutes
Thru the Moebius Strip	China	Glenn Chaika; Kelvin Lee	Institute of Digital Media Technology	Computer	Direct-to-video		December 30, 2005 (Cannes Film Festival)	87 minutes
Tom and Jerry: Blast Off to Mars	United States	Bill Kopp	Turner Entertainment; Warner Bros. Animation	Traditional	Direct-to-video		January 18, 2005	74 minutes
Tom and Jerry: The Fast and the Furry	United States	Bill Kopp	Turner Entertainment Co. Warner Bros. Animation	Traditional	Direct-to-video		September 3, 2005 (Theatrical); October 11, 2005 (Home media)	75 minutes
Txirri, Mirri y Txiribiton	Spain	Imanol Zinkunegi	Lotura Films	Traditional			2005	70 minutes
Tugger: The Jeep 4x4 Who Wanted to Fly	United States			Computer	Direct-to-video		March 15, 2005	60 minutes
Valiant	United Kingdom; United States	Gary Chapman	Vanguard Animation	Computer	Theatrical		March 25, 2005 (United Kingdom); August 19, 2005 (United States)	76 minutes
VeggieTales: Duke and the Great Pie War	United States	Tim Hodge	Big Idea Productions	Computer	Direct-to-video		March 8, 2005	45 minutes
VeggieTales: Lord of the Beans	United States	Mike Nawrocki	Big Idea Productions	Computer	Direct-to-video		October 29, 2005	45 minutes
VeggieTales: Minnesota Cuke and the Search for Samson's Hairbrush	United States	Tim Hodge	Big Idea Productions	Computer	Direct-to-video		June 25, 2005	43 minutes
Wallace & Gromit: The Curse of the Were-Rabbit	United Kingdom	Nick Park; Steve Box	Aardman Animations; DreamWorks Animation	Stop motion	Theatrical		September 4, 2005 (Sydney); October 7, 2005 (United States); October 14, 2005 (United Kingdom)	85 minutes
Xuxinha and Guto against the Space Monsters	Brazil	Moacyr Góes; Clewerson Saremba	Diler & Associados; Xuxa Produções; Labocine; Warner Bros. Pictures; Twister; Globo Filmes	Flash			December 25, 2005	85 minutes
xxxHolic: A Midsummer Night's Dream 劇場版 xxxHOLiC 真夏ノ夜ノ夢 (Gekijōban Horikku – Manatsu no Yoru no Yume)	Japan	Tsutomu Mizushima	Production I.G	Traditional	Theatrical		August 20, 2005	60 minutes

== Highest-grossing films ==
The following is a list of the 10 highest-grossing animated feature films first released in 2005.

Highest-grossing animated films of 2005
Rank	Title	Studio	Worldwide gross	Ref.
1	Madagascar	DreamWorks Animation	$542,063,846	
2	Chicken Little	Walt Disney Feature Animation	$314,432,837	
3	Robots	Blue Sky Studios	$260,718,330	
4	Wallace & Gromit: The Curse of the Were-Rabbit	Aardman Animations	$197,593,152	
5	Corpse Bride	Laika / Tim Burton Productions	$118,090,836	
6	Hoodwinked!	Kanbar Animation / Blue Yonder Films	$110,013,167	
7	Valiant	Vanguard Animation	$61,746,888	
8	Pooh's Heffalump Movie	DisneyToon Studios	$52,858,433	
9	Pokémon: Lucario and the Mystery of Mew	OLM, Inc.	$37,150,760	
10	Detective Conan: Strategy Above the Depths	TMS Entertainment	$18,723,952	

== See also ==
- List of animated television series of 2005
