= Cipher (manga) =

Japanese manga series by Minako Narita

- The first volume of Cipher released by Hakusensha.
- Manga
- Written by: Minako Narita
- Published by: Hakusensha
- English publisher: CMX
- Imprint: Hana to Yume Comics
- Magazine: LaLa
- Original run: February 1985 – December 1990
- Volumes: 12
- Original video animation
- Directed by: Tsuneo Tominaga
- Produced by: Isamu Senda; Tetsu Dezaki
- Written by: Machiko Kondō; Yūko Sakurai
- Studio: Magic Bus
- Released: March 3, 1989
- Runtime: 40 minutes

Cipher is a shōjo manga series written and illustrated by Minako Narita. It was serialized in Hakusensha's LaLa magazine from the December 1984 issue to the March 1985 issue, and was collected in Japan in twelve tankōbon volumes and seven bunkoban volumes.

A sequel manga series titled Alexandrite was published in LaLa from 1991 to 1992, and compiled in Japan in seven tankōbon volumes and four bunkoban volumes.

Cipher was also adapted into a promotional English-language OVA titled Cipher the Video in 1989, with Narita's input and involvement.

== Plot ==
The story of Cipher is set in mid-1980s America, mainly New York City. It concerns the lives of former child stars twins Shiva (Jake Lang) and Cipher (Roy Lang), who mysteriously began to trade places until the two became synonymous with each other. Anise Murphy is a classmate of Shiva's, and shortly after becoming acquainted with him ends up entangled in a bet to see if she can tell the two apart after living at their apartment for two weeks.

== Characters ==
- Anise Murphy
- Jake Lang (Shiva)
- Roy Lang (Cipher)
- Rob
- Jessica
- Ruth
- Alex Levine
- Haru (Hal) Takeshita
- Jean Lang

== OVA cast ==
The voice acting for the OVA was done entirely in English, without a Japanese version. Most of the cast consisted of bilingual Japanese actors and a few native English speakers in Japan.

Cast
Character	Actor
Jake "Shiva" Lang	Jay Kabira
Roy "Cipher" Lang	Jay Kabira
Elly	Elly Narita
Eric Laurence	Mark Helgesen
Fred Williams	Eugene Nomura
Isabelle Jones	Jennifer Watt
Radio announcer	Mark Helgesen
Radio DJ	Yuko Yunokawa
Female commercial narrator	Yuko Yunokawa
Male commercial narrator	Mark Helgesen
Gingerman	Lisa Patrick
TV narrator	Hidekazu Nakamura
TV announcer	Derek Siler
Interviewer 1	Yuko Yunokawa
Teammates	Derek Siler Hidekazu Nakamura
Girl	Jennifer Watt
Man 1	Derek Siler
Old woman	Yuko Yunokawa
Man 2	Eugene Nomura
Young girl	Lisa Patrick
Interviewer 2	Yoko Narahashi
Yoko of Mescaline Drive	Yoko Utsumi

== Media ==
=== Manga ===
Cipher is written and illustrated by Minako Narita. It was serialized in the monthly magazine LaLa from the February 1985 issue to the December 1990 issue. The chapters were later released in 12 bound volumes by Hakusensha under the Hana to Yume Comics imprint.

CMX licensed the series as an 11 volume run in North America in 2005. It went out of print when DC Comics shut down the CMX imprint in 2010.

==== Tankōbon editions ====
No.	Original release date	Original ISBN	English release date	English ISBN
1	July 25, 1985	978-4-592-11821-3	October 1, 2005	978-1-401-20802-8
2	December 25, 1985	978-4-592-11822-0	February 1, 2006	978-1-401-20803-5
3	July 25, 1986	978-4-592-11823-7	April 1, 2006	978-1-401-20804-2
4	November 25, 1986	978-4-592-11824-4	July 6, 2006	978-1-401-20805-9
5	April 25, 1987	978-4-592-11825-1	October 4, 2006	978-1-401-20806-6
6	November 25, 1987	978-4-592-11826-8	January 3, 2007	978-1-401-20807-3
7	April 25, 1988	978-4-592-11827-5	April 7, 2007	978-1-401-20808-0
8	November 25, 1988	978-4-592-11828-2	July 4, 2007	978-1-401-20809-7
9	May 25, 1989	978-4-592-11829-9	October 10, 2007	978-1-401-20810-3
10	November 25, 1989	978-4-592-11830-5	January 15, 2008	978-1-401-20811-0
11	June 25, 1990	978-4-592-12141-1	April 30, 2008	978-1-401-20812-7
12	December 25, 1990	978-4-592-12142-8	N/A	—
