= TM Network discography =

- Studio albums: 13
- EPs: 1
- Live albums: 4
- Compilation albums: 12
- Singles: 41
- Video albums: 40 (Note: This includes the music video compilation albums and concert DVDs.)
- Remix albums: 5
- Box sets: 4
- Video games: 1

The discography of the Japanese band TM Network consists of thirteen studio albums, twelve compilation albums, and forty one singles released since 1984.

== Albums ==
=== Studio albums ===
Year	Information	Oricon weekly peak position	Sales	RIAJ certification
1984	Rainbow Rainbow: Released: April 21, 1984; Label: Epic Records; Formats: LP, CD, cassette	71	8,000	
1985	Childhood's End: Released: June 21, 1985; Label: Epic Records; Formats: LP, CD, cassette	40	13,000	
1986	Gorilla: Released: June 4, 1986; Label: Epic Records; Formats: LP, CD, cassette	15	42,000	
1987	Self Control: Released: February 26, 1987; Label: Epic Records; Formats: LP, CD, cassette	3	262,000	
1987	humansystem: Released: November 11, 1987; Label: Epic Records; Formats: LP, CD, cassette	1	377,000	
1988	Carol: A Day in a Girl's Life 1991: Released: December 9, 1988; Label: Epic Records; Formats: LP, CD, cassette	1	660,000	
1990	Rhythm Red: Released: October 25, 1990; Label: Epic Records; Formats: CD, cassette, MD	1	593,000	Platinum
1991	Expo: Released: September 5, 1991; Label: Sony Records; Formats: CD, cassette, MD	1	648,000	Platinum
2000	Major Turn-Round: Released: December 25, 2000; Label: Rojam; Formats: LP, CD	25	21,000	
2004	Network TM -Easy Listening-: Released: March 24, 2004; Label: gaball screen; Formats: CD	12	36,000	
2007	Speedway: Released: December 5, 2007; Label: gaball screen; Formats: CD	12		
2014	QUIT30: Released: October 29, 2014; Label: Avex Trax; Formats: CD	8		
2026	Quantum: Released: September 23, 2026; Label: Sony Music; Formats: CD	8	9,390	

=== Extended plays ===
Year	Information	Oricon weekly peak position	Sales	RIAJ certification
1985	Twinkle Night: Released: November 28, 1985; Label: Epic Records; Formats: EP	57	4,000	

=== Live albums ===
Year	Information	Oricon weekly peak position	Sales	RIAJ certification
1992	TM Colosseum I: Released: August 21, 1992; Label: Epic Records; Formats: CD, cassette, MD	1	339,000	Gold
1992	TM Colosseum II: Released: August 21, 1992; Label: Epic Records; Formats: CD, cassette, MD	2	325,000	Gold
1994	TMN Final Live Last Groove 5.18: Released: August 11, 1994; Label: Epic Records; Formats: CD, MD	3	149,000	
1994	TMN Final Live Last Groove 5.19: Released: August 11, 1994; Label: Epic Records; Formats: CD, MD	4	142,000	

=== Compilations ===
Band release

Year	Information	Oricon weekly peak position	Sales	RIAJ certification
1987	Gift for Fanks: Released: July 1, 1987; Label: Epic Records; Formats: CD	1	222,000	
1994	Tetsuya Komuro Presents TMN Black: Released: June 22, 1994; Label: Epic Records; Formats: CD, MD	2	368,000	Gold
1994	Takashi Utsunomiya Presents TMN Red: Released: June 22, 1994; Label: Epic Records; Formats: CD, MD	4	218,000	Gold
1994	Naoto Kine Presents TMN Blue: Released: June 22, 1994; Label: Epic Records; Formats: CD, MD	5	203,000	Gold
1996	Time Capsule: All the Singles: Released: December 12, 1996; Label: Epic Records; Formats: CD	3	528,000	Platinum
2004	Welcome to the Fanks!: Released: December 22, 2004; Label: Epic Records; Formats: CD	18	29,000	
2008	The Singles 1: Released: May 28, 2008; Label: Sony Music Direct; Formats: CD	30		
2009	The Singles 2: Released: September 30, 2009; Label: Sony Music Direct; Formats: CD	39		
2012	Original Singles 1984—1999: Released: May 23, 2012; Label: Sony Music Direct; Formats: CD	26		
2012	Original Single Back Tracks 1984—1999: Released: May 23, 2012; Label: Sony Music Direct; Formats: CD	55		
2020	Gift from Fanks T: Released: March 18, 2020; Label: Sony Music Direct; Formats: CD, digital	—		
2020	Gift from Fanks M: Released: March 18, 2020; Label: Avex Trax; Formats: CD, digital	—		

Label release

Year	Information	Oricon weekly peak position	Sales	RIAJ certification
1999	Star Box: TM Network: Released: January 30, 1999; Label: Epic Records; Formats: CD	8	89,000	
1999	Star Box: TMN: Released: January 30, 1999; Label: Epic Records; Formats: CD	14	66,000	
2000	Best Tracks: A Message to the Next Generation: Released: March 23, 2000; Label: Epic Records; Formats: CD	26	35,000	
2003	The Legend: TM Network: Released: January 1, 2003; Label: Epic Records; Formats: CD	96	7,000	
2008	TM Network Best of Best: Released: July 2, 2008; Label: Sony Music Direct; Formats: CD	—		
2008	TM Network Super Best: Released: July 20, 2008; Label: Sony Music Direct; Formats: CD	—		
2017	Get Wild Song Mafia: Released: April 5, 2017; Label: Avex Trax; Formats: CD, digital	4		

=== Remix albums ===
Year	Information	Oricon weekly peak position	Sales	RIAJ certification
1989	Dress: Released: May 12, 1989; Label: Epic Records; Formats: LP, CD, cassette	1	544,000	Platinum
1993	TMN Classix 1: Released: August 21, 1993; Label: Epic Records; Formats: CD, MD	1	248,000	Gold
1993	TMN Classix 2: Released: August 21, 1993; Label: Epic Records; Formats: CD, MD	2	240,000	Gold
2003	Kiwoku to Kiroku ~ Major Turn-Round: Released: February 5, 2003; Label: R&C Japan / gaball screen; Formats: CD	25	21,000	
2014	Dress 2: Released: April 22, 2014; Label: Avex Trax; Formats: CD, digital	7		

=== Box sets ===
Year	Information	Oricon weekly peak position	Sales	RIAJ certification
1994	Groove Gear 1984—1994: Released: May 26, 1994; Label: Epic Records; Formats: 3 CD + VHS	4	54,000	
2004	World Heritage Double-Decade Complete Box: Released: March 31, 2004; Label: Epic Records; Formats: 24 CD + 2 DVD	40	8,000	
2014	Carol: Deluxe Edition: Released: December 24, 2014; Label: Sony Music Direct; Formats: 3 CD +2 LP + DVD	—		

== Singles ==
List of singles, with selected chart positions
Title	Date	Peak chart positions	Sales (JPN)	RIAJ certification	Album
Title	Date	Oricon Singles Charts	Sales (JPN)	RIAJ certification	Album
"Kin'yōbi no Lion (Take It to the Lucky)"	April 21, 1984	—			Rainbow Rainbow
"1974 (16-kōnen no Hōmonsha)"	July 21, 1984	44	13,000		Rainbow Rainbow
"Accident"	May 22, 1985	35	13,000		Childhood's End
"Dragon the Festival" (Zoo Mix)	July 21, 1985	18	36,000		Childhood's End
"Your Song" ("D" Mix)	November 1, 1985	14	39,000		Twinkle Night
"Come on Let's Dance" (This Is the Fanks Dyna-mix)	April 21, 1986	19	44,000		Gorilla
"Girl"	August 27, 1986	32	20,000		Gorilla
"All-Right-All-Night (No Tears No Blood)"	November 21, 1986	41	21,000		Self Control
"Self Control (Hakobune ni Hikarete)"	February 1, 1987	33	39,000		Self Control
"Get Wild"	April 8, 1987	9	231,000		Gift for Fanks
"Kiss You (Sekai wa Uchū to Koi ni Ochiru)"	October 1, 1987	4	111,000		humansystem
"Resistance"	January 1, 1988	6	116,000		humansystem
"Beyond the Time ~Möbius no Sora wo Koete~"	March 5, 1988	4	221,000		Carol: A Day in a Girl's Life 1991
"Seven Days War"	July 21, 1988	3	218,000		Seven Days War: Music from the Original Motion Picture Soundtrack
"Come on Everybody"	November 17, 1988	3	209,000		Carol: A Day in a Girl's Life 1991
"Just One Victory (Tatta Hitotsu no Shōri)" (Remix Version)	March 21, 1989	6	117,000		Carol: A Day in a Girl's Life 1991
"Come on Everybody" (with Nile Rodgers)	April 15, 1989	5	89,000		Dress
"Kiss You (Kiss Japan)"	April 15, 1989	7	82,000		Dress
"Get Wild '89"	April 15, 1989	3	129,000		Dress
"Dive Into Your Body"	July 21, 1989	2	303,000	Gold	TMN Classix 1
"Kin'yōbi no Lion (Take It to the Lucky)" [Reissue]	September 21, 1989	38	8,000		Rainbow Rainbow
"The Point of Lovers' Night"	July 7, 1990	1	327,000	Gold	Rhythm Red
"Time to Count Down"	September 28, 1990	1	264,000	Gold	Rhythm Red
"Rhythm Red Beat Black"	December 21, 1990	3	200,000	Gold	Rhythm Red
"Rhythm Red Beat Black (Version 2.0)"	February 1, 1991	3			Takashi Utsunomiya Presents TMN Red
"Love Train" / "We Love the Earth"	May 22, 1991	1	533,000	Platinum	Expo
"Wild Heaven"	November 15, 1991	1	399,000	Platinum	TMN Classix 2
"Ichizu na Koi"	September 29, 1993	1	306,000	Gold	Groove Gear 1984—1994
"Nights of the Knife"	April 21, 1994	1	430,000	Platinum	Groove Gear 1984—1994
"Get Wild Decade Run"	July 22, 1999	5	232,000	Gold	Kiwoku to Kiroku ~ Major Turn-Round
"10 Years After"	July 28, 1999	4	170,000		Kiwoku to Kiroku ~ Major Turn-Round
"Happiness x 3 Loneliness x 3"	December 22, 1999	9	80,000		Kiwoku to Kiroku ~ Major Turn-Round
"Message"	July 27, 2000	—			Major Turn-Round
"Ignition, Sequence, Start"	October 25, 2000	—			Major Turn-Round
"We Are Starting Over"	November 27, 2000	—			Major Turn-Round
"Castle in the Clouds"	October 30, 2002	9	36,000		Kiwoku to Kiroku ~ Major Turn-Round
"Network TM"	February 25, 2004	13	28,000		Network TM -Easy Listening-
"Welcome Back 2"	October 31, 2007	16			Speedway
"I Am"	April 25, 2012	5			Dress 2
"Green Days 2013"	July 20, 2013	—			Non-album single
"Loud"	April 22, 2014	12			QUIT30
"Get Wild 2015"	March 21, 2015	—			Get Wild Song Mafia
"—" denotes releases that did not chart.

== Videography ==
List of media, with selected chart positions
Title	Album details	Peak positions		Sales (Oricon)
Title	Album details	JPN DVD	JPN Blu-ray	Sales (Oricon)
Vision Festival (Journey to Saga)	Released: August 25, 1985; Label: Epic Records; Formats: LD, VHS, Beta	—	—	N/A
Fanks "Fantasy" Dyna-mix	Released: December 1, 1986; Label: Epic Records; Formats: LD, VHS, Beta	—	—	N/A
Self Control and the Scenes from "The Shooting"	Released: August 1, 1987; Label: Epic Records; Formats: LD, VHS, Beta	—	—	N/A
Gift for Fanks Since 1985—1988	Released: August 21, 1988; Label: Epic Records; Formats: LD, VHS, Beta	—	—	N/A
Fanks the Live 1: Fanks Cry-max	Released: August 21, 1989; Label: Epic Records; Formats: LD, VHS, Beta	—	—	N/A
Fanks the Live 2: Kiss Japan Dancing Dyna-mix	Released: September 21, 1989; Label: Epic Records; Formats: LD, VHS, Beta	—	—	N/A
Fanks the Live 3: Camp Fanks!! '89	Released: October 21, 1989; Label: Epic Records; Formats: LD, VHS, Beta	—	—	N/A
Fanks the Live 4: Fanks	Released: 1989; Label: Epic Records; Formats: VHS	—	—	N/A
Carol	Released: May 21, 1990; Label: Epic Records; Formats: LD, VHS, Beta	—	—	N/A
Rhythm Red Beat Black	Released: December 21, 1990; Label: Epic Records; Formats: LD, VHS, Beta	—	—	N/A
World's End I: Rhythm Red Live	Released: March 29, 1991; Label: Epic Records; Formats: LD, VHS, Beta	—	—	N/A
World's End II: Rhythm Red Live	Released: May 22, 1991; Label: Epic Records; Formats: LD, VHS, Beta	—	—	N/A
Expo Arena Final	Released: May 26, 1994; Label: Epic Records; Formats: LD, VHS	—	—	N/A
Decade (TM Network 1984—1994)	Released: June 22, 1994; Label: Epic Records; Formats: LD, VHS	—	—	N/A
TMN Final Live: Last Groove 5.18	Released: August 1, 1994; Label: Epic Records; Formats: LD, VHS	—	—	N/A
TMN Final Live: Last Groove 5.19	Released: August 1, 1994; Label: Epic Records; Formats: LD, VHS	—	—	N/A
Live Tour Major Turn-Round 01: Turn-Round Edition	Released: November 21, 2001; Label: Pony Canyon; Formats: DVD, VHS	—	—	N/A
Live Tour Major Turn-Round 02: Encore + D. Harada V-Mix Edition	Released: December 5, 2001; Label: Pony Canyon; Formats: DVD, VHS	—	—	N/A
Live Tour Major Turn-Round 03: Premium Edition	Released: 2001; Label: Pony Canyon; Formats: VHS	—	—	N/A
Live in Naeba '03: Formation Lap	Released: February 20, 2004; Label: gaball screen; Formats: DVD	—	—	N/A
Bee Presents: TM Visions	Released: March 31, 2004; Label: Epic Records; Formats: DVD	—	—	N/A
Carol the Live	Released: April 21, 2004; Label: Epic Records; Formats: DVD	—	—	N/A
TM Network Double-Decade Tour "Network"	Released: September 1, 2004; Label: gaball screen; Formats: DVD	—	—	N/A
All the Clips	Released: December 22, 2004; Label: Epic Records; Formats: DVD	—	—	N/A
World's End: Rhythm Red Live	Released: March 9, 2005; Label: Epic Records; Formats: DVD	—	—	N/A
TM Network Tribute Live 2003	Released: April 8, 2005; Label: M-Tres; Formats: DVD	—	—	N/A
Spin-Off from TM: Tribute Live 2005	Released: October 1, 2005; Label: M-Tres; Formats: DVD	—	—	N/A
Spin-Off from TM: 8 Songs, and More	Released: October 1, 2005; Label: M-Tres; Formats: DVD	—	—	N/A
Spin-Off from TM 2007: Tribute Live III	Released: September 12, 2007; Label: M-Tres; Formats: DVD	—	—	N/A
TM Network Remaster at Nippon Budokan 2007	Released: April 2, 2008; Label: gaball screen; Formats: DVD	27	—	N/A
TM Network Concert: Incubation Period	Released: September 12, 2012; Label: Avex Trax; Formats: DVD, Blu-ray	10	3	N/A
TM Network Final Mission: Start Investigation	Released: December 11, 2013; Label: Avex Trax; Formats: DVD, Blu-ray	28	8	N/A
TM Network 30th 1984: The Beginning of the End	Released: September 24, 2014; Label: Avex Trax; Formats: DVD, Blu-ray	34	14	N/A
TM Network the Movie 1984	Released: April 22, 2015; Label: Sony Music Direct; Formats: DVD	11	—	N/A
TM Network 30th 1984: QUIT30 Huge Data	Released: July 22, 2015; Label: Avex Trax; Formats: DVD, Blu-ray	59	5	N/A
TM Network 30th Final	Released: November 25, 2015; Label: Avex Trax; Formats: DVD, Blu-ray	43	14	N/A
TM Network 2012—2015	Released: March 23, 2016; Label: Avex Trax; Formats: Blu-ray	—	36	N/A
TM Network: The Videos 1984—1994	Released: May 22, 2019; Label: Sony Music Direct; Formats: Blu-ray	—	4	N/A
All the Clips 1984—1999 Refinement	Released: August 26, 2020; Label: Sony Music Direct; Formats: Blu-ray	—	13	N/A
Decade 2020 HD Remaster	Released: September 7, 2020; Label: Sony Music Direct; Formats: Blu-ray	—	15	N/A

== Video games ==
List of video games
Title	Platform(s)	Game details
TM Network: Live in Power Bowl	Nintendo Family Computer	Released: December 22, 1989; Publisher: CBS Sony
