= Inochi no Chikyuu: Dioxin no Natsu =

2001 film by Satoshi Dezaki

いのちの地球 ダイオキシンの夏 (Inochi No Chikyuu - Dioxin No Natsu)
- Genre: Drama
- Created by: Kei Hasumi
- Anime film
- Directed by: Satoshi Dezaki; Mitsutaka Noshitani (animation); Setsuko Shibuichi (assistant)
- Produced by: Sōzaburō Katsura; Tetsuo Sanjō; Masashi Kimura; Kazumi Koide
- Written by: Kazumi Koide; Mitsuyo Suenaga
- Music by: Tomoki Hasegawa
- Studio: Magic Bus
- Released: August 18, 2001
- Runtime: 83 minutes

Life on Earth - The Summer of Dioxin (いのちの地球 ダイオキシンの夏, Inochi no Chikyū - Daiokishin no Natsu), also known as Tracing the Gray Summer, is a 2001 Japanese anime drama film directed by Satoshi Dezaki. An adaptation of the 1998 book by Kei Hasumi published by Iwasaki Publishing, the film recounts the true story of the Seveso disaster, a chemical incident occurred over the Italian town of Seveso in 1976, which is still considered one of the worst ecological disasters in history. The film was selected by the Ministry of Education, Culture, Sports, Science and Technology (MEXT) and endorsed by the Japan Society for the Appreciation of Outstanding Films and the Governor of Tokyo.

== Plot ==
Italy, Summer 1976. Giulia Bianchi, Maria, Enrico, Lucio and Angelo are a group of friends who live and study in the town of Seveso, not far from Milan. Their lives dramatically change on July 10, when during the party for Giulia's birthday one of the reactors of the close ICMESA chemical plant collapses, spreading into the air a massive, menacing cloud that falls over the surrounding area, covering everything under a white and irritating dust. First news says that the cloud and the subsequent dust were made of trichlorophenol, a substance toxic for plants but almost harmless to animals and humans, so for days Seveso's inhabitants continue with their lives as if nothing ever happened. Soon however things turn bad when the animals of Seveso begin to die in droves, and many inhabitants, especially among the aged ones, become sick with no apparent reason.

In search for answers, Giulia and her group, supported by the Japanese journalist Shiro Ando, begin their own investigation, and talking both with an ICMESA's worker and a chemistry professor they soon discover a terrible truth: the cloud released over the town was actually made of trichlorophenol for real, but due to the reactor's excessive temperature part of the substance, immediately after the release, has turned into something incredibly more dangerous: dioxin. Thanks to Ando and Enrico's father, who is the Mayor of Seveso, they're able to reveal the truth to the inhabitants, and immediately most of Seveso is evacuated in order to save as many persons as possible from dioxin's deadly effects, but it's already too late. Too much time has passed since the initial contamination, and many inhabitants, including Maria, contract chloracne, as much as many other illnesses linked to excessive exposure to dioxin (kidney failure, liver failure and cancer).

To make matters worse, the scientific community reveals that dioxin is a potential risk for pregnant women since it can provoke malformations and mental diseases in the fetuses. For this, the Italian government gave a temporary authorization to the abortion (still illegal in Italy in 1976), to spare many future parents from having a malformed or demented child. Subsequent investigations conducted by Shiro reveal one more devastating secret: the journalist's work, in fact, demonstrates that Roche, the corporation that controls the ICMESA, had voluntarily ignored many safety standards to save over the plant's costs, like creating a safety tank for the losses or train its workers to deal with such menaces. Plus this, Ando finds out that the Roche had been aware of the incident's true dimensions since the beginning, but it decided to keep the secret as long as possible in order to have enough time to destroy every proof of its crimes.

All of these proofs however will not be enough to assure that the Roche's owners will pay for their guilt, but the corporation's reputation will be publicly destroyed during a press conference by Giulia and her friends, even if this will not be enough to forget Seveso's sufferings. Sometime later, Anna, Giulia's sister, who had decided to proceed with her pregnancy despite the risks, will give birth to a healthy girl, but at the opposite the old miss. Sonia will prematurely die, killed by dioxin.
