= Osamu Ishiwata =

Japanese manga artist

Osamu Ishiwata (石渡治, Ishiwata Osamu, born May 16, 1959 in Kanagawa, Japan) is a Japanese manga artist. He won the 1989 Shogakukan Manga Award for shōnen for B.B. The manga artist Yoshitomo Yoshimoto is his younger brother.

== Works ==
- Osamu Ishiwata Masterpiece Collection (石渡治傑作集)
- Juugatsu no Mangetsu ni Ichiban Chikai Doyoubi (10月の満月に一番近い土曜日)
- Super Rider (スーパーライダー)
- Takeru (タケル)
- Passport Blue (パスポート・ブルー)
- Happy Man
- B.B.
- Hi no Tama Boy (火の玉ボーイ)
- Ragtime Brass (ラグタイムブルース)
- Love
- 2 (ツヴァイ)
- Hakuhei Musha (白兵武者)
- Odds (オッズ)
- Live A Live (character designer, "The Wild West" chapter)
