= B.B. (manga) =

Japanese manga series by Osamu Ishiwata

- B.B
- Shōnen Sunday featuring B.B.

ビービー (Bī Bī)
- Genre: Action
- Manga
- Written by: Osamu Ishiwata
- Published by: Shogakukan
- Imprint: Shōnen Sunday Comics
- Magazine: Weekly Shōnen Sunday
- Original run: May 29, 1985 – February 20, 1991
- Volumes: 31
- Original video animation
- Directed by: Osamu Dezaki
- Written by: Machiko Kondō
- Music by: Yuuki Nakajima
- Studio: Magic Bus
- Released: April 25, 1990 – April 25, 1991
- Episodes: 3

B.B. (ビービー, Bī Bī) is a Japanese manga series written and illustrated by Osamu Ishiwata. The manga ran in Shogakukan's shōnen manga magazine Weekly Shōnen Sunday from 1985 issue 24 to 1991 issue 9. The title stands for "Burning Blood" and Ishiwata's subsequent serial LOVe was a continuation of this series. In 1989, B.B. won the Shogakukan Manga Award in the shōnen category.

== Plot ==
One night after leaving a club where he was playing trumpet Ryō Takagi is jumped by a motorcycle gang. The scuffle spills out into the streets and causes a traffic accident. Ryō eventually gives up his musical career and joins the world of underground boxing as he struggles to overcome his "burning blood" and the anger that easily overtakes him.

== Characters ==
- Ryo Takagi - Kazuhiko Inoue
- Jin Moriyama - Show Hayami
- Minoru "Sorry" Satou - Toshihiko Seki
- Koyuki Matsuhara - Noriko Hidaka
- Kouichi Wakabayashi - Hideyuki Hori
- Su-chan - Yūko Mizutani
- Makoto "Ottosei" Otobe - Tesshō Genda
- Gentarou Takagi - Masaru Ikeda
- Fox Fire Head - Akio Ōtsuka

== Game ==
It was adapted into a pachinko game by okamura under the title cr B.B. It was released on 1 April 2000.
