= Wonder Beat Scramble =

Japanese anime television series

ワンダービートS
- Created by: Osamu Tezuka
- Anime television series
- Directed by: Satoshi Dezaki (#1–15); Seiji Arihara (#16–26)
- Produced by: Satoshi Itō; Masashi Tadakuma
- Written by: Kazumi Koide; Toshiaki Imaizumi
- Music by: Hajime Mizoguchi; Ryō Yonemitsu
- Studio: Mushi Production (Note: Production); Magic Bus (Note: Animation)
- Original network: TBS
- Original run: April 16, 1986 – November 19, 1986
- Episodes: 26

Wonder Beat Scramble (ワンダービートS, Wandā Bīto Sukuranburu), also known as Micro Nauts, is a Japanese science fiction anime series planned and supervised by Osamu Tezuka in his later years, which ran from April 16 to November 19, 1986, on TBS-affiliated networks. Produced by Mushi Production, Tokyo Broadcasting System and Tokyu Agency, it was directed by Satoshi Dezaki and Seiji Arihara, with Arihara, Tsuneo Tominaga and Sunao Katabuchi serving as chief unit directors, Setsuko Shibuichi designing the characters, Yūichi Higuchi designing the mechanical elements and Ryō Yonemitsu and Hajime Mizoguchi composing the music. This is the first TV anime work of the newly established Mushi Production after its bankruptcy, and is an original project by Satoshi Itō based on the "Bacteria Rangers" of the 1963 Astro Boy TV series. The story was overseen by scholars in the fields of medicine and physiology, and at the end of each episode, Tezuka, himself being a Doctor of Medicine, appeared in live-action segments to explain the organs of the human body and physiological functions.

== Plot ==
In the year 2119, the space life exploration ship Greensleeves encountered the wandering planet X23, and after discovering traces of the extinction of advanced civilization on other planets that X23 had passed through, the World Federation ordered Greensleeves to destroy X23, but its captain, Isao Sugita, refused and cut off all communication.

Two years later, Isao's eldest son, Susumu, who lives in Nagisa City, is suddenly taken to the Phoenix Tower of the Institute for Comprehensive Health Science, where Dr. Miya asks him to join the White Pegasus, a special medical unit. In Nagisa City, a number of residents are collapsing due to unexplained health problems, and they are to be treated by injecting the special intra-vehicle entry vessel "Wonder Beat" into the affected areas by micronizing it. Thus begins the battle between Susumu and the rest of the White Pegasus team and the unidentified aliens who repeatedly attack the human body.

== Characters ==
=== White Pegasus ===
Susumu Sugita (スギタ・ススム, Sugita Susumu)
Voiced by: Mayumi Tanaka
A 13-year-old boy living in Nagisa City. He has a compassionate and caring personality, and has been living a rough life due to accusations directed at his father. At the request of Dr. Miya, he joins the White Pegasus.
Doctor Miya (ドクター・ミヤ, Dokutā Miya)
Voiced by: Ichirō Nagai
Director of Phoenix Tower, a comprehensive health science research institute in Nagisa City. Doctor of Medicine. He developed the Micronizer System in order to counter the unidentified "HIEU" (Vijur aliens, "Highly Intelligent Elusive UFO") that repeatedly attack the human body. He is invaded by them in the last episode.
Mayumi (マユミ)
Voiced by: Mayumi Shō
Dr. Miya's niece. She is the same age as Susumu. She volunteers to work as Miya's secretary and later becomes Susumu's girlfriend. According to the pilot version's production materials, her last name is Miya. Her body is invaded by the aliens in episode 14.
Bio (ビオ)
Voiced by: Hiroko Emori
Data accumulation robot. It understands human language and can think and act autonomously. Inside the Wonder Beat, it searches for the life cores of Medro Monsters that have invaded the operator and the human body. Often acts like a senior to Susumu.
Li Mei Fang (リー・メイファン, Ri Meifan)
Voiced by: Mami Koyama
A Chinese woman. At the age of 22, she has a doctorate in medicine and is a commander who leads her units with calm and precise judgment. She is invaded by aliens in episode 23. In the anime Grey, which shares many staff members, anime-original characters Mei and Fang appear as companions to Li from the original manga, and there is a playful twist where the three names are combined to form "Li Mei Fang."
Michael Jansson (マイケル・ヤンソン, Maikeru Yanson)
Voiced by: Keiichi Nanba
An American man. He is in charge of EVA with Susumu, and is a cheerful and reliable older brother figure for him. He is later transferred to the Engineering Bureau.
Joe Kumba (ジョー・クムバ, Jō Kumuba)
Voiced by: Kōzō Shioya
A Congolese man. He is in charge of mechanics and alien language analysis.
Kōji Manaka (マナカ・コウジ, Manaka Kōji)
Voiced by: Yoku Shioya
Bio's developer. A technical genius, he is responsible for the mechanics and operations of the White Pegasus.
Catherine Doyet (カトリーヌ・ドワイエ, Katorīnu Dowaie)
Voiced by: Naho Yoshida
A French woman. Mainly in charge of operations. Develops small Vijur detectors and occasionally enters bodies.
Tetsuya Aramaki (アラマキ・テツヤ, Aramaki Tetsuya)
Voiced by: Ryō Horikawa
An excellent astronaut trainee, but after an incident, he joined the White Pegasus to replace Michael. He is more skilled than Susumu at piloting machines and shooting.

=== HIEU (Vijur aliens) ===
Princess Vijura (ビジュラ姫, Bijura-hime)
Voiced by: Hiromi Tsuru
Under the orders of her father, King Vijur, she takes charge of the exploration of the "life elements," but questions Zudar's policy of insisting on a hard line. She later meets Susumu, goes above ground to stay at Susumu's house, and is astonished to learn that their intrusion is causing severe pain to the human body.
General Bagoo (バグー将軍, Bagū shōgun)
Voiced by: Yuu Shimaka
In charge of the battle against the White Pegasus. After a series of failures, he is ousted, but makes an unexpected appearance in the final episode.
General Zudar (ズダー将軍, Zudā shōgun)
Voiced by: Kaneto Shiozawa
After Bagoo's downfall, he is promoted from second-in-command and seizes full control of the search for the life elements, repeatedly attacking the people of Earth. He also plots to seize control of the planet Vijur, but is finally reconciled and aims for a new future for Vijur. In episode 26, the final episode of the series, he rebels, and after cutting off the communication with regret and realizing that he was in too much of a hurry, he dies muttering, "I was happiest when I was by your side (Princess Vijura)."
Dr. Gabor (ガボー博士, Gabō-hakase)
Voiced by: Masato Hirano
HIEU's technician, responsible for data collection and the development and control of the Medro Monsters.
King Vijur (ビジュール大王, Bijūru daiō)
Voiced by: Daisuke Gōri
The ruler of the planet Vijur (wandering planet "X23"). In order to save his rapidly declining planet, he orders his daughter, Vijura, to search for "life elements." He later comes to Earth. The search for the life elements was done out of love for his planet, and not out of any malicious intent to conquer the Earth or annihilate humanity. He is shot and injured while trying to control the out of control Zudar.
