= Mighty Orbots =

American-Japanese animated television series

- Cover of the Warner Archive DVD Box release.
- Genre: Action-adventure; Science fiction; Comedy; Superhero; Mecha
- Created by: Barry Glasser
- Directed by: Osamu Dezaki
- Music by: Yuji Ohno
- Countries of origin: United States; Japan
- Original language: English
- No. of episodes: 13

Production
- Producers: George Singer; Tatsuo Ikeuchi; Nobuo Inada
- Production companies: MGM/UA Television; TMS Entertainment, Inc. Intermedia Entertainment

Original release
- Network: ABC
- Release: September 8 – December 15, 1984

Mighty Orbots (Japanese: マイティ・オーボッツ, Hepburn: Maiti Ōbottsu) is a 1984 super robot animated series created in a joint collaboration of TMS Entertainment, Inc. and Intermedia Entertainment in association with MGM/UA Television. It was directed by veteran anime director Osamu Dezaki and features character designs by Akio Sugino. The series aired from September 8, 1984, to December 15, 1984, on Saturday mornings in the United States on ABC.

== Series history ==
Mighty Orbots was developed from an idea pitched by Fred Silverman, possibly in response to the popularity of other robot-related properties. The original six-minute "pilot" featured a slightly different version of Mighty Orbots called Broots (pronounced "Brutes"). Rob and Ohno looked similar to their 'finished' selves, though definitively more late 70s-like. The Orbots, while having the same names as in the finished product, are subtly different, and obviously unfinished. Even their combined form aka "Super-Broots" would go through some more developmental evolution before becoming Mighty Orbots. It was produced by Tokyo Movie Shinsha and Intermedia Entertainment in association with MGM/UA Television for both the United States for the television broadcast and Japan via home video. Unlike many other shows of its kind, Mighty Orbots was not simply a translated Japanese import. The series was directed by anime industry veteran Osamu Dezaki with storyboard work by Dezaki's brother Satoshi Dezaki, character designs by Akio Sugino, and animation by Shingo Araki.

The main theme song used in the show introduction and throughout the series was created by Steve Rucker and Thomas Chase, with lead vocals provided by Warren Stanyer. The music was composed by Yuji Ohno.

The series lasted only a single season of thirteen episodes, mostly due to a lawsuit between the show's creators and toymaker Tonka, who accused them of causing brand confusion with their GoBots franchise's "Mighty Robots, Mighty Vehicles" advertising campaign. The episodes aired on ABC and some episodes were later released on VHS by MGM/UA Home Video. Despite its short run, the series has a dedicated fan base today. The series' narration was done by voice-actor Gary Owens, who was the voice of Hanna-Barbera's Space Ghost in the 1960s and Dynomutt, Dog Wonder's human straight man Blue Falcon in the late 1970s.

Mighty Orbots is one of only a small number of Saturday morning cartoons to have a definite series finale: the final episode, "The Invasion of the Shadow Star," ends with a sequence in which the SHADOW homeworld is destroyed and the arch-villain Umbra defeated "once and for all." This differs from most other animated series of the time, where the villain always escaped to fight another day.

== Series plot ==
Earth, the 23rd Century. A time of robots and aliens, and of destruction and terror. Can the Galactic Patrol, defender of the United Planets stop the evil computer, Umbra? You bet they can, meet Rob Simmons the secret inventor of fiesty Ohno, mighty Tor, versatile Bort, elusive Boo, Bo, the master of the elements, and Crunch, the metal muncher, super robots forging together at Rob's command to form Mighty Orbots, champion of the Universe.

— opening narration

The 23rd Century, the future is a time of robots and aliens. The people of Earth have banded together along with several other peaceful alien races to promote peace throughout the galaxy, forming the United Planets. As part of the United Planets, the Galactic Patrol — a body of law-enforcers — works to maintain order, under the leadership of Commander Rondu. However, a powerful criminal organization called SHADOW is out to destroy both the Galactic Patrol and the U.P. Led by Lord Umbra, a massive cyborg-computer, SHADOW employs sinister agents and incredible schemes to attack and someday rule over all corners of the known-galaxy.

Inventor Rob Simmons helps to fight against SHADOW. Simmons is secretly a member of the Galactic Patrol and creates six different robots who can use their unique powers in battle against the forces of Umbra. These robots are capable of uniting to form a giant robot, called Mighty Orbots, to fight for truth, justice, and peace for all.

== Characters ==
=== Hero characters ===
- Rob Simmons – A brilliant inventor and scientist, he is the creator of Mighty Orbots and, as such, is also a secret member of the Galactic Patrol. In general, he poses as a mild-mannered robotics engineer and tinkers in his own laboratory complex (in some unnamed location) on Earth, but when needed, he uses a transformation matrix to change his regular lab clothes – called an Omni-Suit – into the uniform and helmet of his alter-ego, the Orbots Commander. It is by this alternate persona that the rest of the Galactic Patrol knows of him publicly, including Dia. Only Commander Rondu knows that the bespectacled Rob and the heroic Orbots Commander are the same.

Rob has curly blond hair and blue eyes. He can summon the Orbots from their recharge chambers with a remote signal from a device he wears on his wrist. He pilots the Beam Car; a special vehicle that acts as a "command center" when linked up within Mighty Orbots' core body. From there, he and Ohno can operate Mighty Orbots with maximum effectiveness in battle.
Voiced by Barry Gordon (English) and Yū Mizushima (Japanese)

- Commander Rondu – The primary leader of the Galactic Patrol, Rondu is of a race of alien humanoids who somewhat resemble Earth humans (save he has slanted eyes and pointed ears, similar to archetypal fantasy elves; It could also be a reference to the Vulcan species from Star Trek). Rondu is a calm, wise leader and – as it appears throughout the series – has been in charge of the Galactic Patrol for many years. He serves along with his daughter, Dia, who serves as a senior officer. Only Rondu knows about the Orbots Commander's secret identity, as well as the six robots (who apparently also have dual identities as well).

Rondu has long silver-white hair and facial hair, and grey-white eyes. He exhibits formidable psionic powers; something that must be key to his race (since a space pirate named Shrike wanted to use his "unique life-force" to power a super-weapon in the episode "Raid on the Stellar Queen").
Voiced by Don Messick (English) and Shozo Hirabayashi (Japanese)

- Dia Rondu – A senior officer and agent of the Galactic Patrol, Dia serves under her father's command, and is considered one of the "top" agents on the force. She is a good starship pilot and warrior, but occasionally finds herself in jeopardy, needing to be rescued by Mighty Orbots. She has a fascination and apparent love-interest in the Orbots Commander, but doesn't see his alter ego, Rob, as anything more than a good friend and fellow supporter for peace (she is unaware of the fact Rob and the Orbots Commander are the same).

Dia has long, silver-white hair and dark eyes. Aside from being highly skilled in fighting, acrobatics and flying ships, Dia often captures agents of SHADOW in a force-field projector stored in a wrist band on her left arm. It is never said if she possesses the same psionic powers her father does. It is hinted at in "Operation: Eclipse", however, when she volunteers to aid her father in mental battle with Dreneon, who is a member of the same race working for Shadow.
Voiced by Jennifer Darling (English) and Atsuko Koganezawa (Japanese)

=== The Orbots ===
- Ohno Robotti – The first robot of the Orbots so named for her propensity to exclaim "Oh, no!" and quite possibly the leader of the team, Ohno resembles a small, female child in size and demeanor with the "mother hen" personality of a bossy little sister that can often get on the nerves of Rob and the others. Feisty, yet supportive in her role as Rob's assistant, Ohno helps keep the lab running and the rest of the team in line. At times, she feels neglected and unappreciated, but through thick and thin she's always there to lend the team a hand (and a nag when needed).

Ohno's primary colors are pink, red and white. When Mighty Orbots forms its gestalt form, it is Ohno that completes the final circuit "link" that allows the full power of the giant robot form to come online. Without this vital piece, Mighty Orbots cannot become fully functional (a flaw that was exploited once by Umbra under the machinations of the Shadow Agent called Plasmus, in the episode "The Wish World"). If necessary, Ohno can operate the controls alone for basic functions, but combat is simply too demanding without the Commander on board. Ohno also carries the repair tools and recharge kit needed should the Orbots be caught off-world away from their base recharge chambers.
Voiced by Noelle North (English) and Miki Ito (Japanese)

- Tor Robotti – A boastful, burly brute-sized male robot with a voice like Link Hogthrob, he is the strongest of the six team members. Although quite often portrayed as being a bit slow and with a very high opinion of himself, Tor had the ability to think on his feet during battles with SHADOW monsters and henchmen. Kind and supportive towards his friends, although often with a good-naturedly egotistical macho attitude that annoys his female teammates, Tor is the de facto vice leader of the Orbots, especially when Ohno is not leading them directly at the time, but he will take cues from the others when the situation merits it.

Tor's primary colors are silver, red and blue. When forming the gestalt form of Mighty Orbots, Tor retracts his arms and legs into himself to form the central body. At the same time, inside it is protected the head of the Mighty Orbot, which is exchanged when he inserts his original head, along with his arms and legs.
Voiced by Bill Martin (English) and Tessho Genda (Japanese)

- Bort Robotti – A gaunt-thin male robot with a nervous personality and a voice like Lou Costello, he is the one member of the team that is the most handy due to having been built with quick-change circuits and other abilities that allow Bort to reconfigure himself into literally any machine or device he can think of. Often showing a lack of confidence in himself, Bort is portrayed as being clumsy, indecisive and depressive. Yet, when the chips are down, Bort always comes through in the clutch for his team.

Bort's primary colors are silver and blue. When forming the gestalt form of Mighty Orbots, he retracts into a boxy unit that forms the lower right leg. While connected, he can use his quick-change circuits to modify the hands of Mighty Orbots into a variety of offensive and defensive weapons.
Voiced by Jim MacGeorge (English) and Ken Yamaguchi (Japanese)

- Bo Robotti – One of the three female robot team members, she is the most outgoing, assertive and confident female on the team. Sometimes she likes to play practical jokes, but at times they can backfire (like when she removed Crunch's appetite chip, only to have it broken when they needed it in the episode "Trapped on The Prehistoric Planet"). She is a caring soul and will do what she can to support her teammates. She has the ability to manipulate the elements—fire, water, wind, etc.—to use in a myriad of offensive and defensive effects (whirlwinds, water geysers, etc.).

Bo's primary colors are pale yellow and orange. When forming the gestalt form of Mighty Orbots, she transforms to become the left arm, which forms a hand after it is connected to the main body. Through her connection, she can channel her elemental powers throughout the body of Mighty Orbots.
Voiced by Sherry Alberoni (English) and Akari Hibino (Japanese)

- Boo Robotti – The third female team member and twin sister to Bo, she is the shyest member of the team and soft spoken, yet she can prove to be as brave as her twin in combat, even standing up for herself and others (especially when Bo's pranks go too far). Boo has the ability to manipulate light and energy in ways that would appear to be "magic"; she can turn herself and others invisible, create force fields, levitate objects and even teleport. She can also channel energy to form optical illusions and holograms.

Boo's primary colors are white and yellow. When forming the gestalt form of Mighty Orbots, she transforms to become the right arm of the giant robot. Like Bo, she can channel her defensive abilities throughout the larger body, allowing it to benefit from all of her "magic" effects.
Voiced by Julie Bennett (English) and Hitomi Oikawa (Japanese)

- Crunch Robotti – A stoutly robust (sic "chubby") male robot whose personality seems to be focused on one thing; simply put, Crunch loves to eat. His prime ability —coupled with his steel trap-like jaws and teeth —allows him to consume any materials available (metal, stone, glass, circuits, garbage, etc.) and digest it so it can be converted into energy. Often, he's a subject of comic-relief due to his eating habits. Crunch seems simple-minded, but he does prove to have some brains and is a good friend and a steadfast, supportive personality.

Crunch's primary colors are purple and black. When forming the gestalt form of Mighty Orbots, Crunch forms a boxy unit that forms the lower left leg. While connected, Crunch also serves as the back-up power source for the giant robot and, at times, will detach so he can consume any available items to give his team mates a much-needed power boost.
Voiced by Don Messick (English) and Ikuya Sawaki (Japanese)

=== Villain characters ===
- Lord Umbra – The leader of SHADOW, Umbra is an artificial intelligence that is the size of a planet's core; often depicted as a large head with a mouth, a vestigial nose and five eyes. It is through his efforts, organizing through his minions and agents, that Umbra strives to conquer the galaxy. Operating from inside a massive base supercomputer of a sun called the Shadow Star, which essentially has a Dyson sphere, his network of informants and spies keep him abreast of any developments within the United Planets. The weaponry and defensive systems of the Shadow Star are so ominous that a direct assault by Galactic Patrol forces is considered to be out of the question. The Shadow Star can generate so much power that it is able to move under Umbra's direction, and any sector of space it occupies will be totally under Shadow control.

Umbra himself has no real means of directly fighting his enemies, so he employs massive monsters, sinister aliens and elaborate plans to combat the threat of the Galactic Patrol and Mighty Orbots.

- Draconis the Tobor Commander – An agent of SHADOW, who works with Umbra in a diabolical plan to discredit and defeat the Orbots. He works with a duplicate, giant robot impostor, named Mighty Tobor, who resembles the assembled gestalt form of Mighty Orbots. Together, they first attack the peaceful peoples of the galaxy to make the Galactic Patrol believe that the Orbots have turned evil. Then, after the Orbots are put on trial and sentenced to 'life' on the Great Prison Planet, Draconis – who had managed to infiltrate the prison and put himself as the chief warden – would put the Orbots through grueling, demeaning and deadly tasks that would have destroyed them. However, Draconis and Tobor were exposed, and eventually defeated by Dia and the Orbots.
- Captain Shrike – The leader of a gang of space pirates, Captain Shrike lashes out against unsuspecting ships and travelers from within the Sargasso Star Cluster; wherein lies his secret base. He battled Mighty Orbots after he hijacked a starliner, the Stellar-Queen, to use her hyperdrive engine along with the life-force of Commander Rondu to create a super weapon.

Shrike uses a cybernetic eye to control his Master Computer, as well as stun his foes with a stasis-ray. Using his Master Computer, Shrike used Rondu's life-force to create a creature called a Titan (which looked like a Japanese Oni), to battle Mighty Orbots.
Shrike was the only villain who was not a member of SHADOW.

- Plasmus – An alien shape-shifter, Plasmus was ordered by Umbra to find a weakness in Mighty Orbots so SHADOW could destroy them. Plasmus discovered that Ohno was a key to Mighty Orbots power, after he tricked her into traveling to the Wish World, where she was turned into a human girl. Plasmus later battled Mighty Orbots in the Emerald Nebula, in an attempt to defeat them, but was shoved into a hyper-warp and was never seen again.

Plasmus could change his shape to resemble any type of non-robotic life form. He mostly traveled as a mass of gaseous, green/white vapor, which is what appeared as he transformed. As well, he could draw upon energy and matter to enlarge his strength and mass exponentially.

== Episodes ==
No.	Title	Written by	Original release date
1	"Magnetic Menace"	Michael Reaves & Kimmer Ringwald	September 8, 1984
Bo and Boo go to see rock star robots Dragos and Drax in concert, unaware that they're SHADOW agents.
2	"The Wish World"	Michael Reaves	September 15, 1984
Ohno worries that Rob doesn't appreciate her because she's a robot and travels to the Wishworld to become human.
3	"Trapped on the Prehistoric Planet"	Marc Scott Zicree	September 22, 1984
SHADOW agent Mentallus lures the team to a world populated by deadly monsters.
4	"The Dremloks"	Michael Reaves	September 29, 1984
SHADOW take over the minds of a race of Ewok-like aliens.
5	"Devil's Asteroid"	Buzz Dixon	October 6, 1984
Mighty Orbots are framed as rampaging menaces and sent to the prison Devil's Asteroid for 999 years of hard labor.
6	"Raid on the Stellar Queen"	Marc Scott Zicree	October 13, 1984
The luxury space liner The Stellar Queen is captured by pirates while Bort struggles with feeling useless on the team.
7	"The Jewel of Targon"	David Wise	October 20, 1984
While on patrol, Bo, Bort and Crunch find a beautiful gem and Bo decides to take it home to Earth, unaware of its deadly secret.
8	"The Phoenix Factor"	Donald F. Glut & Douglas Booth	October 27, 1984
A number of machines, including Ohno, are infected with a virus that makes them run amok.
9	"Leviathan"	David Wise	November 3, 1984
SHADOW has taken control of a massive whale named Leviathan in order to steal the Solar Sphere from its underwater tomb.
10	"The Cosmic Circus"	Donald F. Glut & Douglas Booth	November 17, 1984
The Orbots infiltrate a circus used by Umbra.
11	"A Tale of Two Thieves"	Buzz Dixon	November 24, 1984
Crunch befriends a young boy (The Kid) unaware that the child is working with a thief (Klepto) that stole the Proteus Pod with plans to sell it to SHADOW.
12	"Operation Eclipse"	Marc Scott Zicree	December 1, 1984
Rondu's old friend Drennen meets the Orbots, and claims to have a way to stop Umbra. But does he have an ulterior motive?
13	"The Invasion of the Shadow Star"	Michael Reaves	December 15, 1984
The Orbots come across blueprints of another robotic team, and fear they're being replaced. They decide to fight Umbra on their own, at the risk of their own lives.

== Video releases ==
Victor Entertainment released the series in Japan via home video. On April 17, 2018, Warner Bros. Home Entertainment released the series on DVD via their Warner Archive Collection label (via Turner Entertainment Co., the owner of the pre-May 1986 MGM library) in North America.
