= Mahjong Hishō-den: Naki no Ryū =

Japanese mahjong-themed manga series

- Ryū: Naki no Ryū Yori video game cover art (X68000)

哭きの竜 麻雀飛翔伝
- Genre: Gambling
- Manga
- Written by: Junichi Nojo
- Published by: Takeshobo
- Magazine: Bessatsu Kindai Mahjong
- Original run: 1985 – 1990
- Volumes: 9
Further information
Original video animation
Directed by	Satoshi Dezaki
Written by	Hiroyuki Yamaga; Kazumi Koide; Satoshi Dezaki
Studio	Gainax; Magic Bus
Released	May 25, 1988 – July 27, 1990
Runtime	45 minutes
Episodes	3
Original video animation
Naki no Ryuu: Hiryuu no Shou
Directed by	Satoshi Dezaki
Produced by	Toshiba EMI
Written by	Hiroyuki Yamaga; Junichi Noujou
Studio	Gainax; Magic Bus
Released	August 23, 1991
Runtime	46 minutes
Live-action film
Mahjong Hisho Den: Naki no Ryu
Released	June 17, 1995
Runtime	95 minutes

Mahjong Hishō-den: Naki no Ryū (麻雀飛翔伝 哭きの竜; "Mahjong Soaring Tale: Sobbing Ryū") is a Japanese mahjong-themed manga series written and illustrated by Junichi Nojo. It was serialized in Takeshobo's Bessatsu Kindai Mahjong between 1985 and 1990. It was adapted into a three-episode original video animation (OVA) between 1988 and 1990.

It was also adapted into four video games, released between 1990 and 1995.

== Video games ==
- Ryū: Naki no Ryū Yori (June 28, 1990, PC-98, published by Wolf Team)
- Ryū: Naki no Ryū Yori (February 15, 1991, X68000, published by Wolf Team)
- Naki no Ryū: Mahjong Hishō-den (December 25, 1992, Super Famicom, published by IGS)
- Mahjong Hishō-den: Shin Naki no Ryū (October 27, 1995, Super Famicom, published by Bec)

== See also ==
- Gambling in Japan
