= Love (manga) =

Japanese manga series

- LOVe
- Cover of volume 1 of LOVe

ラブ (Rabu)
- Genre: Sports
- Manga
- Written by: Osamu Ishiwata
- Published by: Shogakukan
- Magazine: Weekly Shōnen Sunday
- Original run: August 18, 1993 – February 17, 1999
- Volumes: 30

Love (Japanese: ラブ, Hepburn: Rabu) (stylized as LOVe) is a Japanese manga series written and illustrated by Osamu Ishiwata. It was serialized in Shogakukan's Weekly Shōnen Sunday from August 1993 to February 1999. Its chapters were collected in thirty tankōbon volumes.

== Manga ==
Love is written and illustrated by Osamu Ishiwata, and is the continuation of the story from B.B., an earlier manga of Ishiwata's. Love started in the combined 1993 35th–36th issue of Shogakukan's Weekly Shōnen Sunday on August 18, 1993, and finished in the 1999 10th issue of the magazine on February 17, 1999. The series was collected into thirty tankōbon volumes published by Shogakukan, released from April 18, 1994, to March 18, 1999.

=== Volume list ===
No.	Japanese release date	Japanese ISBN
1	April 18, 1994	978-4-09-123341-7
2	May 18, 1994	978-4-09-123342-4
3	July 18, 1994	978-4-09-123343-1
4	September 17, 1994	978-4-09-123344-8
5	October 18, 1994	978-4-09-123345-5
6	December 10, 1994	978-4-09-123346-2
7	March 18, 1995	978-4-09-123347-9
8	May 18, 1995	978-4-09-123348-6
9	July 18, 1995	978-4-09-123349-3
10	October 18, 1995	978-4-09-123350-9
11	December 9, 1995	978-4-09-123671-5
12	February 17, 1996	978-4-09-123672-2
13	May 18, 1996	978-4-09-123673-9
14	July 18, 1996	978-4-09-123674-6
15	October 18, 1996	978-4-09-123675-3
16	December 10, 1996	978-4-09-123676-0
17	December 10, 1996	978-4-09-123677-7
18	May 17, 1997	978-4-09-123678-4
19	July 18, 1997	978-4-09-123679-1
20	September 18, 1997	978-4-09-123680-7
21	November 18, 1997	978-4-09-125321-7
22	January 17, 1998	978-4-09-125322-4
23	March 18, 1998	978-4-09-125323-1
24	May 18, 1998	978-4-09-125324-8
25	July 18, 1998	978-4-09-125325-5
26	September 18, 1998	978-4-09-125326-2
27	September 18, 1998	978-4-09-125327-9
28	January 18, 1999	978-4-09-125328-6
29	February 18, 1999	978-4-09-125329-3
30	March 18, 1999	978-4-09-125330-9
