= Big Wars =

- North American DVD Cover of Big Wars
- Directed by: Toshifumi Takizawa (Note: Credited as Chief Director.); Issei Kume
- Written by: Kazumi Koide
- Based on: Big Wars by Yoshio Aramaki
- Produced by: Yukio Kikukawa; Tetsu Dezaki
- Edited by: Naotoshi Ogata; Yukiko Itō; Satoshi Terauchi
- Music by: Michiaki Katō
- Production company: Magic Bus
- Distributed by: Central Park Media
- Release date: September 25, 1993
- Running time: 75 minutes
- Country: Japan
- Language: Japanese

Big Wars: Red Zone, Divine Annihilation (ビッグ・ウォーズ 神撃つ朱き荒野に, Biggu Wōzu: Kami Utsu Akaki Kōya ni) is a 1993 Japanese science fiction anime film based on the novel of the same name by Yoshio Aramaki. It was released in the United States by Central Park Media.

== Plot ==
Set in the dawning of the 25th century, the earth has undergone changes and technology improved in leaps and bounds, with humanity now colonizing Mars. However, unknown to humanity, there is an ancient race of aliens known as 'The Gods' which have been patiently waiting and watching humanity's progress. They take action and try to halt man's progress into space with extreme force. Although humanity has some very advanced weaponry at their disposal such as highly advanced aircraft, orbital fighters and gigantic desert battleships full of the most amazing array of weapons, will it be enough to stop them? The aliens have impressive weapons of their own, including an unstoppable stealth carrier. Humanity's hope rests on the shoulders of Captain Akuh and the crew of the Battleship Aoba. They are to carry out a top-secret mission against the aliens which, if successful, could mean the end to the war.

== Cast ==
=== Japanese Cast ===
- Hideyuki Tanaka as Captain Akuh
- Isshin Chiba as Operator
- Kouji Tsujitani as J. Dalton
- Yumi Touma as Dr. Lee
- Hiroko Emori as Lt. Darsa Keligan
- Yuzuru Fujimoto as Admiral Mikawa
- Shinya Ohtaki as Yutaka Todoroki
- Ikuya Sawaki as Colonel Coleman
- Masaru Satou as John Bruce
- Hirohiko Kakegawa as Yamamoto
- Sanshiro Nitta as P.O.
- Omi Minami as Announcer
- Michiko Neya as Yoko Dalton

=== English Dub Cast ===
- B.H. O'Neill as Captain Akuh
- Cynthia DeMoss as Dr. Lee
- Dale Oliverio as Takeshi Hijikata
- David Stuart as J. Dalton
- Michael William as Yutaka Todoroki
- Sharon Becker as Lt. Darsa Keligan
- Barry Chiate as Colonel Coleman
- Bob Heitman as Admiral Mikawa
