= Dragoon (OVA) =

1997 Japanese original video animation series

竜機伝承 (Ryūki Denshō)
- Genre: Adventure, fantasy
- Original video animation
- Directed by: Kenichi Maejima
- Produced by: Kazumi Koide; Tobuto Dezaki
- Studio: Magic Bus
- Licensed by: ADV Films
- Released: July 25, 1997
- Runtime: 30 minutes per episode
- Episodes: 3

Dragoon known in Japan as (竜機伝承 (Ryūki Denshō, lit. Dragon Machine Lore)) is a 1997 three-episode Japanese original video animation (OVA) series produced by Magic Bus and released by KSS. It is an adaptation of the tactical role-playing video game franchise of the same name developed by KSS. The series was licensed for an English-language release in North America by ADV Films, who distributed it on VHS format in 2000.

== Plot ==
The narrative focuses on Myuu, a mysterious girl who serves as the biological key to unlocking an ancient, devastating weapon of mass destruction known as the "Dragoon." Controlled and experimented upon within the militaristic Garubado Empire, Myuu escapes from her containment facility and flees into a nearby forest.

While practicing his swordsmanship, a traveling warrior-in-training named Sedi discovers Myuu lying unconscious in the snow. Sedi protects her from the searching imperial tracking squads by masking their trail through a frozen stream. Upon bringing her back to his local village, Sedi discovers that Myuu is suffering from total amnesia and retains no memory of her identity or her latent mystical connection to the machine weapon. Sedi subsequently vows to aid Myuu in recovering her identity while evading imperial recapture.

== Characters ==
Raymond Caliver (レイモンド, Reimondo)
Voiced by: Takayuki Sugō (Japanese); Ken Webster (English)
The late father of the main protagonist, Sedi, and his younger sister, Milli. Long before the events of the anime, Raymond was a legendary, renowned warrior who commanded a powerful order of knights fiercely resisting the southern Garubado Empire's attempt to expand into his homeland, Fairoud Kingdom. Raymond was killed in a legendary, life-or-death duel with his ultimate arch-enemy, the "Mad Knight in Black," Bashua. Though Raymond died before the start of the story, his legacy drives the plot. He bequeathed his legendary sword, "Raikō no Aria" (Aria of Lightning / Lightning Aria), to Sedi. This sword acts as a central plot device, drawing the immediate interest of the wandering prince Rein and serving as a direct symbol of Sedi's destiny to thwart the Empire's plans.
Sedi Caliver (セディ, Sedī) / Sedon
Voiced by: Akira Ishida (Japanese); Jay Sefton (English)
Sedon is a determined, kind-hearted, and courageous swordsman-in-training who lives in a secluded winter cabin left behind by his deceased father, the legendary knight commander Raymond Caliver. Sedi's character arc centers around his transition from an inexperienced "apprentice hero" into a legendary warrior. Guided by his vow to protect the amnesiac girl May, he fights directly against the tyrannical Garubado Empire while coming to grips with his family's bloodline and martial legacy. The sword his father bequeathed to him serves as his defining visual anchor, cementing his fate to protect the Fairoud Kingdom and instantly attracting the attention of key allies like Prince Rein.
Myuu (ミュー, Myū) / May
Voiced by: Mariko Kouda (Japanese); Bina Kumari Chauhan (English)
The renegade product of a highly classified imperial bio-engineering experiment orchestrated by the Garubado Empire, May escapes from the imperial laboratory facility where she was kept. While running blindly through the nearby woods, she collapses. Meanwhile, Sedi is out in the snow practicing his sword techniques. Hearing approaching imperial military aircraft and a ground search party, Sedi hides behind a row of bushes. As he tries stealthily shadow the soldiers, he trips over May, lying naked and unconscious in the snow. Sedi wraps her up and carries her back to his fsmall log cabin. May awakens with complete amnesia and can only remember her name, prompting Sedi to vow to protect her and help find her identity. Her latent spiritual powers and genetic makeup hold the unique biological "key" required to awaken, interface with, and pilot the "Dragoon"—an ancient, highly destructive living mechanical war weapon. Despite her fragile appearance, her dormant powers erupt into destructive energy whenever she or her friends are in extreme, life-threatening danger, making her the primary target of the Empire's elite forces throughout the entire three-episode series.
Millie Caliver (ミリィ, Mirī)
Voiced by: Yūko Miyamura (Japanese); Jessica Schwartz (English)
Sedi's energetic younger sister. Entirely driven by her fiercely loyal heart, she brings a much-needed warmth and lightheartedness to a story otherwise driven by war, amnesia, and dark military conspiracies. Knowing the dangers ahead, she tracks down her brother to join him and Myuu on their journey to become the energetic emotional center of the protagonist group. Despite lacking the specialized combat training of her older brother or the heavy magic of her companions, she possesses immense courage. This is proven when she completely ignores the immense danger of the Garubado Empire to pursue Sedi and ensure he is not traveling alone. Her free-spirited nature leads her to strike up a chance friendship with the traveling drifter, Rein. Milli's sharp intuition allows her to see right through Rein's flirtatious, shallow playboy persona. By drawing Rein into the group's orbit, she inadvertently facilitates the critical intersection between Sedi's heirloom sword (Raikō no Aria) and the royal house of the Fairoud Kingdom, effectively driving the party's recruitment of its most powerful royal ally.
Rain Keeves Fearudo (レイン, Rein) / Prince Layne
Voiced by: Toshihiko Seki (Japanese); Gray G. Haddock (English)
Prince Layne is the carefree prince of the Fairoud Kingdom who disguises himself as a wandering drifter. He crosses paths with the main party and immediately takes an interest in the legendary sword Sedi carries. Though he initially comes off as a flirtatious and shallow "playboy" (nanpa), he is a highly dependable ally who uses masterful spear skills learned from his father to assist the heroes in times of crisis.
Lilith (リリス, Ririsu)
Voiced by: Yuka Imai (Japanese); Jana Brockman (English)
Lilith is a powerful, red-haired sorceress (ma dōshi) operating out of the port town of Vooit (Novele). She meets Sedi when she tries to swindle him out of his money with rigged playing cards. However she reveals her true colors as a highly capable and protective ally in the face of a sudden Garubado Empire attack when she uses her master-level fire magic (guren no honō) to blast through the enemy forces and rescue Sedi and Miu.
Bubb (バブ, Babu)
Voiced by: Mie Sonozaki (Japanese); Boni Hester (English)
Bubb is a street urchin and thief who is Lilith's loyal companion and partner in crime. He lives and operates with Lilith in the port town of Vooit, often helping her run her gambling and card scams. When the Garubado Empire forces invade the city, Babu uses his sharp wits, street smarts, and thieving skills to help Sedi, Miu, and Lilith bypass local defenses by acting as their guide and hotwiring and stealing an imperial airship to help them escape the Imperial blockade.
Bashua (バシュア)
Voiced by: Akio Ōtsuka (Japanese); Adam Dudley (English)
Bashua is a legendary, heavily armored warrior known as the "Mad Knight in Black" (Kokui no Kyōkishi) and the lifelong arch-rival and mortal enemy to Sedi's late father. He is an elite mercenary and honorary knight for the Garubado Empire. Despite his massive, hulking physique, he wields a colossal sword with terrifying, blinding speed and seamlessly combines his physical strikes with high-level destructive magic. He is Sedi main antagonist and their ultimate confrontation serves as the emotional catalyst that triggers the hidden, sealed power dormant inside the amnesiac girl, Myuu.
Professor Gabrielle (ガブリエル, Gaburieru)
Voiced by: Shōzō Iizuka (Japanese); John Paul Shepard (English)
Professor Gabrielle) is a brilliant, senior scientist and primary researcher employed by the militaristic Garubado Empire. He serves as the lead scholar in charge of excavating, analyzing, and attempting to reactivate the ancient, legendary bio-mechanical weapon known as the "Dragoon." Because his work relies heavily on unlocking lost technologies, he is deeply invested in capturing the amnesiac girl, Miu, whose hidden memories and latent powers hold the literal key to bringing the slumbering weapon back to life.
Randy (ランディ, Randi)
Voiced by: Takehito Koyasu (Japanese); Bill Wise (English)
Randy is an Imperial military officer and tactical commander of Garubado Empire operating under the direction of Professor Gabriel. Cold, precise, and deeply loyal to the expansionist goals of the Empire, he repeatedly spearheads the tactical military units dispatched across the continent to hunt down Myuu and her allies.

== Media ==
=== Anime ===
The three-episode original video animation series was animated by the studio Magic Bus, with direction handled by Kenichi Maejima and production overseen by Kazumi Koide and Tobuto Dezaki. The original home video episodes were published and distributed in Japan by KSS across a staggered release schedule starting July 25, 1997, and concluding on November 28, 1997.

In North America, the series was licensed by A.D. Vision and released under the title Dragoon as an English-dubbed-only single-volume release on VHS home video formats in 2000. The English local production was executive produced by ADV co-founder John Ledford and directed by Gary Dehan.

=== Episode list ===
Ep.	Title	Original release date
1	"The Awakening (覚醒, Kakusei)"	July 25, 1997
2	"The Conflict (相剋, Sōkoku)"	September 26, 1997
3	"The Decisive Battle (決戦, Kessen)"	November 28, 1997
