= Mad Bull 34 =

Japanese manga series

- First tankōbon volume cover

マッド★ブル34 (Maddo Buru Sanjūyon)
- Genre: Action; Comedy
- Manga
- Written by: Kazuo Koike
- Illustrated by: Noriyoshi Inoue
- Published by: Shueisha; Studio Ship
- English publisher: NA: Renta! (digital)
- Magazine: Weekly Young Jump
- Original run: July 1985 – January 1991
- Volumes: 19 (Shueisha); 27 (Studio Ship)
- Original video animation
- Directed by: Satoshi Dezaki
- Written by: Toshiaki Imaizumi (1); Kazumi Koide (2–4)
- Music by: John Michael; Curio (1)
- Studio: Magic Bus
- Licensed by: NA: Discotek Media (former)
- Released: December 21, 1990 – August 21, 1992
- Runtime: 45 minutes
- Episodes: 4
- Manga

Mad Bull 2000
- Written by: Kazuo Koike
- Illustrated by: Noriyoshi Inoue
- Published by: Shueisha
- Magazine: Manga Allman
- Original run: April 1999 – September 2001
- Volumes: 7
- icon

Mad Bull 34 (Japanese: マッド★ブル34, Hepburn: Maddo Buru Sanjūyon) is a Japanese manga series written by Kazuo Koike and illustrated by Noriyoshi Inoue. It was serialized in Shueisha's seinen manga magazine Weekly Young Jump between 1985 and 1991; Shueisha collected its chapters in 19 tankōbon volumes and later Studio Ship published it in 27 volumes. The series follows the violent exploits of the toughest cop in the NYPD's 34th Precinct, "Sleepy" John Estes—known to his enemies as "Mad Bull"—and his partners, Daizaburo "Eddie" Ban and Perrine Valley.

A four-episode original video animation (OVA) adaptation was released from 1990 to 1992. A sequel manga, Mad Bull 2000, was serialized in Shueisha's Manga Allman magazine from 1999 to 2001, with its chapters collected in seven volumes.

The OVA was licensed in English by Manga Entertainment and released on VHS in 1996. Discotek Media re-released it on DVD in 2013.

== Plot ==
After graduating from the New York City Police Academy, Japanese American NYPD rookie Daizaburo "Eddie" Ban is assigned to the 34th Precinct, which has the highest crime rate in Manhattan. There, he is paired with Afro-Puerto Rican cop John Estes, who is nicknamed "Sleepy" by his friends but is notoriously known as "Mad Bull" by criminals due to his violent behavior. He has no qualms about firing a shotgun at minor threats and executing petty thieves. He also skims money off prostitutes and often causes enormous damage to the city while cracking down on crime. At first, Daizaburou is reluctant to pair up with Sleepy because of his uncooperative behavior, but as their partnership continues, their relationship changes. Sleepy's actions are outrageous and illegal, but he always has the right motives (for example, he uses the money he skims off prostitutes to support venereal disease clinics and domestic violence shelters). As the pair become famous in the 34th Precinct, police lieutenant Perrine Valley joins them as they face more difficult cases involving the mafia and drug-running.

== Characters ==
"Sleepy" John Estes / "Mad Bull"
Voiced by: Akio Ōtsuka (Japanese); Allan Wenger (English)
An Afro-Puerto Rican police officer who is nicknamed "Mad Bull" due to his large size and violent behavior. He runs a prostitution ring in the 34th Precinct which makes him a target for other gang bosses wanting to take over the territory. Sleepy interprets the law in ways that are convenient for him, and kills criminals with little regard for legality, but is infinitely kind to the weak. As a teenager, his family was murdered by gangsters, and since then, he made it his mission to kill every gang boss in New York and eliminate organized crime. His name is a reference to blues guitarist Sleepy John Estes.
Daizaburo "Eddie" Ban
Voiced by: Yasunori Matsumoto (Japanese); Alan Marriott (English)
A Japanese American rookie police officer who is Sleepy's partner. He is extremely earnest and often exasperated by Sleepy's unlawful methods, but becomes more agreeable with him throughout their partnership. In the beginning of the manga, Daizaburo is used mostly as comic relief, but later on this role is transferred to Sleepy as his antics become more and more absurd. Daizaburo quickly falls in love with Lieutenant Perrine Valley.
Perrine Valley
Voiced by: Gara Takashima (Japanese); Liza Ross (English)
A lieutenant of the 34th Precinct, she helps Sleepy and Daizaburo on some of the more difficult missions. She eventually marries Daizaburo, first in a scheme concocted by Sleepy in an effort to bring a critically injured Daizaburo out of a coma. Later, she, Daizaburo, and Sleepy are kidnapped by cowboy assassins and are remarried after the previous marriage was presumably annulled. Her name is a reference to American actress Valerie Perrine.
Chief Alan
Voiced by: Takkou Ishimori (Japanese); Jesse Vogel (English)
The chief of the 34th Precinct. He and Sleepy often butt heads due to Sleepy's "creative" police work. Chief Alan often fantasizes about Sleepy being murdered because of all the trouble he causes him.
Nickels the Electrician
Voiced by: Mitsuo Senda (Japanese); Garrick Hagon (English)
An inventor with a vendetta against Mad Bull who has ties with the New York underworld. Develops bizarre yet deadly devices ranging from guns built into hard hats to shotguns that strap onto cats. A diabetic addicted to canned coffee that has a particular odor that smells like a mix of sugar and urine. Although his name is romanized in the manga as 'Nickels', his name could be translated as 'Nichols', perhaps a reference to actor Jack Nicholson who the character closely resembles. In the English dub of the anime, he is renamed "Nickels the Mechanic".

== Media ==
=== Manga ===
Written by Kazuo Koike and illustrated by Noriyoshi Inoue, Mad Bull 34 was serialized in Shueisha's seinen manga magazine Weekly Young Jump from July 1985 to January 1991. Shueisha collected its chapters in 19 tankōbon volumes released from June 1, 1986, to December 1, 1990; Studio Ship would later publish the series in 27 volumes from June 20, 1993, to July 20, 1994.

A sequel, titled Mad Bull 2000 (マッド・ブル 2000), was serialized in Shueisha's Manga Allman magazine from April 1999 to September 2001. Shueisha collected its chapters in seven tankōbon volumes, released from October 19, 1999, to February 19, 2002.

Renta! published the first volume digitally in English in August 2014.

=== Original video animation ===
A four-episode original video animation (OVA) by Magic Bus and directed by Satoshi Dezaki, was released from December 21, 1990, to August 21, 1992.

Manga Entertainment released the series with an English dub on four VHS sets from March 19 to September 24, 1996. Discotek Media announced that they had licensed the OVA in June 2012 and released it on DVD on February 26, 2013. In December 2020, Discotek Media stated that they no longer hold the license for the OVA.

==== Episodes ====
- "Scandal" / "Hit and Rape"
- "Manhattan Connection"
- "City of Vice" / "Charging Jackie"
- "Cop Killer" / "Good-By Sleepy"
