= Garasu no Usagi =

- First edition
- Author: Toshiko Takagi
- Original title: ガラスのうさぎ
- Language: Japanese
- Genre: autobiographical novel
- Published: 1977
- Publisher: 金の星社
- Publication place: Japan

Garasu no Usagi (ガラスのうさぎ; The Glass Rabbit) is a Japanese autobiographical novel by Toshiko Takagi(June 19, 1932 - August 8, 2026), who lost her sister and mother in the Great Tokyo Air Raid and saw her father killed by P-51 Mustang before her eyes at Ninomiya Station when she was 13 years old. As of 2018, the original novel has sold more than 2.4 million copies in Japan. It was translated into German, Spanish, Hungarian and other languages. It was adapted into a live-action film in 1979, a television drama series in 1980 and an anime film in 2005.

== Adaptations ==
=== Live-action film ===
The live action film, titled Tokyo Air Raid Glass Rabbit (東京大空襲 ガラスのうさぎ), is directed by Yūten Tachibana and was released on July 14, 1979.

=== TV series ===
The television drama series has 15 episodes and was broadcast on NHK from August 18 to September 5, 1980.

=== Anime film ===
Glass no Usagi
- Directed by: Setsuko Shibuichi
- Written by: Kazumi Koide; Mitsuyo Suenaga
- Screenplay by: Kazumi Koide; Mitsuyo Suenaga
- Based on: Garasu no Usagi by Toshiko Takagi
- Edited by: Shigenari Nishi
- Music by: Michiru Ōshima
- Production company: Magic Bus
- Release date: May 14, 2008 (Japan)
- Running time: 84 minutes
- Country: Japan
- Language: Japanese

The anime film is directed by Setsuko Shibuichi, animated at Magic Bus, and was released on May 14, 2005.
