= Sword for Truth =

Japanese OVA

- Genre: Chanbara
- Original video animation
- Directed by: Osamu Dezaki (uncredited)
- Produced by: Hiroshi Matsuzono; Naoko Takahashi; Noriaki Ikeda; Tetsu Dezaki; Takeshi Tamiya
- Written by: Takeshi Narumi
- Music by: Toshiyuki Watanabe
- Studio: Toei Animation; Magic Bus
- Licensed by: NA / UK: Manga Entertainment
- Released: December 28, 1990
- Runtime: 49 minutes

Sword for Truth (修羅之介斬魔剣死鎌紋の男, Shuranosuke Zanmaken-shi kama mon no otoko; lit. 'Shuranosuke the Demon: Man of the Death Scythes Crest') is a 1990 OVA chanbara film directed by an uncredited Osamu Dezaki, who was credited as storyboard artist under the alias "Tsutomu Dezaki". The film is based on a series of novels by Takeshi Narumi.

Sword for Truth was released to a largely negative reception in the United Kingdom and the United States, where it was marketed by Manga Entertainment in lieu of their successful release of Ninja Scroll.

== Plot ==
Shuranosuke Sakaki, a ronin who wears the mark of two crossed scythes, is hired by the Nakura Clan to rescue Princess Mayu from the Seki Ninja. During his quest, he faces the Seki Ninja's deadliest assassins as he attempts to rescue her. Meanwhile, Marouji, an assassin who kills his targets with his jujutsu skills also carries out his own missions. Sakaki succeeds in rescuing Princess Mayu, but on their return, Lord Daizen orders the execution of Sakaki to hide his involvement with the princess. However, Princess Mayu stops the execution before she suddenly collapses, coughing up blood after being poisoned by the Seki Ninja. Sakaki refuses his reward and leaves the Nakura Clan in disgust. Later, Sakaki crosses paths with the assassin Marouji, both with the strong smell of blood about them.

== Cast ==
Character	Japanese	English (CTV Studios/Manga UK, 1998)
Shuranosuke Sakaki	Kazuhiko Inoue	Eric Flynn
Princess Mayu	Rei Sakuma	Julia Brahms
Maroji	Tesshô Genda	Frank Rozelaar-Green
Daizen Imura	Kazuhiko Kishino	Garrick Hagen
Gunbei Tashiro	Masashi Sugawara	Alan Blyton
Kagero	Ginzô Matsuo	Alan Blyton
Oren	Run Sasaki	Sarah Wateridge
Okuni	Toshiko Fujita	Lesley Rooney
Narrator	Kiyoshi Kobayashi	Peter Marinker
