= Carol: A Day in a Girl's Life =

1990 original video animation

Carol: A Day in a Girl's Life 1991

Studio album by TM Network
- Released: December 9, 1988
- Genres: New wave; progressive pop
- Label: Epic Records

TM Network chronology
Humansystem (1987)	Carol: A Day in a Girl's Life 1991 (1988)	Rhythm Red (1990)

Carol: A Day in a Girl's Life is the 6th album by Japanese rock band TM Network, released on December 9, 1988, under Epic Records.

== Other media ==
- Carol

キャロル (Kyaroru)
- Novel
- Written by: Naoto Kine
- Published by: Sony
- Published: April 1989
- Original video animation
- Directed by: Satoshi Dezaki; Tsuneo Tominaga
- Produced by: Naoto Kine
- Music by: Tetsuya Komuro
- Studio: Magic Bus; Animate Film
- Released: March 21, 1990
- Runtime: 60 minutes
- icon

=== Book ===
Carol is a novel written by Naoto Kine, one of a member of TM Network on 1989 April 15.

=== Anime ===
Carol is an anime OVA featuring character designs by Yun Kōga and Toshiki Yoshida, based on a story by Naoto Kine. It was the biggest selling anime video of the year in Japan.

==== Plot ====
Carol was born in a family revolving around music, since she is the daughter of famous musician Lionel Mudagolas. She realizes that something unusual is happening to the world, as her father is having a harder time playing his cello and also her favorite band is unable to perform as they did before. She is teleported into a world connected to hers to fight a demon lord called Gigantica. Fighting alongside her are three heroes who have been awaiting Carol eagerly.

==== Cast ====
Japanese voice actor

- Aya Hisakawa as Carol Mue Douglas
- Takashi Utsunomiya as Flash
- Nobuo Tobita as Tico Brani
- Kaneto Shiozawa as Clark Maxwell
- Show Hayami as Quepri
- Hideyuki Tanaka as Ryman Mue Douglas
- Mika Doi as Reet
- Masaru Ikeda as Tios
- Eiko Yamada as Domos
- Tomoko Maruo as Alice
- Kazue Ikura as Eddie
- Masashi Hirose as U4
- Sakiko Tamagawa as Fairy
- Miki Itō as Therese
- Michitaka Kobayashi as Rydah

==== Theme music ====
"Just One Victory"

  - Lyrics, Composition Arrangement: Tetsuya Komuro
  - Artist: TM Network

== See also ==
- 1988 in Japanese music
