= Osamu Dezaki =

Japanese film director and screenwriter (1943–2011)

- Born: November 18, 1943; Shinagawa, Tokyo
- Died: April 17, 2011 (aged 67)
- Occupations: Director, animator, screenwriter
- Years active: 1963–2011
- Relatives: Satoshi Dezaki (brother)

Osamu Dezaki (出﨑 統, Dezaki Osamu; November 18, 1943 – April 17, 2011), also known as Makura Saki (崎枕, Saki Makura), Kan Matsudo (松戸完, Matsudo Kan), Toru Yabuki (矢吹徹, Yabuki Toru) or Kuyou Sai (斉九洋, Sai Kuyou), was a Japanese anime director and screenwriter.

== Biography ==
Dezaki started out as a manga artist while still in high school. In 1963 he joined Mushi Production, which was founded by manga and anime pioneer Osamu Tezuka. He made his debut as a director in 1970 with Ashita no Joe.

After working with Mushi Production, Dezaki co-founded Madhouse with Masao Maruyama, Rintaro, and Yoshiaki Kawajiri.

Dezaki was known for his distinct visual style, which makes use of split screen, stark lighting, extensive use of dutch angle, and pastel freeze frames that he called "postcard memories", which may be his most famous trademark. They feature a process whereby the screen fades into a detailed "painting" of the simpler original animation. Many of his techniques became popular and came to be seen as special techniques of Japanese animation. He particularly influenced Yoshiaki Kawajiri, Yoshiyuki Tomino, Ryūtarō Nakamura, Noriyuki Abe, Kunihiko Ikuhara, Akiyuki Shinbo, and Yutaka Yamamoto.

His older brother, Satoshi Dezaki, is also an anime director.

Dezaki was a notorious chain smoker, and as a result, he died from lung cancer on April 17, 2011, at the age of 67.

== Works ==
=== Television series ===
Title	Position	Year
Astro Boy	Animator and Episode Director	1963–1966
Big X	Animator and Episode Director	1964–1965
Gokū no Daibōken (Based on Journey to the West)	Episode Director	1967
Naughty Detective Corps	Episode Director	1968
Dororo	Episode Director	1969
Moomin	Episode Director	1969
Ashita no Joe	Director, Screenplay, and Episode Director	1970–1971
Lupin the 3rd Part I	Storyboard Artist (episodes 7, 13, and 17)	1971–1972
Andersen Monogatari	Animator	1971
Kunimatsu-sama no Otoridai	Animator	1971
New Moomin	Animator	1972
Akado Suzunosuke	Animator	1972
Dokonjo Gaeru	Animator	1972
Hazedon	Director	1972
Jungle Kurobe	Director	1973
Karate Master	Director	1973
Samurai Giants	Animator	1973
Aim for the Ace! / Ace o Nerae!	Director	1973–1974
First Human Giatrus	Episode Director	1974–1976
Japanese Folklore Tales	Animator	1975
Gamba no Bouken (Adventures of Gamba)	Director and Episode Director	1975
Ganso Tensai Bakabon	Episode Director	1975–1977
Gaiking	Animator	1976
Manga Fairy Tales of the World	Director, Episode Director and Animator	1976–1979
Jetter Mars	Animator	1976
Nobody's Boy: Remi	Director and Episode Director	1977–1978
Takarajima	Director	1978–1979
The Rose of Versailles	Director (from episode 19 onward)	1979–1980
Tomorrow's Joe 2	Director	1980–1981
Space Cobra	Director (with Yoshio Takeuchi)	1982–1983
Rainbow Brite	Joint Director	1984
The Mighty Orbots	Director	1984
Bionic Six	Supervising Director	1987
Visionaries: Knights of the Magical Light	Creative Consultant	1987
Dear Brother	Director	1991–1992
In the Beginning: The Bible Stories	Director	1997
Hakugei: Legend of the Moby Dick	Director	1997–1999
Astro Boy	Storyboard	2003
The Snow Queen	Director and Storyboard Artist	2005–2006
Ultraviolet: Code 044	Director, Screenplay, and Storyboard Artist	2008
Genji Monogatari Sennenki	Director and Screenplay	2009

=== Television specials ===
Title	Position	Year
Frosty the Snowman	Animation Director	December 7, 1969
Botchan	Supervisor	June 13, 1980
Sweet Sea	Director	September 1985
The Blinkins: The Bear and the Blizzard	Supervising Director	1987
Lupin III: Bye Bye, Lady Liberty	Director	April 1, 1989
Lupin III: Mystery of the Hemingway Papers	Director	July 20, 1990
Lupin III: Steal Napoleon's Dictionary!	Director	August 9, 1991
Lupin III: From Russia With Love	Director	July 24, 1992
Lupin III: The Pursuit of Harimao's Treasure	Director	August 4, 1995
Eiyuu Banka Koushi-den (The Life of Confucius)	Director	September 21, 1996

=== Original video animations ===
Title	Position	Year
Aim for the Ace! 2 / Ace o Nerae! 2	Supervising Director and Storyboard Artist	1988
One Pound Gospel	Director	1988
Kasei Yakyoku	Director	1989
Aim for the Ace! / Ace o Nerae! Final Stage	Director	1989–1990
B.B.	Director	1990–1991
Sword for Truth	Director	1990
Sohryuden: Legend of the Dragon Kings	Director	1991–1993
Takarajima Memorial: Yūnagi to Yobareta Otoko	Director	1992
Black Jack	Director	1993–2000
Golgo 13: Queen Bee	Director	1998

=== Movies ===
Title	Position	Year
A Thousand and One Nights	Animator	1969
Belladonna of Sadness	Key Animator	1973
Aim for the Ace! The Movie: Jump High, Hiromi!	Director	1979
Tomorrow's Joe: The Movie	Director	1980
Nobody's Boy: Remi	Director	1980
Tomorrow's Joe: The Movie 2	Director	1981
Space Adventure Cobra	Director	1982
Golgo 13: The Professional	Director	1983
The Seven Friends of Gamba	Director	1984
Treasure Island	Director	1987
Black Jack: The Movie	Director	1996
Hamtaro Movie 1: Adventures in Ham-Ham Land	Director, Co-Writer	2001
Hamtaro Movie 2: The Captive Princess	Director	2002
Hamtaro Movie 3: Miracle in Aurora Valley	Director	2003
Hamtaro Movie 4: Fairy Tale	Director	2004
Air	Director	2005
Clannad	Director	2007
