= Magic Bus (studio) =

Japanese animation studio

Magic Bus, Inc.
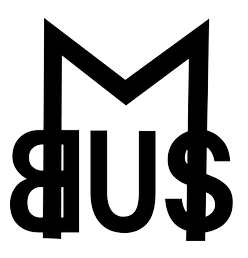
- Native name: 株式会社マジックバス
- Romanized name: Kabushiki-gaisha Majikku Basu
- Type: Kabushiki gaisha
- Industry: Anime
- Founded: April 1972
- Founder: Satoshi Dezaki
- Headquarters: Nishi-Tokyo, Tokyo, Japan, Japan
- Key people: Satoshi Dezaki (CEO); Board members: Keizou Shimizu; Tetsuo Mikami; Ryousuke Senbo
- Products: Animated films, animated television series
- Number of employees: 63 (2019)
- Divisions: Magic Bus Niigata

Magic Bus, Inc. (株式会社マジックバス, Kabushiki-gaisha Majikku Basu) is a Japanese animation studio headquartered in Nishi-Tokyo, Tokyo, Japan. The company was founded in April 1972 by producer and director Satoshi Dezaki, and the studio's first work was Shin Kyojin no Hoshi in 1977. In 1983, with Dezaki directing, Magic Bus collaborated in the animation production of Captain. Magic Bus has since become largely an animation subcontractor for other animation studios.

== Television series ==
Debut	Series title	Director	Original network	No. of episodes	Notes
1986	Wonder Beat Scramble	Satoshi Dezaki (#1–15); Seiji Arihara (#16–26)	TBS	26	Co-produced with Mushi Production.
1996	Kiko-chan's Smile	Setsuko Shibuichi	TBS	51	Based on a manga of the same name by Tsubasa Nunoura. Co-produced with Eiken.
1997	Burn-Up Excess	Shinichiro Kimura	DirecTV Japan	13	Remake of Burn Up! and Burn Up W by AIC.
1998	Sexy Commando Gaiden	Akitaro Daichi	TBS	48	Based on a manga of the same name by Tsubasa Nunoura.
1998	Knight Hunters: Weiß Kreuz	Kiyoshi Egami (#1–15); Kazunori Tanahashi (#16–25)	TV Tokyo	25	Co-produced with Animate Film. Magic Bus animated Part 1 only (eps. 1–15); Part 2 (eps. 16–25) was animated by PLUM.
1998	Charge! Pappara Squad	Kenichi Maejima	TV Tokyo	25	Based on a manga of the same name by Natsuki Matsuzawa.
1998	Surfside High School	Hiroyoshi Yoshida	TBS	20	
2001	Go! Go! Itsutsugo Land	Setsuko Shibuichi	TBS	50	Co-produced with Toei Animation.
2002	Demon Lord Dante	Kenichi Maejima	AT-X	13	Based on a manga of the same name by Go Nagai.
2003	Cinderella Boy	Tsuneo Tominaga	WOWOW	13	Based on a one-shot manga of the same name by Monkey Punch.
2003	Beast Fighter: The Apocalypse	Kenichi Maejima	AT-X	13	Based on The Demonic Beast Front manga by Ken Ishikawa.
2005	Damekko Dōbutsu	Setsuko Shibuichi	Kids Station	26	Based on a manga of the same name by Noriko Kuwata.
2005	Play Ball	Satoshi Dezaki	Animax	26	Based on a manga of the same name by Akio Chiba. Co-produced with Eiken.
2005	Patalliro Saiyuki!	Kenichi Maejima	Kids Station	26	Based on a manga of the same name by Mineo Maya.
2008	Cobra the Animation	Buichi Terasawa (#1–6); Keizu Shimizu (#7–19)	BS11 (#7–19)	19	Based on Space Adventure Cobra manga by Buichi Terasawa. The first 6 episodes were released direct-to-video.
2017	A Predator in a Skirt	Mitsutaka Noshitani	Tokyo MX	12	Based on The Beast Beneath the Skirt manga by Hanamaluo.
2019	Papa Datte, Shitai	Mitsutaka Noshitani	Tokyo MX	8	Based on a manga of the same name by Celina Seo.
2019	Yo-Kai Watch!	Ryousuke Senbo	TXN	36	Sequel to Yo-Kai Watch and prequel to Yo-Kai Watch Shadowside by OLM. Based on a video game franchise of the same name by Level-5.
2019	XL Boss	Mitsutaka Noshitani	Tokyo MX	8	Based on Is My Boss's Penis XL Size?! It Has a Thick Tip! manga by Itō Kani.
2020	Crazy Over His Fingers	Mitsutaka Noshitani	Tokyo MX	8	Based on Go Crazy With My Fingers – Waiting Impatiently Until the Salon Closes manga by Neco.
2022	Shoot! Goal to the Future	Noriyuki Nakamura	AT-X	13	Sequel to Blue Legend Shoot! by Toei Animation. Based on Shoot! manga by Tsukasa Ōshima. Co-produced with EMT Squared.
2023	The Aristocrat's Otherworldly Adventure: Serving Gods Who Go Too Far	Mitsutaka Noshitani (chief); Noriyuki Nakamura	AT-X	12	Based on Chronicles of an Aristocrat Reborn in Another World light novel by Yashu. Co-produced with EMT Squared.
2026	The Food Diary of Miss Maid	Ryousuke Senbo	Tokyo MX	12	Based on a manga of the same name by Susumu Maeya. Co-produced with EMT Squared.
2026	The Oblivious Saint Can't Contain Her Power	Mitsutaka Noshitani	Tokyo MX	TBA	Based on a light novel of the same name by Almond. Co-produced with Picante Circus.

== OVAs/ONAs ==
- Urusei Yatsura OVA (episodes 4–9, 1988–1989)
- Wounded Man (1986–1988)
- Mahjong Hishō-den: Naki no Ryū (with Gainax, 1988–1990)
- Gensei no Shugoshin P-hyoro Ikka (1988)
- Cipher the Video (March 3, 1989)
- Kasei Yakyoku (March 25 - September 25, 1989)
- Riki-Oh (June 25, 1989 - August 24, 1990)
- Fujiko F. Fujio's SF (Slightly Mysterious) Short Theater (May 1990 – May 1991, episodes 3–7)
- Mad Bull 34 (December 21, 1990 – August 21, 1992)
- Burning Blood (April 25, 1990 – April 25, 1991)
- Taiman Blues: Ladies-hen Mayumi (1990)
- Sword for Truth (December 28, 1990, with Toei Animation)
- Carol (March 21, 1990, with Animate Film)
- Phantom Yūsha Densetsu (January 24, 1991)
- The Gakuen Choujotai (June 27, 1991)
- Yūkan Club (July 25, 1991 – December 14, 1991)
- Mahjong Hishōden: Naki no Ryū 2 (with GAINAX, 1991)
- Christmas in January (November 21, 1991)
- Hayō no Ken: Shokkoku no Mashō (1992)
- Saitama Bōsō Saizensen Flag! Shinimonogurui no Seishun!! (December 1, 1995)
- Legend of the Galactic Heroes (1996–1997, 39 episodes)
- Dragoon (July 25, 1997 – November 28, 1997)
- Toki no Daichi: Hana no Oukoku no Majo (1998–1999)
- Legend of the Galactic Heroes: A Hundred Billion Stars, A Hundred Billion Lights (episodes 1–4, 13–14, 20, and 24, 1998)
- Legend of the Galactic Heroes: Spiral Labyrinth (1999–2000, episodes 1–14, 16–17, 19–23, and 27–28)
- Amai Chōbatsu: Watashi wa Kanshu Senyō Pet (2018)
- Araiya-san! Ore to Aitsu ga Onnayu de!? (2019)

== Films ==
- Pro Yakyū o 10-bai Tanoshiku Miru Hōhō Part 2 (April 21, 1984)
- Tobira o Akete (November 1, 1986)
- They Were Eleven (November 1, 1986)
- Urusei Yatsura: The Final Chapter (February 6, 1988)
- Shirahata no Shōjo Ryūko (July 21, 1988)
- Ajin Senshi (November 17, 1990)
- Boyfriend (February 11, 1992) - television film
- Senbon Matsubara: Kawa to Ikiru Shōnen-tachi (July 11, 1992) - co-produced with Mushi Production
- Legend of the Galactic Heroes: Golden Wings (December 12, 1992)
- Mii-chan no Tenohira (May 29, 1993) - short film
- Big Wars (September 25, 1993)
- Aoi Kioku: Manmō Kaitaku to Shōnen-tachi (December 18, 1993)
- Legend of the Galactic Heroes: Overture to a New War (December 18, 1993)
- Yukiwatari (July 16, 1994) - short film
- Bakumatsu no Spasibo (September 20, 1997)
- Otoko wa Tsurai yo: Torajirō Wasure na Kusa (August 7, 1998) - television film; co-produced with Eiken
- Happy Birthday: Inochi Kagayaku Toki (July 27, 1999)
- Inochi no Chikyū: Dioxin no Natsu (August 18, 2001)
- Aterui (August 5, 2002)
- Yume Kakeru Kougen: Kiyosato no Chichi Paul Rusch (October 19, 2002)
- Momoko, Kaeru no Uta ga Kikoeru yo. (July 23, 2003)
- Hurdle (January 15, 2005)
- Shinshaku Sengoku Eiyū Densetsu Sanada Jū Yūshi The Animation (January 29, 2005) - television film
- Glass no Usagi (May 14, 2005)
