= Satoshi Dezaki =

Japanese anime director (born 1940)

- Born: June 26, 1940 (age 86)
- Occupations: Anime director, producer, screenwriter
- Relatives: Osamu Dezaki (brother)

Satoshi Dezaki (出﨑 哲, Dezaki Satoshi; born June 26, 1940) (Note: A video interview with Dezaki published by Ekura Animal refers to him as "Tetsu"; however, most publications throughout the decades have referred to him a "Satoshi", and a separate video interview hosted by Channel Office Iwama also introduces him as "Satoshi", as does the Directors Guild of Japan.) is an anime director, producer, and screenwriter. After graduating from Tokyo Metropolitan North High School, he attended Hosei University. His younger brother was the late anime director Osamu Dezaki.

== Brief history ==
Dezaki was born in Tokyo, Japan. After graduating from high school, he took a position at Toshiba while studying in the department of literature at Hosei University. While doing both of these, he continued to work on his dream job of working on movie production. He acted as the coach for the nine-member volleyball team at Toshiba. Dezaki also began pulling together an anime production team.

Dezaki resigned after working for seven years at Toshiba, leaving Hosei University in the middle of a term as well. He began working for Gisaburō Sugii's company Art Fresh, working alongside his younger brother Osamu. His first works included writing the script for Attack No. 1 and storyboarding Star of the Giants.

In 1969, Dezaki became a freelancer, directing and writing screenplays for series and films produced by Tokyo Movie Shinsha, Tatsunoko Production, and Sunrise. In 1977, he founded Magic Bus and produced and animated Shin Kyojin no Hoshi.

== Works ==
- Aterui (Director, Screenplay, Producer)
- Attack No. 1 (screenplay)
- Big Wars (producer)
- Boyfriend (manga) (Director)
- Captain (Director)
- Carol (anime) (director)
- Ganso Tensai Bakabon (director)
- Grey: Digital Target (director, continuity)
- Inochi No Chikyuu: Dioxin No Natsu (Director)
- Kyojin no Hoshi (storyboards)
- La Seine no Hoshi (assistant director, episode director and storyboards)
- Mad Bull 34 (director)
- Mahjong Hishō-den: Naki no Ryū (director)
- Mighty Orbots (storyboards)
- Play Ball (chief director)
- Pro Yakyuū o 10 Oku Tanoshiku Miru Hōhō Part 2 (Chief Animation Director)
- Riki-Oh: Tōkatsu Jigoku (Director)
- Riki-Oh 2: Horobi no Ko (Director)
- The Rose of Versailles (director (eps.6, 8))
- Saitama Bōsō Saizensen Flag! Shinimonogurui no Seishun!! (director)
- Shin Kyojin no Hoshi (producer, animator)
- Shirahata no Shōjo Ryūko (Director, Screenplay)
- Star of the Giants 1982 movie (Director)
- Sword for Truth (producer)
- New Tetsujin-28 (episode director)
- They Were Eleven (director, storyboards)
- A Time Slip of 10,000 Years: Prime Rose (director)
- Tobira o Akete (screenplay)
- Undersea Super Train: Marine Express (Chief Director, Rendition)
- Urusei Yatsura Kanketsuhen (director)
- Urusei Yatsura: Inaba the Dreammaker (director)
- Wounded Man (Director (eps. 2–5))
- Wonder Beat Scramble (Director (eps. 1–15), Storyboard (ep. 1), Episode Director)
