= Man in the Moon (disambiguation) =

The Man in the Moon is a shape resembling a human face or figure perceived in the Moon.

Man in the Moon or The Man in the Moon may also refer to:

== Film and television ==
- Man in the Moon (film), a 1960 British comedy starring Kenneth More
- The Man in the Moon (1991 film), an American film starring Reese Witherspoon
- The Man in the Moon, a 2011 short film directed by William Joyce
- The Man in the Moon (Pontiac Star Parade), a 1960 American television special

== Literature ==
- The Man in the Moone, a 1638 novel by Francis Godwin
- "The Man in the Moon" (nursery rhyme), an English-language nursery rhyme
- The Man in the Moon (novel), a 2002 novel by James Blaylock
- The Man in the Moon (Joyce book), a 2011 picture book by William Joyce
- Endymion, the Man in the Moon, an Elizabethan play by John Lyly
- The Man in the Moone, a poem by Michael Drayton
- "Mon in the Mone", a medieval English poem from the Harley Lyrics

== Music ==
- The Man in the Moon (musical), 1899 Broadway musical
- Man in the Moon (L.A. Guns album), or the title song (2001)
- Man in the Moon (Nektar album), or the title song (1980)
- Man in the Moon (Jonathan Edwards album)
- "Man in the Moon", a song by Daniel Amos from the 1981 album Horrendous Disc
- "Man in the Moon", a 2003 song by Fragma
- "The Man in the Moon", a 1941 song by Glenn Miller
- "Man in the Moon", a 1989 song by Titiyo
- "Man in the Moon", a song by Voice of the Beehive from the 1998 album Let It Bee
- "Man in the Moon", a song by Yes from the 1997 album Open Your Eyes
- "Man in the Moon", a song by The Saw Doctors released in 2024
- "Man in the Moon", a song by Coldplay from the 2024 album Moon Music (Full Moon Edition)

== Other uses ==
- Man in the Moon (event), a 2013 Fourth of July celebration produced by talk-radio personality Glenn Beck
- "The Man in the Moon", a 1950 episode of the radio program Dimension X
- The Man in the Moon, a pseudonym of Daniel Defoe
- The Man in the Moon, a 1920s American children's radio show on WABC in Newark, New Jersey

== See also ==
- Moon god
- Man and the Moon, an episode of the TV series Disneyland
- "Man in the Moonbounce", an episode of the TV series American Dad
- Man on the Moon (disambiguation)
- Woman in the Moon (disambiguation)
- Moon Man (disambiguation)
