= A Day with Wilbur Robinson =

Book by William Joyce

- Author: William Joyce
- Language: English
- Genre: Children's picture book
- Published: April 15, 1990; 36 years ago (HarperTrophy)
- Publication place: United States
- Media type: Print (hardback & paperback)
- Pages: 29 pp
- ISBN: 0-06-443339-0
- OCLC: 30559641

A Day with Wilbur Robinson is a 1990 American children's picture book (slightly expanded for a 2006 reissue) written and illustrated by William Joyce. A film adaptation titled Meet the Robinsons, produced by Walt Disney Animation Studios, released on March 30, 2007.

== Plot summary ==
A Day with Wilbur Robinson follows the story of a boy who visits an unusual family and their home. While spending the day in the Robinson household, Wilbur's best friend joins in the search for Grandfather Robinson's missing false teeth and meets one wacky relative after another.

== Contents ==
Karen James of the Louisville Free Public Library wrote in School Library Journal that the book's visuals have similarity to advertisements published in the 1940s and that certain aspects "seem influenced by that period." She added the humor is generally expressed in the images while the text is "restrained, slightly tongue-in-cheek".

== Characters ==
- The Narrator: Wilbur Robinson's friend. He visits the home of his friend and spends all day there. He joins in the search for Grandfather Robinson and his missing false teeth and meets all the Robinson relatives.
- Wilbur Robinson: a boy who, with his friend, searches his home for Grandfather Robinson's teeth.
- Mr. Robinson: Wilbur's father
- Mrs. Robinson: Wilbur's mother
- Uncles Dmitri & Spike: Wilbur's uncles who live outside
- Lefty: the Robinsons' octopus butler.
- Carl: the Robinsons' robot
- Aunt Billie: owns a life-size train set
- Cousin Pete: has tigers for pets
- Uncle Gaston: a human cannonball
- Uncle Wormly: consorts with human-sized bugs
- Uncle Nimbus: makes it snow in the house
- Uncle Orbley: blows human-sized bubbles
- Uncle Judlow: uses a device to think deep thoughts
- Uncle Art: travels through space
- Cousin Lazlo: has an anti-gravity machine
- Tallulah Robinson: Wilbur's sister
- Blanche Robinson: Wilbur's sister who wears odd dresses
- Grandfather Robinson: is Wilbur's grandfather who owns a band of singing frogs and is always missing parts like false teeth and a glass eye. He himself occasionally goes missing as well.
- Grandmother Robinson: Wilbur's grandmother who plays the saxophone
- Mr. Ellington: a friend of Grandfather Robinson based on Duke Ellington
- Mr. Armstrong: a friend of Grandfather Robinson based on Louis Armstrong

== Release ==
The 2006 re-release has a new cover and new endpapers, as well as new imagery.

In 2017 Atheneum was to reissue A Day with Wilbur Robinson.

== Film adaptation ==
Walt Disney Animation Studios released on March 30, 2007 a 3-D computer-animated film adaptation Meet the Robinsons, directed by Stephen Anderson.

== Reception ==
Gillian Engberg of Booklist stated that the juxtaposition of "fantastical pictures" with "deadpan words" is the "real fun" of all versions of the book; she added that if the book is read to a group of readers, the group sizes should be small in order to best show "wondrous visual details".

James wrote that readers would like "changing perspectives" and "imaginative details", and that a "satisfying contrast" is seen in a comparison with the visuals showing the humor and the text.

Publishers Weekly wrote that "Dinosaur Bob fans should rejoice" and that children would enjoy it, despite the setting being "overwhelming".

Malcolm Jones, Jr. of Newsweek wrote that it is "equally zany" as Dinosaur Bob and that Joyce was "one of the best" artists who had a style similar to Chris Van Allsburg.

== Publication data ==
- A Day with Wilbur Robinson (HarperTrophy reprint edition, September 30, 1993) ISBN 0-06-443339-0; ISBN 978-0-06-443339-6
- A Day with Wilbur Robinson (Laura Geringer, August 22, 2006) ISBN 0-06-089098-3; ISBN 978-0-06-089098-8
