= 41st Daytime Creative Arts Emmy Awards =

- Awarded for: Outstanding achievement in all fields of daytime television
- Date: June 20, 2014
- Location: Westin Bonaventure in Los Angeles, California, U.S.
- Presented by: National Academy of Television Arts and Sciences

Highlights
- Most awards: The Young and the Restless (5)
- Most nominations: The Young and the Restless (26)
- Website: emmyonline.org

The 41st Daytime Creative Arts Emmy Awards ceremony, which honors the crafts behind American daytime television programming, was held at the Westin Bonaventure Hotel in Los Angeles on June 20, 2014. The event was presented in conjunction with the 41st Daytime Emmy Awards by the National Academy of Television Arts and Sciences. The nominations were announced on May 1, 2014.

== Winners and nominees ==
In the lists below, the winner of the category is in bold.

=== Animated programs ===
Category	Winners and nominees
Outstanding Children's Animated Program	**Kung Fu Panda: Legends of Awesomeness** **(Nickelodeon)**; Beware the Batman - Episode: "Secrets" (Cartoon Network); The Fairly OddParents (Nickelodeon); Monsters vs. Aliens (Nickelodeon); Turbo FAST (Netflix)
Outstanding Special Class Animated Program	**Star Wars: The Clone Wars** **(Cartoon Network)**; Dan Vs. (Hub Network); Peter Rabbit (Nickelodeon); Transformers: Prime Beast Hunters (Hub Network)
Outstanding Pre-School Children's Animated Program	**Peg + Cat** **(PBS)**; Curious George (PBS); Sofia the First (Disney Channel); Wonder Pets! (Nickelodeon)
Outstanding Performer in an Animated Program	**Hayley Faith Negrin** as **Peg** on **Peg + Cat** **(PBS)**; Alan Cumming as Sebastian Winkleplotz on Arthur: "Show Off" (PBS); Ashley Tisdale as Sabrina Spellman on Sabrina: Secrets of a Teenage Witch (Hub Network); Sarah Bolt as Jemima Puddleduck on Peter Rabbit (Nickelodeon); Dwayne Hill as Cat on Peg + Cat (PBS)
Outstanding Directing in an Animated Program	**The Scarecrow** **(YouTube.com)**; Beware the Batman - Episode: "Secrets" (Cartoon Network); Curious George (PBS); Dan Vs. (Hub Network); Kung Fu Panda: Legends of Awesomeness (Nickelodeon)
Outstanding Writing in an Animated Program	**Peter Hirsch, Craig Carlisle, Jacqui Deegan, Matt Hoverman, and Dietrich Smith** for **Arthur** (PBS); Gene Grillo, Peter Hastings, Scott Kreamer, Doug Langdale, and Paul Rugg for Kung Fu Panda: Legends of Awesomeness (Nickelodeon); Ken Scarborough, Joe Fallon, and Raye Lankford for Martha Speaks (PBS); Chris Kratt and Martin Kratt for Wild Kratts (PBS)
Outstanding Writing in a Pre-School Animated Program	**Jonny Belt, Robert Scull, and Clark Stubbs for** **Bubble Guppies** **(Nickelodeon)**; Craig Bartlett and Joe Purdy for Dinosaur Train (PBS); Mark Huckerby and Nick Ostler for Peter Rabbit (Nickelodeon); Doug Cooney, Laurie Israel, Erica Rothschild, Rachel Ruderman, and Craig Gerber for Sofia the First (Disney Channel); Billy Lopez, Billy Aronson, Dustin Ferrer, Chris Nee, and Melanie Pal for Wonder Pets! (Nickelodeon)
Outstanding Casting for an Animated Series or Special	**Sarah Noonan, Gene Vassilaros, and Meredith Layne for** **Teenage Mutant Ninja Turtles** **(Nickelodeon)**; Matthew Jon Beck, Ruth Lambert, and Robert McGee for The Polar Bears (YouTube.com); Brian Mathias for Sofia the First (Disney Channel); Andrea Romano for Beware the Batman (Cartoon Network)
Outstanding Individual Achievement in Animation	Ernie Gilbert for character design in T.U.F.F. Puppy (Nickelodeon); Eddie Gribbin for background design in Peter Rabbit (Nickelodeon); Marten Jonmark for storyboard in Peter Rabbit (Nickelodeon); Jose Lopez for character design in Transformers Prime Beast Hunters: Predacons Rising (Hub Network); Yasuhiro Motoda for character animator in Transformers Prime Beast Hunters: Predacons Rising (Hub Network); Jennifer Oxley for production design in Peg + Cat (PBS); Stephen Robinson for production design in Peter Rabbit (Nickelodeon); Christopher Voy for color in Star Wars: The Clone Wars (Cartoon Network)
Outstanding Sound Editing – Animation	**SpongeBob SquarePants** **(Nickelodeon)**; Kung Fu Panda: Legends of Awesomeness (Nickelodeon); Monsters vs. Aliens (Nickelodeon); Sanjay and Craig (Nickelodeon); Star Wars: The Clone Wars (Cartoon Network)
Outstanding Sound Mixing – Animation	**Kung Fu Panda: Legends of Awesomeness** **(Nickelodeon)**; Monsters vs. Aliens (Nickelodeon); Star Wars: The Clone Wars (Cartoon Network); Teenage Mutant Ninja Turtles (Nickelodeon); Turbo FAST (Netflix); Young Justice (Cartoon Network)

=== Children's Series ===
Category	Winners and nominees
Outstanding Pre-School Children's Series	**Sesame Street** **(PBS)**; Dino Dan (Nickelodeon); The Fresh Beat Band (Nickelodeon); Yo Gabba Gabba! (Nickelodeon)
Outstanding Children's Series	**R.L. Stine's The Haunting Hour** **(Hub Network)**; Animal Science (Syndicated); Game Changers with Kevin Frazier **(CBS)**; Sea Rescue (Syndicated)
Outstanding Performer in a Children's Series	**Jessica Honor Carleton** as **Snail, Mouse, Monster, Cow & Lion** on **Green Screen Adventures** **(MeTV)**; Leslie Carrara-Rudolph as Sigrid, Carrie, Flantine, Velvet & Old Lady on Sesame Street (PBS); Katie Douglas as Sally Wilcox on Spooksville (Hub Network); Joey Mazzarino as Stinky, Murray and Davy Jones on Sesame Street (PBS); David Rudman as Cookie Monster and Baby Bear on Sesame Street (PBS)
Outstanding Directing in a Children's Series	**Sesame Street** **(PBS)**; R.L. Stine's The Haunting Hour (Hub Network); Spooksville (Hub Network)
Outstanding Writing in a Children's Series	**Joey Mazzarino, Molly Boylan, Annie Evans, Christine Ferraro, Emily Perl Kingsley, Luis Santeiro, Ed Valentine, Belinda Ward, John Weidman** for **Sesame Street** **(PBS)**; Dan Angel, Brandon Auman, Billy Brown, Rick Drew, Nicole Dubuc, Jed Elinoff, John Esposito, Melody Fox, Harold Hayes Jr., Natalie Lapointe, Jack Monaco, Erik Patterson, Craig Philips, Jessica Scott, Tim Shell, Scott Thomas, Greg Yolen for R.L. Stine's The Haunting Hour (Hub Network); Jason deVilliers, Christian Jacobs, and Gerard Way for The Aquabats! Super Show! (Hub Network)

=== Drama Series ===
Category	Winners and nominees
Outstanding Art Direction/Set Decoration/Scenic Design for a Drama Series	**All My Children** **(TOLN.com)**; **One Life to Live** **(TOLN.com)**; The Bold and the Beautiful (CBS); General Hospital (ABC)
Outstanding Casting Director for a Drama Series	**Mark Teschner for** **General Hospital** **(ABC)**; Christy Dooley for The Bold and the Beautiful (CBS); Marnie Saitta for Days of Our Lives (NBC); Judy Blye Wilson for The Young and the Restless (CBS)
Outstanding Costume Design for a Drama Series	**The Bold and the Beautiful** **(CBS)**; **The Young and the Restless** **(CBS)**; Days of Our Lives (NBC); General Hospital (ABC)
Outstanding Multiple Camera Editing for a Drama Series	**The Bold and the Beautiful** **(CBS)**; Days of Our Lives (NBC); General Hospital (ABC); One Life to Live (TOLN.com); The Young and the Restless (CBS)
Outstanding Hairstyling for a Drama Series	**The Bold and the Beautiful** **(CBS)**; Days of Our Lives (NBC); One Life to Live (TOLN.com); The Young and the Restless (CBS)
Outstanding Lighting Direction for a Drama Series	**The Young and the Restless** **(CBS)**; The Bold and the Beautiful (CBS); General Hospital (ABC)
Outstanding Makeup for a Drama Series	**The Bold and the Beautiful** **(CBS)**; **General Hospital** **(ABC)**; Days of Our Lives (NBC); The Young and the Restless (CBS)
Outstanding Music Direction and Composition for a Drama Series	**All My Children** **(TOLN.com)**; The Bold and the Beautiful (CBS); Days of Our Lives (NBC); The Young and the Restless (CBS)
Outstanding Original Song – Drama	**“Parachute” ~ composer & lyricist Denyse Tontz, composer Suren Wijeyaratne -** **All My Children** **(TOLN.com)**; “A Love That Never Ends” ~ composers D. Brent Nelson and Kenneth R. Corday, lyricist John David Webb - Days of Our Lives (NBC); “Make Me Remember” ~ composer & lyricist Kati Mac and Rick Krizman - The Young and the Restless (CBS); “While We Can” ~ composer & lyricist Kati Mac and Joie Scott - The Young and the Restless (CBS)
Outstanding Live and Direct to Tape Sound Mixing for a Drama Series	**One Life to Live** **(TOLN.com)**; All My Children (TOLN.com); The Bold and the Beautiful (CBS); The Young and the Restless (CBS)
Outstanding Technical Team for a Drama Series	**The Young and the Restless** **(CBS)**; The Bold and the Beautiful (CBS); Days of Our Lives (NBC); General Hospital (ABC)

=== Lifestyle, Culinary, and Travel programs ===
Category	Winners and nominees
Outstanding Lifestyle Program	**Elbow Room** **(HGTV)**; America Now (Syndicated); Home & Family (Hallmark Channel); Home Made Simple (OWN); This Old House (PBS)
Outstanding Travel Program	**Ocean Mysteries with Jeff Corwin** **(Syndicated)**; Awesome Adventures (Syndicated); Curious Traveler (YouTube.com); Jack Hanna's Into the Wild (Syndicated)
Outstanding Lifestyle/Travel Host	**Joseph Rosendo** in **Joseph Rosendo's Travelscope** **(PBS)**; Rebecca Budig, Audra Lowe, and JD Roberto in Better (Syndicated); Jeff Corwin in Ocean Mysteries with Jeff Corwin (Syndicated); Leeza Gibbons and Bill Rancic in America Now (Syndicated); Jack Hanna in Jack Hanna's Into the Wild (Syndicated); Richard Wiese in Born to Explore with Richard Wiese (Syndicated)
Outstanding Directing in a Lifestyle/Culinary/Travel Program	**Ocean Mysteries with Jeff Corwin** **(Syndicated)**; Born to Explore with Richard Wiese (Syndicated); Joseph Rosendo's Travelscope (PBS); The Mind of a Chef (PBS); This Old House (PBS)
Outstanding Directing in a Talk Show/Morning Program	**The Dr. Oz Show** **(Syndicated)**; CBS Sunday Morning (CBS); Rachael Ray (Syndicated); Steve Harvey (Syndicated); The View (ABC)

=== Outstanding New Approaches ===
Category	Winners and nominees
Outstanding New Approaches – Enhancement to a Daytime Program or Series	**The Ellen DeGeneres Show** **(Syndicated)**; The Electric Company (PBS); mtvU's Against Our Will Campaign (mtvU); Sesame Street (PBS); Sesame Street: Little Children, Big Challenges: Incarceration (PBS)
Outstanding New Approaches – Original Daytime Program or Series	**The Scarecrow** **(YouTube.com)**; Design Squad Nation (PBS); The Weight of the Nation: Kebreeya's Salad Days (HBO)

=== Series ===
Category	Winners and nominees
Outstanding Art Direction/Set Decoration/Scenic Design	**The Ellen DeGeneres Show** **(Syndicated)**; R.L. Stine's The Haunting Hour (Hub Network); Spooksville (Hub Network); The Talk (CBS)
Outstanding Costume Design/Styling	**Spooksville** **(Hub Network)**; The Ellen DeGeneres Show (Syndicated); The Fresh Beat Band (Nickelodeon); Green Screen Adventures (MeTV); Sesame Street (PBS)
Outstanding Multiple Camera Editing	**Sesame Street** **(PBS)**; CBS Sunday Morning (CBS); Disney Parks Christmas Day Parade (ABC); The Ellen DeGeneres Show (Syndicated); Super Soul Sunday (OWN)
Outstanding Single Camera Editing	**Giada in Paradise** **(Cooking Channel)**; Made in Israel (ABC Family); The Mind of a Chef (PBS); This Old House (PBS)
Outstanding Hairstyling	**The Queen Latifah Show** **(Syndicated)**; Bethenny (Syndicated); Rachael Ray (Syndicated); The Talk (CBS)
Outstanding Lighting Direction	**The Ellen DeGeneres Show** **(Syndicated)**; **Wheel of Fortune** **(Syndicated)**; The Aquabats! Super Show! (Hub Network); The Queen Latifah Show (Syndicated); Sesame Street (PBS)
Outstanding Main Title and Graphic Design	**Sabrina: Secrets of a Teenage Witch** **(Hub Network)**; Beware the Batman - Episode: "Secrets" (Cartoon Network); Lalaloopsy (Nickelodeon); The Mind of a Chef (PBS); Superbook (ABC Family)
Outstanding Makeup	**Green Screen Adventures** **(MeTV)**; R.L. Stine's The Haunting Hour (Hub Network); Spooksville (Hub Network); The Talk (CBS)
Outstanding Music Direction and Composition	**Bubble Guppies** **(Nickelodeon)**; The Backyardigans (Nickelodeon); Sofia the First (Disney Channel); The Wonder Pets! (Nickelodeon)
Outstanding Original Song	**“30,000 Reasons to Love Me” ~ composer Cat Gray, lyricist Wayne Brady -** **Let's Make a Deal** **(CBS)**; “ABC’s of moving” ~ composer Chris Jackson, lyricist Joseph Mazzarino - Sesame Street (PBS); “I Belong” ~ lyricist Craig Gerber, composer & lyricist John Kavanaugh - Sofia the First (Disney Channel); “Rhymes with Mando” ~ composer Lin-Manuel Miranda, lyricist Luis Santeiro - Sesame Street (PBS); “Spring Has Sprung” ~ composer & lyricist Peter Zizzo - Peter Rabbit (Nickelodeon)
Outstanding Original Song – Main Title and Promo	**“Disney Sofia the First: Main Title Theme” ~ lyricist Craig Gerber, composer & lyricist John Kavanaugh -** **Sofia the First** **(Disney Channel)**; “PAW Patrol Theme Song” ~ composer Michael “Smidi” Smith, lyricist Scott Krippayne - PAW Patrol (Nickelodeon); “Peter Rabbit Theme Song” ~ composer & lyricist Peter Lurye - Peter Rabbit (Nickelodeon); “Superbook Open” ~ lyricists Mark Hammond and Marty Goetz - Superbook (ABC Family); “We’re Fusion” ~ composer Adam Schlesinger, lyricist David Javerbaum - Opening Number to Fusion (Fusion)
Outstanding Promotional Announcement – Episodic	**Nature** **(PBS)**; 2013 MTV Video Music Awards - Katy Perry (MTV); The Doctors (Syndicated); Hispanic Heritage Month Campaign (Disney XD); World Wide Day of Play 2013 Campaign (Nickelodeon)
Outstanding Promotional Announcement – Institutional	**Awkward / It's Your Sex Life - Gimme an “S”** **(MTV)**; General Hospital (ABC); Nick 2013 Halloween Campaign (Nickelodeon); Nick Letter IDs (Nickelodeon)
Outstanding Live and Direct to Tape Sound Mixing	**The Ellen DeGeneres Show** **(Syndicated)**; The Chew (ABC); Rachael Ray (Syndicated); The Today Show (NBC)
Outstanding Sound Editing – Live Action	**Sesame Street** **(PBS)**; The Mind of a Chef (PBS)
Outstanding Sound Mixing – Live Action	**Sesame Street** **(PBS)**; The Aquabats! Super Show! (Hub Network); Disney Parks Christmas Day Parade (ABC)
Outstanding Stunt Coordination	**Skip Carlsen for The Aquabats! Super Show!** **(Hub Network)**; Brett Armstrong for Spooksville (Hub Network); Braxton McAllister for The Aquabats! Super Show! (Hub Network)
Outstanding Single Camera Photography	**Giada in Paradise** **(Cooking Channel)**; Jonathan Bird's Blue World (Blueworldtv.com); Made in Israel (ABC Family); The Mind of a Chef (PBS)
Outstanding Technical Team	**Disney Parks Christmas Day Parade** **(ABC)**; The Ellen DeGeneres Show (Syndicated); Good Morning America (ABC); The Price Is Right (CBS)

=== Special Classes ===
Category	Winners and nominees
Outstanding Special Class Series	**Super Soul Sunday** **(OWN)**; Ask This Old House (PBS); Lucky Dog (CBS); Sanjay Gupta, MD (CNN)
Outstanding Special Class – Short Format Daytime Program	**mI promise** **(www.mIpromise.com)**; Deadman (Episode: "Deadman Catch") (Cartoon Network); Friends for Change (Disney Channel); Make Your Mark (Disney Channel); Stella and Sam (Sprout)
Outstanding Special Class Directing	**Giada in Paradise** **(Cooking Channel)**; Disney Parks Christmas Day Parade (ABC); 87th Annual Macy's Thanksgiving Day Parade (NBC)
Outstanding Special Class Writing	**The Ellen DeGeneres Show** **(Syndicated)**; Born to Explore with Richard Wiese (Syndicated); Disney Parks Christmas Day Parade (ABC); Joseph Rosendo's Travelscope (PBS); Made in Israel (ABC Family)

== Multiple wins ==
By network

- PBS – 12
- Nickelodeon – 10
- Syndicated – 10
- CBS – 8
- Hub Network – 6
- TOLN.com – 5
- ABC – 3
- Cooking Channel – 3
- Cartoon Network – 2
- MeTV – 2
- YouTube.com – 2
- Disney Channel – 1
- HGTV – 1
- www.mlpromise.com – 1
- MTV – 1
- OWN – 1

By program

- Sesame Street – 6
- The Ellen DeGeneres Show – 5
- The Bold and the Beautiful – 4
- Peg + Cat – 3
- All My Children – 3
- Giada In Paradise – 3
- Peter Rabbit – 3
- The Young and the Restless – 3
- Bubble Guppies – 2
- General Hospital – 2
- Green Screen Adventures – 2
- Kung Fu Panda: Legends of Awesomeness – 2
- Ocean Mysteries with Jeff Corwin – 2
- One Life to Live – 2
- The Scarecrow – 2
- Star Wars: The Clone Wars – 2
- Transformers Prime Beast Hunters: Predacons Rising – 2

== Multiple nominations ==
By network

- PBS – 41
- Nickelodeon – 37
- Syndicated – 32
- CBS – 30
- Hub Network – 23
- ABC – 16
- Cartoon Network – 10
- NBC – 10
- Disney Channel – 8
- TOLN.com – 8
- ABC Family – 5
- YouTube.com – 4
- Cooking Channel – 3
- MeTV – 3
- OWN – 3
- MTV – 2
- Netflix – 2
- Blueworldtv.com – 1
- CNN – 1
- Disney XD – 1
- Fusion – 1
- Hallmark Channel – 1
- HBO – 1
- HGTV – 1
- www.mlpromise.com – 1
- mtvU – 1
- Sprout – 1

By program

- Sesame Street – 15
- The Young and the Restless – 11
- The Bold and the Beautiful – 10
- Days of Our Lives – 8
- The Ellen DeGeneres Show – 8
- General Hospital – 8
- Peter Rabbit – 8
- Sofia the First – 6
- Spooksville – 6
- The Aquabats! Super Show! – 5
- Disney Parks Christmas Day Parade – 5
- Kung Fu Panda: Legends of Awesomeness – 5
- The Mind of a Chef – 5
- R.L. Stine's The Haunting Hour – 5
- All My Children – 4
- One Life to Live – 4
- Peg + Cat – 4
- Star Wars: The Clone Wars – 4
- Beware the Batman - Episode: "Secrets" – 3
- Born to Explore with Richard Wiese – 3
- Giada In Paradise – 3
- Green Screen Adventures – 3
- Joseph Rosendo's Travelscope – 3
- Made in Israel – 3
- Monsters vs. Aliens – 3
- Ocean Mysteries with Jeff Corwin – 3
- This Old House – 3
- The Wonder Pets! – 3
- Rachael Ray (TV series) – 3
- The Talk – 3
- Transformers Prime Beast Hunters: Predacons Rising – 3
- America Now – 2
- Arthur – 2
- Bubble Guppies – 2
- CBS Sunday Morning – 2
- Curious George – 2
- Dan Vs. – 2
- The Fresh Beat Band – 2
- Jack Hanna's Into the Wild – 2
- The Queen Latifah Show – 2
- Sabrina: Secrets of a Teenage Witch – 2
- The Scarecrow – 2
- Superbook – 2
- Super Soul Sunday – 2
- Teenage Mutant Ninja Turtles – 2
- Turbo FAST – 2
