= Travelling Man =

Travelling Man may refer to:

- "Travelin' Man", a 1961 Ricky Nelson single
- Travelling Man (album), a 1998 compilation album by Caravan.
- Travelling Man (TV series), 1984 British television series
- "Travlin' Man", a 1967 single by Stevie Wonder
- "Traveling Man", a song by Dolly Parton off the 1973 album Bubbling Over
- "Travelin' Man", a song by Bob Seger off the 1975 album Beautiful Loser and Live Bullet (1976)
- "Travelling Man", a 2012 The Original Rudeboys single
- Travelling Man, a 1999 Ralph McTell album
- Travelling Man - the Best of Dennis Brown vol. 2, a 1995 Dennis Brown album
- "Travellin' Man", a song by Lynyrd Skynyrd from the 1976 live album One More from the Road
- "Travelling Man", a song by Chameleon Circuit from the 2011 album Still Got Legs
- The Traveling Man, a series of metal sculptures in Deep Ellum, Dallas
- Travellin' Man, a song by Free on the 1972 album Free at Last
