= Ultraman: Rising =

2024 animated superhero film

- Official release poster

Japanese name
- Kanji: ウルトラマン: ライジング
Transcriptions
- Revised Hepburn: Urutoraman: Raijingu
- Directed by: Shannon Tindle
- Written by: Shannon Tindle; Marc Haimes
- Based on: Ultraman by Tsuburaya Productions
- Produced by: Tom Knott; Lisa M. Poole
- Starring: Christopher Sean; Gedde Watanabe; Tamlyn Tomita; Keone Young; Julia Harriman
- Cinematography: John Bermudes
- Edited by: Bret Marnell
- Music by: Scot Stafford
- Production companies: Netflix Animation Studios; Tsuburaya Productions; Industrial Light & Magic
- Distributed by: Netflix
- Release dates: June 12, 2024 (Annecy Festival); June 14, 2024 (Worldwide)
- Running time: 117 minutes
- Countries: United States; Japan
- Language: English

Ultraman: Rising (Japanese: ウルトラマン: ライジング, Hepburn: Urutoraman: Raijingu) is a 2024 animated superhero film based on Tsuburaya Productions' Ultraman franchise. A Japanese-American co-production between Netflix Animation Studios and Tsuburaya Productions, with animation by Industrial Light & Magic, it is the 33rd film in the franchise. Directed by Shannon Tindle in his feature directorial debut, who also co-wrote the script with Marc Haimes and co-directed by John Aoshima. The film stars Christopher Sean as Ken Sato/Ultraman along with the voices of Gedde Watanabe, Tamlyn Tomita, Keone Young, and Julia Harriman.

Ultraman: Rising was released worldwide on Netflix on June 14, 2024. The film has received positive reviews from critics, who praised the animation, writing, and voice performances, particularly Sean as Ken Sato.

== Plot ==
Professional baseball player Kenji "Ken" Sato returns home to Japan, despite being on the verge of winning a championship in the United States. Reporter Ami Wakita attributes his sudden departure to rumors of unfinished family business, but in reality, it is because his father, professor Hayao Sato, is a silver giant extraterrestrial called the Ultra, and because Ken inherited his father's Ultra powers, he became the giant superhero dubbed "Ultraman" and reluctantly had to accept Ultraman's mantle of facing kaiju to keep them in check. After a battle with the kaiju Neronga, Ken feels underappreciated after complaints from citizens, and vents he never wanted to be Ultraman while reminiscing about his mother Emiko, who has recently gone missing.

Dr. Onda, the chief officer of the Kaiju Defense Force (KDF), who harbors a grudge against the Ultra and kaiju, monitors a transport team delivering a secret package, at the same time Ken has his first game. However, the team are brought down near the stadium by the female bird-like kaiju named Gigantron, and Ken ends up fighting both her and pursuing KDF forces. Gigantron loses consciousness on top of the package, which is revealed to be her egg that then hatches into an infant Gigantron, forcing Ultraman to take her with him before the KDF kills her.

As an infant Gigantron imprints on him as her parent, Ken reluctantly raises her with help from his AI (artificial intelligence) assistant Mina, slowly becoming attached to her over time. Unwilling to accept his father's help due to their estranged relationship, Ken begins to struggle with his career and parental duties. He reaches out to Ami, a parent herself, to ask her how she deals with parenthood, and she tells him that, despite the struggles, it can be rewarding.

One night, Ken drops out of an interview with Ami after an infant Gigantron escapes into Tokyo, and Onda demands that he hand her over. However, he refuses and accidentally injures an infant Gigantron's shoulder while trying to save her. He takes her home and finally contacts Sato for help, who heals her and also names her Emi after his wife; he then aids Ken in raising her.

Onda reveals to the KDF's captain his plan to use Emi's echolocation to find the undiscovered kaiju island and eliminates all kaiju, which he justifies as a means to an end to protect humanity after his family was killed in a kaiju/Ultra incident. At a family cabin, Ken and Sato reconcile their relationship now that Ken understands the struggle of being a parent and Ultraman. However, Emi enters a pupal stage as the KDF find and attack them, injuring Sato. At home, Ken places him in a healing tube as Emi hatches from her cocoon, having grown wings. She hears the calls of her birth mother across Tokyo Bay and flies towards her.

Soon after, the KDF attacks Ken's home, destroying Mina and causing Sato's tube to disappear into the sea. Ultraman tracks down Emi to the middle of Tokyo Bay, where they encounter Gigantron, who was turned into a cyborg by the KDF. As Ken loses his concentration on his Ultra energy and reverts to his human form, he is saved by Sato, who returns as the original Ultraman, dubbed "Ultradad". Emi manages to break the KDF's control over Gigantron as Onda transforms a KDF craft into a giant mecha and battles Ultraman, Ultradad, and the kaiju, blaming Ultradad for the death of his family. Onda is defeated, but triggers a self-destruct sequence that kills him as Ultraman risks his life creating a barrier to prevent the explosion from reaching the city.

Later, Ami finally interviews Ken, who survived despite his shoulder being injured, and notes he has matured recently, which he attributes to his family. He shares a voicemail from Emiko expressing her hope that he will reconcile with his father and that their decisions as parents came from a place of love to prepare him for life. Later, Ken and Sato manage to find the kaiju island with help from Emi and Gigantron.

In a mid-credits scene, Emiko contacts Ken for help, as she is revealed to be stuck on the Ultra's home planet in Nebula M78.

== Voice cast ==
| Characters | English | Japanese |
|---|---|---|
| Kenji "Ken" Sato/Ultraman | Christopher Sean | Yuki Yamada |
| Hayao Sato/Ultradad | Gedde Watanabe | Fumiyo Kohinata |
| Emiko Sato/Mina | Tamlyn Tomita | Ayumi Tsunematsu |
| Dr. Onda | Keone Young | Fumihiko Tachiki |
| Ami Wakita | Julia Harriman | Akari Hayami |
| Oba Wakita | Karen Maruyama | Hiroko Sakurai |
| Captain Aoshima | Lee Shorten | Takaya Aoyagi |
| Coach Shimura | Artt Butler | Taiten Kusunoki |
| Ito | François Chau | |
| Kubo | Robert Yasumura | Yu Kitada |
| Chiho Wakita | Mila O'Malley | Chii Gojo |
| Mrs. Onda | Brittany Ishibashi | |
| Akiko Onda | Veronica Lapke | Kanae Amano |

Frank Buckley, Artt Butler, Vic Chao, Francois Chau, Brittany Ishibashi, Paul Nakauchi, Bret Marnell, and Jon Ohye provide additional voices.

== Production ==
The film, inspired by the character of the same name, began as an original idea developed by director Shannon Tindle. He conceived it while working as a character designer on Foster's Home for Imaginary Friends in the mid-to-late 2000s. Tindle further developed the film, writing a script and creating art at Sony Pictures Animation from 2016 to 2018; at the time, the plot would have followed "a billionaire forced to grow up when he takes on the orphaned children of his former foe." After leaving Sony, Tindle moved to Netflix Animation to produce the live-action/animation hybrid series Lost Ollie with fellow Sony Animation director Peter Ramsey, where he had the opportunity to repurpose the plot for his film to fit with the Ultraman IP.

The project was announced as a Netflix exclusive in May 2021, with Tindle and John Aoshima to co-direct and co-write the film with Marc Haimes (Tindle and Haimes previously co-wrote Kubo and the Two Strings), Tom Knott to produce, Lisa Poole to co-produce, and Industrial Light & Magic to animate the film. In July 2022, Netflix released an image teasing the film's animation style and Ultraman design.

== Marketing ==
=== Merchandise ===
On June 12, 2023, Tsuburaya and Tsuburaya Fields Media & Pictures Entertainment appointed Bandai Namco Toys & Collectibles America as the master toy licensee for the Ultraman series in North America with select products being available in South America and Europe which includes said film alongside future television entries and legacy entries which will all be released under the Bandai and Bandai Spirits brands respectively.

== Release ==
In October 2023, Tindle shared via Twitter a first-look image of Ultraman and the film's official title, Ultraman: Rising, teasing an announcement for Geeked Week 2023. In November 2023, the film's voice cast and first trailer were unveiled during Geeked Week 2023, targeting a 2024 release on Netflix. Ultraman: Rising premiered at the Annecy International Animation Film Festival on June 12, 2024. It was followed by its worldwide release on Netflix on June 14, 2024.

== Reception ==
=== Critical response ===
On the review aggregator website Rotten Tomatoes, 86% of 49 critics' reviews are positive, with an average rating of 7.2/10. The website's consensus reads: "Ultraman: Rising adds an interesting wrinkle of childrearing to the franchise's high-octane formula, making for a colorful romp fit for the whole family." Metacritic, which uses a weighted average, assigned the film a score of 66 out of 100, based on 14 critics, indicating "generally favorable" reviews.

=== Accolades ===
| Award | Date of ceremony | Category | Recipient(s) | Result | Ref. |
|---|---|---|---|---|---|
| Annie Awards | February 8, 2025 | Best Animated Feature | Ultraman: Rising | Nominated | |
| Annie Awards | February 8, 2025 | Outstanding Achievement for Animated Effects in an Animated Production | Vishal Patel, Goncalo Cabaca, Nicholas Yoon Joo Kuang, Zheng Yong Oh, and Pei-Zhi Huang | Nominated | |
| Annie Awards | February 8, 2025 | Outstanding Achievement for Production Design in an Animated Feature Production | Ultraman: Rising Production Design Team | Nominated | |
| Annie Awards | February 8, 2025 | Outstanding Achievement for Editorial in a Feature Production | William M. Steinberg, Nik Siefke, Ryan Sommer, Kaye Speare, and Bret Marnell | Nominated | |
| Children's and Family Emmy Awards | March 1–2, 2026 | Outstanding Animated Special | Kei Minamitani, Masahiro Onda, Takayuki Tsukagoshi, Tom Knott, Lisa M. Poole, Marc Haimes, Shannon Tindle and John Aoshima | Won | |
| Children's and Family Emmy Awards | March 1–2, 2026 | Outstanding Sound Mixing and Sound Editing for an Animated Program | Gary A. Rizzo, Brian Chumney, Samson Neslund, Jamey Scott, Christopher Manning, John Cucci, Dan O'Connell, Rich Quinn, Randy Thom and Leff Lefferts | Won | |
| Children's and Family Emmy Awards | March 1–2, 2026 | Outstanding Original Song for a Children’s or Young Teen Program | Trey Cambell, Alicia Creti and Spencer Stewart for "No Better" | Nominated | |
| Children's and Family Emmy Awards | March 1–2, 2026 | Outstanding Individual Achievement in Animation - Character Animation | James Saunders | Won | |
| Hollywood Professional Association | November 7, 2024 | Outstanding Color Grading – Animated Theatrical Feature | Maxine Gervais | Nominated | |
| Hollywood Professional Association | November 7, 2024 | Outstanding Visual Effects - Animated Feature | Sean M. Murphy, Stefan Drury, Hayden Jones, Mathieu Vig, and Kyle Winkelman | Won | |
| North Dakota Film Society | January 13, 2025 | Best Animated Feature | Shannon Tindle, Tom Knott, and Lisa M. Poole | Nominated | |
| Visual Effects Society Awards | February 11, 2025 | Outstanding Visual Effects in an Animated Feature | Hayden Jones, Sean M. Murphy, Shannon Tindle, Mathieu Vig | Nominated | |
| Visual Effects Society Awards | February 11, 2025 | Outstanding Effects Simulations in an Animated Feature | Goncalo Cabaca, Zheng Yong Oh, Nicholas Yoon Joo Kuang, Praveen Boppana | Nominated | |
