= Shannon Tindle =

American animator and director

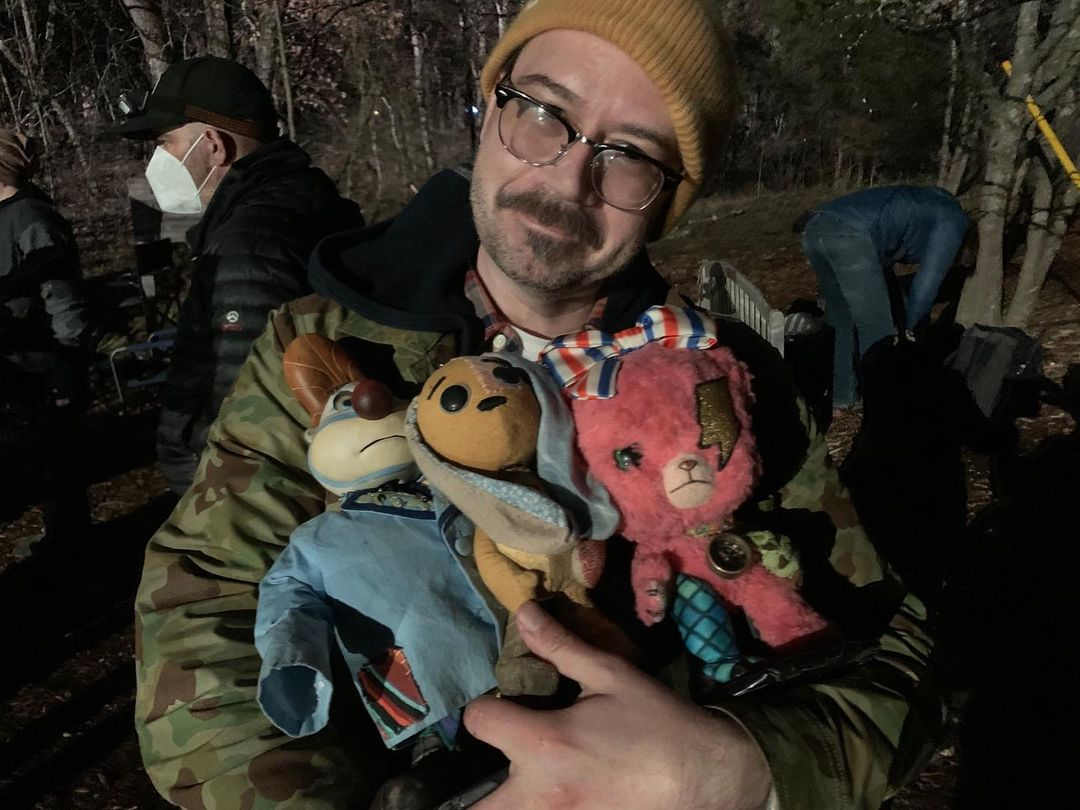
- Tindle on the set of Lost Ollie in 2022.
- Born: Christopher Shannon Tindle; Shepherdsville, Kentucky, U.S.
- Other name: C. Shannon Tindle
- Education: California Institute of the Arts
- Occupations: Screenwriter; Character Designer

Christopher Shannon Tindle is an American animator, storyboard artist, television writer, screenwriter, and film director. Tindle's work on the television series Foster's Home for Imaginary Friends received an Annie Award nomination in 2005 for Best Character Design in an Animated Television Production. Later, at the 58th Primetime Emmy Awards in 2006, he won the Emmy Award for Outstanding Individual Achievement in Animation for "Go Goo Go", while the episode was also nominated for Outstanding Animated Program (for Programming Less Than One Hour).

Tindle worked as a character designer on Sony Pictures Animation's The Emoji Movie; DreamWorks Animation' The Croods, as a story developer; and Laika's Kubo and the Two Strings, which he originally developed with his wife Megan before leaving the project over creative differences.

Currently, Tindle works at Netflix, where he adapted William Joyce's Ollie’s Odyssey into the miniseries Lost Ollie. He most recently directed a CG-animated Ultraman feature film titled Ultraman: Rising for Netflix Animation.

== Work ==
=== Character designer ===
==== TV shows ====
- Static Shock (2000) 2 episodes
- The Fairly OddParents (2002–2003) 4 episodes
- Samurai Jack (2003) 1 episode
- The Proud Family (2002; 2005) 2 episodes
- Foster's Home for Imaginary Friends (2005–2008) 11 episodes, supervising (2005–2006) 8 episodes
- Re-Animated (2006) (TV Movie)
- Foster's Home for Imaginary Friends: Destination Imagination (2008) (TV Movie)
- The Powerpuff Girls Rule! (2008) (TV Movie)

==== Films ====
- Eight Crazy Nights (2002)
- Curious George (2006)
- Coraline (2009)
- The Croods (2013)
- Turbo (2013)
- Kubo and the Two Strings (2016)
- The Emoji Movie (2017)
- The Boss Baby: Family Business (2021)
- Paws of Fury: The Legend of Hank (2022)
- Ultraman: Rising (2024)

=== Storyboard Artist ===
- Kubo and the Two Strings (2016)

=== Writer ===
- Foster's Home for Imaginary Friends (2006–2007) 3 episodes
- Kubo and the Two Strings (2016)
- Lost Ollie (2022)
- Ultraman: Rising (2024)

=== Visual Development Artist ===
- Mr. Peabody & Sherman (2014)

=== Other ===
- Samurai Jack (2003) (property designer)
