= The Scarecrow (2013 film) =

- Directed by: Brandon Oldenburg; Limbert Fabian
- Produced by: Iddo Lampton Enochs, Jr.; William Joyce
- Edited by: Calvin O'Neal, Jr.
- Music by: Fiona Apple ("Pure Imagination")
- Production company: Moonbot Studios
- Release date: September 11, 2013
- Running time: 3:23
- Country: United States
- Language: English

The Scarecrow is a 2013 animated short film and advertisement by the American restaurant chain Chipotle Mexican Grill. The film features Fiona Apple singing a cover version of "Pure Imagination", originally performed by Gene Wilder as Willy Wonka in the 1971 film Willy Wonka & the Chocolate Factory.

== Description ==
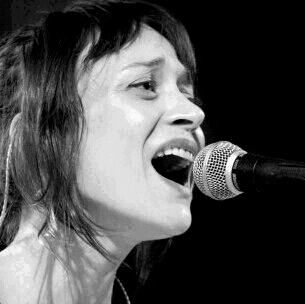
Fiona Apple (pictured in 2012) performs "Pure Imagination".

In a dystopian world named the City of Plenty, the main character, Scarecrow, starts work at the "smoke-spewing" Crow Foods Factory. He sees a tube extracting a substance labeled "100% Beef-ish", but being marketed to consumers as "all natural". He then witnesses a robotic crow named Crowbot, injecting a chicken with green fluid to promote expansion, followed by cows being held captive in small metal boxes while machines continuously milk the cows forcefully at Downtown Plenty. Scarecrow returns to his small farm, seemingly upset by what he witnessed during the workday. He picks a red pepper, which inspires him to harvest other vegetables and open a burrito stand in the city. Above his stand is a banner that reads "Cultivate a Better World".

The animated film features a cover version of "Pure Imagination" (Leslie Bricusse, Anthony Newley) by Fiona Apple, a song originally performed by Gene Wilder as Willy Wonka in the film Willy Wonka & the Chocolate Factory (1971), itself an adaptation of Roald Dahl's book, Charlie and the Chocolate Factory (1964). According to the Los Angeles Times, Apple's performance "scores scenes of dark devastation" and offers "stark contrast between the world of pure imagination of the lyrics" and the animals being processed. In the film, when Scarecrow returns home from work and picks a red pepper, the song transitions from "mournful" and "menacing" to a "happier" tone. Apple released the recording on iTunes, with proceeds benefiting the nonprofit organization, Chipotle Cultivation Foundation.

The Scarecrow ends with a brief teaser for a mobile app game available for iPhones and iPads, where the player can take down the fictional Crow Foods Factory. In a different version, a singer sings a parody of the song talking about the film as an advertisement and how they made it. Chipotle described the film as a "companion" piece to the game.

== Production ==
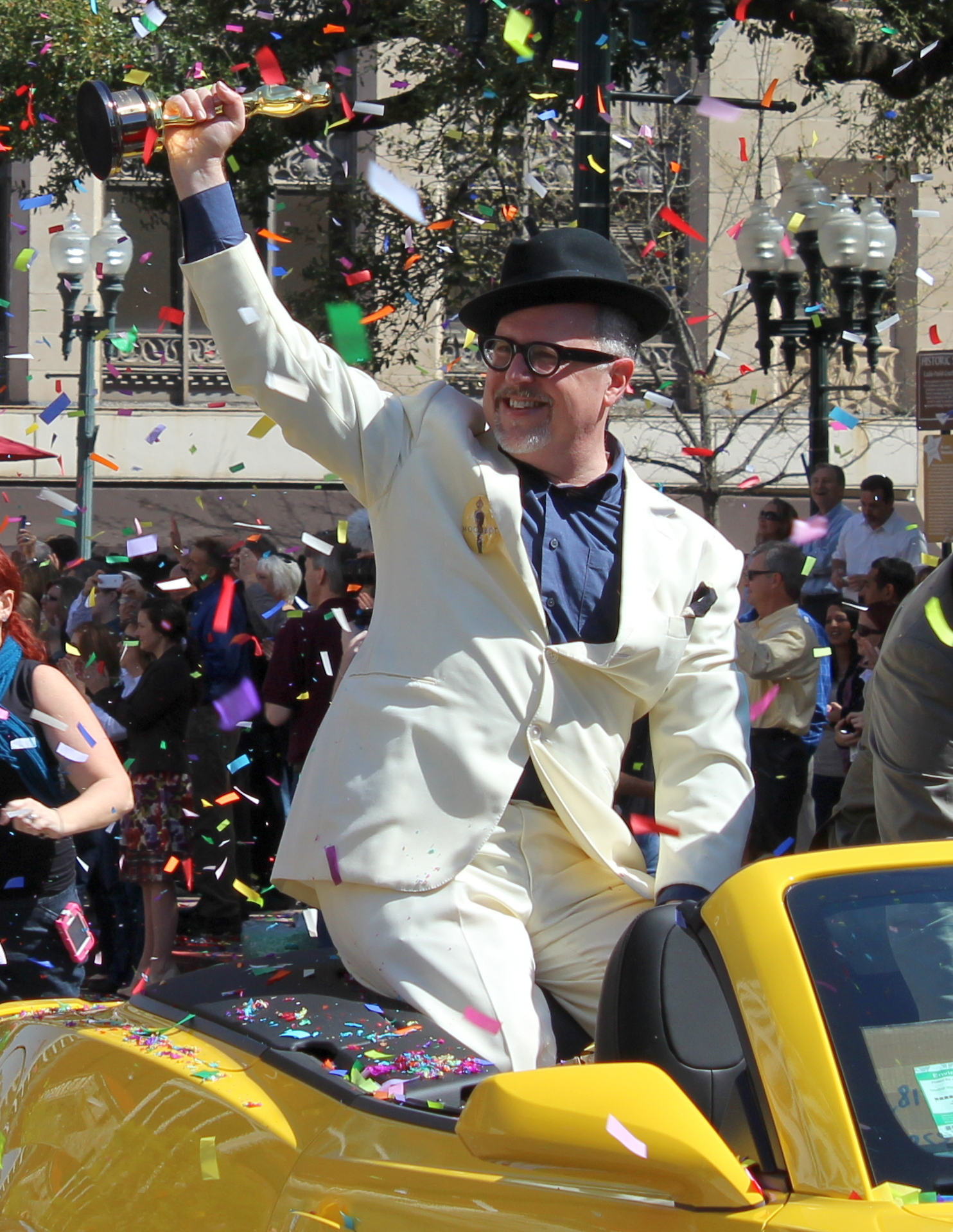
William Joyce in 2012

Chief Marketing Officer Mark Crumpacker stated that because his company "is on a mission to change the way the world thinks of and eats fast food," they wished to inform the public about how the food they eat is raised. Brand Voice Lead William Espey added that they wanted to create "this experience, this film and mobile game that would help us support that mission." Crumpacker also stated that the film depicts the "elaborate facade that's been created by the industrial food producers," who have done a "very good job of creating a rosy picture of their industry." The film reflects Chipotle's marketing strategy of avoiding television advertising; the company's goal is to come across as an alternative to factory farming and a more "highbrow" option over other fast food restaurants.

The Scarecrow was animated by Moonbot Studios, a small firm co-founded by William Joyce and Brandon Oldenburg that won the Academy Award for Best Animated Short Film in 2012. Moonbot liked Chipotle's food and ethos and created a video centered around scarecrows, which "normally protect food," but in this film, they protect "something we call food, but it's something that seriously overproduced on a dramatic scale... which is not that far from the truth." Co-directors Oldenburg and Limbert Fabian found inspiration from Willy Wonka & the Chocolate Factory, as well as from Fritz Lang's 1927 film Metropolis.

Chipotle originally selected Frank Ocean to perform "Pure Imagination" for the commercial, but he asked to be removed after the chain declined to remove its logo from the spot. He was ultimately replaced by Fiona Apple. In March 2014, Chipotle sued Ocean for the $212,500 advance that they had paid him to perform in the commercial. The lawsuit was dismissed later that month after Ocean repaid the advance in full.

== Release and reception ==
The short film was released on September 11, 2013. By September 19, it had been viewed 5.5 million times on YouTube.

The Scarecrow has been praised as innovative marketing and a "beautiful" work of art. AdWeek felt that the effective animation and Apple's voice "connects the viewer emotionally to the story," but felt that it was "not quite as magical" as Chipotle's similarly themed "Back to the Start" video. The Los Angeles Times' Randall Roberts called the film surreal, direct and "visually magnetic", and wrote that "the song as covered by Apple is gorgeous, filled with electronic flourishes and rococo arrangements. The images imbue her version with a melancholy, but, taken on its own, the song shimmers." Slate's Matthew Yglesias complimented the film's animation and music, and called the scene in which cows are seen in small crates "the most poignant moment you've ever witnessed in fast food marketing". He wrote that, if Chipotle's goal was to create "high-quality high-impact stuff that really gets attention and is designed to be memorable", the company was successful. Marketing reporter Bruce Horovitz, contributing for USA Today, named it the fifth best advertisement of the year.

The film won the Daytime Emmy Award for Outstanding New Approaches – Original Daytime Program or Series and for Outstanding Directing in an Animated Program at the 41st Daytime Emmy Awards. It also won the Grand Prix at the Cannes Lions in June 2014.

== See also ==
- Agribusiness
- Agricultural marketing
- Animal welfare
- Industrial agriculture (animals, crops)
- List of animation shorts
