= MOTM (disambiguation) =

MOTM is a modular synthesizer by Synthesis Technology.

MOTM may also refer to:

- Man of the match, also known as player of the match

== See also ==
- Man on the Moon (disambiguation)
