= America Now (disambiguation) =

The name America Now may refer to:

- America Now, an American syndicated television program that debuted in 2010
- The Jesse Kelly Show, a syndicated radio talk show formerly titled America Now
- Kudlow & Cramer, a CNBC program formerly titled America Now
- America Now: the Anthropology of a Changing Culture, a 1981 book by Marvin Harris republished in 1987 as Why Nothing Works: The Anthropology of Daily Life
