= The Fantastic Flying Books of Mr. Morris Lessmore =

- Poster
- Directed by: William Joyce; Brandon Oldenburg
- Written by: William Joyce
- Produced by: Lampton Enochs; Alissa Kantrow; Trish Farnsworth-Smith
- Music by: John Hunter, BREED
- Production company: Moonbot Studios
- Release date: January 30, 2011 (Santa Barbara)
- Running time: 15 minutes
- Country: United States

The Fantastic Flying Books of Mr. Morris Lessmore is a 2011 animated short film directed by William Joyce and Brandon Oldenburg, and produced by Moonbot Studios in Shreveport, Louisiana. Described as an "allegory about the curative powers of story," the film centers on bibliophile Lessmore and his custodianship of a magical library of flying books. It was created using computer animation, miniatures and traditional hand-drawn techniques.

After winning over a dozen film festivals, the film was awarded the Best Animated Short Film at the 84th Academy Awards. An official iPad app based on the film was also released in the Apple App Store. This however requires updating as it does not work with the current iOS. A book adaptation was released in late 2012.

== About ==
Morris Lessmore starts off on a balcony in the French Quarter of New Orleans writing a memoir. Suddenly a storm strikes, blowing Morris's writing out of his book and blowing him off the balcony. While Morris frantically grabs for his book, the storm blows away the buildings.

After the storm, Morris finds the city and its residents devastated. He walks through the streets strewn with book pages and into the countryside. There he sees a woman fly past, magically suspended by flying books which she is holding with ribbons. She sends one of the books down to Morris. The book's pages flip back and forth to animate an illustration of Humpty Dumpty, who urges Morris to follow him. The flying book takes Morris to a library where other flying books live. Morris finds no humans there, but notices several portraits on a wall, one of which is the woman he had seen.

Morris then becomes the keeper of the library. He takes care of the books, even saving the life of an early French edition of Jules Verne's From the Earth to the Moon after it suffers a catastrophic injury falling from a shelf. (Note: The large book on which Morris sleeps is the same title; its inclusion may reference the studio's name "Moonbot". The library also includes Moon globes and in one scene the Moon is featured prominently in a window.) He also gives out books to those who visit the library from the city still suffering from the effects of the storm. Eventually Morris begins to rewrite his memoir, sharing passages with the flying books who gather around him on the grassy hill opposite the library.

Years later Morris, now an old man, finally completes the book. Satisfied with his life's work, he closes the book and heads for the door. The flying books swirl about him and Morris becomes young again. He then flies away, carried by flying books like the woman earlier. As he departs, his book, which had earlier been an ordinary book, becomes a flying book like the others, and returns to the library. Just then, a young girl arrives. She sits down on the steps of the library and begins to read Morris's book as the flying books gather around. The final scene shows Morris's portrait added to the picture wall in the library.

== Inspiration ==
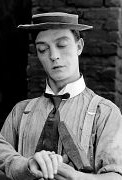
Buster Keaton wearing a pork pie hat

The book was inspired by William Morris, children's books publisher at HarperCollins and Joyce's mentor. Joyce wrote a story about a man who gives his life to books when he was on an airplane flight to visit Morris. Joyce read the story to Morris, who died a few days after that.

Morris Lessmore was visually modeled after the silent film actor Buster Keaton. The film drew particular inspiration from the storm scene in Keaton's 1928 film Steamboat Bill, Jr. and the tornado from The Wizard of Oz (1939). Also an inspiration was the real-life Hurricane Katrina which devastated New Orleans in 2005.

Like The Wizard of Oz, the film utilizes the contrast of color and black-and-white as a narrative device. In this case, the black-and-white represents the sadness and despair brought about by the storm.

== Reception ==
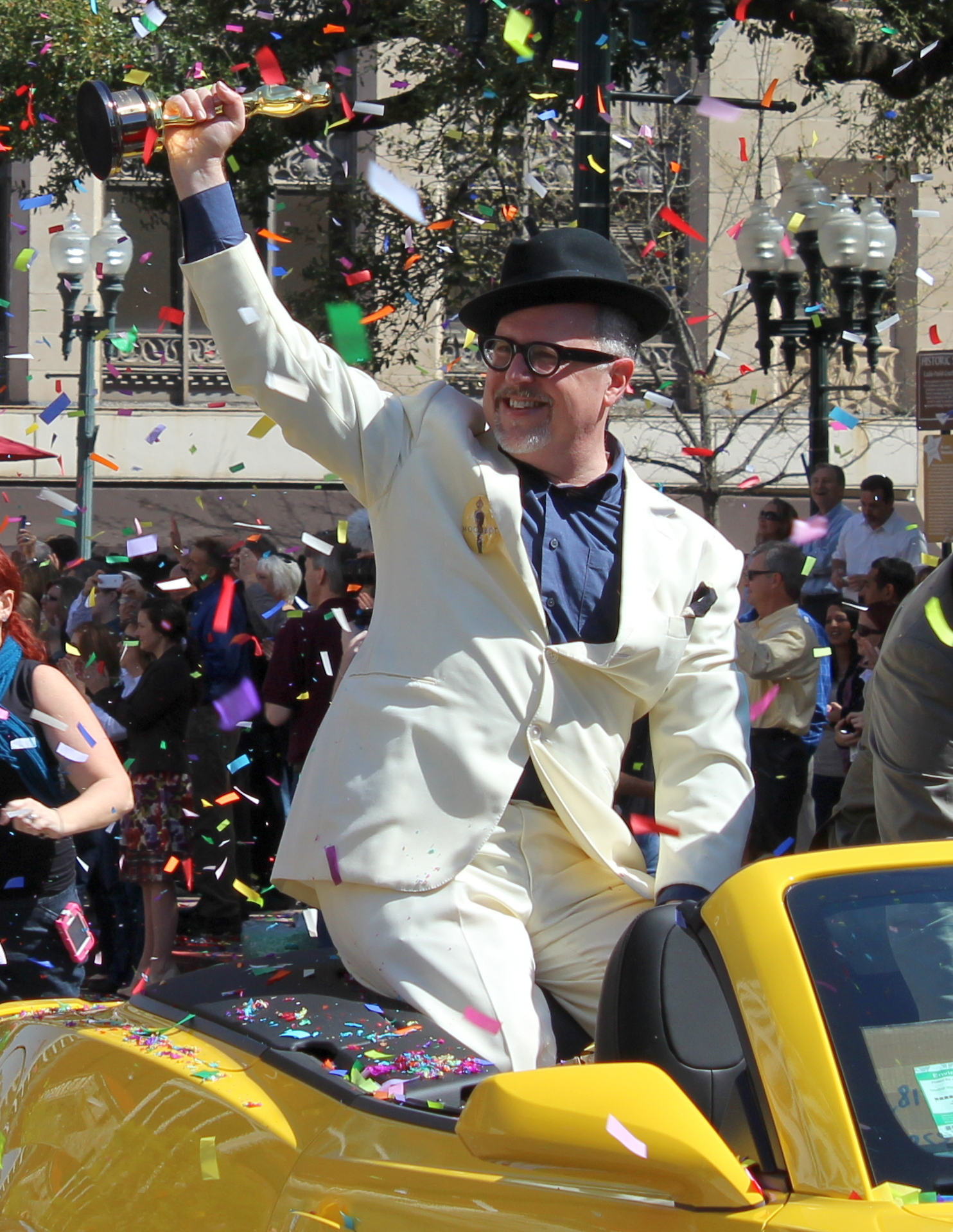
Writer and co-director William Joyce holding the Academy Award won by the film in 2012

The film has received 14 awards, including the Audience Award at the Austin Film Festival, "Best Animated Short" at the Cinequest Film Festival and the Academy Award for Best Animated Short Film.

Louisiana Governor Bobby Jindal congratulated Shreveport-based animation studio Moonbot Studios for winning an Oscar at the 84th Annual Academy Awards in Hollywood. "Louisiana celebrates this Oscar win with the exceptionally talented and creative staff of Moonbot Studios in Shreveport," Jindal said. "We're proud that Louisiana residents and a Louisiana-based company created this groundbreaking work that pays homage to a love of books and perseverance through a love of learning.

== See also ==
- Film industry in Louisiana
- Silent film
- 2011 in film
