= Christopher Sean =

American actor (born 1985)

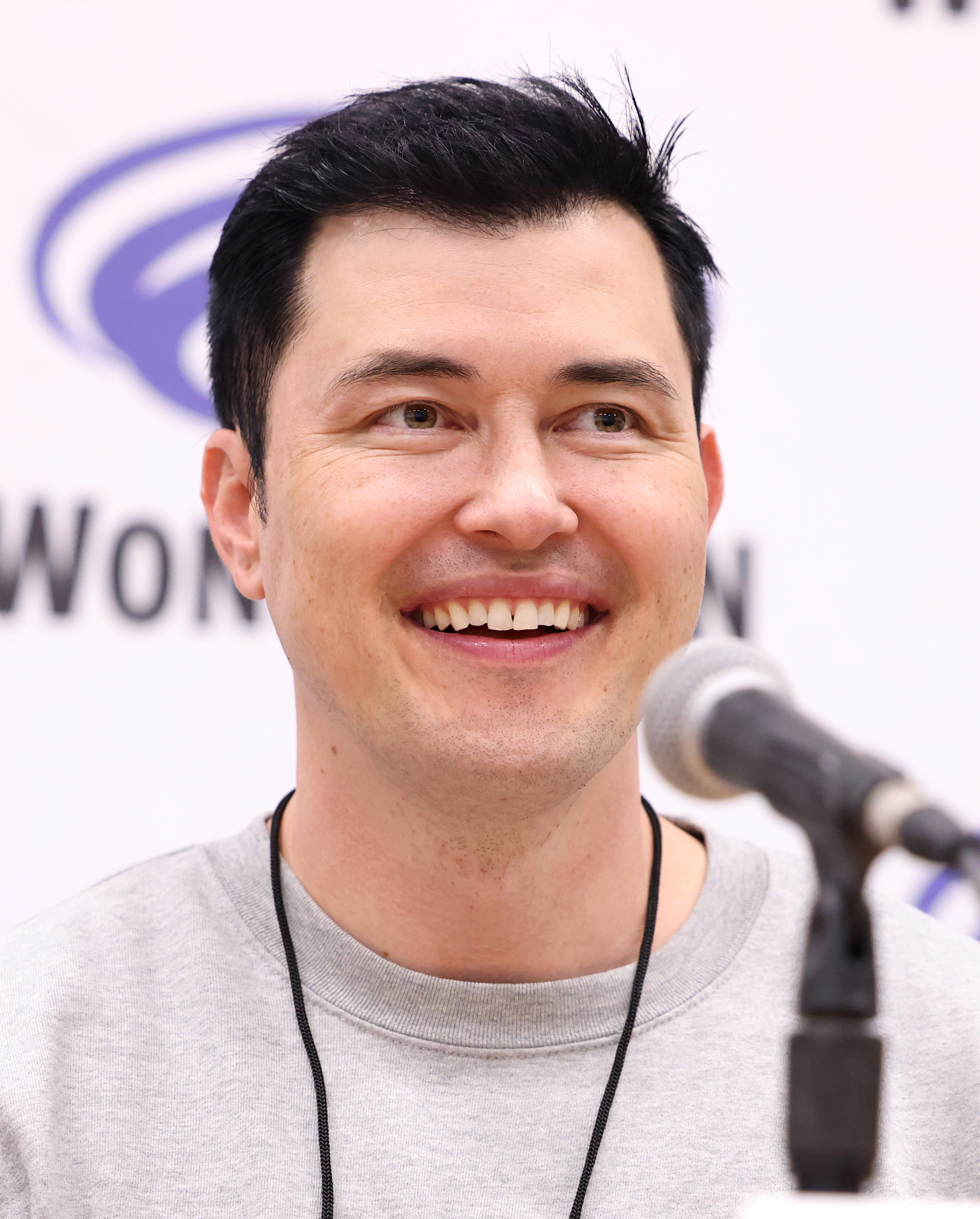
- Sean in 2025
- Born: Christopher Sean Friel; October 25, 1985 (age 41); Oak Harbor, Washington, U.S.
- Other names: Christopher Friel; Chris Friel
- Occupation: Actor
- Years active: 2010–present
- Known for: The Lizzie Bennet Diaries; Days of Our Lives; Hawaii Five-0
- Title: Mr. Asia USA (2007)

Christopher Sean Friel (born October 25, 1985) is an American actor known for his role as Paul Narita on the NBC soap opera Days of Our Lives, for which he received a Daytime Emmy Award nomination in 2026. He previously played Bing Lee in the critically acclaimed web series The Lizzie Bennet Diaries and the recurring villain Gabriel Waincroft on CBS's Hawaii Five-0 and as Brandon in You. Sean also gained recognition for his lead voice over roles such as Kazuda Xiono in the cartoon series Star Wars Resistance, Dick Grayson/Nightwing in the game Gotham Knights, and as Kenji Sato/Ultraman in the animated Netflix film Ultraman: Rising.

== Personal life ==
Christopher Sean Friel was born on October 25, 1985, in Oak Harbor, Washington to Sayuri and Patrick Friel. He has two sisters, Candis and Melody. Sean grew up mainly in Southern California. Sean is Japanese on his mother's side and Irish, Spanish and German on his father's side.

Sean grew up in the military because his father was in the Navy. When Sean's father was stationed away from home, he put himself on video reading books to his children and Sean's mother would record videos of the kids and reply back. As a result, Sean was always very comfortable in front of the camera and those experiences inspired him to try acting. Growing up, Sean had a big poster of Bruce Lee on his wall and admits there weren't many people for him to relate to in the entertainment industry. Sean speaks Japanese, which he picked up from his parents when his father was assigned to the USS Tripoli. Sean is trained in boxing, Taekwondo, wrestling, Jujutsu and mixed martial arts.

== Career ==
Sean said that he was working at Six Flags Hurricane Harbor in Valencia, California when he was first "discovered." He started doing modeling work, and in 2007 he won the Mr. Asia USA pageant. Sean earned a $1,500 cash prize and a one-year acting class at the Michael John Studio in Van Nuys, California.

Sean revealed that he struggled early on his career due to his mixed ethnicity, saying "I'm not Asian enough to play Asian roles and I'm not white enough to play white roles." He auditioned for ABC's daytime soap opera General Hospital, where he admitted to screwing up the audition due to his lack of experience. Sean has made appearances on Hollywood Heights, The Mindy Project, and the web series The Lizzie Bennet Diaries. In 2014, he began playing the recurring role of Gabriel Waincroft on CBS's Hawaii Five-0.

In October 2014, it was announced that Sean had joined the cast of Days of Our Lives as a contract cast member. His character, pro baseball player Paul Narita, comes out as gay and becomes involved in a love triangle with supercouple Will Horton and Sonny Kiriakis, and is the illegitimate son of longtime character John Black. Sean left the series in 2018, but reprised the role in the 2022 limited-run series Days of Our Lives: Beyond Salem.

Sean voiced lead character Kazuda Xiono in the animated series Star Wars Resistance.

In November 2020, Sean was cast in a recurring role on the third season of the Netflix psychological thriller series You.

== Filmography ==
Year	Title	Role	Notes	Source
2010	The Bold and the Beautiful	Waiter	2 episodes	
2010	King Eternal	Kele	Short film	
2012	Hollywood Heights	Solo dude #1	2 episodes	
2012	Back to Blue	Chris	Short film	
2012–2013	The Lizzie Bennet Diaries	Bing Lee	Main role; web series	
2013	Twiharder	JB Lycan	Lead role; parody of 2008 film Twilight	
2013	The Mindy Project	Frat Bro #2	Episode: "Frat Party"	
2013	Great American Dream	Frates	Film	
2014	Progress: Ask a Cam Harlot	Chance Von Thundermast	2 episodes	
2014	CineDopes	Yoga Student #3	Episode: "Ratinee"	
2014–2016	Hawaii Five-0	Gabriel Waincroft	Recurring role; 13 episodes	
2014–2018, 2023–2025	Days of Our Lives	Paul Narita	Series regular	
2017	Young Again	Frates		
2018–2020	Star Wars Resistance	Kazuda Xiono	Lead role; voice	
2019	Home Is Where the Killer Is	Kyle Hayes		
2021	You	Brandon	Recurring role; 4 episodes	
2021	Star Wars: Visions	Asu	The Village Bride; voice (English dub)	
2021	NCIS: Los Angeles	LAPD RHD Detective Jack Tanaka	Episode: "Fukushu"	
2022	Days of Our Lives: Beyond Salem	Paul Narita		
2024	Ultraman: Rising	Ken Sato/Ultraman	Voice	

=== Video games ===
Year	Title	Role	Notes	Source
2018	Epic Seven	Ludwig, Ken, Romann	Voice role	
2020	Fallout 76: Wastelanders	Dr. Bernard, Greg Goldstein, Lawrence Kessler, Cultist Priest, Raiders	Voice role	
2020	Ghost of Tsushima	Additional voices	Voice role	
2020	Marvel's Avengers	Additional voices	Voice role	
2022	Horizon Forbidden West	Arokkeh	Voice role	
2022	Gotham Knights	Dick Grayson / Nightwing	Voice and mocap performance	
2023	Like a Dragon Gaiden: The Man Who Erased His Name	Agent Enzen	Voice role	
2024	Like a Dragon: Infinite Wealth	Kazuki, additional voices	Voice role	
2024	Persona 3 Reload	Additional voices	Voice role	
2024	Suicide Squad: Kill the Justice League	Hiro Okamura/Toyman	Voice role	
2026	Yakuza Kiwami 3 & Dark Ties	Kazuki, additional voices	Voice role	

== Awards and nominations ==
List of awards and nominations
Year	Award	Category	Work	Result	Ref.
2013	Action On Film International Film Festival	Best Comedy	Twiharder	Nominated	
2013	Action On Film International Film Festival	Best Costumes	Twiharder	Nominated	
2013	Action On Film International Film Festival	Best Sound Design	Twiharder	Nominated	
2013	Action On Film International Film Festival	Best Spoof	Twiharder	Nominated	
2013	Action On Film International Film Festival	Best Special Effects Feature	Twiharder	Won	
2026	Daytime Emmy Award	Outstanding Guest Performer in a Drama Series	Days of Our Lives	Nominated	
