= Woman in the Moon (disambiguation) =

Woman in the Moon is a 1928 German science fiction silent film.

Woman in the Moon may also refer to:

- The Woman in the Moon, an Elizabethan era stage play
- Woman in the Moon (album), 1994 debut album by Chely Wright
- The Woman in the Moon, a Barbra Streisand song from the soundtrack of the 1976 film A Star is Born
- Woman in the Moon (1988 film), a romance film starring Greta Scacchi

== See also ==
- Moon goddess
- Girl in the Moon
- Man in the Moon (disambiguation)
