= Moon people =

Moon people may refer to

- Yuezhi, an ancient people of East Asia
- The Moon in science fiction, including inhabitants of the Moon

== See also ==
- Moon Man (disambiguation)
- Moonie (disambiguation)
- Moonies
