= Ollie's Odyssey =

2016 novel by William Joyce

- Author: William Joyce
- Language: English
- Publication date: 2016

Ollie's Odyssey is a 2016 children's book by William Joyce, published by Caitlyn Dlouhy Books of Atheneum Books, Simon & Schuster. It is middle grade literature.

== Plot and contents ==
In it, Billy, a 6 and one half year old boy, seeks to rescue his plush rabbit, Ollie, from Zozo, a clown. Ollie and Billy become separated, and Ollie gathers a team of allies to defeat Zozo.

According to Joyce, the words used by the characters are "a whole different kid language."

== Reception ==
Judy Christie of The News-Star wrote that the work had adult readers in addition to its intended audience.

Marybeth Kozikowski of Sachem Public Library in Holbrook, New York gave the book a positive review in School Library Journal.

Kirkus Reviews described the book as "Velveteen Rabbit and Toy Story meet Phantom of the Opera. For better or worse."

Publishers Weekly stated that the book has "irresistible illustrations and joyous wordplay", and "it's always clear that" the protagonists will prevail in the story line.

== Adaptations ==
- Lost Ollie
