= Moon Man =

Moon Man or Moonman may refer to:

== Entertainment ==
- Moon Man (album), an album by jazz saxophonist Charles Lloyd recorded in 1970
- Moon Man (novel), a 1966 children's book by Tomi Ungerer
  - Moon Man (2012 film), a film based on Ungerer's book
- Moon Man (character), a fictional pulp magazine character who appeared in Ten Detective Aces magazine
- "Moon-Man Newfie", a 1972 single by Canadian country music artist Stompin' Tom Connors
- "Moon Man", a 2021 song by Young Stoner Life and Young Thug featuring Kid Cudi from the album Slime Language 2
- Moon Man (2022 film), a Chinese science fiction comedy
- Moon Man the antagonist of the german children's novel Little Peter's Journey to the Moon and its 2021 film adapation moonbound

== People ==
- Moon Man, the nickname of baseball player Greg Minton
- Moon Man, the nickname of writer Ken Ring due to his predictions based on lunar cycles
- Moonman, an alias of Ferry Corsten
- Eric Moonman (1929–2017), British Labour politician

== Other uses ==
- Moon Man No Coast Pale Ale, a beer made by New Glarus Brewing Company
- Moonman, the MTV Video Music Award trophy fashioned after astronaut Buzz Aldrin
- Moon Man, a meme based on Mac Tonight

== See also ==
- Man on the Moon (disambiguation)
- Man in the Moon (disambiguation)
- Moon people (disambiguation)
