= Meet the Robinsons =

2007 animated Disney film

- Theatrical release poster
- Directed by: Stephen Anderson
- Screenplay by: Jon Bernstein; Michelle Spitz; Don Hall; Nathan Greno; Aurian Redson; Joe Mateo; Stephen Anderson
- Based on: A Day with Wilbur Robinson by William Joyce
- Produced by: Dorothy McKim
- Starring: Daniel Hansen; Jordan Fry; Wesley Singerman; Angela Bassett; Tom Selleck; Harland Williams; Laurie Metcalf; Nicole Sullivan; Adam West; Ethan Sandler; Tom Kenny; Stephen Anderson
- Edited by: Ellen Keneshea
- Music by: Danny Elfman
- Production company: Walt Disney Animation Studios
- Distributed by: Buena Vista Pictures Distribution (Note: Distributed under the Walt Disney Pictures banner.)
- Release dates: March 25, 2007 (El Capitan Theatre); March 30, 2007 (United States)
- Running time: 95 minutes
- Country: United States
- Language: English
- Budget: $150 million
- Box office: $170.5 million

Meet the Robinsons is a 2007 American animated science fiction comedy film produced by Walt Disney Animation Studios for Walt Disney Pictures and distributed by Buena Vista Pictures Distribution. Based on the 1990 children's book A Day with Wilbur Robinson by William Joyce, the film was directed by Stephen Anderson, and written by Anderson, Don Hall, Nathan Greno, Joe Mateo, Jon Bernstein, Michelle Spitz, and Aurian Redson, and stars the voices of Daniel Hansen and Jordan Fry, Wesley Singerman, Angela Bassett, Tom Selleck, Harland Williams, Laurie Metcalf, Nicole Sullivan, Adam West, Ethan Sandler, Tom Kenny, and Anderson. In the film, Lewis, an orphaned 12-year-old inventor, meets Wilbur Robinson, a young time-traveler who takes him to the future, before an incident wrecks Wilbur's time machine. Lewis agrees to help him fix the machine and ends up acquainted with Wilbur's eccentric family. Meanwhile, a mysterious man with a sentient bowler hat aims to sabotage Lewis' fate, and, by proxy, the future.

Development began in 2002, with production starting in 2004 under the working title A Day with Wilbur Robinson, with a release initially slated for 2006. Anderson developed a personal connection to the main character, Lewis, as he himself grew up as an orphan with no parents and was later adopted. Disney originally planned to adopt Joyce's style, but it was decided to slightly rework the style due to his involvement stylistically in Blue Sky Studios' Robots. The animation crew had the challenge to animate CG humans, being inspired by Pixar's The Incredibles. Inspiration for the film came from Disney animated classics, such as Alice in Wonderland, Cinderella, and Peter Pan, as well as Warner Bros. Cartoons, to capture a 1950s aesthetic. Disney's acquisition of Pixar in early 2006 led to nearly 60% of the film, including the villain and the ending, being scrapped and reworked. Danny Elfman composed the film's score, while artists such as Rufus Wainwright, Rob Thomas, The All-American Rejects, and They Might Be Giants contributed to its soundtrack.

Meet the Robinsons first premiered at the El Capitan Theatre in Los Angeles, California in the United States on March 25, 2007, and it was first released theatrically in the United States by Buena Vista Pictures Distribution on March 30, 2007. The film received generally positive reviews from critics, but it was a box office disappointment, grossing a total box office $170.5 million against a total budget of $150 million.

== Plot ==
Lewis is an orphaned 12-year-old boy who is an aspiring scientist and inventor. Despite his desire for a family, his energetic behavior and malfunctioning inventions frequently scare off prospective parents and exhaust his long-suffering roommate, Mike "Goob" Yagoobian. Frustrated by rejection, Lewis seizes on the idea of locating his birth mother, who left him at the orphanage when he was an infant. To this end, he invents a machine to scan his memories and display them, dubbing it the Memory Scanner.

Lewis takes the Memory Scanner to his school's science fair, where he meets Wilbur Robinson, a mysterious boy who claims to be from the future. Wilbur warns Lewis about a tall, lanky man wearing a bowler hat, nicknamed the "Bowler Hat Guy", who stole a time machine. During Lewis' presentation, the Bowler Hat Guy's hat robot, Doris, secretly sabotages the Memory Scanner, causing it to malfunction and throw the science fair into chaos. After a despondent Lewis leaves the fair, the Bowler Hat Guy steals the Memory Scanner and attempts to pitch it as his own to an invention company called InventCo. Labs, but fails as he does not know how to operate it.

Back at the orphanage, Wilbur attempts to motivate Lewis into fixing the Memory Scanner by taking him in a second time machine to the future, which is highly technologically advanced. Lewis, however, theorizes that he can simply use the time machine to go back and prevent his mother from giving him up; the boys crash the time machine as they argue. Wilbur asks Lewis to fix the time machine, and Lewis agrees on the condition that Wilbur take him to see his mother afterwards.

At Wilbur's house, Lewis meets the rest of the Robinson family, who are uniformly bizarre and idiosyncratic. Cornelius, Wilbur's father and inventor of the era's technologies, is absent on a business trip. Throughout the visit, the Robinsons emphasize Cornelius's motto of "Keep Moving Forward", encouraging Lewis to learn from his mistakes. Meanwhile, the Bowler Hat Guy arrives from the past and attempts to kidnap Lewis, first with a mind-controlled frog and then a Tyrannosaurus, but is foiled by the Robinsons. When Wilbur's mother, Franny, offers to adopt Lewis, Wilbur abruptly reveals Lewis is from the past, and Franny regretfully rescinds the offer. Wilbur then admits he lied to Lewis about taking him back to see his mother, causing Lewis to run off in disgust.

Bowler Hat Guy intercepts Lewis and offers to take him to his mother in exchange for repairing and demonstrating the Memory Scanner. Shortly after, the Bowler Hat Guy takes Lewis hostage and identifies himself as an adult Goob, who developed a grudge after Lewis's work on the Memory Scanner deprived Goob of sleep and led to him missing a game-winning catch at a Little League Baseball championship game, which in turn bittered him, driving any potential parents away. He also reveals that Cornelius is Lewis as an adult, making him Wilbur's father. Doris is a rogue decommissioned Robinson invention called a Helping Hat, and Goob teamed up with her to jointly take revenge on Lewis. Leaving Lewis in the future, Goob and Doris return to the past, successfully pitch the Memory Scanner, and begin mass producing Helping Hats. Doris then betrays Goob and uses the Helping Hats to enslave humanity, erasing Wilbur from existence and turning the future into a dystopia. Lewis repairs the second time machine and confronts Goob in the past, where he apologizes for his insensitivity and then erases Doris by vowing never to invent her. Goob accompanies Lewis back to the future, which is restored to its utopian state along with Wilbur. At Lewis's urging, Wilbur reluctantly offers for Goob to join the Robinson family, but Goob leaves in shame.

Cornelius arrives home and finally meets Lewis. Cornelius explains how the Memory Scanner started their successful career and persuades Lewis to return to the science fair. Wilbur surprises Lewis by taking him in the time machine back to the night when his mother left him at the orphanage. Lewis decides not to meet her, realizing that his true family is in the future, not the past.

Back in his own time, Lewis first awakens the young Goob at the baseball field so he can make the winning catch, averting his future as Bowler Hat Guy. At the science fair, Lewis successfully demonstrates the Memory Scanner on one of the judges, an InventCo. scientist who chooses to relive her wedding day; Lewis recognizes the groom as Bud Robinson, Cornelius's father. She and Bud subsequently adopt Lewis, with Bud nicknaming him "Cornelius". Emboldened by his future family's motto of "Keep Moving Forward," Lewis moves in with his new parents and begins his inventing career.

== Voice cast ==
- Jordan Fry and Daniel Hansen as Lewis, (Note: Both Daniel Hansen and Jordan Fry voiced Lewis. Hansen voiced Lewis at the beginning of the film's production, and when the studio needed Lewis' lines changed, they had Fry re-dub many scenes. Both Fry and Hansen are listed as voice actors for Lewis on Disney, Amazon, iTunes, and other official websites.) a 12-year-old orphaned boy genius who struggles to be adopted.
- Tom Selleck as Cornelius Robinson, Lewis' older self, Franny's husband, and Wilbur's father.
- Wesley Singerman as Wilbur Robinson, the fast-talking 13-year-old son of Franny and Cornelius Robinson.
- Stephen Anderson as:
  - The Bowler Hat Guy, a sinister but clumsy man from the future who seeks revenge on Lewis.
    - Matthew Josten as Mike "Goob" Yagoobian, the Bowler Hat Guy's younger self and Lewis' roommate.
  - Bud Robinson, Cornelius' adoptive father, Fritz and Joe's older brother, and Wilbur's grandfather.
  - Cousin Tallulah, Fritz and Petunia Robinson's daughter and Laszlo's sister.
- Harland Williams as Carl, the Robinson family's neurotic but loyal robot.
- Nicole Sullivan as Franny Robinson, Cornelius's wife, Wilbur's mother, and Gaston and Art Robinson's sister. She trains her frogs to sing in a band and is in charge of the family when Cornelius is not around.
  - Michaela Jill Murphy as young Franny
- Angela Bassett as Mildred Duffy, the motherly head of the Sixth Street Orphanage.
- Adam West as Art, a pizza delivery man with a superhero persona. He is Gaston and Franny's brother and Wilbur's uncle.
- Laurie Metcalf as Dr. Lucille Krunklehorn-Robinson, a hyper scientist at InventCo. Labs. She is Lewis' adoptive mother, Bud's wife, and Wilbur's grandmother.
- Tom Kenny as Mr. Willerstein, Lewis' science teacher.
- Ethan Sandler as:
  - Doris, a malicious robotic bowler hat designed by Cornelius Robinson to be a helping hat but expanded beyond its intelligence and now seeks revenge.
  - Fritz Robinson, Petunia Robinson's husband, Bud and Joe Robinson's brother, and Laszlo and Tallulah Robinson's father.
  - Aunt Petunia, a hand puppet who is Fritz Robinson's wife and Laszlo and Tallulah Robinson's mother.
  - Cousin Laszlo, Fritz and Petunia Robinson's son and Tallulah's brother.
  - Uncle Spike and Uncle Dimitri, twins who sit in potted plants in front of the Robinson household, arguing over whose doorbell visitors should ring. It is unknown who they are related to.
  - The unnamed CEO of InventCo
- Don Hall as:
  - Gaston, a stunt performer who is Franny and Art Robinson's brother and Wilbur's uncle.
  - Gym Coach
- Kelly Hoover as Aunt Billie, Joe Robinson's wife who likes trains.
- Tracey Miller-Zarneke as Lizzy, a gothic student from Lewis’ school who presents her fire ants at the science fair.
- Joe Mateo as Tiny, a Tyrannosaurus brought to the future by the Bowler Hat Guy who later becomes the Robinson family's pet dinosaur.
- Aurian Redson as Frankie the Frog, the lead singer of Franny's musical band of frogs.
  - Jamie Cullum as the singing voice of Frankie the Frog
- Paul Butcher as Stanley, a student from Lewis’ school who presents a Mount Vesuvius project at the science fair.
- Dara McGarry as:
  - InventCo Receptionist
  - Mrs. Harrington
- John H. H. Ford as Mr. Harrington
- Nathan Greno as Lefty, a one-eyed octopus and the Robinson family's butler.
- Joe Whyte as a reporter who interviews Lewis.

In addition, Joe Robinson is Wilbur's obese, silent uncle, Billie's husband, and Bud and Fritz's brother, who rides in an easy chair; an uncredited actor provides his whimpers. Also in the Robinson family is their dog, Buster, who wears glasses due to his insurance not covering contacts.

== Production ==
=== Beginnings ===
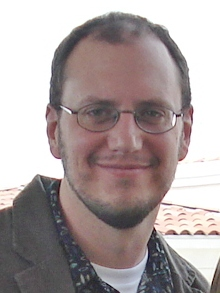
Director Stephen Anderson at the film's premiere

In 1990, prior to the original publication of A Day with Wilbur Robinson, William Joyce became acquainted with film producer Bill Borden, who was in the middle of shooting The Man in the Moon in Joyce's native Shreveport, Louisiana. Upon seeing the proofs for the book, Borden was convinced that the book would make for a great Disney movie. He convinced Joyce to write a treatment for a film adaptation, and within a week, the project was optioned by Walt Disney Pictures as a potential live-action film. Over the next couple of years, William Joyce wrote several drafts for the film, as Disney considered several directors, including Steven Spielberg, George Miller, Peter Jackson, Francis Ford Coppola, and Diane Keaton. Having difficulty securing a director, in addition to potential budgetary issues, the film would soon enter turnaround at the studio for a couple of years. However, Leo Chu, an executive at Walt Disney Feature Animation took interest in the project, and convinced Joyce to bring the project over there to develop it as an animated film.

=== Pre-production ===
Pre-production of the film was first unveiled during SIGGRAPH 2001, where a character resembling Lewis was showcased in a tech demo for "Project Gemini". Originally titled A Day with Wilbur Robinson, production began in June 2004 and was scheduled for a 2006 release. During the film's production, Walt Disney Animation Studios' storyboard artist Stephen Anderson decided to direct the film due to his connection to Lewis, since they both grew up adopted.

=== Animation and visual style ===
The studio planned to adapt Joyce's style to the film, but the style was slightly reworked due to his stylistic involvement in Blue Sky Studios' Robots. While still taking cues from his retro style, influenced by everything from Technicolor films to '40s architectural design, the crew also took inspiration from the company Apple. Unlike their previous film, Chicken Little, which starred CG animals, the animation crew had the challenge of animating CG humans. They took inspiration from Pixar's The Incredibles when animating the characters. They also took inspiration from Disney animated classics, such as Alice in Wonderland, Cinderella, and Peter Pan, and from Warner Bros. Cartoons to capture the 1950s aesthetic.

=== Pixar buyout and production changes ===
While the film was in production, The Walt Disney Company announced on January 24, 2006, that it would be acquiring Pixar, and as a result, John Lasseter became the chief creative officer of both Pixar and Walt Disney Feature Animation. When he saw an early film screening, he told Anderson that he did not find the villain scary or threatening enough and suggested he make some changes. Almost 60% of the film had been scrapped and redone ten months later. The villain had improved and was given a new sidekick, a dinosaur chase had been added, and the ending was changed. In 2007, before the film released, Lasseter changed the name of Walt Disney Feature Animation to Walt Disney Animation Studios, making this film the first to display the Walt Disney Animation Studios logo at the beginning; previous animated films from Walt Disney Animation Studios had only displayed the Walt Disney Pictures logo.

Jim Carrey was originally offered the role of Bowler Hat Guy but he declined when he signed to star in The Number 23.

== Soundtrack ==
Meet the Robinsons

Soundtrack album by Various artists
- Released: March 27, 2007
- Length: 52:46
- Label: Walt Disney
- Producer: Danny Elfman

Singles from Meet the Robinsons
- 1. "Kids of the Future" Released: February 28, 2007; 2. "Little Wonders" Released: March 13, 2007

The soundtrack album was released by Walt Disney Records on March 27, 2007. It includes four original songs written for the film, performed by Rufus Wainwright, Jamie Cullum, and Rob Thomas. Contributors to the album beyond the Danny Elfman score include another track by Wainwright ("The Motion Waltz (Emotional Commotion)"), The All-American Rejects ("The Future Has Arrived"), They Might Be Giants ("There's a Great Big Beautiful Tomorrow"), and the Jonas Brothers ("Kids of the Future", a reworking of "Kids in America"). The track "Little Wonders", recorded by Thomas, reached number 5 on the Billboard AC chart and the top 20 in Australia and Canada.

The song "This Much Fun" by Cowboy Mouth, which was featured in the trailer, was not featured in the film or on the soundtrack. The song "There's a Great Big Beautiful Tomorrow" was originally from the Disneyland attraction General Electric's Carousel of Progress which was located in Tomorrowland.

The Japanese version uses "Hitomi Hiraite" by Mitsuki Takahata as the theme song.

All music is composed by Danny Elfman, except as noted.

No.	Title	Artist	Length
1.	"Another Believer"	Rufus Wainwright	4:39
2.	"Little Wonders"	Rob Thomas	3:45
3.	"The Future Has Arrived"	The All-American Rejects	3:05
4.	"Where Is Your Heart At?" (written by Rufus Wainwright)	Jamie Cullum	2:23
5.	"The Motion Waltz (Emotional Commotion)"	Rufus Wainwright	2:35
6.	"Give Me the Simple Life"	Jamie Cullum	2:04
7.	"The Prologue"		1:24
8.	"To the Future!"		1:16
9.	"Meeting the Robinsons"		1:56
10.	"The Science Fair"		2:47
11.	"Goob's Story"		1:01
12.	"A Family United"		1:37
13.	"Pop Quiz and the Time Machine Montage"		3:45
14.	"The Evil Plan"		4:13
15.	"Doris Has Her Day"		4:58
16.	"Setting Things Right"		6:00
17.	"There's a Great Big Beautiful Tomorrow"	They Might Be Giants	2:00
18.	"Kids of the Future"	Jonas Brothers	3:18
Total length:			52:46

== Release ==
=== Theatrical ===
Meet the Robinsons was originally scheduled to release on December 15, 2006, but due to new CEO John Lasseter requesting changes to the story and the villain, the film got delayed to March 30, 2007. Over 600 theaters with RealD 3D digital equipped theaters presented the Disney Digital 3-D version of the film. In all theatrical showings, the standard version of the film was accompanied by the 1938 Mickey Mouse short film Boat Builders, and the 3D version was accompanied by the 1953 Donald Duck 3D short film Working for Peanuts. The final credits of the 3D version were left two-dimensional, except for the names of those who converted the film to 3D.

=== Home media ===
Meet the Robinsons was released on DVD and Blu-ray Disc in North America on October 23, 2007 through Walt Disney Home Entertainment. Both versions feature a 1.78:1 widescreen aspect ratio and a Dolby Digital 5.1 surround sound audio, music videos, the "Family Function 5000" game, deleted scenes, and other bonus features. The DVD's audio commentary contains Anderson's narration, occasionally interrupted by himself as the Bowler Hat Guy. The Blu-ray also includes an uncompressed 5.1 audio and a BD-J game, Bowler Hat Barrage!. A Blu-ray 3D was released on November 8, 2011. As of January 2008, the DVD has had sold approximately 4 million copies.

== Reception ==
=== Critical reception ===
On the review aggregator website Rotten Tomatoes, 68% of 143 critics' reviews are positive, with an average rating of 6.4/10. The website's consensus reads: "Meet the Robinsons is a visually impressive children's animated film marked by a story of considerable depth." Metacritic reported the film had a weighted average score of 61 out of 100 based on 27 critic reviews, indicating "generally favorable" reviews. Audiences polled by CinemaScore gave the film an average grade of "A–" on an A+ to F scale.

Real Movie News stated it has "a snappy plot that demands close attention as it whizzes back and forth in the space-time continuum, touching on serious ideas and proposing some rather disturbing alternate realities. And the witty story twists are handled with rare subtlety and intelligence. In the end, it may get a little weepy and inspirational. But it's so charming that we don't mind at all". Danny Minton of the Beaumont Journal said that "The Robinsons might not be a family you want to hang out with, but they sure were fun to meet in this imaginative and beautiful 3-D experience". In a four out of six review, Stephen Garrett of Time Out said, What might have been a bland Back to the Future rip-off suddenly hums with a screwball sensibility chockablock with singing gangster frogs and evil bowler hats. Andrew L. Urban of Australian Urban Cinefile said, "Walt Disney stood for fantasy on screen and this is a loving tribute to his legacy". Kyle Smith of the New York Post named it the 10th best film of 2007.

Conversely, A. O. Scott of The New York Times wrote: "Meet the Robinsons is surely one of the worst theatrically released animated features issued under the Disney label in quite some time". At the same time, Lisa Schwarzbaum of Entertainment Weekly gave the film a "C" and said, "This is one bumpy ride". Sandie Angulo Chen of Common Sense Media gave the film a rating of three stars out of five, saying "The multi-generational relationships, especially in the future, are endearing." She also said that the main characters, Lewis and Wilbur, are "perfect protagonists in children's adventures," she called them "ultimate underdogs, and only the most hardened heart could root against them." She noted that Lewis describing as "not the typical orphan suffering under the rule of cruel-hearted adults."

=== Box office ===
Meet the Robinsons grossed $97.8 million in North America and $72.7 million in other territories, for a worldwide total of $170.5 million. In North America, the film debuted with $7.6 million on its opening day before earning $25.1 million over its opening weekend, finishing in second place behind Paramount’s Blades of Glory. In its second weekend, the film dropped 33% to $16.7 million, remaining in second place behind Blades of Glory and ahead of Sony’s newcomer Are We Done Yet?.

=== Accolades ===
Award	Date of ceremony	Category	Recipients	Result
Annie Awards	February 8, 2008	Storyboarding in a Feature Production	Don Hall	Nominated
Annie Awards	February 8, 2008	Music in a Feature Production	Danny Elfman, Rufus Wainwright, and Rob Thomas	Nominated
Young Artist Award	March 30, 2008	Best Family Feature Film - Animation	Meet the Robinsons	Nominated
Young Artist Award	March 30, 2008	Best Performance in a Voice-Over Role – Young Actor	Paul Butcher	Won
Young Artist Award	March 30, 2008	Best Performance in a Voice-Over Role – Young Actor	Jordan Fry	Nominated
Golden Reel Award	2008	Golden Reel Award for Outstanding Achievement in Sound Editing – Sound Effects, Foley, Dialogue and ADR for Animated Feature Film	Todd Toon (supervising sound editor/sound designer); David Kern (supervising Foley editor); G.W. Brown (supervising dialogue/ADR editor); Adam Kopald, Donald J. Malouf, Chuck Michael (sound effects editors); Charles W. Ritter (dialogue editor); Earl Ghaffari, Bill Abbott (music editors); Dan O'Connell, John T. Cucci (Foley artists)	Nominated
Saturn Awards	June 24, 2008	Best Animated Film	Meet the Robinsons	Nominated
Chicago Film Critics Association	December 13, 2007	Best Animated Film	Steve Anderson	Nominated

== Video games ==
A Meet the Robinsons video game was published by Disney Interactive Studios for PlayStation 2, Xbox 360, Wii, GameCube, Nintendo DS, and Microsoft Windows. England-based Climax Group developed their own adaptation for the Game Boy Advance.

Bowler Hat Guy, Franny Robinson, and Carl (referred to in-game as Carl the Robot) appear as playable characters in the mobile game Disney Heroes: Battle Mode.

== Cancelled sequel ==
Disneytoon Studios originally planned to make a direct-to-video sequel to the film, tentatively titled Meet the Robinsons 2: First Date. However, when Lasseter became Walt Disney Animation Studios' new chief creative officer, he cancelled all sequels in development at Disneytoon, including Meet the Robinsons 2, and ordered the studio to shift its focus towards spin-off films and original productions.

== Legacy ==
In May 2022, many cast and crew members, including Stephen Anderson and Michaela Jill Murphy, reunited to celebrate the film's 15-year anniversary by participating in a two-hour livestream on YouTube. A limited edition MagicBand bracelet was also released by the company to commemorate the 15th anniversary.

The characters of Lewis, Wilbur, Bowler Hat Guy, Carl, and Lucille made cameos appearances in the 2023 short film Once Upon a Studio to celebrate Disney's 100th anniversary, in which they were recreated using new CGI models, which the same was done for the characters from Chicken Little and Bolt. This was due to the original models not being used for over a decade, as well as updates made to animation technology since the original film's release, with rigging and rendering being reworked so they could be used with modern technology.

In February 2026, a concept album based on the movie was released titled Meet The Robinsons: The Unofficial Cast Album, featuring various artists such as Kevin Chamberlin, Caroline Bowman, Leslie Carrara-Rudolph, and Caesar Samayoa, among others.
