= Giada in Paradise =

- Created by: Giada De Laurentiis
- Starring: Giada De Laurentiis
- Country of origin: United States
- No. of episodes: 6

Production
- Running time: 60 minutes

Original release
- Network: Food Network

Giada in Paradise is a show that debuted on the Food Network on June 16, 2007. The series features host Giada De Laurentiis exploring food and culture at her favorite vacation destinations. In 2012, the series switched to the Cooking Channel, where, as of May 25, 2013, four more episodes have aired. In 2014, the series won a Daytime Creative Arts Emmy Award for Outstanding Special Class Directing (Anne Fox), Single Camera Photography, and Single Camera Editing.

== Episodes ==
- June 16, 2007: Santorini – Giada explores the food, culture and scenery of the Greek island of Santorini from its idyllic beaches and cliffside villages.
- June 23, 2007: Capri – Giada visits Capri, Italy, one of her family's favorite vacation spots, and offers tips for touring the island.
- January 15, 2012: Bora Bora – An exploration of the French Polynesian island of Bora Bora in the South Pacific
- January 20, 2013: Monaco – Giada takes in the sights and foods of Monte Carlo while traveling through Monaco.
- April 21, 2013: Thailand – Giada samples the many foods of Thailand.
- May 25, 2013: Monte Carlo – Giada explores the cuisine of Monte Carlo, as well as other attractions.
