= Lost Ollie =

Television series from Netflix

- Netflix poster
- Genre: Adventure; Fantasy; Drama
- Created by: Shannon Tindle
- Based on: Ollie's Odyssey by William Joyce
- Directed by: Peter Ramsey
- Starring: Jake Johnson; Gina Rodriguez
- Voices of: Jonathan Groff; Tim Blake Nelson; Mary J. Blige
- Narrated by: Jonathan Groff
- Composers: Scot Stafford; Stephen Spies; Justine von Winterfeldt
- Country of origin: United States
- Original language: English
- No. of episodes: 4

Production
- Executive producers: Shannon Tindle; Peter Ramsey; Shawn Levy; Josh Barry; Emily Morris; Brandon Oldenburg; Lampton Enochs
- Cinematography: C. Kim Miles
- Running time: 41–51 minutes
- Production companies: Fufufufu Productions; 21 Laps Entertainment; Industrial Light & Magic

Original release
- Network: Netflix
- Release: August 24, 2022

Lost Ollie is an American live action/animated adventure fantasy drama television miniseries created by Shannon Tindle. The series is based on the 2016 children's book Ollie's Odyssey by William Joyce. It tells the story of a lost toy searching across the countryside for his owner and blends live-action performances with computer-generated animation.

Lost Ollie was released on August 24, 2022, by Netflix.

== Synopsis ==
A lost rabbit toy, Ollie, finds himself at a lost and found section of an antique shop. He remembers that he was separated from his best friend, Billy. Having only a few recollections of his past, Ollie decides to take a journey to find Billy. Meanwhile, he slowly rediscovers his own fond memories with Billy and his family alongside their misfortunes and sorrows.

== Cast ==
=== Voice cast ===
- Jonathan Groff as Ollie : The voice of the loyal and determined stuffed bunny who is on a mission to reunite with his owner.
- Tim Blake Nelson as Zozo : A clown toy who becomes one of Ollie's unexpected companions.
- Mary J. Blige as Rosy : A tough but compassionate toy bear who helps Ollie on his journey.

=== Live-action cast ===
- Jake Johnson as Daddy : Billy's father, whose character provides insight into Billy's emotional state.
- Gina Rodriguez as Momma : Billy's mother, whose story arc is significant in understanding the family's dynamics.
- Kesler Talbot as Billy
  - William Carson as young Billy
  - James Pizzinato as Suzy's dad/Older Billy
- BJ Harrison as Flossie
- Everett Andres as Mike Apple
- Zoë Noelle Baker as Jolene
- Isabel Birch as Suzy

== Episodes ==
| No. | Title | Directed by | Written by | Original release date |
|---|---|---|---|---|
| 1 | "Ollie Is Lost" | Peter Ramsey | Teleplay by : Shannon Tindle | August 24, 2022 |
A sentient stuffed rabbit named Ollie, who gets separated from his human owner, Billy, finds himself stuck in a thrift shop, where he tries to escape, but gets attacked by a dog named Buttons before being rescued by a clown toy named Zozo. When Zozo asks how Ollie got to the thrift shop, Ollie, who had fuzzy memories, says that he didn't know which direction is his home. As he remembers his time with Billy and his "Momma", Ollie draws pictures of the directions to his home, and seeks help from Zozo, who reveals he had a lost friend of his, a dancing doll named Nina, and he spent years trying to search for her. Zozo and Ollie manage to escape, but are nearly attacked again by Buttons, before he is driven away by a stuffed bear named Rosy, whom Zozo had met before. Ollie, Zozo, and Rosy arrive near the ship in the Ohio River and start a quest to look for Billy, who sets out looking for Ollie as well.
| 2 | "The Quest" | Peter Ramsey | Joanna Calo | August 24, 2022 |
While on a quest to find Billy, Ollie, Zozo, and Rosy arrive at the city, where they enter a hospital. There, Ollie remembers an MRI scanner Billy's Momma goes into, after singing All I Have to Do is Dream to Billy when he gets scared. Meanwhile, while searching for Ollie, Billy meets his father's friends at the pub, Zeke's Five. Ollie, Zozo, and Rosy go for the ride on the train, jump off from it, and then go to the forest, where they climb up the wooden Troll statue and look at the view of an amusement park called Dreamland, which Zozo points towards despite Ollie's suggestion to go to school he remembered going to with Billy. There, Ollie remembers the discussion about Billy's Momma condition. Worried that she will die from cancer, Ollie decides to return home, but when Zozo claims Dreamland is exactly where he needs him to go to, Ollie realize that Zozo lied to him about bringing him back home. Zozo reveals his suspicions about Ollie's connection to Nina after hearing the bell ring inside of him and the song Ollie sang, which reminds him of his past. Zozo holds Ollie hostage, as Rosy says she's been trying to leave Ollie behind to protect him. Back at the forest, Billy notices the Troll statue and the view of Dreamland, remembering Momma telling him about this place that has "no fear nor pain. Just love."
| 3 | "Bali Hai" | Peter Ramsey | Marc Haimes | August 24, 2022 |
In 1965, Zozo, who is revealed to be a spring doll in his own ball-shooting stall game in Dreamland, meets Nina, a Balinese Doll, in her own stall, Bali Hai, and the two form a romantic bond. However, during the auction in 1970, Nina gets sold to a young girl who brings her home, leaving Zozo devastated. Years passed as Zozo's stall collapses, setting Zozo free: after sewing legs of his own, he is able to stand up and sets out to find Nina. During his quest, Zozo discovers Rosy, a torn-apart stuffed bear, whom he repairs and befriends. Together, they began searching for Nina, but Zozo's emotional sorrow for Nina's departure has driven him mad, to the point of murdering a stuffed rhinoceros for misleading him to Nina, which horrifies Rosy. Ashamed of what he has done, Zozo leaves a note for Rosy and goes to the thrift shop, where he stayed for years. Rosy walks up to the door to the shop in search of Zozo, but as she reads Zozo's note telling her not to follow him and thanking her for everything, she relents and walks away sadly. Zozo, who still remains in the thrift shop, hears the bell reminding him of Nina, reminiscent of how he and Ollie first met. In the present day, Zozo has Ollie tied up and tortures him for answers about Nina, though Ollie still doesn't remember anything about her. Before Zozo can tear him apart, Rosy gives him some time in an attempt of freeing Ollie. Rosy unsuccessfully attempts to distract Zozo when he notices Ollie escaping on the Swan boat. Zozo, enraged, hastily throws Rosy against the Bali Hai sign and starts chasing Ollie. The Swan boat falls off the path, with Zozo managing to get on the boat and trying to slaughter Ollie before Rosy intervenes. As the two fight, Zozo stabs Rosy in the chest, wishing he had never brought her back to life in the first place, and throws her off the Swan boat, with Ollie being thrown off the boat into the water.
| 4 | "Home" | Peter Ramsey | Shannon Tindle & Kate Gersten | August 24, 2022 |
Ollie comes out of the water and arrives at school, where he remembers what led to his separation from Billy: on the day Billy brought him to school for Show and Tell, a bully threw him outside of school. Though Billy intended to pick up Ollie, a reminder of his father telling him to grow up made him leave Ollie. Though initially heartbroken by this discovery, Ollie remembers Momma's wish to help the family before she died from cancer. Ollie decides to continue his journey and manages to return to Billy's home, only to find the house empty and abandoned. Entering the house, Ollie sees a photo of a young girl holding Nina on Billy's memory wall, causing him to remember that when Momma, revealed to be the girl who picked up Nina from Dreamland, made him, she placed a bell that belonged to her in his chest as a heart after Nina fell apart a long time ago. Having followed Ollie the way home, a damaged Zozo furiously chases him out of the house and beats him, believing that he did something to Nina, to which Ollie confesses to him that Nina fell apart. Though Ollie assures him that it's okay to feel hurt when you lose someone, Zozo, after seemingly taking in Ollie's words and crying, spitefully rips the bell out of Ollie's chest, killing him, before being stabbed to death by a dying Rosy, who assures to Ollie that he already made it back home. While Zozo and Rosy's lifeless bodies are washed away by the water, Ollie's life starts flashing before his eyes. In the morning, a man approaches Ollie's lifeless body, picks him up, and takes him to his house, where he sews his heart back in his chest. The man is revealed to be an adult Billy, who has a daughter named Suzy, whom Ollie met at the thrift shop. Suzy tells Billy that Ollie has a message from his Momma, saying that "you can be sad, but don't grow bitter. You can be mad, but not with each other. And just because you lose someone, doesn't mean they're gone." Billy reconciles with Ollie and spends some quality time with him and Suzy.

== Production ==
Lost Ollie was created by Shannon Tindle, known for his work on Coraline and Kubo and the Two Strings. The series was produced by 21 Laps Entertainment, the same production company behind Stranger Things. It was directed by Peter Ramsey, who directed Rise of the Guardians, another adaptation of a William Joyce book, and also co-directed Spider-Man: Into the Spider-Verse. The series uses a mix of live-action and CGI to bring the toy characters to life, with visual effects crafted by Industrial Light & Magic (ILM) with a blending of the animated and real-world elements.

=== Development ===
On October 6, 2020, Netflix director Teddy Biaselli revealed that Lost Ollie had been picked up by the streaming platform, mentioning that the series had been in the works since 2016.

=== Casting ===
On March 9, 2021, Jonathan Groff was cast in the title role, with Mary J. Blige, Tim Blake Nelson, Gina Rodriguez, Jake Johnson, and Kesler Talbot also joining the series and production beginning in Vancouver.

=== Filming ===
Principal photography for the series began on February 1, 2021, with filming taking place inside and outside College Park Elementary from February 9 to February 11 in Port Moody. According to Production Weekly, filming concluded in March 2021. Scenes were also shot in and around Tindle’s hometown of Shepherdsville, Kentucky.

=== Soundtrack ===
On the soundtrack, the Norwegian band, Hayde Bluegrass Orchestra, performed the cover of the Everly Brothers' version of All I Have to Do is Dream. The song was written by Boudleaux Bryant, arranged and co-produced by Scot Stafford.

== Release ==
Lost Ollie premiered on Netflix on August 24, 2022, as a four-part limited series. It became a notable entry in Netflix's growing library of family-oriented programming.

== Reception ==
The series overall was received positively. On the review aggregator website Rotten Tomatoes, 93% of 15 critics' reviews are positive, with an average rating of 8.1/10. The website's consensus reads: "Well-crafted and painfully poignant, the wistful Lost Ollie is rewarding family entertainment."

Rendy Jones of RogerEbert.com gave the series 3.5/4 stars praising its visuals, writing, and characterization. He emphasized the "breathtaking" visuals on the series as well as the dark and sentimental approach to the formula. Stephanie Snyder of Common Sense Media gave the series 4/5 stars praising its cinematography and storytelling while criticizing its "inauthentic" Southern accent of the characters. Joel Keller of Decider similarly praised its visuals provided by the effects team of ILM while criticizing the characters' "unnatural" accent.

== Awards ==
| Award | Date of Ceremony | Category | Recipient(s) | Result | Ref. |
|---|---|---|---|---|---|
| ASC Awards | March 5, 2023 | Pilot, Limited Series, or Motion Picture Made for Television | C. Kim Miles (for "Bali Hai") | Nominated | |
| Children's and Family Emmy Awards | December 16–17, 2023 | Outstanding Lead Performance in a Preschool, Children's or Young Teen Program | Gina Rodriguez | Nominated | |
| Children's and Family Emmy Awards | December 16–17, 2023 | Outstanding Writing for a Live Action Preschool or Children's Program | Shannon Tindle, Joanna Calo, Marc Haimes and Kate Gersten | Nominated | |
| Children's and Family Emmy Awards | December 16–17, 2023 | Outstanding Directing for a Single Camera Program | Peter Ramsey | Won | |
| Children's and Family Emmy Awards | December 16–17, 2023 | Outstanding Art Direction/Set Decoration/Scenic Design | Lost Ollie | Nominated | |
| Children's and Family Emmy Awards | December 16–17, 2023 | Outstanding Cinematography for a Live Action Single-Camera Program | C. Kim Miles | Nominated | |
| Children's and Family Emmy Awards | December 16–17, 2023 | Outstanding Lighting, Camera and Technical Arts | Blaine Ackerly, Brad Creasser, Junichi Hosoi and Ryan McGregor | Won | |
| Children's and Family Emmy Awards | December 16–17, 2023 | Outstanding Editing for a Single Camera Program | Ryan Chan and Debby Germino | Won | |
| Children's and Family Emmy Awards | December 16–17, 2023 | Outstanding Music Direction and Composition for a Live Action Program | Scot Stafford, Stephen Spies and Justine von Winterfeldt | Won | |
| Children's and Family Emmy Awards | December 16–17, 2023 | Outstanding Sound Mixing and Sound Editing for a Live Action Program | Jamey Scott, Rob Hanchar, Michael Williamson, Jonathan Stevens and Joshua Winget | Nominated | |
| Children's and Family Emmy Awards | December 16–17, 2023 | Outstanding Visual Effects for a Live Action Program | Lost Ollie | Won (Note: Tied with Jane) | |
