= The Man in the Moon (Joyce book) =

2011 picture book by William Joyce

The Man in the Moon is a 2011 picture book by William Joyce, published by Atheneum Books. It is the first part of the book series The Guardians of Childhood, which was adapted into the animated film Rise of the Guardians. It tells the origin story of the folkloric Man in the Moon, nicknamed MiM, and how he became a protective figure for Earth's children.

== Summary ==
Long ago during the last years of a cosmic Golden Age, the infant Man in the Moon (or MiM for short) and his family traveled the universe aboard the Moon Clipper, a moon-like ship with solar sails. However Pitch, the tyrannical Nightmare King, began wreaking havoc across the stars and sought out the young Moon prince upon hearing stories of a child that never had a nightmare. Looking for a place to hide, the Moon Clipper hid in orbit around a planet that didn't have its own moon: Earth. However, Pitch was able to catch up and in the battle that ensued, MiM's parents were lost and his bodyguard Nightlight was able to seal Pitch away on Earth.

Now an orphan, MiM was raised by the disabled moon ship's crew of Glowworms, Moonbots and Moon Mice. As he grew, he was able to discover that he was not alone as there were children just like him on Earth. Listening into their hopes and dreams by way of lost balloons that had come to rest on the Moon, MiM began seeking out like-minded figures on Earth to assist him in making children happy such as the Sandman, Santa Claus, the Tooth Fairy, the Easter Bunny and Mother Goose. To help children with their fear of the dark, he found a way to brighten up the surface of the moon after finding a glowing sand beneath the layers of moondust and with his crew, he formed the Moon into a giant smiling nightlight in the sky. Calling on his Earthly allies, he formed the Guardians of Childhood to protect the children from Pitch's lingering influence over their dreams, taking on the role Nightlight once held for him.

== Reception ==
Publishers Weekly stated that it has a "steampunk" style; the magazine gave the book a starred review, arguing that it is "warm and fuzzy, swashbuckling, and dazzlingly inventive".

Kirkus Reviews argued that the imagery is "a visual feast" but that the storyline is underdeveloped, "Feeling more like an introductory tale than a full-blooded story".
