= The Traveling Man =

Series of metal sculptures depicting robots and birds in Dallas

Walking Tall, one of the three sculptures of The Traveling Man in Deep Ellum, Dallas

The Traveling Man is a series of three metal sculptures depicting robots accompanied by birds in the Deep Ellum neighborhood of Dallas. Made of brushed and polished sheets of stainless steel held together with rivets, the sculptures were a collaboration between sculptor Brad Oldham and Brandon Oldenburg of Reel FX Creative Studios. They are intended to be evocative of both the history of rail transportation in Deep Ellum and its more recent development as an artistic community.

The sculptures were commissioned by Dallas Area Rapid Transit (DART) and unveiled in August 2009, replacing a series of murals that were destroyed in 2007 for the construction of DART rail in Deep Ellum. The three individual sculptures that comprise The Traveling Man progress chronologically. Awakening is a 4.5-foot (1.4 m) sculpture that depicts only part of The Traveling Man's head as it emerges from a gravel pit. Waiting on a Train features the robot playing a guitar. Walking Tall is 38 feet (12 m) in height and posed mid-stride. All three of the sculptures are surrounded by metal birds.

== Design ==
The Traveling Man is a series of three metal sculptures depicting robots accompanied by birds in the Deep Ellum neighborhood of Dallas. They were created by a collaboration between Brad Oldham and Brandon Oldenburg. Oldenburg and his Reel FX Creative Studios, an animation and production studio in Deep Ellum, developed the idea of a giant metal robot walking through the neighborhood. Oldham, a sculptor from Dallas, formed the physical sculptures. All three sculptures are made of brushed and polished sheets of stainless steel that are held together with approximately 10,000 stainless steel rivets. The Traveling Man's design is intended to require minimal maintenance and to invite the public to interact with the sculptures.

The Traveling Man is intended to be evocative of both the history of rail transportation in Deep Ellum and its more recent development as an artistic community. Writing in the Dallas Observer, Kimber Westphall counted them among the neighborhood's "most iconic and photographed fixtures". Oldenburg called The Traveling Man a "figure that represents the spirit of the artists".

== Construction ==
The Traveling Man sculptures were commissioned by Dallas Area Rapid Transit (DART) in July 2007. The budget for the project was set at $1.4 million. In August 2009, the finished sculptures were unveiled and gifted to the City of Dallas. They replaced a series of murals that were destroyed in 2007 for the construction of DART rail in Deep Ellum. The sculptures were installed along Good-Latimer Expressway.

== Individual sculptures ==
The three individual sculptures that comprise The Traveling Man tell a chronological story that begins with Awakening, a 4.5-foot (1.4 m) sculpture that depicts only part of The Traveling Man's head as it emerges from a gravel pit as three metal birds look on. Awakening illustrates the fictional origin story of The Traveling Man, which according to Oldham and Oldenburg is that it was a steam locomotive buried beneath an elm tree that sprang to life when a blues musician spilled gin on the tree's roots. Oldham further elaborated that the birds "represent the artistic souls who have been and will be in Deep Ellum".

The second of the sculptures, Waiting on a Train, features the robot playing a guitar. This sculpture is sitting and leaning against a piece of concrete debris that was recovered from an old railroad tunnel in Deep Ellum. Like the others, it is surrounded by metal birds.

The third of the three sculptures, Walking Tall, is 38 feet (12 m) in height, weighs 35,000 pounds (16,000 kg), and is located next to DART rail's Deep Ellum station. This sculpture is posed mid-stride and features a metal bird on its arm and more around its feet.
