= Dinosaur Bob and His Adventures with the Family Lazardo =

1988 children's picture book by William Joyce

Dinosaur Bob and His Adventures with the Family Lazardo is a 1988 children's picture book by William Joyce.

The story involves an American family, the Lazardos, bringing a Giraffatitan dinosaur from Africa into the United States, and the complications involved. The dinosaur faces arrest after he followed cars, but finds that he is very good at baseball.

Publishers Weekly described Bob as "gargantuan yet unthreatening". Cathryn A. Camper of the Minneapolis Public Library, in School Library Journal, described Bob as "friendly". Camper stated that the style comes from a mishmash of several historical film periods.

Publishers Weekly wrote that the book has a "matter-of-fact" prose and that it is "campy"; the magazine added that the illustrations have "unorthodox aerial" angles and "Surprising juxtapositions". The book has a dedication to King Kong, though Stefan Kanfer of Time stated that the dinosaur is humorous instead of being "tragic", and that the ending is favorable to the dinosaur.

Camper described the artwork as "dreamy" with "Deep, rich colors", and the text as "droll". Camper compared the book to Clifford the Big Red Dog and The Mysterious Dinosaur. Camper had a positive reception of the book.

In 2017 the imprint Atheneum was to reissue Dinosaur Bob.
