= Man on the Moon =

Man on the Moon may refer to:

== Books ==
- Man on the Moon (book), a 2002 children's book by Simon Bartram
- A Man on the Moon, a 1994 nonfiction book by Andrew Chaikin

== Film and TV ==
- Man on the Moon (film), a 1999 biopic of Andy Kaufman starring Jim Carrey
- "The Man on the Moon", the 2015 John Lewis Christmas advert

== Music ==
=== Albums ===
- Man on the Moon soundtrack
- Man on the Moon, an album trilogy by American musician Kid Cudi:
  - Man on the Moon: The End of Day, 2009 (also acting as his debut studio album)
  - Man on the Moon II: The Legend of Mr. Rager, 2010
  - Man on the Moon III: The Chosen, 2020
- Man on the Moon (N.Flying album), 2021
- Man on the Moon (Fitz and the Tantrums album), 2025

=== Shows ===
- Man on the Moon (opera), a 2006 television opera by Jonathan Dove
- Man on the Moon (musical), a 1975 Broadway musical written by John Phillips of the Mamas and the Papas

=== Songs ===
- "Man on the Moon" (R.E.M. song), 1992
- "Man on the Moon / Hunnie Pie", a 2016 double single by Zella Day
- "Man on the Moon" (Alan Walker song), 2021
- "Man on the Moon", a 1980 song by Ballyhoo
- "Man on the Moon (The Anthem)", a 2008 song by Kid Cudi from A Kid Named Cudi
- "Man on the Moon", a 2012 song by Phillip Phillips from The World from the Side of the Moon
- "Man on the Moon", a 2016 song by Britney Spears from Glory
- "The Man on the Moon", a spoken track by The Wiggles from their 1991 self-titled album

== See also ==
- Moon landing
- Apollo 11 in 1969, the first crewed Moon landing
- "Man and the Moon", Wernher von Braun TV special
- Man in the Moon (disambiguation)
- Moon Man (disambiguation)
