= America Now =

- Genre: Newsmagazine
- Presented by: Leeza Gibbons; Bill Rancic
- Country of origin: United States
- Original language: English
- No. of seasons: 4

Production
- Running time: 30 minutes
- Production companies: Raycom Media; Longneedle Entertainment (2010-11); 1525 Productions (2011-12); Bellum Entertainment (2012-14); ITV Studios America

Original release
- Network: First-run syndication
- Release: October 30, 2010 – September 5, 2014

America Now is a defunct American daily television magazine program hosted by Leeza Gibbons and Bill Rancic, featuring "news you can really use" on lifestyle topics such as health, diet, family and pets. The program, which aired Monday through Friday, was produced by ITV Studios America. America Now was broadcast across the United States on stations owned by Raycom Media, along with being syndicated nationwide in its last season.

== Production ==
The show utilized material from television stations owned by Raycom Media, and original demonstrations from experts on various topics. The show first aired on October 30, 2010. During the first season, the program was one hour in length and only aired weekends on Raycom Media stations.

On September 12, 2011, the second season premiered, with Gibbons joining Rancic as the show began airing Monday through Friday in two 30-minute episodes generally run back to back.

On March 9, 2012, ITV Studios and Raycom Media announced that America Now had been renewed through the 2012-13 season.

On February 18, 2014, Raycom Media announced that the fourth season of America Now would be its last, with the last episode airing on September 5.
