= Brandon Oldenburg =

American filmmaker

- Occupations: Filmmaker; illustrator

Brandon Oldenburg is an American filmmaker and illustrator.

== Career ==
He was an early employee of Reel FX Creative Studios (1995), doing a combination of design and special effects for television and film. Serving as Senior Creative director for 15 years, he worked with such clients as Troublemaker Studios, Pixar, Disney, DreamWorks and Blue Sky Studios. From 1998 to 2009, Oldenburg oversaw a joint venture with William Joyce and Reel FX. Oldenburg and Joyce's other collaborations include Halloween decor for Martha Stewart, Parade Floats for Disney and Title Design for feature films. Their most recent story was 2012's Rise of the Guardians.

In 2009, Oldenburg and Joyce founded Moonbot Studios in Shreveport, Louisiana. Their initial goal was to create an Academy Award-nominated animated short film as a calling card of the quality of the studio's work. In 2012, The Fantastic Flying Books of Mr. Morris Lessmore won an Oscar.

In 2017, Oldenburg and the creative leadership from Moonbot merged with the VR team from Reel FX to form a new company called Flight School.

== Recognition ==
Oldenburg's work has won the Distinguished Alumni of the Year from Ringling College of Art and Design, where he received his BFA in Illustration and sits on the Board of Trustees. Oldenburg and designer Brad Oldham collaborated on a giant sculptural series for a $1.4 million commission called The Traveling Man. Brandon's illustrations have been used as covers for books by Elmore Leonard and Michael Chabon.
