= William Joyce (writer) =

American writer (born 1959)

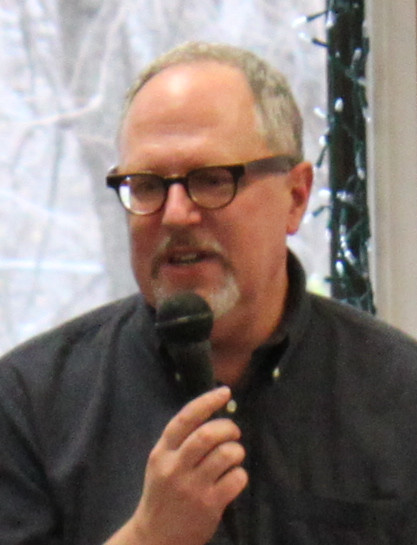
- Joyce promoting The Man in the Moon in November 2011
- Born: William Edward Joyce; December 11, 1957 (age 68); Shreveport, Louisiana, U.S.
- Education: Southern Methodist University
- Occupations: Author; illustrator; filmmaker
- Spouses: Elizabeth Joyce (died 2016); Hilary (m. 2020)
- Children: 2
- Writing career
- Years active: 1981–present
- Website: williamjoyce.com

William Edward Joyce (born December 11, 1957) is an American writer, illustrator, and filmmaker. He has achieved worldwide recognition as an author, artist and pioneer in the digital and animation industry.

He has written and illustrated over 50 children's books and novels which have been translated into over 40 languages.

Joyce began his film career as a concept artist for Toy Story (1995), and has since been active in both animation and live-action. He subsequently landed credits on films including A Bug's Life (1998) and Robots (2005). His book A Day with Wilbur Robinson was adapted into the Disney film Meet the Robinsons (2007), with which he had direct involvement.

Among his many awards, Joyce has won six Emmys, three Annies, and an Academy award, the last being for his short film The Fantastic Flying Books of Mr. Morris Lessmore (2011).

Joyce was named by Newsweek magazine as "one of the 100 people to watch in the new millennium". His feature films, all based on his books, include Epic, Rise of the Guardians, Robots, and Meet the Robinsons. His television series include the animated Rolie Polie Olie, for which he was creator and showrunner.

He has also painted numerous covers for the New Yorker Magazine. His company, Howdybot Studios, is focused on Joyce's stories in a variety of mediums and media. Joyce's short film Mr. Spam Gets a New Hat (2022) has won awards at a number of film festivals in the U.S. He is also in pre-production on an animated version of The Great Gatsby. Both projects are in collaboration with DNEG Animation.

In 2022, Joyce's novel Ollie's Odyssey was adapted into a Netflix series titled Lost Ollie.

== Career ==
=== Children's literature ===
Joyce has written and illustrated over 50 children's books including George Shrinks, Santa Calls, Dinosaur Bob and His Adventures with the Family Lazardo, Rolie Polie Olie, The Leaf Men and the Brave Good Bugs, A Day with Wilbur Robinson, The Fantastic Flying Books of Mr. Morris Lessmore, The Guardians of Childhood series, and many others.

Joyce's first book Tammy and the Gigantic Fish by James and Katherine Gray was published by Harper & Row (now HarperCollins) in 1983. After the retirement of his longtime editor Laura Gerringer in 2011, Joyce moved his backlist and all subsequent books to Simon & Schuster, where his editor is Caitlyn Dlouhy.

Since being at Simon & Schuster, Joyce has produced a number of bestselling titles, including The Fantastic Flying Books of Mr. Morris Lessmore which debuted at number 1 on the New York Times bestseller list in July 2012, a position it held for several weeks. Morris Lessmore has been translated into over 40 languages and was named by Time magazine as one of the 100 best children's books of all time. Morris Lessmore is the most expansive and experimental of Joyce's stories. With his company Moonbot Studios, Joyce along with his partners, produced the Lessmore story in a variety of media and mediums simultaneously. A short film was in production (using handmade miniature sets) while the book was being illustrated (along with Joe Bluhm) and an interactive story app was being devised.

The story app of Morris Lessmore received overwhelmingly positive attention and in August 2011 briefly dislodged Angry Birds as the bestselling app in the world. It was voted into the app hall of fame soon after.

=== Film and television ===
The Canadian children's series Rolie Polie Olie and George Shrinks are both based on Joyce's books. He has received three additional Emmys for other animated projects.

Joyce created conceptual characters for the Disney/Pixar feature films Toy Story (1995) and A Bug's Life (1998). In 2001, Pixar founder John Lasseter introduced Joyce to animation director Chris Wedge. At this time, Wedge's fledging animation studio Blue Sky Studios was completing the short film Bunny and intended to begin developing feature animated films, which they soon did with the Ice Age franchise.

In 2002, Joyce and Wedge conceptualized the film Robots while attempting to adapt Joyce's book Santa Calls into a feature film. In the final film, Joyce is credited as a producer and production designer.

In 2005, Joyce and Reel FX launched a joint venture, Aimesworth Amusements, to produce feature films, video games, and books. The new company announced plans to make three feature films: The Guardians of Childhood, The Mischevians, and Dinosaur Bob and His Adventures with the Family Lazardo. The first of those projects, The Guardians of Childhood was developed by DreamWorks Animation into the feature film Rise of the Guardians. It was released in 2012 and is based on Joyce's book series and the short film Man in the Moon, which he directed. Joyce was originally slated to direct the film, but dropped out early in production after his daughter Mary Katherine, his wife Elizabeth, and his sister Cecile were diagnosed with terminal illnesses. He continued on as an executive producer along with his friend Guillermo del Toro. At the beginning of the end credits, DreamWorks dedicated the film to Mary, who died before the film's release.

In 2007, Disney released Meet the Robinsons, a feature film based on Joyce's book A Day with Wilbur Robinson. Joyce served as co-executive producer and production designer, and wrote several drafts of the screenplay.

In August 2009, Joyce and Reel FX co-founder Brandon Oldenburg and producers Lampton Enoch and Alyssa Kantrow founded a Shreveport-based animation and visual effects studio MOONBOT Studios. The studio produced an Oscar-winning animated short film and an iPad app The Fantastic Flying Books of Mr. Morris Lessmore. The short film went on to win an Academy award. A book adaption was released in summer 2012. The studio released in January 2012 another app, The Numberlys. A short film and a bestselling book followed soon after. The Numberlys film was short listed for the 2012 Academy Awards animated short film Oscar.

In 2013, Blue Sky Studios adapted Joyce's book The Leaf Men and the Brave Good Bugs into the film Epic, with him serving as writer, executive producer, and production designer.

In 2022, Joyce wrote and directed the short film Mr. Spam Gets a New Hat with DNEG Animation. The studio also announced that it would be producing an animated feature film adaptation of The Great Gatsby, directed by Joyce and written by Brian Selznick.

Also in 2022, Joyce's novel Ollie's Odyssey was adapted into an animated series of the same name.

== Awards and accolades ==
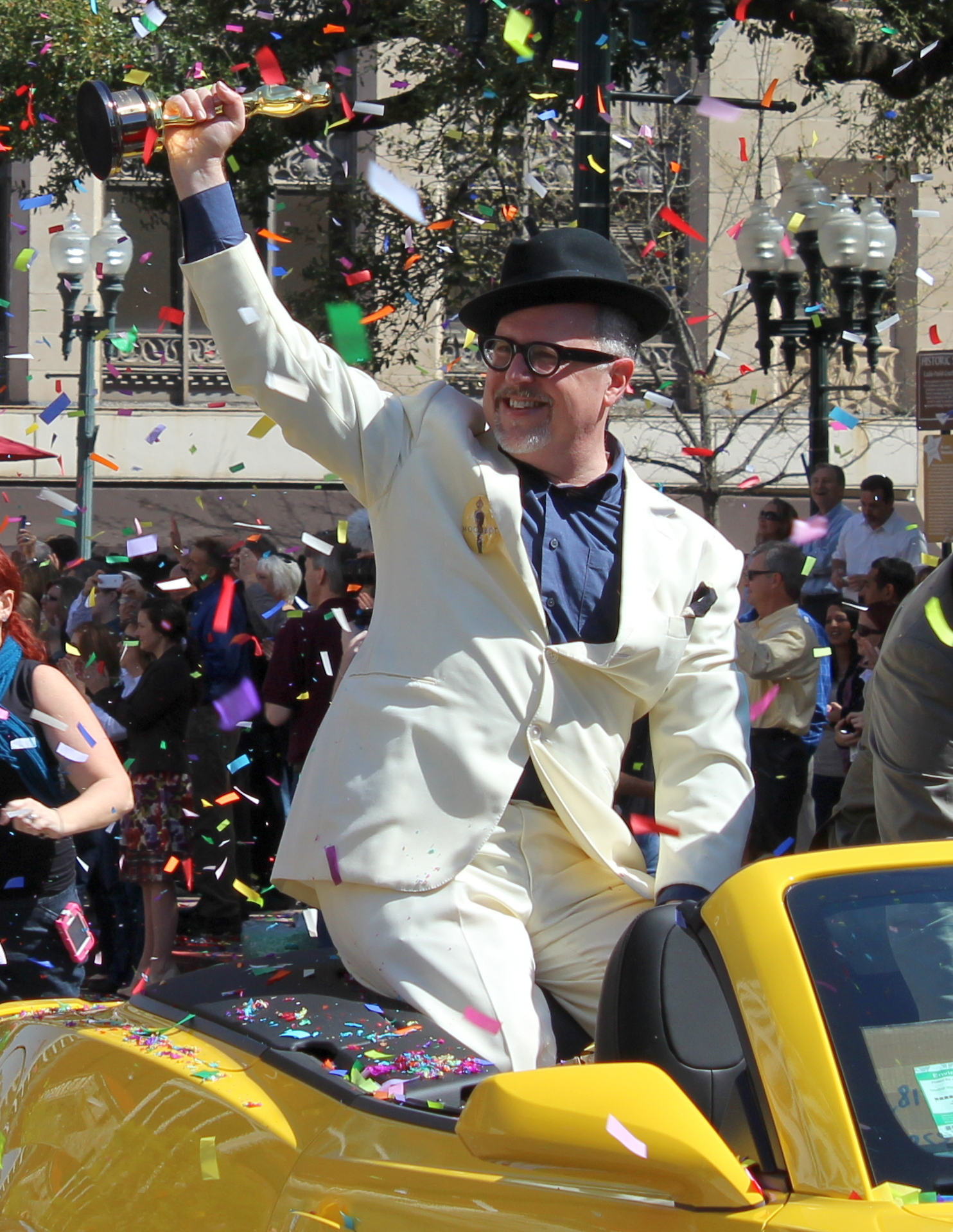
Joyce in March 2012 holding an Oscar for his short film The Fantastic Flying Books of Mr. Morris Lessmore during a parade in his and Brandon Oldenburg's honor held in downtown Shreveport.

Joyce received the 2008 Louisiana Writer Award for his enduring contribution to the "literary intellectual heritage of Louisiana." The award was presented to him on October 4, 2008, during a ceremony at the 2008 Louisiana Book Festival in Baton Rouge. On February 26, 2012, he won an Academy Award for Best Animated Short Film, The Fantastic Flying Books of Mr. Morris Lessmore.

Newsweek called him one of the top 100 people to watch in the new millennium.

Gold medal from the Society of Illustrators for Santa Calls.

Three silver medals from the Society of Illustrators.

=== Academy Awards ===
Year	Nominated work	Category	Result
2012	The Fantastic Flying Books of Mr. Morris Lessmore	Best Animated Short Film	Won

Emmy Awards

Year	Nominated work	Category	Result
1998-1999	Rolie Polie Olie "Little Sister, Big Brother"	Outstanding Individual Achievement in Animation	Won
1999-2000	Rolie Polie Olie	Outstanding Special Class Animated Program	Won
2004-2005	Rolie Polie Olie	Outstanding Special Class Animated Program	Won
2013-2014	The Scarecrow	Outstanding New Approaches - Original Daytime Program	Won
2014-2015	Silent	Outstanding Special Class Animated Program	Won
2016-2017	Taking Flight	Outstanding Special Class Animated Program	Won

== Personal life ==
William Joyce lives with his son Jackson Edward Joyce in Shreveport, Louisiana. His daughter, Mary Katherine, died on May 2, 2010, at the age of 18, due to complications from brain cancer. Rise of the Guardians, a film inspired by The Guardians of Childhood book series and in turn by stories that he told her as a child, was dedicated to her memory, reading "For Mary Katherine Joyce, a Guardian Fierce and True" during the credits. The main character of Epic, which is based on Joyce's book The Leaf Men and the Brave Good Bugs, was named after her. His wife, attorney Frances Elizabeth Baucum Joyce, died on January 20, 2016, at the age of 55, due to complications of ALS. He remarried on July 31, 2020.

In 2006, Joyce founded the Katrinarita Gras Foundation to raise money for victims of Hurricane Katrina and Hurricane Rita. He sold prints of his unpublished Mardi Gras The New Yorker cover, with profits going to Louisiana artists and arts organizations.

== Works by William Joyce ==
=== Books ===
In May 2017, Atheneum Young Readers released the picture book Bently & Egg, A Day with Wilbur Robinson, the film version of which is entitled Meet the Robinsons, and Dinosaur Bob and His Adventures with the Family Lazardo. All are under the label The World of William Joyce.

Note: All books are written and illustrated by Joyce, except as noted

- My First Book of Nursery Tales, retold by Marianna Mayer and illustrated by William Joyce (1983)
- Tammy and the Gigantic Fish by Catherine & James Gray, illustrated by William Joyce (1983)
- Waiting-for-Spring Stories by Bethany Roberts, illustrated by William Joyce (1984)
- William Joyce's Mother Goose, illustrated by William Joyce (1984)
- George Shrinks (1985)
- Shoes, written by Elizabeth Winthrop (1986)
- Dinosaur Bob and His Adventures with the Family Lazardo (1988)
- Humphrey's Bear by Jan Wahl, illustrated by William Joyce (1989)
- Some of the Adventures of Rhode Island Red by Stephen Manes, illustrated by William Joyce (1990)
- A Day with Wilbur Robinson (1990)
- Nicholas Cricket by Joyce Maxner, illustrated by William Joyce (1991)
- Bently & Egg (1992)
- Santa Calls (1993)
- Don't Wake the Princess: Hopes, Dreams, and Wishes, Cover art (1993)
- A Wiggly, Jiggly, Joggly Tooth by Bill Hawley, illustrated by William Joyce (1995)
- The Leaf Men and the Brave Good Bugs (1996), Play (premiere at Strand Theatre, Shreveport) - 1998
- Buddy (1997)
- World of William Joyce Scrapbook by William Joyce, photos by Philip Gould and design by Christine Kettner (1997)
- Life with Bob (board book) (1998)
- Baseball Bob (board book) (1999)
- The Art of Robots (2004)
- The Art of Rise of the Guardians (2012)
- The Fantastic Flying Books of Mr. Morris Lessmore (2012)
- The Mischievians (2013)
- The Numberlys, co-illustrated with Christina Ellis (2014)
- A Bean, a Stalk and a Boy Named Jack (2014)
- Billy's Booger (2015)
- Ollie's Odyssey (2016)
- Bently & Egg (2017)
- Rocket Puppies (2024)

==== Rolie Polie Olie series ====
1. Rolie Polie Olie (1999)
2. Rolie Polie Olie: How Many Howdys? (board book) (1999)
3. Rolie Polie Olie: A Little Spot of Color (board book) (2000)
4. Rolie Polie Olie: Polka Dot! Polka Dot! (board book) (2000)
5. Snowie Rolie (2000)
6. Rolie Polie Olie - Character Books: Olie, Spot, Zowie, Billie (2001)
7. Sleepy Time Olie (2001)
8. Big Time Olie (2002)
9. Busy Books - Peakaboo You!, Rolie Polie Shapes, Be My Pal!, Rocket Up, Rolie! (2002)

==== The Guardians of Childhood series ====
===== Novels =====
1. Nicholas St. North and the Battle of the Nightmare King, written with Laura Geringer (2011)
2. E. Aster Bunnymund and the Warrior Eggs at the Earth's Core! (2012)
3. Toothiana: Queen of the Tooth Fairy Armies (2012)
4. The Sandman and the War of Dreams (2013)
5. Jack Frost: The End Becomes the Beginning (2018)

===== Picture books =====
1. The Man in the Moon (2011)
2. The Sandman: The Story of Sanderson Mansnoozie (2012)
3. Jack Frost (2015)

== Filmography ==
=== Film ===
Year	Title	Role	Notes
1995	Toy Story		Conceptual and art design
1997	Buddy	Screenwriter, co-producer	Screen story
1998	A Bug's Life		Conceptual and art design
2005	Robots	Writer, (Note: Uncredited.) producer, production designer	
2007	Meet the Robinsons	Writer, (Note: The original book A Day with Wilbur Robinson.) executive producer	
2007	Mr. Magorium's Wonder Emporium	Production designer	Main title sequence design
2011	The Fantastic Flying Books of Mr. Morris Lessmore	Director, writer	Short film
2012	Rise of the Guardians	Writer, (Note: The original books The Guardians of Childhood and The Man in the Moon.) executive producer	
2013	Epic	Writer, production designer, executive producer	Co-written with James V. Hart, Daniel Shere, Tom J. Astle, Matt Ember and Chris Wedge
2013	The Scarecrow	Executive producer	
2013	The Numberlys	Director, writer	
2014	Silent	Executive producer	
2014	The Cask of Amontillado	Director	
2022	Mr. Spam Gets a New Hat	Director, writer	
TBA	The Great Gatsby	Director	Animated film adaptation

=== Television series ===
Year	Title	Notes
1998–2004	Rolie Polie Olie	Created by, based on the book series of the same name
2000–2003	George Shrinks	Created by, based on the book of the same name
2022	Lost Ollie	Based on the book Ollie's Odyssey
