= List of animated television series of 1987 =

A list of animated television series first aired in 1987.

Animated television series first aired in 1987
Title	Seasons	Episodes	Country	Year	Original Channel	Technique
The Adventures of Spot	2	26	United Kingdom	1987–93	BBC	Traditional
The Adventures of Teddy Ruxpin	2	65	Canada; United States	1987	Syndication	Traditional
ALF: The Animated Series	2	26	United States	1987–89	NBC	Traditional
Allsorts	9	296	United Kingdom	1987–95	ITV	Live action
Beverly Hills Teens	1	65	United States; Canada	1987	Syndication	Traditional
Bionic Six	2	65	United States; Japan	1987	Syndication	Traditional
BraveStarr	1	65	United States	1987–88	Syndication	Traditional
Clever Raccoon Dog		82	North Korea	1987–present	Korean Central Television	Traditional
The Comic Strip	1	65	United States	1987	Syndication	Traditional
Creepy Crawlies	1	52	United Kingdom	1987–89	ITV	Stop-Motion
Dinosaucers	1	65	United States; Canada	1987	Syndication	Traditional
Dirty King Adventure	1	13	China	1987		Traditional
Dooly the Little Dinosaur	2	13	South Korea	1987–88	KBS1	Traditional
DuckTales (1987)	4	100	United States	1987–90	Disney Channel (1987); Syndication	Traditional
Edward and Friends	1	28	United Kingdom	1987	BBC2	Stop-Motion
Fireman Sam	15	309	United Kingdom	1987–present	S4C; BBC1 (series 1–4); CBeebies (series 5); Cartoonito (series 6–present); Channel 5 (series 8–present)	Stop-motion (1987–2005); CGI (2008–present)
Foxy Fables	1	13	Israel	1987–88	Syndication	Stop-motion
Fraggle Rock: The Animated Series	1	13	United States	1987	NBC	Traditional
HBO Storybook Musicals	1	18	United States	1987–93	HBO	Traditional
Hello Kitty's Furry Tale Theater	1	13	United States; Canada; Japan	1987	CBS	Traditional
Lady Lovely Locks and the Pixietails	1	20	United States	1987–88	Syndication	Traditional
The Little Clowns of Happytown	1	18	United States	1987–88	ABC	Traditional
Little Wizards	1	13	United States	1987–88	ABC	Traditional
Marias barn	1	24	Sweden	1987	SVT1	Traditional
Maxie's World	1	32	United States	1987	Syndication	Traditional
Mighty Mouse: The New Adventures	2	19	United States	1987–88	CBS	Traditional
My Pet Monster	1	13	Canada	1987	ABC	Traditional
The New Archies	1	13	United States	1987	NBC	Traditional
Once Upon a Time... Life	1	26	France	1987–88	Canal+	Traditional
Ovide and the Gang	1	65	Canada; Belgium	1987–89	Télévision de Radio-Canada	Traditional
Le Piaf	1	200	France	1987	Canal+	Traditional
Plonsters	2	61	Germany	1987–97	Syndication	Stop-Motion
The Pondles	1	13	United Kingdom	1987	CITV; Nickelodeon (1994)	Traditional
Popeye and Son	1	13	United States	1987	CBS	Traditional
Professor Panda Says...			Hong Kong	1987	TVB	Traditional
Rahan, fils des âges farouches	1	26	France	1987	Canal+	Traditional
Saber Rider and the Star Sheriffs	1	52	United States; Japan	1987–88	Syndication	Traditional
The Shoe People	2	52	United Kingdom	1987–93	TV-am; CITV; S4C; The Children's Channel	Traditional
Sky Commanders	1	13	United States; Japan	1987	Syndication	Traditional
Spiral Zone	1	65	United States	1987	Syndication	Traditional
Square One Television	5	230	United States	1987–92	PBS	Live action/Traditional/CGI
Starcom: The U.S. Space Force	1	13	United States; Canada	1987	Syndication	Traditional
Sylvanian Families	1	13	United States; Canada	1987	Syndication	Traditional
Teenage Mutant Ninja Turtles (1987)	10	193	United States	1987–96	Syndication (1987–91); CBS (1990–96)	Traditional
TigerSharks	1	26	United States	1987	Syndication	Traditional
Visionaries: Knights of the Magical Light	1	13	United States	1987	Syndication	Traditional
Wimpole Village	1	16	United Kingdom	1987	ITV	Traditional/Cut-Outs
Wisdom of the Gnomes	1	26	Spain	1987–88	TVE1	Traditional

Anime television series first aired in 1987

Title	Seasons	Episodes	Year	Original Channel	Notes
Bikkuriman	1	75	1987–89	ANN	
City Hunter	1	51	1987–88		
Fist of the North Star 2	1	43	1987–88		
Grimm's Fairy Tale Classics	1	24	1987–88	ANN	
Hiatari Ryōkō!	1	48	1987–88		
Kamen no Ninja Akakage	1	23	1987–88		
Kimagure Orange Road	1	48	1987–88		
Lady Lady!!	1	21	1987–88		
Machine Robo: Battle Hackers	1	31	1987		
Mami the Psychic	1	119	1987–89		
Metal Armor Dragonar	1	48	1987–88		
Mister Ajikko	1	99	1987–89		
New Maple Town Stories: Palm Town Chapter	1	50	1987		
Norakuro-kun	1	50	1987–88		
Oraa Guzura Dado	1	44	1987–88		
Ox Tales	1	52	1987–88		Co-produced in Hebrew and the United States
Tales of Little Women	1	48	1987		
The Three Musketeers Anime	1	52	1987–89		
Transformers: The Headmasters	1	35	1987–88		
Tsuide ni Tonchinkan	1	43	1987–88		
Ultra B	1	119	1987–89		
Zillion	1	31	1987		

== See also ==
- List of animated feature films of 1987
- List of Japanese animation television series of 1987
