= List of Kimagure Orange Road episodes =

Following is the list of the 48 episodes and eight OVAs (Original video animations) of the Japanese shōnen romantic comedy manga and anime series Kimagure Orange Road.

== TV episode list ==
No.	Title	Original release date
1	"Transfer Student! Humble First Love!" "転校生!恥ずかしながら初恋します (Tenkousei! Hazukashi nagara hatsukoi shimasu)"	April 6, 1987
2	"Just a Little Lemon Kiss" "あの娘にちょっぴりレモンのキスを (Anokoni choppiri remon no kisu wo)"	April 13, 1987
3	"Mood Swings - Rowing First Date" "気分はゆれてローリング初デート (Kibun ha yurete ro-ringu hatsu de-to)"	April 20, 1987
4	"Hikaru-chan?! The Disturbing "C" Experience!" "ひかるちゃん!?お騒がせのC体験 (Hikaruchan!? Osawagase no C taiken)"	April 27, 1987
5	"Two People's Secret - The Part-Time Job" "二人のひみつ、とまどいアルバイト (Futari no himitsu, Tomadoi arubaito)"	May 4, 1987
6	"That Guy is a Rival! Love's Midterm Exam!" "あいつがライバル、恋の中間試験 (Aitsu ga raibaru, Koi no chuukan shiken)"	May 11, 1987
7	"Madoka's Private Life - A Spark-Colored Kiss!" "まどかの私生活!?口づけスパーク色 (Madoka no shiseikatsu!? Kuchiduke supa-ku iro)"	May 18, 1987
8	"Your Smile! Shutter Chance at the Beach" "君は笑顔!渚のシャッターチャンス (Kimi ha egao! Nagisa no shatta-chansu)"	May 25, 1987
9	"Kurumi-chan's How To Date!" "くるみちゃんデートの仕方教えます (Kurumichan de-to no shikata oshie masu)"	June 1, 1987
10	"A Premonition! Hikaru-chan Will Die!" "予知夢!?ひかるちゃんが死んじゃう (Yochimu!? Hikaruchan ga shinjau)"	June 8, 1987
11	"Don't Ring the Wedding Bells!" "鳴らさないで!ウエディングベル (Narasa naide! Wedding bell)"	June 15, 1987
12	"Study Abroad in America! Goodbye Madoka!" "アメリカ留学!サヨナラまどか (Amerika ryuugaku! SAYONARA Madoka.)"	June 22, 1987
13	"Everyone is Looking! Hikaru's Super Transformation!" "視線集中!ひかるちゃん大変身 (Sisen shuuchuu! Hikaruchan daihenshin)"	June 29, 1987
14	"A Foreboding Dream! Madoka and Kyosuke are Breaking Up At Last!" "予知夢!まどかと恭介ついに破局! (Yochimu! Madoka to Kyousuke tsuini hakyoku)"	July 6, 1987
15	"Madoka's Ultimate Decision! Putting a Period to the Love Triangle" "まどかの決心!三角関係にピリオド (Madoka no kesshin! Sankaku Kankei ni piriodo)"	July 13, 1987
16	"Well, Do You Believe or Not? Madoka Saw a UFO" "信じる信じないUFOを見たまどか (Shinjiru Shinjinai UFO wo mita Madoka)"	July 20, 1987
17	"The Summer Temptation - A Double Date Out Of the Blue" "夏の誘惑!いきなりダブルデート (Natsu no yuuwaku! Ikinari daburu de-to)"	July 27, 1987
18	"Madoka's Challenge! The Haunted Beach Big Wave Legend" "まどか挑戦!幽霊海岸の大波伝説 (Madoka chousen! yuurei kaigan no oo nami densetsu)"	August 3, 1987
19	"The Couple's Experience—Forbidden Island of Love!" "二人の体験!禁じられた恋の島 (Futari no taiken! Kinjirareta koi no shima)"	August 10, 1987
20	"Hikaru Witnesses! The Camp is Full of Danger!" "ひかる目撃!合宿は危険がいっぱい (Hikaru mokugeki! Gasshuku ha kiken ga ippai)"	August 17, 1987
21	"Kyosuke in a Pinch! Sweet Nothings at the Wuthering Heights!" "恭介ピンチ!嵐が丘の甘いささやき (Kyousuke pinchi! Arashi ga oka no amai sasayaki)"	August 24, 1987
22	"An Adult Relationship? Madoka Secretly Returns Home in the Morning!" "大人の関係!?まどか秘密の朝帰り (Otona no kankei!? Madoka himitsu no asagaeri)"	August 31, 1987
23	"Kyosuke and Madoka in a Big Fight! The 3-Legged Race of Love!" "恭介まどか大ゲンカ!恋の二人三脚 (Kyousuke Madoka oo genka! Koi no ninin sankyaku)"	September 7, 1987
24	"Introducing Kazuya! Be Careful Around the "Panic Kid"!" "一弥登場!パニックキッドにご用心 (Kazuya toujou! Panic Kid ni go youjin)"	September 14, 1987
25	"Risky Self-Hypnosis! Kyosuke Changed!" "あぶない自己暗示!恭介くん変身す (Abunai jikoanji! Kyousukekun henshin su)"	September 21, 1987
26	"Kyosuke Becomes a Kid! Getting Super-Close to Madoka!" "子供になった恭介!まどかに大接近 (Kodomo ni natta kyousuke! Madoka ni dai sekkin)"	September 28, 1987
27	"Marked Woman Madoka! Kyosuke, Proving He's a Man!" "ねらわれたまどか!恭介男の証明 (Nerawareta Madoka! Kyousuke otoko no shoumei)"	October 5, 1987
28	"Dangerous Decision! Manami-chan's Big Adventure!" "危険な決心!まなみちゃんの大冒険 (Kiken na kesshin! Manamichan no dai bouken)"	October 12, 1987
29	"Don't Cry, Jingoro! The Heat of Young Love!" "泣くなジンゴロ!愛と青春の発情期 (Nakuna jingoro! Ai to seishun no hatsujouki)"	October 19, 1987
30	"A Tender Little Story - Kurumi's First Love, Chapter "Hell"!" "木の葉物語!くるみの初恋·地獄編 (Konoha monogatari! Kurumi no hatsukoi, jigoku hen)"	October 26, 1987
31	"Madoka and Yuusaku - The Marching Song of Runaway Youths" "まどかと勇作!青春かけおち行進曲 (Madoka to Yuusaku! Seishun kakeochi koushin kyoku)"	November 2, 1987
32	"Will My Birthday Come Twice? Time-Runner Kyosuke" "誕生日は二度来る!?時をかける恭介 (Tanjoubi ha nido kuru!? Toki wo kakeru Kyousuke)"	November 9, 1987
33	"Strange Madoka! The Mushroom of 120% Truth!" "妖しのまどか!キノコで本音120% (Ayashi no Madoka! Kinoko de honne hyaku nijuu %)"	November 16, 1987
34	"Roots Panic! Madoka in the Mysterious Homeland" "ルーツパニック、不思議の里のまどか (Roots panic Fushigi no sato no Madoka)"	November 23, 1987
35	"Perverted With a Camera! Robo-Kyosuke!" "カメラでエッチ!ロボット恭ちゃん (Camera de ecchi! Robot Kyouchan)"	November 30, 1987
36	"Adios, Kyosuke! Paranormal Powers Caught On Video!" "さらば恭介!ビデオに写った超能力 (Saraba Kyousuke! Video ni utsutta chounouryoku)"	December 7, 1987
37	"Heroic Orange Legend - Madoka's Duel in the Blizzard" "オレンジ仁侠伝!まどか吹雪の対決 (Orange ninkyou den! Madoka fubuki no taiketsu)"	December 14, 1987
38	"Kyosuke Timetrips! The Third Christmas" "恭介時間旅行!3度目のクリスマス (Kyosuke jikan ryokou! san do me no Christmas)"	December 21, 1987
39	"Hypnotizing Madoka - Kyosuke's Dangerous New Year" "まどかに催眠術!恭介あぶない正月 (Madoka ni saimin jutsu! Kyousuke abunai shougatsu)"	January 4, 1988
40	"First Dream of the New Year - Giant Monster Jingoro's Counterattack" "初夢だよ!大怪獣ジンゴロの逆襲 (Hatsu yume dayo! Dai kaijuu Jingoro no gyakushuu)"	January 11, 1988
41	"Immobilized Madoka - Kyosuke's Mysterious Watch" "動けないまどか!恭介のフシギ時計 (Ugoke nai Madoka! Kyousuke no fushigi dokei)"	January 18, 1988
42	"Madoka the Popular - Kyosuke Finally Confesses" "モテモテのまどか!恭介ついに告白 (Motemote no Madoka! Kyousuke tsuini kokuhaku)"	January 25, 1988
43	"Heartbroken Hikaru - Follow Her to the Winter Beach" "傷心のひかる!追いかけて冬海岸 (Shoushin no Hikaru! Oikake te fuyu kaigan)"	February 1, 1988
44	"The Taste of Love? Kyosuke's Valentine from HELL!!" "恋のお味?恭介地獄のバレンタイン (Koi no oaji? Kyousuke jigoku no Valentine)"	February 8, 1988
45	"Goodbye Hikaru - And Then There Were None" "ひかる死す、そして誰もいなくなった (Hikaru shi su Soshite Daremo inaku natta)"	February 15, 1988
46	"One Snow-White Night - Two Alone in a Gondola" "白銀の一夜!二人ぼっちでゴンドラ (Hakugin no ichi ya! Futari bocchi de Gondola)"	February 22, 1988
47	"A Presentiment of Farewells - Find Madoka's First Love" "さよならの予感、まどかの初恋を探せ (Sayonara no yokan Madoka no hatsukoi wo sagase)"	February 29, 1988
48	"I Found Love! and Repeat From Beginning." "恋つかまえた、そしてダ·カーポ (Koi tsukamaeta soshite da ka-po)"	March 7, 1988

== OVA list ==
=== OVA 1 ===
Theme songs:

- Opening: "The Actress in the Mirror" (鏡の中のアクトレス, Kagami no Naka no Akutoresu)
  - Vocals: Meiko Nakahara
  - Lyrics: Meiko Nakahara
  - Composer: Meiko Nakahara
  - Arrangement: Akira Nishihara
- Ending: "Dance in the Memories"
  - Vocals: Meiko Nakahara
  - Lyrics: Meiko Nakahara
  - Composer: Meiko Nakahara
  - Arrangement: Akira Nishihara

No.	Title	Original release date
1	"White Lovers" "白い恋人たち (Shiroi Koibito-tachi)"	March 1, 1989
2	"Hawaiian Suspense" "ハワイアン・サスペンス (Hawaian Sasupensu)"	April 1, 1989

=== OVA 2 ===
Theme songs:

- Opening: "Choose Me" (チューズ・ミー, Chūzu Mī)
  - Vocals: Yuiko Tsubakura
  - Lyrics: Show
  - Composer: Kazuya Izumi
  - Arrangement: Shirō Sagisu
- Ending: "Sometimes Blue" (ときどきBlue, Tokidoki Burū)
  - Vocals: Yuka Tachibana
  - Lyrics: Ryū Sawachi
  - Composer: Shirō Sagisu
  - Arrangement: Shirō Sagisu
- Insert: "Gazing Wind" (風のまなざし, Kaze no Manazashi) (only in "Stage of Love" episodes)
  - Vocals: Yuiko Tsubakura
  - Lyrics: Show
  - Composer: Shirō Sagisu
  - Arrangement: Shirō Sagisu

No.	Title	Original release date
3	"I Was a Cat; I Was a Fish" "吾輩は猫であったり おサカナであったり (Wagahai wa Neko De Attari O-sakana de Atari)"	December 27, 1989
4	"Hurricane! Akane the Shape-changing Girl" "ハリケーン! 変身少女あ・か・ね (Harikēn! Henshin Shōjo A-ka-ne)"	February 1, 1990
5	"Stage of Love=Heart on Fire! Spring is for Idols" "恋のステージ=HEART ON FIRE! 〈春はアイドル!〉 (Koi no Sutēji = Hāto on Faia! Haru wa Aidoru!)"	May 1, 1990
6	"Stage of Love=Heart on Fire! Birth of a Star" "恋のステージ=HEART ON FIRE! 〈スタア誕生!〉 (Koi no Sutēji = Hāto on Faia! Sutaa Tanjō!)"	July 1, 1990

=== OVA 3 ===
Theme songs:

- Opening: "Choose Me" (チューズ・ミー, Chūzu Mī)
  - Vocals: Yuiko Tsubakura
  - Lyrics: Show
  - Composer: Kazuya Izumi
  - Arrangement: Shirō Sagisu
- Ending: "Yesterday Once More" (もうひとつのイエスタデイ, Mō Hitotsu no Iesutadei)
  - Vocals: Kanako Wada
  - Lyrics: Reiko Yukawa
  - Composer: Yūichirō Oda
  - Arrangement: Jun Irie

No.	Title	Original release date
7	"An Unexpected Situation" "思いがけないシチュエーション (Omoigakenai Shichuēshon)"	January 18, 1991
8	"Message in Rouge" "ルージュの伝言 (Rūju no Dengon)"	January 18, 1991

== See also ==
- Kimagure Orange Road
- List of Kimagure Orange Road soundtracks
