= 1988 in anime =

The events of 1988 in anime. The final full year of the Shōwa era.

== Accolades ==
- Ōfuji Noburō Award: My Neighbor Totoro

== Releases ==
Released	Title	Type	Director	Studio	Ref
January 9	Himitsu no Akko-chan	TV series	Hiroki Shibata	Toei Animation	
January 10	Little Lord Fauntleroy	TV series	Kōzō Kusuba	Nippon Animation	
February 5	Leina: Wolf Sword Legend	OVA series	Takao Kato, Nobuyoshi Habara, Kiyoshi Murayama	Ashi Productions	
February 6	Maison Ikkoku: The Final Chapter	Film	Tomomi Mochizuki	Ajia-do Animation Works	
February 6	Legend of the Galactic Heroes: My Conquest is the Sea of Stars	Film	Noboru Ishiguro	Madhouse, Artland	
February 6	Ultimate Teacher	OVA film	Toyoo Ashida	J.C.Staff	
February 6	Urusei Yatsura: The Final Chapter	Film	Tetsu Dezaki	Magic Bus	
February 13	Osomatsu-kun	TV series	Akira Shigino	Studio Pierrot	
February 25	Aura Battler Dunbine: The Tale of Neo Byston Well	OVA series	Toshifumi Takizawa	Sunrise	
February 25	Dragon's Heaven	OVA series	Makoto Kobayashi	AIC Artmic	
February 25	Sakigake!! Otokojuku	TV series	Nobutaka Nishizawa	Toei Animation	
February 25	Salamander	OVA series	Hisayuki Toriumi	Studio Pierrot	
March 1	Xanadu: The Legend of Dragon Slayer	OVA film	Atsutoshi Umezawa	Toei Animation	
March 3	Tsurupika Hagemaru	TV series	Hiroshi Sasagawa	Shin-Ei Animation	
March 9	F	TV series	Koichi Mashimo	Studio Deen	
March 11	Harbor Light Story Fashion Lala yori	OVA film	Motosuke Takahashi	Studio Pierrot	
March 12	Bikkuriman: Taiichiji Seima Taisen	Short film	Hiroyuki Kakudou	Toei Animation	
March 12	Doraemon: The Record of Nobita's Parallel Visit to the West	Film	Tsutomu Shibayama	Shin-Ei Animation	
March 12	Esper Mami: Hoshizora no Dancing Doll	Film	Keiichi Hara	Shin-Ei Animation	
March 12	The Heated Battle of the Gods	Film	Shigeyasu Yamauchi	Toei Animation	
March 12	Mobile Suit Gundam: Char's Counterattack	Film	Yoshiyuki Tomino	Sunrise	
March 12	Mobile Suit SD Gundam	Short film	Osamu Sekita	Sunrise	
March 14	The Burning Wild Man	TV series	Osamu Kobayashi	Studio Pierrot	
March 19	Armored Trooper VOTOMS: The Red Shoulder Document: Roots of Ambition	OVA film	Ryosuke Takahashi	Sunrise	
March 25	Aim for the Ace! 2	OVA series	Noboru Furuse	Tokyo Movie Shinsha	
March 26	The Adventures of Scamper the Penguin	Film	Kinjiro Yoshida, Gennady Sokolskiy	Soyuzmultfilm, Life Work Corp, Sovinfilm, Aist Corporation	
March 27	Kiteretsu Daihyakka	TV series	Hiro Katsuoka, Keiji Hayakawa	Studio Gallop	
April 2	City Hunter 2	TV series	Kanetsugu Kodama	Sunrise	
April 5	Wowser	TV series	Keiichiro Mochizuki	Telescreen Japan	
April 9	Dagon in the Land of Weeds	TV series	Kazuyoshi Yokota	Nippon Animation	
April 12	Transformers: Super-God Masterforce	TV series	Tetsuo Imazawa	Toei Animation	
April 13	Sonic Soldier Borgman	TV series	Kiyoshi Murayama	Ashi Production	
April 15	What's Michael?	TV series	Satoru Akahori	Kitty Films	
April 15	Mashin Hero Wataru	TV series	Shūji Iuchi	Sunrise	
April 16	My Neighbor Totoro	Film	Hayao Miyazaki	Studio Ghibli	
April 16	Grave of the Fireflies	Film	Isao Takahata	Studio Ghibli	
April 21	Appleseed	OVA film	Kazuyoshi Katayama	Gainax	
April 25	Patlabor: Early Days	OVA series	Mamoru Oshii, Naoyuki Yoshinaga	Studio Deen	
April 27	Topo Gigio	TV series	Noboru Ishiguro, Shigeo Koshi	Nippon Animation	
April 29	Spirit Warrior	OVA series	Ichiro Itano, Katsuhito Akiyama	AIC	
April 30	Legendary Armor Samurai Troopers	TV series	Masashi Ikeda, Mamoru Hamatsu	Sunrise	
May 12	Hello! Lady Lynn	TV series	Hiroshi Shidara	Toei Animation	
May 25	Mahjong Hishō-den: Naki no Ryū	OVA series	Tetsu Dezaki	Gainax	
May 27	Dominion	OVA series	Kōichi Mashimo	Agent 21	
May 25	Balthus - Tia's Radiance	OVA	Yukihiro Makino	Kusama Art	
May 25	Mobile Suit SD Gundam	OVA series		Sunrise	
June	Toyama Sakura Space Book – His Name is Gold	OVA film	Atsutoshi Umezawa	Toei Animation	
June 5	Godmars: The Untold Legend	OVA film	Masakatsu Iijima	Tokyo Movie Shinsha	
June 20	Project A-ko 3: Cinderella Rhapsody	OVA film	Yuji Moriyama	Studio Fantasia	
June 21	Zillion: Burning Night	OVA film	Mizuho Nishikubo	Tatsunoko Production, Production I.G	
July 2	Ironfist Chinmi	TV series	Jutaro Oba	Ashi Productions	
July 7	Natsufuku no Shōjo-tachi	TV special	Toshio Hirata, Yoshiyuki Momose	Madhouse	
July 9	Bikkuriman: Moen Zone no Himitsu	Film	Junichi Sato	Toei Animation	
July 9	Dragon Ball: Mystical Adventure	Film	Kazuhisa Takenouchi	Toei Animation	
July 16	Akira	Film	Katsuhiro Otomo	Tokyo Movie Shinsha	
July 21	Ryūko, the Girl with the White Flag	Film	Tetsu Dezaki	Magic Bus	
July 21	Vampire Princess Miyu	OVA series	Toshiki Hirano	Anime International Company	
July 23	Saint Seiya: Legend of Crimson Youth	Film	Shigeyasu Yamauchi	Toei Animation	
July 23	Sakigake!! Otokojuku	Film	Shigeyasu Yamauchi	Toei Animation	
July 25	The Tokyo Project	OVA film	Osamu Yamasaki	Minamimachi Bugyosho Co., Ltd.	
July 25	What's Michael? 2	OVA	Yoriyasu Kogawa	Kitty Films	
July 31	Bride of Deimos	OVA	Rintaro	Madhouse	
August 12	Watt Poe and Our Story	OVA film	Shigenori Kageyama	Kaname Production	
August 23	Fair, then Partly Piggy	Short film	Toshio Hirata	Oh! Production	
September 15	Raining Fire	Film	Seiji Arihara	Mushi Production	
September 23	Kosuke and Rikimaru: Dragon of Konpei Island	OVA film	Toyoo Ashida	J.C. Staff	
September 25	Through the Passing Seasons	OVA film	Naoyuki Yoshinaga	Kitty Films	
September	Crying Freeman	OVA series	Daisuke Nishio et al.	Toei Animation	
October 1	Hiatari Ryoko! Ka - su - mi: Yume no Naka ni Kimi ga Ita	Film	Minoru Maeda	Group TAC	
October 2	New Grimm Masterpiece Theater	TV series	Hiroshi Saito	Nippon Animation	
October 3	Soreike! Anpanman	TV series	Akinori Nagaoka, Shunji Ôga	Tokyo Movie Shinsha	
October 7	Gunbuster	OVA series	Hideaki Anno	Gainax, Studio Fantasia	
October 7	Yume Miru Topo Gigio	TV series	Noboru Ishiguro, Shigeo Koshi	Nippon Animation	
October 8	Kimagure Orange Road: I Want to Return to That Day	Film	Tomomi Mochizuki	Studio Pierrot	
October 17	Oishinbo	TV series	Yoshio Takeuchi	Shin-Ei Animation	
October 25	Demon City Shinjuku	OVA film	Yoshiaki Kawajiri	Madhouse	
October 25	Starship Troopers	OVA series	Tetsurō Amino	Sunrise, Bandai Visual	
October 26	Dragon Century	OVA series	Kiyoshi Fukugawa	Anime International Company	
November 2	Stardust War	Film	Katsuhito Akiyama	AIC, Artmic	
November 21	Armor Hunter Mellowlink	OVA series	Takeyuki Kanda	Sunrise	
November 21	Tama & Friends: Third Street Story	OVA series	Tsuneo Maeda	Group TAC	
November 26	Hades Project Zeorymer	OVA series	Toshihiro Hirano	AIC, Half H.P. Studio	
December 2	One-Pound Gospel	OVA film	Makura Saki	Studio Gallop	
December 16	Metal Skin Panic MADOX-01	OVA film	Shinji Aramaki	Anime International Company	
December 18	Ganbare! Mōdōken Serve	TV special	Seiji Okuda	Tama Production	
December 21	Fairy King	OVA film	Katsuhisa Yamada	Madhouse	
December 21	Legend of the Galactic Heroes	OVA series	Noboru Ishiguro	Artland, Magic Bus, Madhouse	
December 21	Space Family Carlvinson	OVA film	Kimio Yabuki	Doga Kobo	
December 21	Violence Jack: Evil Town	OVA film	Ichiro Itano	D.A.S.T., Soei Shinsha, Studio88	
	Purple Eyes in the Dark	OVA music video	Mizuho Nishikubo	Toei Animation, Youmex	

== Births ==
- February 4 - Ayano Niina, voice actress
- February 19 - Miyu Irino, voice actor
- March 16 - Azusa Kataoka, voice actress
- April 15 - Manami Numakura, voice actress
- June 2 - Ayaka Saitō, voice actress
- June 11 - Yui Aragaki, voice actress
- July 11 - Yuka Iguchi, voice actress
- July 12 - Risa Taneda, voice actress
- August 9 - Nozomi Yamamoto, voice actress
- September 16 - Shizuka Hasegawa, voice actress
- October 27 - Juri Nagatsuma, voice actress
- November 11 - Mikako Komatsu, voice actress
- December 6 - Nobunaga Shimazaki, voice actor
- December 14 - Ayumu Murase, voice actor
- December 26 - Arisa Noto, voice actress

== See also ==
- 1988 in animation
