= 1988 in animation =

Events in 1988 in animation.

== Events ==
=== January ===
- January 10: The Simpsons short "Grampa and the Kids" first airs and Grampa Simpson makes his debut.
- January 17: The first episode of The New Adventures of Winnie the Pooh airs, produced by the Walt Disney Company.
- January 29: The Peanuts television special Snoopy! The Musical airs on CBS. It is an animated adaptation of the 1975 musical play of the same name.

=== March ===
- March 2: The final episode of Maison Ikkoku airs.
- March 9: The first episode of F airs.
- March 18: Pound Puppies and the Legend of Big Paw premiers.
- March 27: The first episode of Kiteretsu Daihyakka airs.

=== April ===
- April 11: 60th Academy Awards: The Man Who Planted Trees by Frédéric Back wins the Academy Award for Best Animated Short Film.
- April 16:
  - Hayao Miyazaki releases his film My Neighbor Totoro.
  - Isao Takahata releases his film Grave of the Fireflies.

=== June ===
- June 6: Donald Wildmon, head of the American Family Association, accuses the Mighty Mouse: The New Adventures episode "The Littlest Tramp" of depicting cocaine use. In reality, he misinterpreted the scene out of context, but the controversy eventually led to the series being canceled in October.
- June 22: Robert Zemeckis' Who Framed Roger Rabbit is released, which marks the debut of Roger Rabbit, Jessica Rabbit, Benny the Cab and Baby Herman. The film revived public interest for the Golden Age of American animation, which will benefit many upcoming animated feature films and television series.

=== July ===
- July 16: Akira is released, which will later become a cult classic and largely be responsible for making anime popular outside of Japan.
- July 25: American child actress Judith Barsi and her mother Maria was murdered by József Barsi in an apparent murder–suicide.

=== August ===
- August 3: Jan Švankmajer releases his film Alice, which will become a cult classic.

=== September ===
- September 6: The first episode of Count Duckula airs.
- September 12: The first episode of Denver, the Last Dinosaur airs.
- September 17: The first episode of Garfield and Friends airs on CBS, based on the comic strip Garfield.
- September 24: The Looney Tunes compilation film Daffy Duck's Quackbusters premieres in theaters. This was Mel Blanc's final role in the Looney Tunes/Merrie Melodies franchise as he sadly passed away the following year.
- September 27: The Peanuts television special It's the Girl in the Red Truck, Charlie Brown airs on CBS, which gained negative attention for the inter-species storyline being subjected in a Peanuts special before putting it in obscurity in the 2000s.

=== October ===
- October 3:
  - The first episode of Anpanman airs.
  - The first episode of The Smoggies airs.
- October 17: The first episode of Oishinbo airs.
- October 20: The first episode of Charlie Chalk airs.
- October 29: The Michael Jackson film Moonwalker is released direct-to-video, featuring claymation in some scenes, produced by Will Vinton.

=== November ===
- November 18:
  - Don Bluth releases The Land Before Time. This film is generally acclaimed and became Bluth's most popular and longest running franchise to date.
  - The Walt Disney Company releases Oliver & Company.
- November 20: The Simpsons short "The Bart Simpson Show" first airs and Itchy and Scratchy make their debuts.
- November 22: Garfield: His 9 Lives premieres on CBS, it is an animated adaption of the 1984 book of the same name.

=== December ===
- December 10: Garfield and Friends concludes its first season on CBS with the episodes "Forget Me Not/I Like Having You Around!/Sales Resistance".

=== Specific date unknown ===
- The first episode of Bobobobs airs.
- The first episode of Sharky & George airs.
- Mark Baker releases The Hill Farm.
- The Tom and Jerry cartoons by Gene Deitch are finally being televised. After over two decades, the legal issues from Rembrandt Films in Czechoslovakia were resolved .

== Awards ==
- Mainichi Film Award for Best Film: My Neighbor Totoro

== Films released ==
- February 6:
  - Legend of the Galactic Heroes: My Conquest is the Sea of Stars (Japan)
  - Maison Ikkoku: The Final Chapter (Japan)
  - Ultimate Teacher (Japan)
  - Urusei Yatsura: The Final Chapter (Japan)
- February 10 - Black Tulip (Australia)
- February 18 - Captain of the Forest (Hungary)
- March 1 - Xanadu: The Legend of Dragon Slayer (Japan)
- March 11 - Harbor Light Story -From Fashion Lara- (Japan)
- March 12:
  - Doraemon: The Record of Nobita's Parallel Visit to the West (Japan)
  - ESPer Mami: Hoshizora no Dancing Doll (Japan)
  - Mobile Suit Gundam: Char's Counterattack (Japan)
  - Saint Seiya: The Heated Battle of the Gods (Japan)
- March 18:
  - BraveStarr: The Movie (United States)
  - Pound Puppies and the Legend of Big Paw (United States)
- March 19 - Armored Trooper Votoms: The Red Shoulder Document - Roots of Ambition (Japan)
- March 20 - Top Cat and the Beverly Hills Cats (United States)
- March 24:
  - Stowaways on the Ark (West Germany)
  - Treasure Island (Soviet Union)
- April 11 - The Amazing Adventures of the Musketeers (Romania)
- April 16:
  - Grave of the Fireflies (Japan)
  - My Neighbor Totoro (Japan)
- April 21 - Appleseed (Japan)
- May 1 - Westward Ho! (Australia)
- May 3 - The Phantom of the Opera (Ireland)
- May 6 - The Good, the Bad, and Huckleberry Hound (United States)
- May 9 - Prisoner of Zenda (Australia)
- May 13 - Alice (Czechoslovakia)
- May 25 - Mahjong Hishō-den: Naki no Ryū (Japan)
- June - Toyama Sakura Space Book – His Name is Gold (Japan)
- June 15 - Hiawatha (Australia)
- June 20 - Project A-ko 3: Cinderella Rhapsody (Japan)
- June 21 - Zillion: Burning Night (Japan)
- June 22:
  - David and the Magic Pearl (Poland and Sweden)
  - Who Framed Roger Rabbit (United States)
- June 23:
  - Katy Meets the Aliens (Mexico)
  - Peter Pan (Australia)
- June 25 - The Tokyo Project (Japan)
- July 9:
  - Bikkuriman: Moen Zone no Himitsu (Japan)
  - Dragon Ball: Mystical Adventure (Japan)
- July 10 - Alice in Wonderland (Australia)
- July 16 - Akira (Japan)
- July 21 - Ryūko, the Girl with the White Flag (Japan)
- July 23:
  - Saint Seiya: Legend of Crimson Youth (Japan)
  - Sakigake!! Otokojuku (Japan)
- July 25 - What's Michael? 2 (Japan)
- August 12 - Watt Poe and Our Story (Japan)
- September 15 - Raining Fire (Japan)
- September 18 - Rockin' with Judy Jetson (United States)
- September 24 - Daffy Duck's Quackbusters (United States)
- September 25 - Maison Ikkoku: Through the Passing of the Seasons (Japan)
- October 1:
  - Felix the Cat: The Movie (United States, Hungary and Germany)
  - Hiatari Ryōkō! Ka – su – mi: Yume no Naka ni Kimi ga Ita (Japan)
  - Kimagure Orange Road: I Want to Return to That Day (Japan)
- October 16 - Scooby-Doo and the Ghoul School (United States)
- October 18 - The Black Arrow (Australia)
- October 25 - Demon City Shinjuku (Japan)
- November 2 - Gall Force 3: Stardust War (Japan)
- November 13 - Scooby-Doo and the Reluctant Werewolf (United States)
- November 18:
  - The Land Before Time (Ireland and United States)
  - Oliver & Company (United States)
- November 20 - Yogi and the Invasion of the Space Bears (United States)
- November 25 - Around the World in 80 Days (Australia)
- December 2 - One-Pound Gospel (Japan)
- December 10 - Care Bears Nutcracker Suite (Canada)
- December 13 - Wind in the Willows (Australia)
- December 21:
  - Space Family Carlvinson (Japan)
  - Violence Jack: Evil Town (Japan)
  - Yōsei-Ō (Japan)
- Specific date unknown:
  - The Cat Who Walked by Herself (Soviet Union)
  - Crying Freeman (Japan)
  - Forget Me Not (Hungary)
  - Lovely Fatma (Soviet Union)
  - Popol Vuh: The Creation Myth of the Maya (United States)
  - La table tournante (France)

== Television series debuts ==
- January 10:
  - Little Lord Fauntleroy debuts on Fuji TV and ITV.
  - Tatakae!! Ramenman debuts on Nippon TV.
- January 17 - The New Adventures of Winnie the Pooh debuts on Disney Channel and ABC.
- February 3 - Bobobobs debuts on TV3.
- February 13 - Osomatsu-kun debuts on Fuji TV.
- February 25 - Sakigake!! Otokojuku debuts on Fuji TV.
- March 2 - Clifford the Big Red Dog debuts in syndication.
- March 3 - Tsurupika Hagemaru debuts on TV Asahi.
- March 9 - F debuts on Fuji TV.
- March 14 - The Burning Wild Man debuts on Nippon TV.
- March 27 - Kiteretsu Daihyakka debuts on Fuji TV.
- April 2 - City Hunter 2 debuts on Yomiuri TV.
- April 5 - Wowser debuts on TV Tokyo.
- April 9 - Dagon in the Land of Weeds debuts on TV Asahi.
- April 12 - Transformers: Super-God Masterforce debuts on Nippon TV.
- April 13 - Sonic Soldier Borgman debuts on NNS (Nippon TV).
- April 15:
  - Mashin Hero Wataru debuts on Nippon TV and Bandai Channel.
  - What's Michael? debuts on TV Tokyo.
- April 27 - Topo Gigio debuts on TV Asahi (epi. 1–21) and TV Tokyo (epi. 22–34, as Yumemiru Topo Gigio).
- April 30 - Ronin Warriors debuts on ANN (Nagoya TV).
- May 12 - Hello! Lady Lynn debuts on TV Tokyo.
- May 25 - Stories of the Sylvanian Families debuts on Direct-to-Video.
- July 2 - Ironfist Chinmi debuts on TV Asahi.
- September - Robotech II: The Sentinels debuts in syndication.
- September 5 - Tube Mice debuts on Children's ITV strand on ITV.
- September 6 - Count Duckula debuts on ITV (UK) and Nickelodeon (USA).
- September 10:
  - ALF Tales and The Completely Mental Misadventures of Ed Grimley debut on NBC.
  - A Pup Named Scooby-Doo and The New Adventures of Beany and Cecil debut on ABC.
  - Police Academy debuts in syndication.
- September 12:
  - Denver, the Last Dinosaur debuts in syndication and on FR3.
  - Stoppit and Tidyup debuts on BBC One.
  - The New Yogi Bear Show debuts in syndication.
- September 17:
  - Fantastic Max debuts on BBC 1 (UK) and in syndication (USA).
  - Garfield and Friends, Superman, and The Adventures of Raggedy Ann and Andy debut on CBS.
- September 19 - C.O.P.S. debuts in syndication.
- October 1 - Dino-Riders and RoboCop: The Animated Series debut in syndication.
- October 2:
  - Marvel Action Universe debuts in syndication.
  - New Grimm Masterpiece Theater debuts on ANN (ABC).
- October 3:
  - Anpanman debuts on Nippon TV.
  - The Smoggies debuts on Global Television Network, Antenne 2, and Radio-Canada.
- October 9 - Himitsu no Akko-chan debuts on Fuji TV.
- October 13 - Manga Nihon Keizai Nyumon debuts on TV Tokyo.
- October 17 - Oishinbo debuts on Nippon TV.
- October 20 - Charlie Chalk debuts on BBC1.
- October 21 - This Is America, Charlie Brown debuts on CBS.
- November 9 - The Ratties debuts on ITV.
- December 27: - Barney debuts on BBC1.
- Specific date unknown:
  - Mama Ohanishi O Shikikasete debuts on Nippon TV.
  - Nikonikopun debuts on Nippon TV.

== Births ==
=== January ===
- January 7: Robert Sheehan, Irish actor (voice of Ray in the UK version of A Turtle's Tale: Sammy's Adventures).
- January 12: Andrew Lawrence, American actor (voice of T.J. Detweiler in Recess, Carl Finley in The Zeta Project episode "Eye of the Storm", Ben Rogers in the Adventures from the Book of Virtues episode "Work", Vinnie Nasta in The Kids from Room 402 episode "Son of Einstein").
- January 21: John Early, American comedian and actor (voice of Flash in DC League of Super-Pets, Alexander in Big City Greens, Dirk in Tuca & Bertie, Henry Tuntley in The Great North, Augustus in the Central Park episode "Hot Oven").
- January 29: Clifford Chapin, American voice actor (voice of Connie Springer in Attack on Titan, Katsuki Bakugo in My Hero Academia, Cabba in the Funimation dub of Dragon Ball Z, Kaworu Nagisa in the Netflix dub of Neon Genesis Evangelion).

=== February ===
- February 2: Zosia Mamet, American actress (voice of Hekapoo in Star vs. the Forces of Evil, Crimp in Trolls Band Together, Mary in the American Dad episode "My Affair Lady", Amber Lamber in High School USA!, Princess Ladyfingers/General Neytri in the Harley Quinn episode "The Most Culturally Impactful Franchise of All Time", Celia in Regular Show, Yaga in Back to Backspace, Merian in StuGo)
- February 13: Erica Mendez, American actress (voice of Ryuko Matoi in Kill la Kill, Akko in Little Witch Academia, Sailor Uranus in the Viz Media dub of Sailor Moon, Gon Freecss in Hunter x Hunter, Yuuki Konno in Sword Art Online, Diane in The Seven Deadly Sins, Raphtalia in The Rising of the Shield Hero, Retsuko in Aggretsuko, Black Strategy in OK K.O.! Let's Be Heroes).
- February 20: Rihanna, Barbadian singer and actress (voice of Tip in Home, Smurfette in Smurfs).
- February 22: Marieve Herington, Canadian actress and singer (voice of Tilly Green in Big City Greens, Delilah in Delilah & Julius, Sabrina Raincomprix in season 1 of Miraculous: Tales of Ladybug & Cat Noir, Claudette in the Alpha and Omega franchise, Tatsumaki in Season 1 of One-Punch Man, Celeste in the Mickey Mouse Mixed-Up Adventures episode "The Phantom of the Café", Fifi La Fume in Tiny Toons Looniversity).
- February 29: Joel Kim Booster, Korean-American actor (voice of Jingle Jim in Santa Inc., Charles Lu in Big Mouth, Maude's Ex-Girlfriend in the BoJack Horseman episode "The Face of Depression") and producer (Big Mouth).

=== March ===
- March 10: Ego Nwodim, American actress and comedian (voice of Zara in the Agent Elvis episode "Mahgrebi Mint", Dung Beetle Shaman in the Futurama episode "Parasites Regained", Officer Leonard in Diary of a Wimpy Kid Christmas: Cabin Fever, Twiggy in Gabby's Dollhouse: The Movie, Fish Queen in Hoppers, Leah in Baby Shark's Big Movie!).
- March 12: Aleks Le, American actor (voice of Zenitsu Agatsuma in Demon Slayer: Kimetsu no Yaiba, Ake in The Rising of the Shield Hero, Mario Zucchero in JoJo's Bizarre Adventure: Golden Wind, Lilipilin in Sword Art Online, Luka in Power Players).
- March 25: Kristen Bone, Canadian actress (voice of Zowie from Rolie Polie Olie, Snail in Franklin, Flora in Babar, Maggie in Maggie and the Ferocious Beast)
- March 27:
  - Brenda Song, American actress (voice of Anne Boonchuy in Amphibia, Frida in Miles from Tomorrowland, Mitzi Suzuki in Lilo & Stitch: The Series, Vanessa Vue in The Proud Family: Louder and Prouder, Tracey in the American Dragon: Jake Long episode "Bring It On", Wendy in the Phineas and Ferb episode "Unfair Science Fair", Kitty Lynxley in Zootopia 2).
  - Piotr Michael, American actor (voice of Oogway in Kung Fu Panda: The Paws of Destiny, Perry White in Superman: Man of Tomorrow and the Justice League Action episode "Superman's Pal, Sid Sharp", continued voice of Albert "Pop Pop" Loud in The Loud House).

=== April ===
- April 10: Haley Joel Osment, American actor (voice of Chip in Beauty and the Beast: The Enchanted Christmas, Zephyr in The Hunchback of Notre Dame II, Mowgli in The Jungle Book 2, Kash D. Langford in Jurassic World Camp Cretaceous, Takeshi Jin in Immortal Grand Prix, Casey Jones in Rise of the Teenage Mutant Ninja Turtles: The Movie).
- April 13: Katie Lucas, American writer (Star Wars: The Clone Wars).
- April 14: Chris Wood, American actor (voice of He-Man in Masters of the Universe: Revelation).
- April 22: Deven Mack, Canadian actor (voice of King Vangelis in Ninjago, Wynton Styles in Bakugan: Battle Planet, Chef Hatchet in Total DramaRama, Mr. Melvin in Abby Hatcher, Chaz in Go Away, Unicorn!, Dez in Wishfart, Zack Freeman in The Day My Butt Went Psycho!, Zeo Abyss in Beyblade: Metal Fusion, Lab Rat in Grossology).

=== May ===
- May 1: Nicholas Braun, American actor (voice of Devin in Santa Inc., Etan Delvay in the Birdgirl episode "ShareBear", Greg Hirsch in The Simpsons episode "Meat Is Murder").
- May 5: Skye Sweetnam, Canadian singer, actress and music video director (singing voice of Barbie in The Barbie Diaries, performed the theme songs of The Buzz on Maggie, Wayside, and My Life Me).
- May 9: Oliver Grainger, Canadian former child actor (voice of D.W. Read in seasons 4-6 of Arthur, Dongwa Miao in Sagwa, the Chinese Siamese Cat, George Jamell in Mona the Vampire).
- May 13: Caroline Ford, English actress (voice of The Warden in Captain Laserhawk: A Blood Dragon Remix).
- May 16: Jermaine Fowler, American actor, comedian, producer and writer (voice of James Lafayette Jr. in Moon Girl and Devil Dinosaur, Toussaint Louverture in Clone High, Sir Kaue in Princess Power, Bird Town Tour Guide in Tuca & Bertie, Benny in Riverdance: The Animated Adventure, Pete Repeat in BoJack Horseman).
- May 23: Chris Houghton, American animator, illustrator, writer, director, musician, and voice actor (co-creator and voice of Cricket Green in Big City Greens).

=== June ===
- June 1: Cody Ruegger, American former voice actor and son of Tom Ruegger (voice of Loud Kiddington in Histeria!, Little Blue Bird in Animaniacs).
- June 2: Awkwafina, American actress (voice of Sisu in Raya and the Last Dragon, Ms. Tarantula in The Bad Guys franchise, Quail in Storks, Carmen and Dr. Chang in The Simpsons, Courtney in The Angry Birds Movie 2, skekLach in The Dark Crystal: Age of Resistance, Otto in The SpongeBob Movie: Sponge on the Run, Sky, Areola, and Turd in The Boys Presents: Diabolical, Apple in the Regular Show episode "Hello China", Annie in the Animals. episode "Roachella", Bertie's Left Boob in the Tuca & Bertie episode "The Promotion").
- June 7: Michael Cera, Canadian actor and musician (voice of Little Gizmo in Rolie Polie Olie, Josh Spitz in Braceface, Brother Bear in The Berenstain Bears, Todd in Wayside: The Movie, Barry in Sausage Party, Robin in The Lego Batman Movie, Matthew in Cryptozoo, Boy Boy in The Ripping Friends, Great Wide Wonder in The Boys Presents: Diabolical episode "I'm Your Pusher", Benjamin in the Anne of Green Gables: The Animated Series episode "The Best Partner", Scrotch in the Tom Goes to the Mayor episode "Undercover", Nick in The Simpsons episode "The Daughter Also Rises", additional voices in Pecola).
- June 9:
  - Lauren Landa, American actress (voice of Sailor Neptune in the Viz Media dub of Sailor Moon, Kyoko Sakura in Puella Magi Madoka Magica, Annie Leonhart in Attack on Titan, Kalluto Zoldyck in Hunter x Hunter, Stompp in Miraculous: Tales of Ladybug & Cat Noir).
  - Mae Whitman, American actor (voice of Katara in Avatar: The Last Airbender, Amity Blight in The Owl House, Rose/Huntsgirl in American Dragon: Jake Long, Shanti in The Jungle Book 2, Little Suzy in Johnny Bravo, Tinker Bell in the Disney Fairies franchise, April O'Neil in Teenage Mutant Ninja Turtles, Batgirl in Batman: The Brave and the Bold and DC Super Hero Girls).
- June 30: Sean Marquette, American actor (voice of Mac in Foster's Home for Imaginary Friends, Sam "The Squid" Dullard in Rocket Power, Miguel Diaz in the Batman Beyond episode "Unmasked", Little Tommy in the Megas XLR episode "DMV: Department of Megas Violations").

=== July ===
- July 11: Allegra Clark, American voice actress (voice of Maki Zen'in in Jujutsu Kaisen, Spider Demon (Mother) in Demon Slayer Kimetsu no Yaiba, Sister Ivry in Edens Zero, Princess Kakyuu in Sailor Moon, Sonia in Pokémon: Twilight Wings, Felicity in Rainbow Butterfly Unicorn Kitty).
- July 12: Christine Marie Cabanos, American actress (voice of the title characters in Squid Girl and Puella Magi Madoka Magica, Sailor Saturn in the Viz Media dub of Sailor Moon, Keiko Ayano in Sword Art Online, Maya Ibuki in the Netflix dub of Neon Genesis Evangelion, Cece Lejune in Zak Storm).
- July 15: Aimee Carrero, Dominican actress (voice of Elena in Elena of Avalor, Adora/She-Ra in She-Ra and the Princesses of Power).
- July 19: Cherami Leigh, American actress (voice of Asuna Yuuki in Sword Art Online, Lucy Heartfilia in Fairy Tail, Sailor Venus in the Viz Media dub of Sailor Moon, Maki Himekawa in Digimon Adventure tri., Kimi Todo in Fruits Basket, Regina in Glitter Force Doki Doki, Ilia Amitola in RWBY, Chloe in Pokémon Journeys: The Series, Trixx, Ella Césaire, and Etta Césaire in Miraculous: Tales of Ladybug & Cat Noir).
- July 24: Joe Pera, American comedian, writer and actor (voice of Alaquippa Ed in F is for Family, Fern in Elemental, Christopher in Bob's Burgers).
- July 25: Mamoudou Athie, Mauritanian-American actor (voice of Wade Ripple in Elemental).

=== August ===
- August 3: Brandon Rogers, American actor, comedian, filmmaker, and youtuber (Helluva Boss, Hazbin Hotel).

=== September ===
- September 5: Shion Takeuchi, American television writer (Cartoon Network Studios, Gravity Falls, Lost in Oz, Disenchantment), storyboard artist (Regular Show, Monsters University, Inside Out) and producer (creator of Inside Job).
- September 8: Shannon Chan-Kent, Canadian actress and singer (voice of Silver Spoon, Smolder, and the singing voice of Pinkie Pie in My Little Pony: Friendship is Magic, the Biskit Twins and Youngmee Song in Littlest Pet Shop, Misa Amane in Death Note, Pipsqueak in Quest for Zhu).
- September 12: Carlos López Estrada, Mexican-American filmmaker (Raya and the Last Dragon).
- September 15: Chelsea Kane, American actress and singer (voice of Bea Goldfishberg in Fish Hooks, Jen Sanders in Hot Streets, Loy in Archibald's Next Big Thing, Rose Wilson in the DC Super Hero Girls episode "#DinnerForFive", Arthricia in the Rick and Morty episode "Look Who's Purging Now", Chrissy in the Regular Show episode "Return of Party Horse", Butterbear and Ellen Ripley in the Robot Chicken episode "Musya Shakhtyorov in: Honeyboogers").
- September 29: Mario Jose, American singer (voice of Julio in The Simpsons episode "Diary Queen").

=== October ===
- October 4: Melissa Benoist, American actress (voice of Teela in Masters of the Universe: Revelation, X-23 in the Robot Chicken episode "Sundancer Craig in: 30% of the Way to Crying").
- October 21: Mark Rendall, Canadian actor (voice of Arthur Read in seasons 7 and 8 of Arthur, Russell Wright in King, Joe Arthur in Time Warp Trio, Todd in Wayside).
- October 27: Dylan Hoffman, American technical director and rigging artist (Walt Disney Animation Studios, Kamp Koral: SpongeBob's Under Years), (d. 2022).
- October 28: Edd Gould, English animator (Eddsworld), (d. 2012).

=== November ===
- November 8: Matt Braly, American animator, director, writer, and producer (Gravity Falls, Big City Greens, The Mitchells vs. the Machines, creator of and voice of Chuck and Frobo in Amphibia).
- November 22: Jamie Campbell Bower, English actor (voice of Skiff in Thomas & Friends).

=== December ===
- December 1: Zoë Kravitz, American actress and singer (voice of Mary Jane Watson in Spider-Man: Into the Spider-Verse, Catwoman in The Lego Batman Movie).
- December 8: Tru Valentino, American actor (voice of Cuphead in The Cuphead Show!, T'Challa / Black Panther in Spidey and His Amazing Friends)
- December 14: Vanessa Hudgens, American actress and singer (voice of Sunny Starscout in My Little Pony: A New Generation).
- December 31: Chris Niosi, American voice actor (voice of Ernesto in OK K.O.! Let's Be Heroes, Arataka Reigen in Mob Psycho 100, Karna in Fate/Apocrypha, Pegasus in the Viz Media dub of Sailor Moon).

== Deaths ==
=== January ===
- January 3: Patrick McGeehan, American actor (voice of the Jimmy Durante buzzard in What's Buzzin' Buzzard, Black Cat in Bad Luck Blackie, Joe Bear in Rock-a-Bye Bear), dies at age 80.
- January 7: Marilyn Schreffler, American actress (voice of Brenda Chance in Captain Caveman and the Teen Angels, Daisy Mayhem in Scooby's All-Star Laff-A-Lympics, Wendy in Yogi's Space Race and Buford and the Galloping Ghost, Olive Oyl in The All New Popeye Hour and Popeye and Son, Kuma in Pole Position, Natasha in Rose Petal Place, Winnie Werewolf in Scooby-Doo and the Ghoul School), dies at age 42.
- January 30: Homer Brightman, American screenwriter (Walt Disney Company, Walter Lantz, MGM, UPA, Larry Harmon Pictures, Cambria Productions, DePatie-Freleng Enterprises) and comic writer, dies at age 86.

=== February ===
- February 27: Gene de Paul, American pianist, composer and songwriter (Walt Disney Animation Studios), dies at age 68.

=== March ===
- March 1: Joe Besser, American actor, comedian, and musician (voice of Babu in Jeannie, Scare Bear in Yogi's Space Race and Galaxy Goof-Ups, Putty Puss in The Houndcats, Elmo in Shirt Tales, Cupid in The Smurfs), dies at age 80.
- March 8: Jan Kraan, Dutch illustrator, animator and comics artist, dies at age 87.

=== April ===
- April 1: Jim Jordan, American actor (voice of Orville in The Rescuers), dies at age 91.
- April 10: Woody Kling, American television writer (The Littles, Rainbow Brite), dies at age 62.
- April 15: Kenneth Williams, English comedian and actor (narrator and other voices in Willo the Wisp), dies from a barbiturate overdose at age 62.
- April 25: Lanny Ross, American singer and actor (singing voice of Prince David in Gulliver's Travels), dies at age 82.

=== May ===
- May 18: Daws Butler, American actor (voice of the City Wolf in Tex Avery's Little Rural Riding Hood, Mysto the Magician in Avery's Magical Maestro, Spike the Bulldog in Tom & Jerry, Chilly Willy in Walter Lantz's cartoons, Nasty Canasta in Barbary Coast Bunny, Huckleberry Hound, Yogi Bear, Snagglepuss, Hokey Wolf, Elroy Jetson in The Jetsons, Wally Gator, Quick Draw McGraw, Loopy De Loop), dies at age 71.
- May 19: Lloyd Vaughan, American animator (Warner Bros. Cartoons, DePatie-Freleng, Hanna-Barbera, Chuck Jones, Heavy Traffic, Garfield), dies at age 79.
- May 24: Tom Adair, American songwriter, composer, and screenwriter (Walt Disney Animation Studios, Babar), dies at age 74.

=== June ===
- June 22: Dennis Day, American actor, comedian and singer (narrator of the Johnny Appleseed segment in Melody Time), dies at age 72.

=== July ===
- July 22: Larry Clemmons, American animator, screenwriter, and actor (Walt Disney Animation Studios), dies at age 81.
- July 25: Judith Barsi, American child actress (voice of Ducky in The Land Before Time, Anne-Marie in All Dogs Go to Heaven), was murdered by her father at age 10.
- July 31: Phil Monroe, American animator and director (Warner Bros. Cartoons, UPA, DePatie-Freleng, MGM, Chuck Jones), dies at age 71.

=== August ===
- August 1: Red Coffey, American comedian and actor (voice of Quacker in Tom & Jerry), dies at age 65.
- August 7: Wilfred Jackson, American animator, director, composer and arranger (Walt Disney Company), dies at age 82.
- August 8: Alan Napier, English actor (voice of Sir Pellinore in The Sword in the Stone, huntsman and reporter in Mary Poppins), dies at age 85.
- August 17: Jack Cutting, American animator and film director (Walt Disney Company), dies at age 80.

=== September ===
- September 7: Vivi Janiss, American actress (voice of Daisy Duck in Donald's Diary), dies at age 77.
- September 17: Roman Davydov, Russian film director (Adventures of Mowgli), dies at age 75.
- September 20: Roy Kinnear, English actor (narrator of Bertha, voice of Pipkin in Watership Down, Bulk in SuperTed), dies from a heart attack at age 54.

=== October ===
- October 4: Zlatko Grgić, Croatian animator and animation director (Professor Balthazar, The Devil's Work), dies at age 57.
- October 25: Eric Larson, American animator (Walt Disney Company), dies at age 83.
- October 30: T. Hee, American animator and film director (Warner Bros. Cartoons, Walt Disney Company, UPA, Terrytoons), dies at age 77.

=== November ===
- November 23: Kenzō Masaoka, Japanese animator and director (the first animator to use cel animation and recorded sound in anime, Chikara to Onna no Yo no Naka, Benkei tai Ushiwaka, Kumo to Tulip, co-founder of Toei Animation), dies at age 90.
- November 27: John Carradine, American actor (voice of Tyrone T. Tattersall in Shinbone Alley, The Tramp in The Mouse and His Child, The Wizard in Aladdin and the Wonderful Lamp, The Great Owl in The Secret of NIMH), dies at age 82.

== See also ==
- 1988 in anime
