= List of animated feature films of 1987 =

This is a list of animated feature films first released in 1987.

== List ==
Title	Country	Director	Production company	Animation technique	Format	Notes	Release date	Duration
2001 Nights; 2001夜物語 (2001 Ya Monogatari)	Japan	Yoshio Takeuchi	Tokyo Movie Shinsha	Traditional	Direct-to-video; OVA		June 21, 1987	60 minutes
The Adventures of Lolo the Penguin; Приключе́ния пингвинёнка Лоло́ (Priklyucheniya pingvinyonka Lolo) 小さなペンギンロロの冒険 (Chiisana pengin Lolo no bôken)	Soviet Union; Japan	Gennady Sokolskiy; Kinjiro Yoshida	Life Work Corp; Sovinfilm; Aist Corporation; Jim Terry Productions; Soyuzmultfilm	Traditional	?	Produced from 1980 to 1986, originally released from 1986 to 1987 as a three-part serial film.	June 25, 1987	78 minutes
Aitsu to Lullaby: Suiyobi no Cinderella あいつとララバイ 水曜日のシンデレラ (That Guy and Lullaby: Cinderella's Wednesday)	Japan	Hiroyuki Yokoyama; Motosuke Takahashi	Kodansha; Pierrot	Traditional	Theatrical		August 1, 1987	52 minutes
Alice Through the Looking Glass	Australia; United States	Andrea Bresciani; Richard Slapczynski	Burbank Films Australia; Jambre Productions	Traditional	Television film		May 15, 1987	73 minutes
An All New Adventure of Disney's Sport Goofy	United States	John Klawitter	Walt Disney Productions (archive footage); Happyfeets Co. Walt Disney Television	Traditional	Television special Compilation film	Compilation of Disney theatrical animated shorts themed to sports; narrated by Stan Freberg.	May 27, 1987	47 minutes
The Amazing Mr. Bickford	United States	Bruce Bickford; Frank Zappa	?	Stop motion	Direct-to-video		?	52 minutes
Las Aventuras de Oliver Twist El Pequeño Ladronzuelo	Mexico	Fernando Ruiz	Mundo Animado	Traditional	?		?	91 minutes
Baribari Densetsu バリバリ伝説 (Vroom Vroom Legend)	Japan	Nagayuki Toriumi; Satoshi Uemura	Kodansha; Pierrot	Traditional	Theatrical; Compilation film	Originally released as a 2-part OVA in 1986.	August 1, 1987	85 minutes
Bats & Terry バツ&テリー (Batsu & Teri)	Japan	Nobuo Mizuta	Sunrise	Traditional	Theatrical		March 14, 1987	80 minutes
Battle Royal High School 真魔人伝 バトルロイヤルハイスクール (Shin Majin Den Batoru Roiyaru Haisukūru)	Japan	Ichirō Itano	Tokuma Shoten	Traditional	Direct-to-video; OVA		December 10, 1987	60 minutes
The Big Bang; Le Big Bang	France; Belgium	Picha	Stout Studio	Traditional	Theatrical		March 18, 1987	80 minutes
Black Beauty	Australia	David Cherkasskiy	Burbank Films Australia	Traditional	Television film		June 19, 1987	50 minutes
Black Magic M-66 ブラックマジック マリオシックスティシックス (Burakku Majikku Mario Shikkusuti Shikkusu)	Japan	Hiroyuki Kitakubo; Masamune Shirow	AIC; Animate	Traditional	Direct-to-video; OVA		June 28, 1987	48 minutes
The Brave Little Toaster	United States; United Kingdom	Jerry Rees	Hyperion Animation Company, Inc. The Kushner-Locke Company; Wang Film Productions ITC Entertainment Walt Disney Pictures	Traditional	Theatrical	Distributed by Disney Channel in the USA.	June 19, 1987	90 minutes
Bug tte Honey: Megaromu Shōjo Ma 4622; Bugってハニー メガロム少女舞4622 (Bug is Honey: Megarom Girl Dance 4622)	Japan	Akinori Nagaoka	Hudson; Hudson Movie Production; Tokyo Movie Shinsha	Traditional	Theatrical		July 21, 1987	48 minutes
Bunna, Come Down from the Tree ブンナよ、木からおりてこい (Bunna yo, Ki kara Orite Koi)	Japan	Yuji Tanno	Dax International, Inc.	Traditional	Theatrical	Based on the 1972 book of the same title by Tsutomu Mizukami.	March 21, 1987	52 minutes
The Care Bears Adventure in Wonderland	Canada	Raymond Jafelice	Cineplex Odeon Films (distributor); Nelvana Limited	Traditional	Theatrical	Third film installment in the Care Bears franchise and a crossover adaptation of Lewis Carroll's Alice's Adventures in Wonderland (1865) and Through the Looking-Glass (1871).	August 7, 1987	78 minutes
The Chipmunk Adventure	United States	Janice Karman	The Samuel Goldwyn Company (distributor); Bagdasarian Productions	Traditional	Theatrical		May 22, 1987	78 minutes
Circuit Angel: Resolving Starting Grid サーキットエンジェル 決意のスターティング・グリット (Circuit Angel: Ketsui no Starting Grid)	Japan	Yoshikazu Tochihira	Hiro Media; Studio Unicorn	Traditional	Direct-to-video; OVA		May 21, 1987	45 minutes
Crystal Triangle 禁断の黙示録 クリスタル・トライアングル (Kindan no Mokushiroku Crystal Triangle)	Japan	Seiji Okuda	Studio Live	Traditional	Direct-to-video; OVA		July 1, 1987	86 minutes
Daimajū Gekitō: Hagane no Oni 大魔獣激闘 鋼の鬼 (Demon of Steel: Battle of the Great Demon Beasts)	Japan	Toshihiro Hirano	AIC; Tokuma Japan Communications	Traditional	Direct-to-video; OVA		December 10, 1987	60 minutes
Devilman: The Birth デビルマン 誕生編 (Devilman: Tanjou-hen)	Japan	Tsutomu Iida	Oh! Production	Traditional	Direct-to-video; OVA		November 1, 1987	60 minutes
Digital Devil Story: Megami Tensei デジタル・デビル物語 女神転生 (Dejitaru Debiru Sutōrī: Megami Tensei)	Japan	Mizuho Nishikubo	Animate; MOVIC; Tokuma Japan; Tokuma Shoten	Traditional	Direct-to-video; OVA		March 25, 1987	45 minutes
Don Quixote of La Mancha	Australia	?	Burbank Films Australia	Traditional	Television film		January 1, 1987	55 minutes
Doraemon: Nobita and the Knights on Dinosaurs ドラえもん のび太と竜の騎士 (Doraemon: Nobita to Ryū no Kishi)	Japan	Tsutomu Shibayama	Toho; Shin-Ei Animation; Asatsu DK	Traditional	Theatrical		March 14, 1987	91 minutes
Dot and the Smugglers a. k. a. Dot and the Bunyip	Australia	Yoram Gross	Yoram Gross Studios	Traditional	Theatrical		April 4, 1987	75 minutes
Dot Goes to Hollywood a. k. a. Dot in Concert	Australia	Yoram Gross	Yoram Gross Studios	Traditional	Theatrical		July 9, 1987	73 minutes
Down and Out with Donald Duck	United States	Scott Garen	Walt Disney Productions (archive footage); Garen/Albrecht Productions Inc. Walt Disney Television	Traditional	Television special Compilation film	Compilation of Disney theatrical animated shorts with newly redubbed voices; narrated by Stan Freberg.	March 25, 1987	60 minutes
Dragon Ball: Sleeping Princess in Devil's Castle ドラゴンボール 魔神城のねむり姫 (Doragon Bōru Majin-jō no nemuri hime)	Japan	Daisuke Nishio	Toei Animation	Traditional	Theatrical		July 18, 1987	45 minutes
Dreaming of Paradise a. k. a. Subway to Paradise; Strit og Stumme	Denmark	Jannik Hastrup	Dansk Tegnefilm	Traditional	?		November 20, 1987	78 minutes
DuckTales: The Treasure of the Golden Suns	United States	Alan Zaslove	Walt Disney Television; Walt Disney Television Animation; Buena Vista Television (distributor)	Traditional	Television film	Pilot of the Disney television series DuckTales (1987–1990).	September 18, 1987	97 minutes
The Emerald City of Oz	Canada	Tim Reid	Cinar; Lightyear Entertainment; Panmedia	Traditional	Direct-to-video; Compilation film	Compilation film of episodes 42 to 52 from the animated television series The Wonderful Wizard of Oz.	?	94 minutes
The Flying Luna Clipper	Japan	Ikko Ono	Sony Video Software International	Computer	Direct-to-video	The film was wholly animated through 8-bit MSX computer systems.	November 1987	55 minutes
The Foxes of Chironup Island チロヌップのきつね (Chironuppu no Kitsune)	Japan	Tetsuo Imazawa	Nippon Herald Films (distributor); Group TAC	Traditional	Theatrical		August 15, 1987	72 minutes
Fujiko Fujio no Kiteretsu Daihyakka 藤子不二雄のキテレツ大百科 (Fujiko Fujio's Kiteretsu Large Encyclopedia)	Japan	Keiji Hayakawa; Takashi Watanabe	Nihon Ad Systems; Staff 21; Fuji TV (distributor)	Traditional	Television special	Pilot of the animated television series Kiteretsu Daihyakka, based on the manga of the same title by Fujiko F. Fujio, that ran from March 27, 1988, to June 9, 1996, for a total of 331 episodes.	November 2, 1987	90 minutes
Gall Force 2: Destruction ガルフォース2 ディストラクション	Japan	Katsuhito Akiyama	Artmic; AIC	Traditional	Direct-to-video; OVA		November 21, 1987	45 minutes
Gandahar; Gandahar: Les Années-lumière	France	René Laloux	SEK Studio	Traditional	Theatrical		December 11, 1987	82 minutes
G.I. Joe: The Movie	United States	Don Jurwich	Hasbro; Sunbow Productions; Marvel Productions; Toei Animation	Traditional	Direct-to-video		April 20, 1987	93 minutes
The Gnomes' Great Adventure; La Gran Aventura de los Gnomos	United States; Spain	Harvey Weinstein	BRB International; Miramax (distributor)	Traditional	Television film		July 1987	55 minutes
God Bless Dancouga 超獣機神ダンクーガ (Chōjū Kishin Dankūga)	Japan	Seiji Okuda	Ashi Productions	Traditional	Direct-to-video; OVA		April 15, 1987	80 minutes
Good Morning Althea グッドモーニング アルテア	Japan	Hideki Tonokatsu	Animate Film; Anime R Office Next-One; Studio Bogey	Traditional	Direct-to-video; OVA		December 16, 1987	52 minutes
Gréti...! Gréti...! (Egy kutya feljegyzései) (Gréti...! (notes from a dog))	Hungary	József Nepp	Pannónia Filmstúdió	Traditional	Television film		May 2–3, 1987	76 minutes
Grimm Douwa: Kin no Tori グリム童話 金の鳥 (Grimm Fairy Tale: The Golden Bird)	Japan	Toshio Hirata	Toei Animation	Traditional	Theatrical		March 14, 1987	52 minutes
Hana no Asuka-gumi! Shin Kabukichō Story 花のあすか組！ 新歌舞伎町ストーリー (The Glorious Asuka Gang! New Kabukichō Story)	Japan	Atsutoshi Umezawa	Toei Animation	Traditional	Direct-to-video; OVA		June 10, 1987	48 minutes
Hatschipuh	German	Ulrich König	Mutoskop Film; M+P Film; Robert van Ackeren Filmproduktion; Maran Film; Süddeutscher Rundfunk; Tivoli (distributor)	Traditional/Live action	Theatrical; Live-action animated film		?	95 minutes
Hell Target ヘル・ターゲット (Heru Tāgetto)	Japan	Keito Nakamura	Nakamura Production; Studio Nue; Victor Entertainment	Traditional	Direct-to-video; OVA		January 21, 1987	50 minutes
Hoero! Bun Bun ほえろブンブン (Bark! Bun Bun)	Japan	Toshio Hirata	Madhouse, Inc. Magic Capsule; Miyagi Festival Film Center (distributor)	Traditional	Theatrical		April 4, 1987	65 minutes
Ico, el caballito valiente	Argentina	Manuel García Ferré		Traditional			July 9, 1987	67 minutes
The Jetsons Meet the Flintstones	United States	Don Lusk	Hanna-Barbera	Traditional	Television film	Third installment in the syndicated anthology film series Hanna-Barbera Superstars 10.	November 15, 1987	92 minutes
Junk Boy ジャンクボーイ (Janku Bōi)	Japan	Katsuhisa Yamada	Madhouse, Inc. Victor Entertainment	Traditional	Direct-to-video; OVA		December 16, 1987	60 minutes
Kaze to Ki no Uta SANCTUS -Sei naru kana- 風と木の詩 SANCTUS -聖なるかな- (The Poem of Wind and Trees: Sanctus -Is It Holy?-)	Japan	Yoshikazu Yasuhiko	Triangle Staff	Traditional	Direct-to-video; OVA		November 6, 1987	60 minutes
The Last of the Mohicans	Australia	?	Burbank Films Australia	Traditional	Television film		July 31, 1987	55 minutes
Laughing Target 笑う標的 (Warau Hyōteki)	Japan	Motosuke Takahashi	Studio Pierrot	Traditional	Direct-to-video; OVA		March 21, 1987	47 minutes
Laughter and Grief by the White Sea; Смех и горе у Бела моря (Smeh i gore u Bela morya)	Soviet Union	Leonid Nosyrev	Soyuzmultfilm	Traditional	?		?	59 minutes
The Legend of Kentauros ケンタウロスの伝説 (Kentauros no Densetsu)	Japan	Katsuhisa Yamada	MC (Motorcycle Club) Centaur Boss; Wako Pro	Traditional	Direct-to-video; OVA		December 21, 1987	95 minutes
Leo and Fred; Leó és Fred, avagy igaz történetek két jó barátról	Hungary	Pál Tóth	Pannónia Filmstúdió; Magyar Televízió	Traditional	?		?	66 minutes
Lily C.A.T. リリィ・キャット (LILY-C.A.T.)	Japan	Hisayuki Toriumi	Studio Pierrot	Traditional	Direct-to-video; OVA		September 1, 1987	91 minutes
The Little Troll Prince	United States	Ray Patterson	Hanna-Barbera	Traditional	Television special		November 27, 1987	46 minutes
Long Live Servatius! Éljen Szervác!	Hungary	Ottó Foky	Pannónia Filmstúdió	Stop motion	?		May 21, 1987	63 minutes
Lupin III: The Fuma Conspiracy ルパン三世 風魔一族の陰謀 (Rupan Sansei: Fūma Ichizoku no Inbō)	Japan	Masayuki Ōzeki	Toho; Tokyo Movie Shinsha	Traditional	Theatrical; Direct-to-video; OVA	First OVA installment in the Lupin III manga and anime series; the film was given a limited theatrical release before its intended home video debut four months later on April 5, 1988.	December 26, 1987 (Theatrical), April 5, 1988 (Direct-to-video)	73 minutes
Makyō Gaiden Le Deus 魔境外伝レディウス (Demon Frontier Legend Le Deus)	Japan	Hiroshi Negishi	Toho (distributor); Ashi Productions	Traditional	Direct-to-video; OVA		December 1, 1987	48 minutes
Maps: Legendary Space Wanderers マップス 伝説のさまよえる星人たち (Maps: Densetsu no Samayoeru Seijintachi)	Japan	Keiji Hayakawa	Nippon Columbia; Shochiku-Fuji Ltd. (distributor); Studio Gallop; Columbia Music Entertainment	Traditional	Direct-to-video; OVA		July 21, 1987	51 minutes
Margo the Mouse; Przygody Myszki	Poland	Eugeniusz Kotowski	Studio Filmów Rysunkowych; Film Polski (distributor)	Traditional	Theatrical; Compilation film		November 20, 1987	78 minutes
The Marvelous Land of Oz	Canada	Tim Reid	Cinar; Panmedia	Traditional	Direct-to-video; Compilation film	Compilation film of episodes 18 to 30 from the animated television series The Wonderful Wizard of Oz.	?	91 minutes
Meet Julie	United States	Walt Kubiak	DiC Entertainment; Worlds of Wonder (distributor)	Traditional	Television special		?	44 minutes
Metal Skin Panic MADOX-01 メタルスキンパニック MADOX-01 (Metaru Sukin Panikku Madokkusu Zero Wan)	Japan	Shinji Aramaki	Pony Canyon; Soeishinsha	Traditional	Direct-to-video; OVA		December 16, 1987	45 minutes
Milk House Dreaming: The Four Seasons of Love ミルクハウス・ドリーミング 愛の四季 (Milk House Dreaming: Ai no Shiki)	Japan	Yuuyuki Torii; Yumiko Kawahara (animation director)	Shogakukan-Shueisha Productions; Bandai Visual (distributor); Mook Animation	Traditional	Direct-to-video; OVA		November 28, 1987	43 minutes
Minna Agechau みんなあげちゃう (I Give My All)	Japan	Osamu Uemura; Yoshihide Kuriyama	Young Jump Video; J.C.Staff; Sony Music Entertainment Japan (distributor); Shueisha (distributor)	Traditional	Direct-to-video; OVA		March 27, 1987	45 minutes
Monica and the Mermaid of the River; Mônica e a Sereia do Rio	Brazil	Mauricio de Sousa; Walter Hugo Khouri	Estúdios Maurício de Sousa; Black & White & Color Produções; Embrafilme (distributor)	Traditional	Theatrical; Compilation film		February 7, 1987	56 minutes
Monica's Gang in: The Boogeyman; Turma da Mônica em: O Bicho-Papão	Brazil	Mauricio de Sousa	Estúdios Maurício de Sousa	Traditional	Theatrical; Compilation film		July 16, 1987	60 minutes
Mugen Shinshi: Bōken Katsugeki Hen 夢幻紳士 ～冒険活劇編～ (Mugen Shinshi: Dream Dimension Gentleman)	Japan	Hatsuki Tsuji	Victor Entertainment; Gallop	Traditional	Direct-to-video; OVA		February 21, 1987	49 minutes
My Favourite Time; Любимое моё время (Lyubimoye moyo vremya)	Soviet Union	Andrei Khrzhanovsky	Soyuzmultfilm	Traditional; Cutout	?		?	80 minutes
Neo Tokyo 迷宮物語 (Meikyū Monogatari)	Japan	Rintaro; Yoshiaki Kawajiri; Katsuhiro Ōtomo	Toho (distributor); Madhouse, Inc. Project Team Argos	Traditional	Theatrical; Anthology film		September 25, 1987	50 minutes
The Odyssey	Australia	?	Burbank Films Australia	Traditional	Television film		November 19, 1987	55 minutes
Ozma of Oz	Canada	Tim Reid	Cinar; Panmedia	Traditional	Direct-to-video	Compilation film of episodes 31 to 41 from the animated television series The Wonderful Wizard of Oz.	?	96 minutes
Persia, the Magic Fairy: Merry-go-round 魔法の妖精ペルシャ 回転木馬 (Mahou no Yousei Persia: Kaiten Mokuba)	Japan	?	Pierrot	Traditional	Direct-to-video; OVA	A recap of the TV series with six and a half minutes of new footage.	September 25, 1987	45 minutes
Phoenix: Space Chapter 火の鳥・宇宙編 (Hi no Tori: Uchuu-hen)	Japan	Yoshiaki Kawajiri	Madhouse, Inc. Tezuka Productions	Traditional	Direct-to-video; OVA		December 21, 1987	48 minutes
Phoenix: Yamato Chapter 火の鳥・ヤマト編 (Hi no Tori: Yamato-hen)	Japan	Toshio Hirata	Madhouse, Inc. Tezuka Productions	Traditional	Direct-to-video; OVA		August 1, 1987	48 minutes
Pinocchio and the Emperor of the Night	United States	Hal Sutherland	New World Pictures (distributor); Filmation	Traditional	Theatrical		December 25, 1987	87 minutes
Project A-ko 2: Plot of the Daitokuji Financial Group プロジェクトA子2 大徳寺財閥の陰謀 (Project A-ko 2: Daitokuji Zaibatsu no Inbou)	Japan	Yuji Moriyama	Pony Canyon; Soeishinsha; A.P.P.P.	Traditional	Direct-to-video; OVA		May 21, 1987	70 minutes
The Puppetoon Movie	United States	Arnold Leibovit	Expanded Entertainment; Arnold Leibovit Entertainment	Stop motion	Theatrical; Compilation film		June 12, 1987	79 minutes
Relic Armor Legaciam レリック・アーマー レガシアム (Rerikku Āmā Regashiamu)	Japan	Hiroyuki Kitazume	Movic Co. Ltd. Kadokawa Shoten; AIC; A.P.P.P. Ashi Productions; West Cape Productions; Bandai Visual	Traditional	Direct-to-video; OVA		November 28, 1987	50 minutes
Rob Roy	Australia	?	Burbank Films Australia	Traditional	Television film		July 5, 1987	48 minutes
Robot Carnival ロボット・カーニバル (Robotto Kānibaru)	Japan	Atsuko Fukushima; Katsuhiro Otomo; Kōji Morimoto; Hidetoshi Omori; Yasuomi Umetsu; Hiroyuki Kitazume; Mao Lamdo; Hiroyuki Kitakubo; Takashi Nakamura	A.P.P.P.	Traditional	Direct-to-video; OVA; Anthology film		July 21, 1987	91 minutes
Robotix: The Movie	United States; Canada	Wally Burr	Sunbow Productions; Marvel Productions; Toei Animation	Traditional	Direct-to-video; Compilation film	Compilation film of the 15-episode animated television miniseries ran in 1985–86, as part of the series Super Sunday that ran from October 6, 1985 to January 12, 1986.	?	90 minutes
Rock Odyssey	United States	Joseph Barbera; William Hanna; Robert Taylor (uncredited)	Hanna-Barbera	Traditional	?		July 13, 1987	120 minutes
The Rose of Versailles: I'll Love You As Long As I Live ベルサイユのばら 生命あるかぎり愛して (Versailles no Bara: Seimei Aru Kagiri Aishite)	Japan	Kenji Kodama; Yoshio Takeuchi	Tokyo Movie Shinsha	Traditional	Theatrical; Direct-to-video; OVA	Extension of the animated television series The Rose of Versailles#Anime that ran from October 10, 1979 to September 3, 1980 for a total of 40 episodes.	May 21, 1987 (Direct-to-video), May 19, 1990 (Theatrical)	90 minutes
Royal Space Force: The Wings of Honneamise 王立宇宙軍 オネアミスの翼 (Ōritsu Uchūgun: Oneamisu no Tsubasa)	Japan	Hiroyuki Yamaga	Toho Towa; Gainax; Bandai Visual	Traditional	Theatrical	Debut work of anime studio Gainax.	March 14, 1987	119 minutes
Rusinoita	Finland	Hannu Peltomaa; Marjatta Rinne	Suomi-Filmi; Elovalkia; Työryhmä Rusina	?	Theatrical		February 21, 1987	52 minutes
Saint Seiya: The Movie 聖闘士星矢 邪神エリス (Seinto Seiya: Jashin Erisu)	Japan	Kōzō Morishita	Toei Animation	Traditional	Theatrical		July 18, 1987	45 minutes
The Samurai ザ・サムライ (Za samurai)	Japan	Kazuo Yamazaki	CBS/Sony Group, Inc. Suna Kobo; Tokyo Broadcasting System; Ginga Teikoku	Traditional	Direct-to-video; OVA		November 1, 1987	45 minutes
Scooby-Doo Meets the Boo Brothers	United States	Paul Sommer; Carl Urbano	Hanna-Barbera	Traditional	Television film	Second installment in the syndicated anthology film series Hanna-Barbera Superstars 10.	October 18, 1987	92 minutes
Scoopers スクーパーズ (Sukupazu)	Japan	Hideo Watanabe; Jun Hirabayashi	Victor Entertainment; ACC Production Studio	Traditional	Direct-to-video; OVA		December 1, 1987	58 minutes
Shōri Tōshu 勝利投手 (Winning Pitcher)	Japan	Hiroki Shibata	Toei Animation	Traditional	Theatrical		October 24, 1987	72 minutes
The Snow Queen; Sněhová královna	Czechoslovakia	Ladislav Čapek	Krátký film Praha; Studio Jiří Trnka	?	Theatrical		?	51 minutes
SOS from the Earth; SOSこちら地球 (SOS kochira chikyû)	Japan	Akikazu Kôno	Joint Film National Series Conference	Stop motion	Theatrical		June 27, 1987	68 minutes
Sparky's Magic Piano	United States	Lee Mishkin	SMP Associates; Pacific Rim Productions (animation)	Traditional	Direct-to-video		July 26, 1987	48 minutes
The Story of Fifteen Boys 瞳のなかの少年 十五少年漂流記 (Hitomi no Naka no Shounen: Juugo Shounen Hyouryuuki)	Japan	Masao Kuroda	Nippon Animation	Traditional	Television film		October 19, 1987	84 minutes
Take the X Train; X電車でいこう (X Densha de Ikō)	Japan	Rintaro	Konami (distributor); Madhouse, Inc.	Traditional	Direct-to-video; OVA		November 6, 1987	50 minutes
The Tale of Genji 源氏物語 (Murasaki Shikibu: Genji Monogatari)	Japan	Gisaburo Sugii	Asahi Shimbun; Group TAC	Traditional	Theatrical		December 19, 1987	106 minutes
Touch 3: Long After You've Passed Me By タッチ3 君が通り過ぎたあとに -DON'T PASS ME BY- (Tatchi 3: Kimi ga Toori Sugita Ato ni -Don't Pass Me By-)	Japan	Gisaburō Sugii (chief); Akinori Nagaoka; Naoto Hashimoto (cooperation)	Group TAC	Traditional	Theatrical	Film compiled from TV series episodes	April 11, 1987	83 minutes
To-y トーイ (TO-Y)	Japan	Mamoru Hamatsu	Shogakukan-Shueisha Productions; CBS; Sony; Gallop	Traditional	Direct-to-video; OVA		October 1, 1987	55 minutes
Treasure Island 宝島 (Takarajima)	Japan	Yoshio Takeuchi; Osamu Dezaki	Tokyo Movie Shinsha; Madhouse	Traditional	Theatrical	Film compiled from TV series episodes	May 9, 1987	88 minutes
Treasure Island	Australia	Warwick Gilbert	Burbank Films Australia	Traditional	Television film		December 25, 1987	50 minutes
TWD Express: Rolling Takeoff; TWD EXPRESS ローリングテイクオフ	Japan	Kunihiko Yuyama	Gallop; Gakken; Shochiku-Fuji Ltd. (distributor)	Traditional	Direct-to-video; OVA		July 21, 1987	55 minutes
Twilight of the Cockroaches ゴキブリたちの黄昏 (Gokiburi-tachi no Tasogare)	Japan	Hiroaki Yoshida	Madhouse, Inc. Kitty Films	Traditional/Live action	Theatrical		November 21, 1987	105 minutes
Ultraman: The Adventure Begins a. k. a. Ultraman USA ウルトラマンUSA (Urutoraman Yū Esu Ē)	United States; Japan	Mitsuo Kusakabe; Ray Patterson (supervising)	Hanna-Barbera Productions; Tsuburaya Productions; Studio Sign; Ashi Productions	Traditional	Theatrical		October 12, 1987 (United States), April 28, 1989 (Japan)	75 minutes
Urusei Yatsura: Inaba the Dreammaker うる星やつら'87 夢の仕掛人、因幡くん登場! ラムの未来はどうなるっちゃ!? (Yume no Shikakenin, Inaba-kun Tōjō! Ramu no Mirai wa Dōnaruccha!?)	Japan	Tetsu Dezaki	Magic Bus	Traditional	Television special	Fourth and final Urusei Yatsura special; released sixteen months after the end of the respective television series.	July 18, 1987	57 minutes
The Wandering Magpie 떠돌이 까치 (Tteodori Kkachi )	South Korea	Jo Bong-nam	Shinwon Pro Co., Ltd. Daewon Donghwa; Seyoung Donghwa; Korean Broadcasting System (distributor)	Traditional	Television film	First Korean animated feature film made for television overall.	May 5, 1987	84 minutes
Wicked City 妖獣都市 (Yōjū Toshi)	Japan	Yoshiaki Kawajiri	Madhouse, Inc.	Traditional	Direct-to-video; OVA	Solo directorial debut of Yoshiaki Kawajiri.	April 25, 1987	80 minutes
The Wind in the Willows	United States; Taiwan	Arthur Rankin Jr. Jules Bass	Rankin/Bass; Cuckoo's Nest Studios	Traditional	Television film	The production was completed in 1983, but the film's premiere was delayed several times before the film itself was finally broadcast in 1987 that Sunday on ABC.	July 5, 1987	96 minutes
Winter in Moominvalley; Zima w Dolinie Muminków; Winter im Tal der Muminken	Poland; German	Lucjan Dembinski; Krystyna Kulczycka; Dariusz Zawilski; Jadwiga Kudrzycka	Se-ma-for; Film Polski (distributor)	Stop motion	Theatrical; Compilation film	Compilation film of the Polish animated television series Opowiadania Muminków that ran from 1977 and 1982 for a total of 100 episodes.	August 1987	60 minutes
The Wonderful Wizard of Oz	Canada	Tim Reid	Cinar; Walker Co. Panmedia	Traditional	Direct-to-video; Compilation film	Compilation film of episodes 1 to 17 from the animated television series The Wonderful Wizard of Oz that ran from October 6, 1986 to September 28, 1987 for a total of 52 episodes.	December 31, 1987	93 minutes
Yogi's Great Escape	United States	Neal Barbera	Hanna-Barbera	Traditional	Television film	First installment in the syndicated anthology film series Hanna-Barbera Superstars 10.	September 20, 1987	93 minutes
Yogi Bear and the Magical Flight of the Spruce Goose	United States	Ray Patterson; Arthur Davis; Oscar Dufau; John Kimball; Jay Sarbry; Paul Sommer; Rudy Zamora	Hanna-Barbera	Traditional	Television film	Fourth installment in the syndicated anthology film series Hanna-Barbera Superstars 10.	November 22, 1987	92 minutes

== Highest-grossing animated films ==
The following is a list of the 5 highest-grossing animated feature films first released in 1987.

Rank	Title	Studio	Worldwide gross	Ref.
1	Doraemon: Nobita and the Knights on Dinosaurs	Asatsu / Toho	$17,630,000 (¥2,550,000,000)	
2	The Chipmunk Adventure	Bagdasarian Productions	$6,804,312	
3	The Care Bears Adventure in Wonderland	Nelvana Limited	$6,000,000	
4	Dragon Ball: Sleeping Princess in Devil's Castle	Toei Animation	$5,670,000 (¥850 million)	
5	Royal Space Force: The Wings of Honneamise	Gainax / Bandai Visual	$5,220,485 (¥800 million)	
6	The Brave Little Toaster	Hyperion Animation Company, Inc. / The Kushner-Locke Company	$2,300,000	

== See also ==
- List of animated television series of 1987
