= List of Kimagure Orange Road soundtracks =

Japanese anime soundtrack discography

This is a list of CDs released for the anime series Kimagure Orange Road.

== Sound Color ==
Kimagure Orange Road – Sound Color 1

Soundtrack album
- Released: June 20, 1986
- Genre: Japanese Anime Pop
- Length: 38:02
- Label: Futureland

Serial No – LD32-5049

No.	Title	Writer(s)	Notes	Length
1.	"Night of Summer Side" (Vocals: Ikeda Masanori)	Lyrics: Masao Urino; Music: Nobody; Arrangement: Shinkawa Hiroshi	Opening theme 1	4:09
2.	"Red Straw Hat (赤い麦わら帽子, Akai mugiwara boushi)"	Music: Sagisu Shirou; Arrangement: Sagisu Shirou		2:45
3.	"ESP and the T.P.O. (Time-Place-Occasion)" ("E.S.P ni mo T.P.O")	Music: Sagisu Shirou; Arrangement: Sagisu Shirou		1:04
4.	"Blue Sky Blastoff! (青空をぶっとばせ!, Aozora o buttobase!)"	Music: Sagisu Shirou; Arrangement: Sagisu Shirou		1:33
5.	"Madoka's Theme ~ Lonely Concert (まどかのテーマ 〜ひとりぼっちのConcert, Madoka no TE-MA ~ hitoribocchi no Concert)"	Music: Sagisu Shirou; Arrangement: Sagisu Shirou		2:27
6.	"Walk Struttin'"	Music: Sagisu Shirou; Arrangement: Sagisu Shirou		2:10
7.	"Dangerous Triangle (危険なトライアングル, Kiken-na TORAIANGURU)" (Vocals: Ikeda Masanori)	Lyrics: Urino Masao; Music: Izumi Tsunehiro; Arrangement: Shinkawa Hiroshi	Insert song: Episode 11	4:15
8.	"Summer Mirage (夏のミラージュ, natsu no MIRA-JU)" (Vocals: Wada Kanako)	Lyrics: Yukawa Reiko; Music: Tsukasa; Arrangement: Sagisu Shirou	Ending theme 1	4:30
9.	"Questions in Secret (疑問符はナイショで, Gimonfu wa NAISHO de)"	Music: Sagisu Shirou; Arrangement: Sagisu Shirou		1:52
10.	"Aerobics on 'RAP'"	Music: Sagisu Shirou; Arrangement: Sagisu Shirou		1:52
11.	"Rock 'n' Roll Diabolic"	Music: Sagisu Shirou; Arrangement: Sagisu Shirou		1:54
12.	"Exclamation's Trickery (Exclamationの悪だくみ, Exclamation no warudakumi)"	Music: Sagisu Shirou; Arrangement: Sagisu Shirou		0:29
13.	"Honky-Tonk Hip Hop to Us (ホンキートンクHip Hop to Us, HONKI-TONKU Hip Hop to Us)" ([HIPOPOTAMUSU])	Music: Sagisu Shirou; Arrangement: Sagisu Shirou		1:40
14.	"Bayshore Dancing Way (湾岸Dancing Way, Wangan Dancing Way)"	Music: Sagisu Shirou; Arrangement: Sagisu Shirou		2:38
15.	"Janina (ジェニーナ, JENI-NA)" (Vocals: Wada Kanako)	Lyrics: Yukawa Reiko; Music: Sagisu Shirou; Arrangement: Sagisu Shirou	Insert song: Episode 12	4:38

Bonus tracks (1999 rerelease)
No.	Title	Notes	Length
16.	"Summer Mirage (Karaoke Version)" (natsu no MIRA-JU (夏のミラージュ(カラオケ)))	Ending theme 1	4:??
17.	"Janina (Karaoke Version) (ジェニーナ(カラオケ), JENI-NA)"	Insert song: Episode 12	4:??

== Sound Color 2 ==
Kimagure Orange Road – Sound Color 2

Soundtrack album
- Released: October 26, 1987
- Genre: Japanese Anime Pop
- Length: 46:10
- Label: Futureland

Serial No – LD32-5056

No.	Title	Writer(s)	Notes	Length
1.	"Orange Mystery (オレンジ・ミステリー, ORENJI MISUTERII)" (Vocals: Nagashima Hideyuki)	Lyrics: Masao Urino; Music: Nobody; Arrangement: Sagisu Shirou	Opening theme 2	3:55
2.	"Night Fog's Tiptoeing (夜霧の忍び足, Yogiri no shinobi-ashi)"	Music: Sagisu Shirou; Arrangement: Sagisu Shirou		1:39
3.	"FUTARI-DE"	Music: Sagisu Shirou; Arrangement: Sagisu Shirou		3:05
4.	"Like a Salvia Flower (サルビアの花のように, SARUBIA no hana no you ni)" (Vocals: Wada Kanako)	Lyrics: Yukawa Reiko; Music: Oda Yuuichirou; Arrangement: Irie Jun	Insert song: Episode 22	3:58
5.	"Moment Suspense (瞬間サスペンス, Shunkan SASUPENSU)"	Music: Sagisu Shirou; Arrangement: Sagisu Shirou		1:02
6.	"Madoka's Theme ~ in Blue (まどかのテーマ 〜in blue, Madoka no TE-MA ~ in blue)"	Music: Sagisu Shirou; Arrangement: Sagisu Shirou		1:16
7.	"Heavy and Severe"	Music: Sagisu Shirou; Arrangement: Sagisu Shirou		2:00
8.	"Eye Catch!"	Music: Sagisu Shirou; Arrangement: Sagisu Shirou		0:06
9.	"Look Back My Darling (ふり向いてマイ・ダーリン, Furimuite MAI DAARIN)" (Vocals: Fujishiro Minako)	Lyrics: Sawachi Takashi; Music: Sagisu Shirou; Arrangement: Sagisu Shirou	Insert song: Episode 24	3:56
10.	"Again" (Vocals: Fujishiro Minako)	Lyrics: Sawachi Takashi; Music: Sagisu Shirou; Arrangement: Sagisu Shirou		3:51
11.	"A Boy Meets a Girl"	Music: Sagisu Shirou; Arrangement: Sagisu Shirou		4:03
12.	"Breaking Heart (ブレイキングハート, BUREIKINGU HAATO)" (Vocals: Tsubokura Yuiko)	Lyrics: Show; Music: Sagisu Shirou; Arrangement: Sagisu Shirou	Insert song: Episode 13	4:02
13.	"You and Island Cafe (君とIsland cafe, Kimi to Island cafe)"	Music: Sagisu Shirou; Arrangement: Sagisu Shirou		3:15
14.	"The Dramatic Square"	Music: Sagisu Shirou; Arrangement: Sagisu Shirou		2:25
15.	"Back to the Red Straw Hat Time"	Music: Sagisu Shirou; Arrangement: Sagisu Shirou		3:27
16.	"Sad Heart Is Burning (悲しいハートは燃えている, kanashii HAATO wa moete-iru)" (Vocals: Wada Kanako)	Lyrics: Matsumoto Kazuki; Music: Inoue Daisuke; Arrangement: Shinkawa Hiroshi	Ending theme 2	4:04

Bonus tracks (1999 rerelease)
No.	Title	Notes	Length
17.	"Orange Mystery (Karaoke Version)" (ORENJI MISUTERII (オレンジ・ミステリー(カラオケ)))	Opening theme 2	3:??
18.	"Like a Salvia Flower (Karaoke Version)" (SARUBIA no hana no you ni (サルビアの花のように(カラオケ)))	Insert song: Episode 22	3:??

== Sound Color 3 ==
Kimagure Orange Road – Sound Colour 3

Soundtrack album
- Released: February 25, 1988
- Genre: Japanese Anime Pop
- Length: 46:52
- Label: Futureland

Serial No – LD32-5067

No.	Title	Writer(s)	Notes	Length
1.	"Dance in the Memories (ダンス・イン・ザ・メモリーズ)" (Vocals: Nakahara Meiko)	Lyrics: Nakahara Meiko; Music: Nakahara Meiko; Arrangement: Nishihira Akira	Ending theme 3	4:09
2.	"Reminiscence... of You in the Red Straw Hat (追憶...赤い麦わら帽子の君へ, Tsuisou... akai mugiwara boushi no kimi e)"	Music: Sagisu Shirou; Arrangement: Sagisu Shirou		3:11
3.	"After Heartbreak"	Music: Sagisu Shirou; Arrangement: Sagisu Shirou		1:52
4.	"Fly Me to the Ski"	Music: Sagisu Shirou; Arrangement: Sagisu Shirou		2:00
5.	"Under the Tree of Memories (想い出の樹の下で, Omoide no ki no shita de)"	Music: Sagisu Shirou; Arrangement: Sagisu Shirou		3:10
6.	"Night and Day" (Vocals: BLUEW)	Lyrics: Katayama Keishi; Music: Katayama Keishi; Arrangement: BLUEW	Insert song: Episode 46	4:25
7.	"Orange Vice"	Music: Sagisu Shirou; Arrangement: Sagisu Shirou		2:23
8.	"I Would Want to Be a Night Ranger (ナイトレンジャーになりきりたい, NAITO RENJA- ni narikiritai)"	Music: Sagisu Shirou; Arrangement: Sagisu Shirou		1:45
9.	"Madoka's Theme ~ in Lovers Room (まどかのテーマ 〜in Lovers Room, Madoka no TE-MA ~ in Lovers Room)"	Music: Sagisu Shirou; Arrangement: Sagisu Shirou		2:26
10.	"Romantic with You (君とRomantic, Kimi to Romantic)"	Music: Sagisu Shirou; Arrangement: Sagisu Shirou		2:16
11.	"My Little Girl"	Music: Sagisu Shirou; Arrangement: Sagisu Shirou		1:50
12.	"Next to Come (3rd. season)"	Music: Sagisu Shirou; Arrangement: Sagisu Shirou		0:30
13.	"Actress in the Mirror (鏡の中のアクトレス, kagami no naka no AKUTORESU)" (Vocals: Nakahara Meiko)	Lyrics: Nakahara Meiko; Music: Nakahara Meiko; Arrangement: Nishihira Akira	Opening theme 3	3:31
14.	"Love Is in Your Eyes (愛は瞳の中に, Ai wa hitomi no naka ni)"	Music: Sagisu Shirou; Arrangement: Sagisu Shirou		4:14
15.	"Tell Me That You Love Me"	Music: Nobody; Arrangement: Sagisu Shirou		2:18
16.	"One More Yesterday (もうひとつのイエスタデイ, Mou hitotsu no IESUTADEI)" (Vocals: Wada Kanako)	Lyrics: Tetsu; Music: Nagashima Hideyuki; Arrangement: Sagisu Shirou	Insert song	4:35
17.	"See You Tomorrow! (また明日!, Mata ashita!)"	Music: Sagisu Shirou; Arrangement: Sagisu Shirou		1:38

Bonus tracks (1999 rerelease)
No.	Title	Notes	Length
18.	"One More Yesterday (Karaoke Version)" (Mou hitotsu no IESUTADEI (もうひとつのイエスタデイ(カラオケ)))	Insert song	4:
19.	"Dance in the Memories (Karaoke Version)" ((ダンス・イン・ザ・メモリーズ(カラオケ)))	Ending theme 3	4:

== Kimagure Orange Road CD Collection - Special BGM Shuu Tsuki ==
Kimagure Orange Road CD Collection - Special BGM Shuu Tsuki

Soundtrack album
- Released: March 21, 1986
- Genre: Japanese Anime Pop
- Length: 51:02
- Label: Victor

Serial No – VDR-1171

This is a collection of songs from the "Shonen Jump Special Anime" in November 1985, before the TV series was made.

No.	Title	Notes	Length
1.	"Just Plucking off Love (mogitate no koi)" (Vocals: Kawauchi Rie)	Opening theme	3:20
2.	"Scorching Paradise (shakunetsu paradise)"		1:22
3.	"Seaside Dream (Seaside yochi Dream)"		2:55
4.	"Summertime Triangle"		2:52
5.	"Kimagure Angel (Kimagure tenshi)" (Vocals: Kawauchi Rie)		4:21
6.	"de Maimu que"		2:21
7.	"Beating Summertime Graffiti (tokimeki natsu-iro graffiti)" (Vocals: Kawauchi Rie)		1:44
8.	"Jealous Beat (beat de shitto)"		4:14
9.	"Island of Forbidden Love (kinjirareta koi no shima)"		3:10
10.	"Love Chase at the Beach (nagisa no Love Chase)"		4:36
11.	"'Heart' o Nice Catch" (Vocals: Kawauchi Rie)		3:23
12.	"Waku Waku Island"		2:30
13.	"Telepathy Scramble"		1:20
14.	"Marine Paradise"		1:21
15.	"Escape"		1:46
16.	"ABCB"		2:21
17.	"Don't Make Me Get Lost, Madonna (mayowasenaide Madonna)"		1:14
18.	"Secret Command (himitsu shirei)"		1:16
19.	"My Darling Love (itoshi no My Love)"		1:18
20.	"Carrying Summer Memories... (natsu no omoi o nosete...)"		1:11

== Kimagure Orange Station ==
Kimagure Orange Station

Soundtrack album by Various
- Released: April 6, 1988
- Genres: Soundtrack, J-pop
- Length: 49:34
- Label: Futureland

Kimagure Orange Station (きまぐれオレンジ☆ステーション, Kimagure Orenji Sutēshon) is a compilation album released for the anime television series Kimagure Orange Road. The album was produced by Futureland and released in Japan on April 6, 1988. The release was made to sound like a radio station recording, with the four main characters from the series acting as DJs.

No.	Title	Writer(s)	Notes	Length
1.	"Orange Mystery (オレンジ・ミステリー, Orenji Misuterī)" (Vocals: Hideyuki Nagashima)	Lyrics: Masao Urino; Music: Nobody; Arrangement: Shirō Sagisu	Second opening theme	3:51
2.	"A Sad Heart Is Burning (悲しいハートは燃えている, Kanashii Hāto wa Moeteiru)" (Vocals: Kanako Wada)	Lyrics: Kazuki Matsumoto; Music: Daisuke Inoue; Arrangement: Hiroshi Shinkawa	Second ending theme	4:04
3.	"Look Back My Darling (ふり向いてマイ・ダーリン, Furimuite Mai Dārin)" (Vocals: Minako Fujishiro)	Lyrics: Takashi Sawachi; Music: Shirō Sagisu; Arrangement: Shirō Sagisu	Insert song, episode 24	3:56
4.	"Breaking Heart (ブレイキングハート, Bureikingu Hāto)" (Vocals: Yuiko Tsubokura)	Lyrics: Show; Music: Shirō Sagisu; Arrangement: Shirō Sagisu	Insert song, episode 13	4:02
5.	"Actress in the Mirror (鏡の中のアクトレス, Kagami no Naka no Akutoresu)" (Vocals: Meiko Nakahara)	Lyrics: Meiko Nakahara; Music: Meiko Nakahara; Arrangement: Akira Nishihira	Third opening theme	3:31
6.	"Dangerous Triangle (危険なトライアングル, Kiken na Toraianguru)" (Vocals: Masanori Ikeda)	Lyrics: Masao Urino; Music: Tsunehiro Izumi; Arrangement: Hiroshi Shinkawa	Insert song, episode 11	4:14
7.	"Dance in the Memories (ダンス・イン・ザ・メモリーズ, Dansu in za Memorīzu)" (Vocals: Maiko Nakahara)	Lyrics: Meiko Nakahara; Music: Meiko Nakahara; Arrangement: Akira Nishihira	Third ending theme	4:09
8.	"Summer Mirage (夏のミラージュ, Natsu no Mirāju)" (Vocals: Kanako Wada)	Lyrics: Reiko Yukawa; Music: Tsukasa; Arrangement: Shirō Sagisu	First ending theme	4:30
9.	"Like a Salvia (サルビアの花のように, Sarubia no Hana no yō ni)" (Vocals: Kanako Wada)	Lyrics: Reiko Yukawa; Music: Yūichirō Oda; Arrangement: Jun Irie	Insert song, episode 22	3:58
10.	"Night of Summer Side" (Vocals: Masanori Ikeda)	Lyrics: Masao Urino; Music: Nobody; Arrangement: Hiroshi Shinkawa	First opening theme	4:06

The album was rereleased in 1999 by Futureland (TYCY-5069) with two additional bonus karaoke tracks.

Bonus tracks (1999 rerelease)
No.	Title	Length
11.	"A Sad Heart Is Burning"
12.	"Actress in the Mirror"

== Kimagure Orange Road – Singing Heart ==
Kimagure Orange Road – Singing Heart

Soundtrack album
- Released: December 25, 1987
- Genre: Japanese Anime Pop
- Length: 50:42
- Label: Futureland

Serial No – LD32-5061

No.	Title	Writer(s)	Notes	Length
1.	"Summer Mirage (夏のミラージュ, natsu no MIRA-JU)" (Vocals: Wada Kanako)	Lyrics: Yukawa Reiko; Music: Tsukasa; Arrangement: Sagisu Shirou	Ending theme 1	4:30
2.	"Orange Mystery (オレンジ・ミステリー, ORENJI MISUTERII)" (Vocals: Nagashima Hideyuki)	Lyrics: Masao Urino; Music: Nobody; Arrangement: Sagisu Shirou	Opening theme 2	3:51
3.	"Look Back My Darling (ふり向いてマイ・ダーリン, Furimuite MAI DAARIN)" (Vocals: Fujishiro Minako)	Lyrics: Sawachi Takashi; Music: Sagisu Shirou; Arrangement: Sagisu Shirou	Insert song: Episode 24	3:56
4.	"Janina (ジェニーナ, JENI-NA)" (Vocals: Wada Kanako)	Lyrics: Yukawa Reiko; Music: Sagisu Shirou; Arrangement: Sagisu Shirou	Insert song: Episode 12	4:38
5.	"Night of Summer Side" (Vocals: Ikeda Masanori)	Lyrics: Urino Masao; Music: Nobody; Arrangement: Shinkawa Hiroshi	Opening theme 1	4:06
6.	"One More Yesterday (もうひとつのイエスタデイ, Mou hitotsu no IESUTADEI)" (Vocals: Wada Kanako)	Lyrics: Yukawa Reiko; Music: Oda Yuuichirou; Arrangement: Irie Jun	Insert song	4:35
7.	"Again" (Vocals: Fujishiro Minako)	Lyrics: Sawachi Takashi; Music: Sagisu Shirou; Arrangement: Sagisu Shirou		3:51
8.	"Breaking Heart (ブレイキングハート, BUREIKINGU HAATO)" (Vocals: Tsubokura Yuiko)	Lyrics: Show; Music: Sagisu Shirou; Arrangement: Sagisu Shirou	Insert song: Episode 13	4:02
9.	"Like a Salvia Flower (サルビアの花のように, SARUBIA no hana no you ni)" (Vocals: Wada Kanako)	Lyrics: Yukawa Reiko; Music: Oda Yuuichirou; Arrangement: Irie Jun	Insert song: Episode 22	3:58
10.	"Dangerous Triangle (危険なトライアングル, Kiken-na TORAIANGURU)" (Vocals: Ikeda Masanori)	Lyrics: Urino Masao; Music: Izumi Tsunehiro; Arrangement: Shinkawa Hiroshi	Insert song: Episode 11	4:14
11.	"Sad Heart Is Burning (悲しいハートは燃えている, kanashii HAATO wa moete-iru)" (Vocals: Wada Kanako)	Lyrics: Matsumoto Kazuki; Music: Inoue Daisuke; Arrangement: Shinkawa Hiroshi	Ending theme 2	4:04
12.	"One More Time in My Heart (この胸にONE MORE TIME, Kono mune ni ONE MORE TIME)" (Vocals: Nagashima Hideyuki)	Lyrics: Tetsu; Music: Nagashima Hideyuki; Arrangement: Sagisu Shirou		4:40

Bonus tracks (1999 rerelease)
No.	Title	Notes	Length
13.	"Look Back My Darling (Karaoke Version)" (Furimuite MAI DAARIN (ふり向いてマイ・ダーリン(カラオケ)))	Insert song: Episode 24	3:??
14.	"Again (Karaoke Version)"		3:??

== Kimagure Orange Road – Loving Heart ==
Kimagure Orange Road - Loving Heart

Soundtrack album
- Released: April 8, 1989
- Genre: Japanese Anime Pop
- Length: 66:41
- Label: Futureland

Serial No - LD32-5099

No.	Title	Writer(s)	Notes	Length
1.	"Actress in the Mirror (鏡の中のアクトレス, kagami no naka no AKUTORESU)" (Vocals: Nakahara Meiko)	Lyrics: Nakahara Meiko; Music: Nakahara Meiko; Arrangement: Nishihira Akira	Opening theme 3	3:31
2.	"Summer Mirage (夏のミラージュ, natsu no MIRA-JU)" (Vocals: Wada Kanako)	Lyrics: Yukawa Reiko; Music: Tsukasa; Arrangement: Sagisu Shirou	Ending theme 1	4:30
3.	"Tender Jealousy (優しいジェラシー, yasashii JERASHII)" (Vocals: Tomizawa Michie・Honda Chieko)	Lyrics: Sawachi Ryu; Music: Sagisu Shirou; Arrangement: Sagisu Shirou		4:45
4.	"Sad Heart Is Burning (悲しいハートは燃えている, kanashii HAATO wa moete-iru)" (Vocals: Wada Kanako)	Lyrics: Matsumoto Kazuki; Music: Inoue Daisuke; Arrangement: Shinkawa Hiroshi	Ending theme 2	4:04
5.	"Bayside Dancer" (Vocals: Furuya Touru)	Lyrics: Sawachi Ryu; Music: Sagisu Shirou; Arrangement: Sagisu Shirou		5:32
6.	"Uncertain I Love You (不確かな I LOVE YOU, futashikana I Love You)" (Vocals: Wada Kanako)	Lyrics: Miura Noriko; Music: Mizushima Yasuhiro; Arrangement: Hiraiwa Yoshinobu		3:55
7.	"Night of Summer Side" (Vocals: Ikeda Masanori)	Lyrics: Urino Masao; Music: Nobody; Arrangement: Shinkawa Hiroshi	Opening theme 1	4:06
8.	"Golden Hill Road (こがね色の坂道, kogane-iro no sakamichi)" (Vocals: Hara Eriko)	Lyrics: Sawachi Ryu; Music: Sagisu Shirou; Arrangement: Sagisu Shirou		5:23
9.	"Dance in the Memories (ダンス・イン・ザ・メモリーズ)" (Vocals: Nakahara Meiko)	Lyrics: Nakahara Meiko; Music: Nakahara Meiko; Arrangement: Nishihira Akira	Ending theme 3	4:09
10.	"Night and Day" (Vocals: BLUEW)	Lyrics: Katayama Keishi; Music: Katayama Keishi; Arrangement: BLUEW	Insert song: Episode 46	4:25
11.	"Like a Bird (鳥のように, tori no yoo ni)" (Vocals: Wada Kanako)	Lyrics: Wada Kanako; Music: Hisaishi Jou; Arrangement: Hisaishi Jou		4:16
12.	"Dangerous Triangle (危険なトライアングル, Kiken-na TORAIANGURU)" (Vocals: Ikeda Masanori)	Lyrics: Masao Urino; Music: Izumi Tsunehiro; Arrangement: Shinkawa Hiroshi	Insert song: Episode 11	4:14
13.	"Whispering Misty Night" (Vocals: Tsuru Hiromi)	Lyrics: Sawachi Ryu; Music: Sagisu Shirou; Arrangement: Sagisu Shirou		5:17
14.	"Orange Mystery (オレンジ・ミステリー, ORENJI MISUTERII)" (Vocals: Nagashima Hideyuki)	Lyrics: Urino Masao; Music: Nobody; Arrangement: Sagisu Shirou	Opening theme 2	3:51
15.	"Embrace the Sky (あの空を抱きしめて, ano sora o dakishimete)" (Vocals: Wada Kanako)	Lyrics: Wada Kanako; Music: Izuta Hiroyuki; Arrangement: Shirai Yoshiaki		4:19

Bonus tracks (1995 rerelease)
No.	Title	Length
16.	"Tender Jealousy (Karaoke version)" (yasashii JERASHII (優しいジェラシー(カラオケ)))	4:??
17.	"Whispering Misty Night (Karaoke version)"	5:??

== Kimagure Orange Road: I Want to Return to That Day ==
Kimagure Orange Road: I Want to Return to That Day きまぐれオレンジ☆ロード あの日にかえりたい

Soundtrack album
- Released: October 5, 1988
- Genres: Soundtrack, J-pop
- Length: 36:42
- Label: Futureland

Kimagure Orange Road: I Want to Return to That Day (きまぐれオレンジ☆ロード あの日にかえりたい, Kimagure Orenji Rōdo Ano Hi ni Kaeritai) is a soundtrack album released for the anime film of the same title. The album was produced by Futureland and released in Japan on October 5, 1988.

No.	Title	Writer(s)	Theme	Length
1.	"Embracing the Sky (あの空を抱きしめて, Ano Sora o Dakishimete)" (Vocals: Kanako Wada)	Lyrics: Kanako Wada; Music: Hiroyuki Izuta; Arrangement: Yoshiaki Shirai	Opening theme	4:19
2.	"Like a Radio (ラジオのように, Rajio no yō ni)"	Music: Shirō Sagisu; Arrangement: Shirō Sagisu		2:20
3.	"Say Good-bye"	Music: Shirō Sagisu; Arrangement: Shirō Sagisu		1:22
4.	"Return to Three"	Music: Shirō Sagisu; Arrangement: Shirō Sagisu		2:06
5.	"I Don't Know Why, Why You Don't!?"	Music: Shirō Sagisu; Arrangement: Shirō Sagisu		1:53
6.	"Sorrowful Gamble (哀しい賭け, Kanashii Kake)"	Music: Shirō Sagisu; Arrangement: Shirō Sagisu		2:12
7.	"Always at ABCB (いつもABCB(アバカブ)で, Itsumo Abucabu de)"	Music: Shirō Sagisu; Arrangement: Shirō Sagisu		5:09
8.	"The Pest's Graffiti (オジャマ虫's グラフィティ, Ojamamushi no Gurafiti)"	Music: Shirō Sagisu; Arrangement: Shirō Sagisu		1:13
9.	"An Uncertain 'I Love You' (不確かな I LOVE YOU, Futashika na Ai Rabu Yū)" (Vocals: Kanako Wada)	Lyrics: Noriko Miura; Music: Yasuhiro Mizushima; Arrangement: Yoshinobu Hiraiwa	Ending theme	3:55
10.	"Shop of "Dry""	Music: Shirō Sagisu; Arrangement: Shirō Sagisu		2:27
11.	"Beat Emotion"	Music: Shirō Sagisu; Arrangement: Shirō Sagisu		1:25
12.	"Teardrops"	Music: Shirō Sagisu; Arrangement: Shirō Sagisu		0:31
13.	"Call My Name"	Music: Shirō Sagisu; Arrangement: Shirō Sagisu		1:26
14.	"Be Your Only One"	Music: Shirō Sagisu; Arrangement: Shirō Sagisu		1:52
15.	"Like a Bird (鳥のように, Tori no yō ni)" (Vocals: Kanako Wada)	Lyrics: Kanako Wada; Music: Joe Hisaishi; Arrangement: Joe Hisaishi	Insert song	4:16
Total length:				36:42

The album was rereleased in 1999 (TYCY-5084, Futureland) with the following two bonus karaoke tracks:

1999 reissue bonus tracks
No.	Title	Length
16.	"Embracing the Sky" (Karaoke version)
17.	"An Uncertain 'I Love You'" (Karaoke version)

== New Kimagure Orange Road Original Soundtrack ==
New Kimagure Orange Road Original Soundtrack

Soundtrack album by Yuki Kajiura, various
- Released: October 31, 1996
- Genres: Anime soundtrack, classical, jazz
- Length: 68:27
- Label: VAP

The New Kimagure Orange Road Original Soundtrack (新きまぐれ オレンジロード そして、あの夏のはじまり オリジナル サウンドトラック, Shin Kimagure Orenji Rōdo: Soshite, Ano Natsu no Hajimari Orijinaru Saundotorakku) is the soundtrack album for the 1996 Shin Kimagure Orange Road: Summer's Beginning anime film. The soundtrack was released in Japan on October 31, 1996, by VAP. The title literally means "And so, the Beginning of That Summer".

No.	Title	Theme	Length
1.	"Opening Theme (KYOSUKE No.1)"	Opening theme	3:45
2.	"Love I"		3:51
3.	"Memory I (思い出I, Omoide I)"		2:32
4.	"At a Loss (途方に暮れて, Tohou ni kurete)"		3:27
5.	"From a Window (KYOSUKE No.1) (窓辺から (KYOSUKE No.1), Madobe kara)"		3:17
6.	"Where Are You... (何処にいるの..., Doko ni iru-no...)"		3:26
7.	"Love Is Power"	Insert song	5:06
8.	"Memory II (思い出II, Omoide II)"		3:17
9.	"Lounge I (ラウンジI)"		2:04
10.	"Lounge II (ラウンジII)"		1:55
11.	"Intersecting Hearts (交錯する想い, Kousa-suru Omoi)"		3:42
12.	"Theme of Kyousuke I (恭介のテーマI, Kyousuke no Theme I)"		2:00
13.	"Meeting Again (再会, Saikai)"		1:45
14.	"Don't Be Afraid"	Insert song	4:07
15.	"Door to the Other World (異世界の扉, Isekai eno Tobira)"		6:23
16.	"I Want You to Be Here (KYOSUKE No.1) (あなたにここにいて欲しい(KYOSUKE No.1), Anata ni koko ni ite-hoshii)"		3:48
17.	"Theme of Kyosuke II (恭介のテーマII, Kyosuke no Theme II)"		1:41
18.	"Love II"		4:42
19.	"Being Close Together (寄り添う2人(KYOSUKE No.1), Yorisou Futari)"		3:47
20.	"Now, and Future (今, そしてこれから, Ima, soshite Korekara)"		3:41
21.	"Day Dream - I'm at Your Side (DAY DREAM〜そばにいるよ, DAY DREAM - Soba ni iruyo)"	Main theme	4:11
Total length:			68:27
