= List of Hiatari Ryōkō! episodes =

This article is a list of Hiatari Ryōkō! episodes, an anime television series based on a manga series of the same title by Mitsuru Adachi. The TV series began airing in Japan on 22 March 1987 on the Fuji TV Network in Japan. The series ran for one year, with episode 48 airing on 20 March 1988.

== Summary of series ==
Each TV episode is about 25 minutes long.

No.	Title	Original release date
1	"Kasumi and Yūsaku Meet...in the Bath?!"; Transliteration: "Kasumi to Yūsaku: Deai wa Ofuro de...?!" (Japanese: かすみと勇作·出会いはおフロで...!?)	29 March 1987
2	"The First Storm of Spring! Who's the Boss of the Cheer Squad?"; Transliteration: "Haruichiban! Ōendan no Bosu wa Dare?" (Japanese: 春一番!応援団のボスは誰?)	5 April 1987
3	"Entrance Ceremony Pandemonium! The Shadowy Cheer Squad Appeared!!"; Transliteration: "Nyūgakushiki Ōare! Detekita zo Kage no Ōendan!!" (Japanese: 入学式大荒れ!でてきたぞ影の応援団!!)	12 April 1987
4	"Kasumi in Danger! The Cheer Squad Leader Has a Secret"; Transliteration: "Kasumi ga Abunai! Ōendan-chō ni wa Himitsu ga Aru zo" (Japanese: かすみがあぶない!応援団長には秘密があるぞ)	19 April 1987
5	"The Squad Leader's Misgivings: What Kind of Guy is the Mysterious Man Kodama"; Transliteration: "Danchō no Giwaku: Nazo no Otoko Kodama wa Ittai Nanimono Da" (Japanese: 団長の疑惑·謎の男児玉は一体何者だ)	26 April 1987
6	"Yūsaku Raids the Ōendan!? The Squad Leader Mystery Is Solved"; Transliteration: "Yūsaku: Ōendan ni Nagurikomi!? Danchō no Nazo wa Toketa zo" (Japanese: 勇作·応援団に殴り込み!? 団長の謎は解けたゾ)	3 May 1987
7	"Let's Rebuild the Baseball Team! His Heart Swore to the Sunset"; Transliteration: "Saa Yakyūbu o Tate Naose! Yūhi ni Chikatta Aitsu no Kokoro" (Japanese: さあ野球部をたて直せ!夕日に誓ったあいつの心)	May 10, 1987
8	"Deliver the Rookie Match full of Scratches! Yusaku's Cheer Song"; Transliteration: "Kasumi Shōdarake no Shinjinsen to Doke! Yūsaku no Ōenka" (Japanese: かすみ傷だらけの新人戦 とどけ!勇作の応援歌)	May 17, 1987
9	"The Baseball Club Is in a Pinch!! The First Practice Game"; Transliteration: "Yakyūbu ga Pinchi Da!! Hajimete no Renshū Jiai" (Japanese: 野球部がピンチだ!! 初めての練習試合)	May 24, 1987
10	"What, Yūsaku is Joining the Baseball Club!?"; Transliteration: "E! Yūsaku ga Yakyūbu ni!? Kyaputen Seki no Mou Nokku" (Japanese: エッ 勇作が野球部に!? キャプテン関の猛ノック)	May 31, 1987
11	"Keiko's Passionate Desire... A Date just for the Two of Us"; Transliteration: "Keiko no Atsui Omoi wa... Futari Dake no Dēto" (Japanese: 圭子の熱い想いは...二人だけのデート)	June 7, 1987
12	"Chaos! Kasumi and Keiko's Love Number 8"; Transliteration: "Daikonran! Kasumi to Keiko no Ai no Sebangō 8" (Japanese: 大混乱!かすみと圭子の愛の背番号8)	June 14, 1987
13	"Miracle!? Meijo Baseball Club Wins the Round with a Walk-Off"; Transliteration: "Kiseki!? Myōjō Yakyūbu Ikkaisen Sayonaragachi" (Japanese: 奇跡!? 明条野球部·1回戦サヨナラ勝ち)	June 21, 1987
14	"What's Wrong Yusaku?! Right Now, It's All About Koshien!"; Transliteration: "Dō Shita Yūsaku?! Ima wa Tonikaku Kōshien!" (Japanese: どうした勇作?! 今はとにかく甲子園!)	June 28, 1987
15	"Sorry Katsuhiko! Just Tonight with Him..."; Transliteration: "Gomen ne Katsuhiko-san! Kon'ya dake Aitsu to..." (Japanese: ゴメンネ克彦さん!今夜だけあいつと‥‥)	July 5, 1987
16	"We Can't Lose! Kasumi is Fired Up for the Semi-Finals"; Transliteration: "Makerarenai! Kasumi mo Moeru Junkesshō!" (Japanese: 負けられない!かすみも燃える準決勝!)	July 12, 1987
17	"Give it Your All Today! The Final is Going to be Exciting!"; Transliteration: "Kyō o Seiippai! Atsuku Nariso na Kesshōsen!" (Japanese: 今日を精一杯!熱くなりそな決勝戦!)	August 2, 1987
18	"Watch, it Katsuhiko! The Final Match is Over"; Transliteration: "Mite Ite Katsuhiko-san! Omoikkiri Kesshōsen" (Japanese: 見ていて克彦さん!思いっきり決勝戦)	August 9, 1987
19	"Why? Who is to Blame for these Unstoppable Tears?"; Transliteration: "Dōshite na no? Tomaranai Namida wa Dare no Sei" (Japanese: どうしてなの?とまらない涙は誰のせい)	August 16, 1987
20	"Let me Kiss You! The Midsummer Sea is Full of Danger"; Transliteration: "Kisu Sasete! Manatsu no Umi wa Kiken ga Ippai" (Japanese: キスさせて!真夏の海は危険がいっぱい)	August 30, 1987
21	"On a Lonely Afternoon: My Heart is Shaking and the Temperature is at its Highest"; Transliteration: "Hitori dake no Gogo: Yureru Hāto mo Saikō Kion" (Japanese: 一人だけの午後 ゆれるハートも最高気温)	September 6, 1987
22	"Head-on Collision!? The Two Intriguing Ricals Declare Their Rivalry"; Transliteration: "Shōmen Shōtotsu!? Ki ni Naru Futari no Raibaru Sengen" (Japanese: 正面衝突!?気になる二人のライバル宣言)	September 13, 1987
23	"When Can we Meet Again? With Prayers, The Final Fireworks"; Transliteration: "Itsu Aeru? Inori o Komete Saigo no Hanabi" (Japanese: いつ会える? 祈りをこめて最後の花火)	September 20, 1987
24	"Hot Airmail: Don't Listen to my Heart Right Now"; Transliteration: "Atsui Ea Meiru: Ima wa Hāto o Kikanaide" (Japanese: 熱いエアメイル 今はハートを聞かないで)	September 27, 1987
25	"Don't Get Me Wrong! We're just Roommates"; Transliteration: "Gokai Shinaide! Tada no Dōkyonin nan da kara" (Japanese: 誤解しないで!ただの同居人なんだから)	October 4, 1987
26	"Do You Want to Go on a Date? Who is Yusaku's Cheerleader"; Transliteration: "Dēto Sasetai no? Yūsaku wa Dare no Ōendan" (Japanese: デートさせたいの?勇作は誰の応援団)	October 11, 1987
27	"Don't Worry! The Strange Date was Arranged by Him"; Transliteration: "Shinpai Muyō! Aitsu ga Shikunda Kimyō na Dēto" (Japanese: 心配無用!あいつが仕組んだ奇妙なデート)	October 18, 1987
28	"My Heart is in a Storm: I'm Alone with Him Tonight"; Transliteration: "Hāto mo Bōfūu: Kon'ya wa Aitsu to Futarikiri" (Japanese: ハートも暴風雨 今夜はあいつと二人きり)	October 25, 1987
29	"Huh? Missing the Fall Tournament? What's Going to Happen to the Baseball Team"; Transliteration: "E' Shūki Taikai ni Ketsujō? Dō Naru no Yakyūbu" (Japanese: えッ秋季大会に欠場?どうなるの野球部)	November 1, 1987
30	"The Baseball Team is in a Pinch! I Can't just Stand by and Watch"; Transliteration: "Yakyūbu Pinchi! Damatte Mite wa Irarenai" (Japanese: 野球部ピンチ!黙って見てはいられない)	November 8, 1987
31	"What!? That Person? The New Director Dressed in a Suit"; Transliteration: "E'!? Ano Hito ga? Sūtsu de Kimeta Shin-kantoku" (Japanese: えっ!? あの人が?スーツで決めた新監督)	November 15, 1987
32	"Sounds Interesting, Coach Katsuhiko's First Practice"; Transliteration: "Omoshirosō ne, Kantoku Katsuhiko-san no Hatsu-renshū" (Japanese: おもしろそうね 監督克彦さんの初練習)	November 22, 1987
33	"The Fall Tournament is Finally Here: How Good is the New Baseball Team?"; Transliteration: "Iyoiyo Shūki Taikai: Shinsei Yakyūbu no Jitsuryoku wa?" (Japanese: いよいよ秋季大会 新生野球部の実力は?)	November 29, 1987
34	"An Explosion of Frustration? A Baseball Team that Can't Play Baseball"; Transliteration: "Fuman Bakuhatsu? Yakyū ga Dekinai Yakyūbu nante" (Japanese: 不満爆発?野球ができない野球部なんて)	December 6, 1987
35	"The Misunderstanding Theater Festival: Why Does Yusaku Not Know?"; Transliteration: "Surechigai Engekisai: Nande Yūsaku wa Shirankao?" (Japanese: すれ違い演劇祭 なんで勇作は知らん顔?)	December 13, 1987
36	"Sorry Kasumi-chan: Santa's Gift"; Transliteration: "Kasumi-chan Gomen: Iki na Santa no Okurimono" (Japanese: かすみちゃんゴメン イキなサンタの贈り物)	December 20, 1987
37	"High Expectations! Kasumi and Yusaki Take Part in the Quiz"; Transliteration: "Kitai ga Omoi! Kuizu ni Shutsujō: Kasumi to Yūsaku" (Japanese: 期待が重い!クイズに出場 かすみと勇作)	December 27, 1987
38	"A Cold Wind Endurance Contest that Will Make your Body and Mind Tremble"; Transliteration: "Mi mo Kokoro mo Furueru Omoi: Kanpū no Gaman Taikai" (Japanese: 身も心も震える思い寒風のガマン大会)	January 10, 1988
39	"I want to Hear your True Feelings! If Things Continue Like This, The Two of You Will..."; Transliteration: "Honne ga Kikitai! Kono Mama ja Futari wa..." (Japanese: 本音が聞きたい!このままじゃ二人は...)	January 17, 1988
40	"Yusaku's Spirited Approach Defeats Five People! Save the Weak Kendo Club"; Transliteration: "Kihaku no Yūsaku Go Nin Nuki! Jakutai Kendōbu o Sukue" (Japanese: 気迫の勇作五人抜き!弱体剣道部を救え)	January 24, 1988
41	"An Exciting TourL Take Kasumi Skating"; Transliteration: "Hakunetsu Tsuā: Kasumi o Sukī ni Tsuretette" (Japanese: 白熱ツアー かすみをスキーに連れてって)	January 31, 1988
42	"Shipwrecked...!? Tell Me You Love Me Before You Die!"; Transliteration: "Sōnan...!? Shinu Mae ni Suki da to Itte!" (Japanese: 遭難...!?死ぬ前に好きだと言って!)	February 7, 1988
43	"I Like Both! The Subtle Haze of a Swaying Heart"; Transliteration: "Dotchi mo Suki! Yureru Hāto ga Bimyō na Kasumi" (Japanese: どっちも好き!ゆれるハートが微妙なかすみ)	February 14, 1988
44	"The Burning Baseball Club: We're the Secret Weapon!?"; Transliteration: "Moechatta Yakyūbu: Oretachi ga Himitsu Heiki!?" (Japanese: 燃えちゃった野球部 俺たちが秘密兵器!?)	February 21, 1988
45	"If You're Going To Hit It, Go for It! A Man's Match Between Katsuhiko and Yusaku"; Transliteration: "Utsu nara Utte Miro! Otoko no Shōbu: Katsuhiko Tai Yūsaku" (Japanese: 打つなら打ってみろ! 男の勝負 克彦対勇作)	February 28, 1988
46	"Yusaku Joins the Baseball Team!? This Time, Kasumi is on the Cheerleading Squad"; Transliteration: "Yūsaku ga Yakyūbu e!? Kondo wa Kasumi ga Ōendan" (Japanese: 勇作が野球部へ!? 今度はかすみが応援団)	March 6, 1988
47	"Kasumi is Transferring Schools!? Is it Okay for Us to Just Leave Each Other like This?"; Transliteration: "Kasumi ga Tenkō!? Kono Mama Hanaretemo Ii no?" (Japanese: かすみが転校!? このまま離れてもいいの？)	March 13, 1988
48	"Farewell Memories: Tears Don't Suit a Smile"; Transliteration: "Sayonara Omoide: Egao ni Namida wa Niawanai" (Japanese: さよなら想い出 笑顔に涙は似合わない)	20 March 1988
