= Kanako Wada =

Japanese singer (born 1961)

Kanako Wada 和田 加奈子
- Born: 28 October 1961 (age 64)
- Origin: Toyonaka, Osaka Prefecture, Japan
- Genres: Pop
- Occupation: Singer-songwriter
- Instrument: Vocals
- Label: Toshiba EMI
- Spouse: Mike Maki

Kanako Wada (Japanese: 和田 加奈子, Hepburn: Wada Kanako; born 28 October 1961) is a Japanese singer and songwriter. Originally studying classical piano, she studied sculpture and managed the rugby team at the Tokyo University of the Arts before being scouted at a concert she organized. Debuting in November 1985, she released seven original albums and eleven singles with Toshiba EMI before retiring in 1991. She was also a television personality who worked as Akira Inoue's assistant on NHK's Best Sound II, as well as a radio personality at networks such as Asahi Broadcasting Corporation and Nippon Cultural Broadcasting. Her music has received renewed attention amidst the city pop boom of the 2010s and 2020s.

== Biography ==
Kanako Wada, a native of Toyonaka, was born on 28 October 1961. She spent ten years studying classical piano, and graduated from the Department of Sculpture at the Tokyo University of the Arts (Tokyogeidai) Faculty of Fine Arts in March 1986. While at Tokyogeidai, she performed for bands specializing pop and reggae and worked as a concert organizer. She also worked as the manager of the rugby team, where she would "[wash] the players' mud-covered uniforms every day", and worked with clay and stone-carving as a sculpture student.

Wada's solo music career started after a talent agency scout discovered her following her performance at one of the concerts she organized. Her debut single "Passing Through" was released on 21 November 1985; the songwriting debut of Neko Oikawa, it was the winning song of Yumi Matsutoya's TBS Radio show Yuming no O-jama Shimasu. She later released ten more singles. She also released seven original albums: Tenderness (1986), Quiet Storm (1987), Kana (1987), Vocu (1988), Dear (1989), Dessert ni Hoshikuzu no Jelly o (1990), and Yakusoku no Eve (1990). She performed two ending theme songs for Kimagure Orange Road – "Natsu no Mirage" and "Kanashii Heart wa Moeteiru" – and some of her songs were commercial songs, including "Dreamin' Lady" for House Foods's Soup Spaghetti, "Heart de Furimuite" for Menard, and "Wake Up Dream" for Morinaga Milk Industry's Piknik. A greatest-hits album, Esquisse, was released in August 1987. She also wrote lyrics for over a dozen of her own songs.

Carlos/Giancarla Ross of THEM Anime Reviews described Wada's songs in Kimagure Orange Road: The Movie as "mournfully plaintive ballads simply perfect for the soundtrack, almost tear-jerking in its own right," and Christi, also of THEM Anime Reviews said that Wada's songs in Kimagure Orange Road "will definitely hit the heart". According to a 2024 Re:minder article by Eiji Makaino, jazz standards were an important part of Wada's music.

In April 1986, Wada started working as an assistant host on television programming, with her work including as Akira Inoue's assistant on NHK's Best Sound II. She also became a radio personality at networks such as Asahi Broadcasting Corporation and Nippon Cultural Broadcasting.

In 1991, Wada retired as a singer. She rarely makes public appearances since then, with most of these being with her husband. In August 2023, she held a brief concert at Kabuki Lounge, located in Kabukichō, Shinjuku.

Following the city pop boom of the 2010s and 2020s, Wada's music has gained renewed attention, with "Natsu no Mirage" being an example. In December 2019, Tower Records re-released three of her original albums – Tenderness, Quiet Storm, and Kana – in CD format. Kana (1987) received a vinyl re-release in 2021, and Esquisse received a re-release as part of the City Pop Selections series in 2022. Her acoustic concert Kanako Wada Acoustic Live: Tokubetsu Seat was held at Claps in Roppongi on 15 November 2024; Motohiro Makaino of Re:minder said that it "offered a sophisticated blend of pop sensibilities and a jazzy atmosphere".

Wada married actor Mike Maki. The couple have two sons, and she has three stepsons from Maki's previous marriages: actor Claude Maki and surfers Hayato Maki and Taito Maki.

== Discography ==
=== Albums ===
==== Original albums ====
Title	Year	Details	Peak chart positions		Sales
Title	Year	Details	JPN	JPN Hot	Sales
Tenderness	1986	Released: 1 February 1986; Label: Toshiba EMI	—	—	—
Quiet Storm (stylized in all-caps)	1987	Released: 4 March 1987; Label: Toshiba EMI	—	—	—
Kana (stylized in all-caps)	1987	Released: 25 December 1987; Label: Toshiba EMI	—	—	—
Vocu (stylized in all-caps)	1988	Released: 6 November 1988; Label: Toshiba EMI	29	—	—
Dear (stylized in low-caps)	1989	Released: 13 December 1989; Label: Toshiba EMI	—	—	—
Dessert ni Hoshikuzu no Jelly o (DESSERTに星くずのゼリーを)	1990	Released: 27 September 1990; Label: Toshiba EMI	—	—	—
Yakusoku no Eve (約束のイブ)	1990	Released: 28 November 1990; Label: Toshiba EMI	—	—	—
"—" denotes releases that did not chart or were not released in that region.

=== Compilations ===
Title	Year	Details	Peak chart positions		Sales
Title	Year	Details	JPN	JPN Hot	Sales
Esquiss	1987	Released: 5 August 1987; Label: Toshiba EMI	—	—	—
Golden Best (ゴールデン☆ベスト)	2006	Released: 21 June 2006; Label: Toshiba EMI	—	—	—
"—" denotes releases that did not chart or were not released in that region.

=== Singles ===
Title	Year	Details	Peak chart positions		Sales
Title	Year	Details	JPN	JPN Hot	Sales
"Passing Through" (パッシング・スルー)	1985	Released: 21 November 1985; Label: Toshiba EMI	49	—	—
"Boy" (stylized in all-caps)	1986	Released: 1986; Label: Toshiba EMI	—	—	—
"Creation My Heart"	1986	Released: 1986; Label: Toshiba EMI	—	—	—
"Natsu no Mirage" (夏のミラージュ)	1987	Released: 1 May 1987; Label: Toshiba EMI	—	—	—
"Kanashii Heart wa Moeteiru" (悲しいハートは燃えている)	1987	Released: 16 September 1987; Label: Toshiba EMI	30	—	—
"Tanjobi wa Minus 1" (誕生日はマイナス1)	1988	Released: 1988; Label: Toshiba EMI	—	—	—
"Lucky Love" (stylized in all-caps)	1988	Released: 25 May 1988; Label: Toshiba EMI	35	—	—
"Ano Sora o Dakishimete" (あの空を抱きしめて)	1988	Released: 5 October 1988; Label: Toshiba EMI	—	—	—
"Dreamin' Lady" (stylized in all-caps)	1989	Released: 4 October 1989; Label: Toshiba EMI	33	—	—
"Heart de Furimuite" (HEARTでふりむいて)	1990	Released: 4 June 1990; Label: Toshiba EMI	—	—	—
"Wake Up Dream" (stylized in low-caps)	1991	Released: 5 July 1991; Label: Toshiba EMI	—	—	—
"—" denotes releases that did not chart or were not released in that region.
