= 1990 in animation =

1990 in animation is an overview of notable events, including notable awards, list of films released, television show debuts and endings, and notable deaths.

== Events ==
=== January ===
- January 14: The Simpsons episode "Bart the Genius" first airs featuring the signature title sequence with Bart's chalkboard gag and the family's couch gag. Bart Simpson also uses the phrase "Eat My Shorts" for the first time and the characters Edna Krabappel and Martin Prince first appear.
- January 21: The Simpsons episode "Homer's Odyssey" first airs with Otto Mann, Chief Wiggum, Waylon Smithers, Jasper Beardsley, Sherri and Terri making their debuts.
- January 28: The Simpsons episode "There's No Disgrace Like Home" first airs with the policemen Lou and Eddie making their debuts.

=== February ===
- February 4: The Simpsons episode "Bart the General" first airs with Nelson Muntz making his debut.
- February 11: The Simpsons episode "Moaning Lisa" first airs with Bleeding Gums Murphy making his debut.
- February 18: The Simpsons episode "The Call of the Simpsons" first airs.
- February 25: The Simpsons episode "The Telltale Head" first airs with Sideshow Bob, Reverend Lovejoy, Jimbo Jones, Dolph Starbeam, Kearney Zzyzwicz, and the infamous Apu Nahasapeemapetilon making their debuts.

=== March ===
- March 7: The first episode of Pingu is broadcast.
- March 26: 62nd Academy Awards:
  - Balance wins the Academy Award for Best Animated Short Film.
  - Alan Menken's soundtrack for The Little Mermaid receives the Academy Award for Best Original Score, Menken and Howard Ashman win the Academy Award for Best Original Song for their song "Under the Sea". The song was performed by singer Samuel E. Wright, and influenced by the musical styles calypso and reggae.

=== April ===
- April 21: The drug prevention TV cartoon Cartoon All-Stars to the Rescue airs on four channels at once in the United States. It is notable for officially featuring cartoon characters from different animation studios all together in one film.

=== May ===
- May 13: The Simpsons concludes its first season on Fox with the episode "Some Enchanted Evening".

=== July ===
- July 6: Hanna-Barbera releases Jetsons: The Movie. This movie met negative attention during the release, including the lack of humor and the result of replacing Janet Waldo with then-pop singer Tiffany as the voice of Judy Jetson, as Waldo was dismayed about this. The Jetsons would retire from subsequent medias until 2017.

=== August ===
- August 3: DuckTales the Movie: Treasure of the Lost Lamp, the adaptation to the animated Disney series, is first released, receiving mixed to positive reviews.
- August 8: The first episode of Moomin is broadcast.

=== September ===
- September 7: The first episode of TaleSpin, produced by the Walt Disney Company, airs.
- September 8:
  - The first episode of Bobby's World is broadcast.
  - New Kids on the Block, a celebrity animated TV show based on the popularity of the boy band New Kids on the Block airs, but only lasts a season.
  - The first episode of The Adventures of Super Mario Bros. 3 airs. This second installment of Super Mario Bros. by DIC Entertainment hues closer to the NES game.
  - The first episode of Fox's Peter Pan & the Pirates airs.
  - Following the success of Saved By the Bell, NBC begins airing independent animated programs for Saturday mornings, including Kid 'n Play and Gravedale High, alongside the sketch series Guys Next Door, which would gain interest to the young adult audiences, prior to the launch of the teen oriented block TNBC two years later. This was skipped out from the Fall 1991 season due to then-president George H. W. Bush signed a deal to air educational programs for children, known as the Children's Television Act, which ended the Saturday morning cartoons on the network quickly after regarding the experience as an overwhelmed disappointment.
- September 14: Warner Bros. Animation's first original television series Tiny Toon Adventures premieres on CBS.
- September 15:
  - The first episode of Captain Planet and the Planeteers airs.
  - Season 3 of Garfield and Friends begins on CBS with the premiere of the following episodes:
    - "Skyway Robbery/The Bunny Rabbits is Coming!/Close Encounters of the Garfield Kind"
    - "Astrocat/Cock-A-Doodle Duel/Cinderella Cat"
- September 13: Woody Woodpecker receives a star on the Hollywood Walk of Fame.
- September 25: The first episode of The Dreamstone airs.
- September 28: The Danish film War of the Birds is first released.
- September 29: The first episode of Widget airs.

=== October ===
- October 7: The first episode of Mannetje & Mannetje is broadcast on TV, an adaptation of Hanco Kolk and Peter de Wit's photo comic of the same name. This marks the first time that computer techniques are used in Dutch animation.
- October 11: Season 2 of The Simpsons begins on Fox with the premiere of the episode "Bart Gets an "F"".
- October 19: Fantasia is added to the National Film Registry.
- October 25: The Simpsons' first ever "Treehouse of Horror" special premieres on Fox.
- October 27: The Adventures of Super Mario Bros. 3 episode "Kootie Pie Rocks" airs as it features the animated versions of European boy band members Milli Vanilli, who got busted for lip-syncing nearly three weeks later. The episode from its original broadcast became coveted as the Milli Vanilli songs were replaced by generic instrumentals for subsequent reruns owing to the scandal.

=== November ===
- November 16: The Walt Disney Company releases The Rescuers Down Under, directed by Hendel Butoy and Mike Gabriel. It is the first animated Disney film to use the CAPS system, the first to fully use digital ink and paint, and the first to be produced without cameras. The same day, the film studio also releases The Prince and the Pauper by George Scribner.
- November 17: Garfield and Friends concludes its third season on CBS with the following episodes:
  - "Mistakes Will Happen/The Well Dweller/The Wise Man"
  - "Star Struck/Election Daze/Dirty Business"
- November 29: Peter in Magicland premieres.

=== December ===
- December 6: The Simpsons episode "Bart the Daredevil" is first broadcast, featuring the classic scene where Homer Simpson skateboards over a gorge. After the episode, the animated music video Do the Bartman, starring The Simpsons and co-written by Bryan Loren and Michael Jackson, is first broadcast.
- December 20: The Simpsons episode "Itchy & Scratchy & Marge" is first broadcast.

=== Specific date unknown ===
- Milan Blažeković's The Magician's Hat premieres, which is the sequel to The Elm-Chanted Forest. This is Blažeković's second film produced from Croatia Film and the only one to be released exclusively in Croatia.
- JoWonder's The Brooch Pin and the Sinful Clasp premieres.

== Films released ==
- January 1 - The Mind's Eye: A Computer Animation Odyssey (United States)
- January 3 - The Murtal Master and 108 Youkai (South Korea)
- January 16 - The Trace Leads to the Silver Lake (East Germany)
- February 3 - The Murder Ticket Is Heart-Colored (Japan)
- February 24 - Ojisan Kaizō Kōza (Japan)
- February 25 - An Idol at Will (Japan)
- March 1:
  - The Curse of Kazuo Umezu (Japan)
  - Gdleen (Japan)
- March 10:
  - Doraemon: Nobita and the Animal Planet (Japan)
  - Dragon Ball Z: The World's Strongest (Japan)
- March 21:
  - Carol: A Day in a Girl's Life (Japan)
  - Like the Clouds, Like the Wind (Japan)
- March 23 - I skog och mark (Sweden)
- March 31 - Maroko (Japan)
- April 3 - Obatarian (Japan)
- April 14 - Heavy (Japan)
- April 25 - Onimaru – Five Youths Running on the Battlefield (Japan)
- April 28 - Flight of the White Wolf (Japan)
- June 1 - How the Shoemakers Raised a War for a Red Skirt (Czechoslovakia)
- June 4 - Summer with Kuro (Japan)
- June 12 - Black Bento (Japan)
- June 23 - Gude Crest – The Emblem of Gude (Japan)
- July 6 - Jetsons: The Movie (United States)
- July 7 - Dragon Ball Z: The Tree of Might (Japan)
- July 14 - Soreike! Anpanman: Baikinman no Gyakushuu (Japan)
- July 20 - Lupin III: The Hemingway Papers (Japan)
- July 21 - Project A-Ko Versus Battle 1: Gray Side (Japan)
- July 28 - Robot Taekwon V 90 (South Korea)
- August 3 - DuckTales the Movie: Treasure of the Lost Lamp (United States)
- August 19 - The Magician's Hat (Yugoslavia)
- August 21 - Project A-Ko Versus Battle 2: Blue Side (Japan)
- August 24 - Riki-Oh 2: Child of Destruction (Japan)
- August 25:
  - City Hunter: Bay City Wars (Japan)
  - City Hunter: Million Dollar Conspiracy (Japan)
  - "Eiji" (Japan)
  - Marina the Manga Artist Goes to Camelot (Japan)
- August 26 - Soreike! Anpanman: Minami no Umi o Sukue! (Japan)
- September 14 - The Fine Feathered Friend Movie (United States)
- September 15 - Kobo-chan Special: Filled with Autumn!! (Japan)
- September 22 - Tenjōhen – Utsunomiko (Japan)
- September 28 - War of the Birds (Denmark)
- October 1 - Aries: Shinwa no Seiza Miya (Japan)
- October 17 - Dragon Ball Z: Bardock – The Father of Goku (Japan)
- November 1 - New Karate Hell Weird: Blood Apocalypse (Japan)
- November 16 - The Rescuers Down Under (United States)
- November 21 - The Nutcracker Prince (Canada) & (United States)
- November 29:
  - Peter in Magicland (Germany)
  - Werner – Beinhart! (Germany)
- December - Desperta Ferro (Spain and Germany)
- December 15 - Chibi Maruko-chan (Japan)
- December 20 - Dragon and Slippers (United States, United Kingdom, and Hungary)
- December 21 - New Karate Hell Weird: Blood War Gate (Japan)
- December 22 - A Wind Named Amnesia (Japan)
- December 28 - Sword for Truth (Japan)
- December 29 - The Adventures of Lotty (South Korea)
- Specific date unknown:
  - The Fool of the World and the Flying Ship (United Kingdom)
  - From Tale to Tale (Soviet Union)
  - Naksitrallid (Estonia)

== Television series debuts ==
Date	Title	Channel	Year
January 1	Maya the Bee	Nickelodeon	1990
September 1	Midnight Patrol: Adventures in the Dream Zone	Syndication	1990
September 1	The New Adventures of He-Man	Syndication	1990
September 3	Merrie Melodies Starring Bugs Bunny & Friends	Syndication, Fox Kids	1990–1994
September 7	TaleSpin	The Disney Channel, Syndication	1990–1991
September 8	Attack of the Killer Tomatoes	Fox Kids	1990–1991
September 8	Bobby's World	Fox Kids	1990–1998
September 8	Fox's Peter Pan & the Pirates	Fox Kids	1990–1991
September 8	Zazoo U	Fox Kids	1990
September 8	New Kids on the Block	ABC	1990
September 8	Little Rosey	ABC	1990–1991
September 8	The Wizard of Oz	ABC	1990
September 8	The Adventures of Super Mario Bros. 3	NBC	1990
September 8	Tom & Jerry Kids	Fox Kids	1990–1993
September 8	Gravedale High	NBC	1990
September 8	Kid 'n Play	NBC	1990
September 14	Tiny Toon Adventures	Syndication, Fox Kids	1990–1992
September 15	Bill & Ted's Excellent Adventures	CBS, Fox Kids	1990–1991
September 15	Captain Planet and the Planeteers	TBS	1990–1996
September 15	Piggsburg Pigs!	Fox Kids	1990
September 16	The Adventures of Don Coyote and Sancho Panda	Syndication	1990–1991
September 17	Wake, Rattle, and Roll	Syndication	1990–1991
September 29	Widget	Syndication	1990–1991
September 30	The Dreamstone	ITV, CITV	1990–1995

== Television series endings ==
Date	Title	Channel	Year	Notes
January 21	Fantastic Max	Syndication	1988–1990	Cancelled
November 19	Chip 'n Dale: Rescue Rangers	The Disney Channel, Syndication	1989–1990	Cancelled
November 24	Midnight Patrol: Adventures in the Dream Zone	Syndication	1990	Cancelled
November 28	DuckTales	Syndication	1987–1990	Ended
December 1	Alvin and the Chipmunks	NBC	1983–1990	Ended
December 1	The Adventures of Super Mario Bros. 3	NBC	1990	Cancelled
December 1	Gravedale High	NBC	1990	Cancelled
December 7	The New Adventures of He-Man	Syndication	1990	Cancelled
December 8	Zazoo U	Fox Kids	1990	Cancelled
December 8	Kid 'n Play	NBC	1990	Cancelled
December 14	New Kids on the Block	ABC	1990	Cancelled
December 15	Piggsburg Pigs!	Fox Kids	1990	Cancelled
December 28	The Wizard of Oz	ABC	1990	Cancelled

== Births ==
=== January ===
- January 4: Spencer Rothbell, American television writer (Clarence, Victor and Valentino, Twelve Forever) and voice actor (voice of Miguelito in Victor and Valentino, Colin in Twelve Forever, continued voice of the title character in Clarence).
- January 6: Natalie Palamides, American actress, comedian and writer (voice of Buttercup in The Powerpuff Girls, the Uncle Grandpa episode "Pizza Eve" and the Teen Titans Go! episode "TTG v PPG", Aunt Bitsy in Future-Worm!, Foolduke, Kitten Barrel and Snail in Star vs. the Forces of Evil, Kayla and Willow in Bob's Burgers, teen Eda Clawthorne in The Owl House, Calliope in Rapunzel's Tangled Adventure, Winnie the Werewolf in the OK K.O.! Let's Be Heroes episode "Monster Party", Teresa in the Momma Named Me Sheriff episode "Bald Boyz", Face Doll #1 and Uma Thurman in the Robot Chicken episode "May Cause Numb Butthole", Jenna in the Family Guy episode "The Lois Quagmire", Fern in the Amphibia episode "Sprivy").
- January 30: Jake Thomas, American actor and director (voice of Nigel Planter in The Grim Adventures of Billy & Mandy).

=== February ===
- February 3: Ryan Bartley, American voice actress (voice of Hanako Kamado in Demon Slayer: Kimetsu no Yaiba, Ram in Re:Zero - Starting Life in Another World, Shoko Ieiri in Jujutsu Kaisen, Rei Ayanami in the Netflix dub of Neon Genesis Evangelion, Fluff in Miraculous: Tales of Ladybug & Cat Noir).
- February 16: The Weeknd, Canadian singer-songwriter and record producer (voice of Madea in the Robot Chicken episode "Endgame", Orion Hughes and Darius Hughes in The Simpsons episode "Bart the Cool Kid", himself in the American Dad! episode "A Starboy is Born").

=== March ===
- March 1: Aaron Long, Canadian animator, filmmaker and writer (BoJack Horseman, Tuca & Bertie).
- March 4: Andrea Bowen, American actress and singer (voice of Faline in Bambi II, Moogle Girl in Final Fantasy VII: Advent Children, Sandy and Teen Girl in King of the Hill, Talia al Ghul in the Batman: The Brave and the Bold episode "Sidekicks Assemble!").
- March 30: Cassie Scerbo, American actress, singer and dancer (voice of Heidi Wienerman in Randy Cunningham: 9th Grade Ninja, Tiffany in the Sym-Bionic Titan episode "Showdown at Sherman High").
- March 31: Landon McDonald, American actor (voice of Enmu in Demon Slayer, Noritoshi Kamo in Jujutsu Kaisen, Alexei Zelenoy in Amain Warrior at the Borderline, Slobot in Power Players).

=== April ===
- April 10: Alex Pettyfer, English actor (voice of Troy in the Family Guy episode "The Movement").
- April 15: Emma Watson, English actress (voice of Princess Pea in The Tale of Despereaux).
- April 18: Britt Robertson, American actress (voice of Vex in Tangled: The Series).
- April 23: Dev Patel, English actor (voice of Yoshio in Only Yesterday, Naoufel in I Lost My Body).

=== May ===
- May 1: Kate Bristol, American actress (Funimation).
- May 3: Harvey Guillén, American actor (voice of Funny the Funhouse in Mickey Mouse Funhouse, Perrito in Puss in Boots: The Last Wish, Nightwing in Harley Quinn, Alton in Archer, José and Brett in Human Resources, Gabo in Wish, Odie in The Garfield Movie, Angmar in The Owl House episode "Through the Looking Glass Ruins", Henrique in The Casagrandes episode "The Bros in the Band", additional voices in Teenage Euthanasia).
- May 13: Monica Ray, American actress (voice of Wade in Harvey Beaks, Kiki in Big City Greens, Miko Kubota in Glitch Techs).
- May 16:
  - Thomas Brodie-Sangster, English actor (voice of Ferb Fletcher in Phineas and Ferb, John Tracy in Thunderbirds Are Go).
  - Marc John Jefferies, American actor (voice of young Green Lantern in the Justice League Unlimited episode "Kid Stuff").
- May 17: Ross Butler, American actor (voice of Spine Leader in Raya and the Last Dragon, Limo in Flavors of Youth).
- May 31: Phillipa Soo, American actress and singer (voice of Chang'e in Over the Moon, additional voices in Moana).

=== June ===
- June 15: Denzel Whitaker, American actor (voice of Albert in The Ant Bully, Jake in the What's New, Scooby-Doo? episode "Camp Comeoniwannascareya", Kyle in the Handy Manny episode "Join the Club", Sergeant Gutter in The Boondocks episode "Bitches to Rags").
- June 19: Ashly Burch, American voice actress and singer (voice of Enid Mettle in OK K.O.! Let's Be Heroes, Molly McGee in The Ghost and Molly McGee, Rutile Twins in Steven Universe, Sasha Braus in Attack on Titan, Ash Graven in Final Space), and writer (Adventure Time).
- June 21: Sean Chiplock, American voice actor (voice of Metal Lee in Boruto, Subaro Natsuki in Re:Zero, Ken Ryuguji in Tokyo Revengers, Kinger in The Amazing Digital Circus).

=== July ===
- July 6: Jeremy Suarez, American actor (voice of Koda in Brother Bear and Brother Bear 2, Tippy in The Land Before Time VIII: The Big Freeze, Russell in Fat Albert, Kai in Zambezia, Wally in The Proud Family Movie, Nuebert in the Max Steel episode "Fun in the Sun", Scared Boy in the Hey Arnold! episode "The Journal").
- July 12: Rachel Brosnahan, American actress (voice of Wendy Beckett in Spies in Disguise, Chloe in Elena of Avalor).
- July 19: Jeannie Tirado, American voice actress (voice of Zera in Fairy Tail Zero, Leila Malcal in Code Geass: Akito the Exiled, Kaga in KanColle: Kantai, Norman in The Promised Neverland, Riko in Love Live! Sunshine!!, Pan in Dragon Ball Super, Jessica Cruz in Justice League x RWBY: Super Heroes & Huntsmen).
- July 20: Iris Menas, American actor (voice of Odee Eliot in Madagascar: A Little Wild, Fred in Ridley Jones, Frankie Stein in Monster High).
- July 24: Daveigh Chase, American actress, singer and model (voice of Lilo Pelekai in the Lilo & Stitch franchise, Joyce Summit and Tracy Manbini in Fillmore!, Betsy in Betsy's Kindergarten Adventures, English dub voice of Chihiro Ogino in Spirited Away), (d. 2026).

=== August ===
- August 2: Saki Nitta, Japanese voice actress (voice of Pakuri in Kill la Kill, Bridget Faye and Cache Dop in D.Gray-man Hallow, dub voice of Dogo in The Lion Guard, Bullied Sheep in Zootopia, and Rosa Rivera in Coco), (d. 2022).
- August 9: Emily Tennant, Canadian actress (voice of Ghost Spider in Marvel Super Hero Adventures, the title character in Polly Pocket, Mary Test in Johnny Test, Mane Allgood in the My Little Pony: Friendship is Magic episode "The Last Crusade").
- August 23: Wesley Singerman, American guitarist, record producer, songwriter and former child actor (voice of Lars in The Little Polar Bear, Charlie Brown in A Charlie Brown Valentine, Charlie Brown's Christmas Tales and Lucy Must Be Traded, Charlie Brown, Wilbur Robinson in Meet the Robinsons).
- August 29: Erika Harlacher, American voice actress (voice of Sasha in Sword Art Online, Elizabeth Liones in The Seven Deadly Sins, Ann Takamaki in Persona 5: The Animation, Hailey Ann Thomas in Yo-Kai Watch, Ondine in Miraculous: Tales of Ladybug & Cat Noir, Sailor Star Maker in Sailor Moon).

=== September ===
- September 5: Max Mittelman, American voice actor (voice of Saitama in One-Punch Man, Kousei Arima in Your Lie in April, Hikari Sakishima in Nagi-Asu: A Lull in the Sea, Kin in The Seven Deadly Sins, Ritsu Kageyama in Mob Psycho 100, Inaho Kaizuka in Aldnoah.Zero, Atsushi Nakajima in Bungo Stray Dogs, Nacht Faust in Black Clover, Meruem in Hunter x Hunter, Hisamitsu Noto in Toradora!, Plagg in Miraculous: Tales of Ladybug & Cat Noir, Jimmy Olsen in Justice League Action, Overflow in Ben 10, Lion-O and Wilykat in ThunderCats Roar, Cheshire Cat in Alice's Wonderland Bakery, Lex Luthor in My Adventures with Superman).

=== October ===
- October 4: Arryn Zech, American voice actress (voice of Blake Belladonna in RWBY, Dr. Emily Grey in Red vs. Blue).
- October 15: Michael Cusack, Australian voice actor, photographer, animator, storyboard artist writer and director (co-creator and voice of Pim, Alan and other various characters in Smiling Friends, creator of YOLO and Koala Man).
- October 18: Hamish Steele, British animation director, comic-book artist and writer (creator of Dead End: Paranormal Park).

=== November ===
- November 6: Bowen Yang, Australian-American actor, comedian, and writer (voice of Ronnie in Night at the Museum: Kahmunrah Rises Again, Win Li in the Archer episode "Bloodsploosh", Lonnie in HouseBroken episode "Who's a Homeowner", Richard in The Simpsons episode "Homer's Adventures Through the Windshield Glass", Celestrial Administrator in Gremlins: Secrets of the Mogwai, Dragon King in The Monkey King, Sidney in The Tiger's Apprentice).
- November 13: Kathleen Herles, American voice actress (voice of Dora in Dora the Explorer and Go, Diego, Go!).
- November 24: Sarah Hyland, American actress (voice of Tiifu in The Lion Guard, Batgirl in Lego DC Comics Super Heroes: Justice League – Gotham City Breakout).
- November 25: Stephanie Hsu, American actress (voice of Zhen in Kung Fu Panda: The Dragon Knight, Mayor's Wife in The Monkey King, Ise in Blue Eye Samurai, Skyler's mom in Leo, Golden Glider in Kite Man: Hell Yeah!).
- November 26: Rita Ora, English singer and songwriter (voice of Luthera / Wandering Blade in Kung Fu Panda: The Dragon Knight).
- November 27: Shane Haboucha, American actor (voice of Billy Batson and young Superman in Justice League Unlimited, Robin in Justice League: The New Frontier).

=== December ===
- December 8: Dana Terrace, American animator, writer, producer, and storyboard artist (Gravity Falls, creator of and voice of Tiny Nose in The Owl House, co-creator of Knights of Guinevere).
- December 9: SungWon Cho, American YouTuber and actor (voice of Mordicai in Lackadaisy, Abby Saja in KPop Demon Hunters, "The Blur" in Craig of the Creek, Kage in Ranking of Kings, Nekomamushi in One Piece, Badcomputer and the Riddler in Batwheels, Sidian in Pokémon Horizons: The Series, Sagwan in Beastars, Senshi in Delicious in Dungeon, Hyodo in Aggretsuko, Left Lion, Right Lion, and Maz in Jentry Chau vs. the Underworld, Orville Park in Knights of Guinevere, General Hyles in the Moon Girl and Devil Dinosaur episode "Dancing With Myself", Little Rok in the Jellystone episode "Collection Protection").
- December 29: Nathaniel Curtis, British actor (voice of Dolph Laserhawk in Captain Laserhawk: A Blood Dragon Remix).

== Deaths ==
=== January ===
- January 2: Alan Hale Jr., American actor (voice of Skipper in The New Adventures of Gilligan and Gilligan's Planet), dies at age 68.
- January 8: Terry-Thomas, English actor and comedian (voice of Sir Hiss in Robin Hood), dies at age 78.
- January 19: Tommy Luske, American actor (voice of Michael Darling in Peter Pan), dies at age 42.
- January 24: Gerry Johnson, American actress (voice of Betty Rubble in the final two seasons of The Flintstones), dies at age 71.

=== February ===
- February 16: Tadanari Okamoto, Japanese animated film director and producer (Echo Incorporated), dies at age 58.

=== March ===
- March 18: Robin Harris, American comedian and actor (Bebe's Kids), dies from a heart attack at age 36.

=== April ===
- April 7: Dick Lundy, American animator and film director and producer (Walt Disney Company, MGM, Walter Lantz, Hanna-Barbera, co-creator of Donald Duck), dies at age 82.

=== May ===
- May 2: David Rappaport, English actor (voice of MAL in Captain Planet and the Planeteers), commits suicide at age 38.
- May 16:
  - Jim Henson, American puppeteer and animator (Sesame Street, Muppet Babies, Little Muppet Monsters), dies at age 53.
  - Sammy Davis Jr., American singer, dancer, actor, comedian film producer and television director (voice of Cheshire Cat in The New Alice in Wonderland, Head Ratte in Heidi's Song), dies at age 64.
- May 25: Vic Tayback, American actor (voice of Carface in All Dogs Go to Heaven), dies at age 60.
- May 31: William Timym, Austrian-English animator and comics artist (Bleep and Booster and Bengo the Boxer), dies at age 87.

=== June ===
- June 21: Margaret J. Winkler, American animation producer and film distributor, credited as the first woman to produce and distribute animated films, (Pat Sullivan, Fleischer Brothers, Walt Disney, founder of Screen Gems) and wife of Charles Mintz, dies at age 95.

=== July ===
- July 17:
  - George Waiss, American animator and comics artist (Walter Lantz, Walt Disney Company, Warner Bros. Cartoons, Fleischer Brothers, Fine Arts Films, Filmation), dies at age 83.
  - Bernard Cowan, Canadian actor (voice of Bumble, Spotted Elephant, and Clarice's Father in Rudolph the Red-Nosed Reindeer, narrator in Spider-Man, The Marvel Super Heroes, and Rocket Robin Hood), dies at age 68.
- July 25: Nikolai Prilutskiy, Soviet and Russian sound operator and director of audiography, worked primarily in Soviet animated sound films (The Snow Maiden, The Enchanted Boy, The Twelve Months, The Snow Queen), dies at age 81.

=== August ===
- August 17: Pearl Bailey, American actress and singer (voice of Mrs. Elephant in Tubby the Tuba, Big Mama in The Fox and the Hound), dies at age 72.
- August 26: Retta Scott, American artist (Walt Disney Animation Studios), dies at age 74.

=== September ===
- September 5: Jerry Iger, American animator (Fleischer Studios) and comics publisher, dies at age 87.
- September 13: Joaquin Garay, Mexican actor (voice of Panchito Pistoles in The Three Caballeros), dies at age 78.

=== October ===
- October 7: Grim Natwick, American animator and film director (Fleischer Studios, designed Betty Boop, worked for Ub Iwerks, Walter Lantz, Walt Disney Animation Studios, UPA, Richard Williams), dies at age 100.

=== November ===
- November 4: Hicks Lokey, American animator (Fleischer Studios, Walter Lantz, Walt Disney Studios, Hanna-Barbera), dies at age 86.
- November 12: Dave Willock, American actor (narrator in Wacky Races, voice of Augustus "Gus" Holiday in The Roman Holidays), dies at age 81.
- November 19: Nicholas Tafuri, American animator (Fleischer Studios, Famous Studios, Ralph Bakshi), dies at age 77.
- November 24: Dodie Smith, English novelist and playwright, (her children's novel The Hundred and One Dalmatians was adapted into the animated film One Hundred and One Dalmatians), dies at age 94.

=== December ===
- December 18: Connie Russell, American singer and actress (singing voice of Red in "Red Hot Riding Hood"), dies at age 67.
- December 21: Susi Weigel, Austrian illustrator, comics artist and animator, dies at age 76.
- December 23: Serge Danot, French animator and film director and producer (The Magic Roundabout), dies at age 59.
- December 27: Helene Stanley, American actress (model for Cinderella in Cinderella, Aurora in Sleeping Beauty, and Anita Radcliffe in One Hundred and One Dalmatians), dies at age 61.

== See also ==
- 1990 in anime
