= 1990 in anime =

The events of 1990 in anime.

== Accolades ==
- Animation Film Award: Hashire! Shiroi Ōkami

== Releases ==
Released	Title	Type	Director	Studio	Ref
January 4	Umi Da! Funade Da! Nikoniko, Pun	Film	Toshio Hirata	Oh! Production	
January 7	Chibi Maruko-chan	TV series	Yumiko Suda; Tsutomu Shibayama	Nippon Animation	
January 14	My Daddy Long Legs	TV series	Kazuyoshi Yokota	Nippon Animation	
January 26	Be-Bop High School	OVA series	Toshihiko Arisako; Hiroyuki Kakudō; Junichi Fujise	Toei Animation	
January 26	Ankoku Shinwa	OVA series	Takashi Anno	Ajia-do Animation Works	
February 1	Nadia: The Secret of Blue Water	TV series	Hideaki Anno	Gainax	
February 3	Brave Exkaiser	TV series	Katsuyoshi Yatabe	Sunrise	
February 23	1+2=Paradise	OVA series	Junichi Watanabe	J.C.Staff	
February 24	Ojisan Kaizō Kōza	Film	Tsutomu Shibayama	Tokyo Movie Shinsha	
March	Fujiko F. Fujio's SF (Slightly Mysterious) Short Theater	OVA series	Hiroshi Sasagawa; Hidetoshi Owashi; Yoshihiro Takamoto; Satoshi Dezaki; Tomomi Mochizuki; Tsuneo Tominaga	Gallop; Magic Bus; Animation 21	
March 1	Gdleen	OVA	Takao Kato; Toyoo Ashida	Ashi Productions	
March 1	The Curse of Kazuo Umezu	OVA	Naoko Omi	Takahashi Studio	
March 3	Mashin Hero Wataru 2	TV series	Shuji Iuchi	Sunrise	
March 10	Chinpui: Eri-sama Katsudō Daishashin	Film	Mitsuru Hongo	Shin-Ei Animation	
March 10	Doraemon: Nobita and the Animal Planet	Film	Tsutomu Shibayama	Shin-Ei Animation	
March 10	Dragon Ball Z: The World's Strongest	Film	Daisuke Nishio	Toei Animation	
March 21	Carol: A Day in a Girl's Life	OVA	Tetsu Dezaki; Tsuneo Tominaga	Magic Bus	
March 21	Like the Clouds, Like the Wind	TV film	Hisayuki Toriumi	Pierrot	
March 21	Sol Bianca	OVA	Katsuhito Akiyama; Hiroki Hayashi	AIC	
March 23	Guardian of Darkness	OVA series	Osamu Yamazaki	J.C.Staff	
March 24	Tistou, the Boy with Green Thumbs	Film	Yuji Tanno	Production I.G	
April 3	Obatarian	TV special	Tetsurō Amino	Sunrise	
April 5	Taiman Blues: Ladies-hen - Mayumi	OVA series	Tetsu Dezaki	Magic Bus	
April 6	NG Knight Ramune & 40	TV series	Hiroshi Negishi	TV Tokyo	
April 12	Moomin	TV series	Hiroshi Saitô; Masayuki Kojima	Telecable Benelux B.V. Telescreen Japan Inc. Visual 80	
April 13	Samurai Pizza Cats	TV series	Kunitoshi Okajima	Tatsunoko Production	
April 25	Burning Blood	OVA series	Osamu Dezaki	Magic Bus	
April 25	I am THE Reiko Shiratori!	OVA	Mitsuru Hongo	Ajia-do Animation Works	
April 28	Flight of the White Wolf	Film	Yosei Maeda	Group TAC	
May 25	AD Police Files	OVA series	Takamasa Ikegami; Akira Nishimori	Artmic; AIC	
May 25	Yagami-kun's Family Affairs	OVA series	Shin'ya Sadamitsu	Kitty Film Mitaka Studio	
June 4	Summer with Kuro	Film	Takeshi Shirato	GEN Productions	
June 12	Black Bento	Film	Tetsu Dezaki	Kyodo Eiga	
June 23	Gude Crest – The Emblem of Gude	Film	Kazuhito Kikuchi	J.C.Staff	
June 23	Milky Passion: Dougenzaka - Ai no Shiro	OVA	Takashi Imanishi	Animation 501; Continental Shobo	
June 29	Heisei no Cinderella: Kiko-sama Monogatari	TV special		Studio Comet	
June 30	Record of Lodoss War	OVA series	Akinori Nagaoka	Madhouse	
July 3	Fujiko Fujio A no Mumako	TV special	Toshirō Kuni	Shin-Ei Animation	
July 7	Dragon Ball Z: The Tree of Might	Film	Daisuke Nishio	Toei Animation	
July 7	Kennosuke-sama	Film	Minoru Okazaki	Toei Animation	
July 7	Pink: Water Bandit, Rain Bandit	Film	Toyoo Ashida	Toei Animation	
July 14	Soreike! Anpanman: Baikinman no Gyakushuu	Film	Akinori Nagaoka	Tokyo Movie Shinsha	
July 20	Lupin III: The Hemingway Papers	TV special	Osamu Dezaki	Tokyo Movie Shinsha	
July 21	Hello Kitty's Thumbelina	Film	Hidemi Kubo	Sanrio; Grouper Productions	
July 21	Keroppi's Big Adventure with Jack and the Beanstalk	Film	Masami Hata	Sanrio; Grouper Productions	
July 21	Kim's Cross	Film	Tengo Yamada	Tatsunoko Production	
July 21	Pokopon's Funny Monkey Story	Film	Masami Hata	Sanrio; Grouper Productions	
July 21	Transformers: Zone	OVA	Hiromichi Matano	Toei Animation	
July 27	Nineteen 19	OVA	Koichi Chigira	Madhouse	
August 24	Riki-Oh 2: Child of Destruction	OVA	Tetsu Dezaki	Magic Bus	
August 25	City Hunter: Bay City Wars	Film	Kenji Kodama	Sunrise	
August 25	City Hunter: Million Dollar Conspiracy	Film	Kenji Kodama	Sunrise	
August 25	"Eiji"	Film	Mizuho Nishikubo	I.G Tatsunoko	
August 26	Soreike! Anpanman: Minami no Umi o Sukue!	TV special	Shunji Ōga	Tokyo Movie Shinsha	
September 1	OL Kaizo Koza	Film	Hajime Kamegaki	Tokyo Movie Shinsha	
September 2	Magical Tarurūto-kun	TV series	Masahiko Ohkura	Toei Animation	
October 1	Aries: Shinwa no Seiza Miya	OVA	Mitsuo Kusakabe	Studio Sign	
October 3	Musashi, the Samurai Lord	TV series	Akira Shigino	Pierrot	
October 6	RPG Densetsu Hepoi	TV series		Nihon Ad Systems	
October 10	The Three-Eyed One	TV series	Hidehito Ueda	Tezuka Productions	
October 12	Sunset on Third Street	TV series	Hidehito Ueda	Group TAC	
October 17	Dragon Ball Z: Bardock – The Father of Goku	TV special	Mitsuo Hashimoto	Toei Animation	
October 21	Osu!! Karate Bu	OVA series	Osamu Sekida	J.C.Staff	
October 25	The Hakkenden	OVA series	Takashi Anno	AIC; Artmic	
November 17	Ajin Senshi	Film	Tsuneo Tominaga	Magic Bus	
December 1	Devil Hunter Yohko	OVA series	Katsuhisa Yamada	Madhouse	
December 8	In the Summer After the War: 1945 Karafuto	Film	Koji Chino		
December 15	Chibi Maruko-chan	Film	Yumiko Suda; Tsutomu Shibayama	Nippon Animation	
December 21	Circuit no Ōkami II: Modena no Tsurugi	OVA	Yoshihide Kuriyama	Gainax	
December 21	Mad Bull 34	OVA series	Satoshi Dezaki	Magic Bus	
December 22	A Wind Named Amnesia	Film	Kazuo Yamazaki	Madhouse	
December 28	Sword for Truth	OVA	Osamu Dezaki	Toei Animation	
	Kounai Shasei				

== See also ==
- 1990 in animation
