= Bengo =

Bengo may refer to

- Bengo (province), Angola
- Bengo (municipality) (Ícolo e Bengo), Angola
- Bengo the Boxer puppy, a 1950s cartoon by William Timym
