= Just Peck =

- Directed by: Michael A. Nickles
- Written by: Marc Arneson
- Produced by: Jerry Leider
- Starring: Keir Gilchrist; Brie Larson; Marcia Cross
- Cinematography: Mark Petersen
- Edited by: Ellen Goldwasser
- Music by: Benjamin Wynn; Jeremy Zuckerman
- Release date: May 14, 2009 (Cannes Film Festival)
- Running time: 90 minutes
- Country: United States
- Language: English

Just Peck is a 2009 American comedy film directed by Michael A. Nickles and written by Marc Arneson.

== Plot ==
A skinny high school sophomore dreams up a science project that will make him a living legend, and win him the heart of a pretty senior who sees his true potential. Michael Peck is the kid nobody sees while he's walking down the hall. But when popular senior Emily takes a liking to Michael, he starts to become a little less invisible. Meanwhile, Michael's well meaning yet misguided parents pressure him to enter the upcoming science fair – an event that could land him right back in the land of misfits. With his newfound popularity hanging precariously in the balance, the smart and stealthy teen dreams up a science project that will turn heads, and teach his parents a valuable lesson.

== Cast ==
- Keir Gilchrist as Michael Peck
- Brie Larson as Emily Donaldson
- Marcia Cross as Cheryl Peck
- Adam Arkin as Mike Peck
- Camryn Manheim as Principal Wood
- Kyle Kaplan as Geiger
- Tiya Sircar as Becca
- Hayley Holmes as Annie
- Serena Berman as Sage

== Release ==
Arneson wrote the screenplay when he was a student at UCLA.

The film was picked up by American World Pictures and premiered at the 2009 Cannes Film Festival.
