= Jessica D. Stone =

American actress

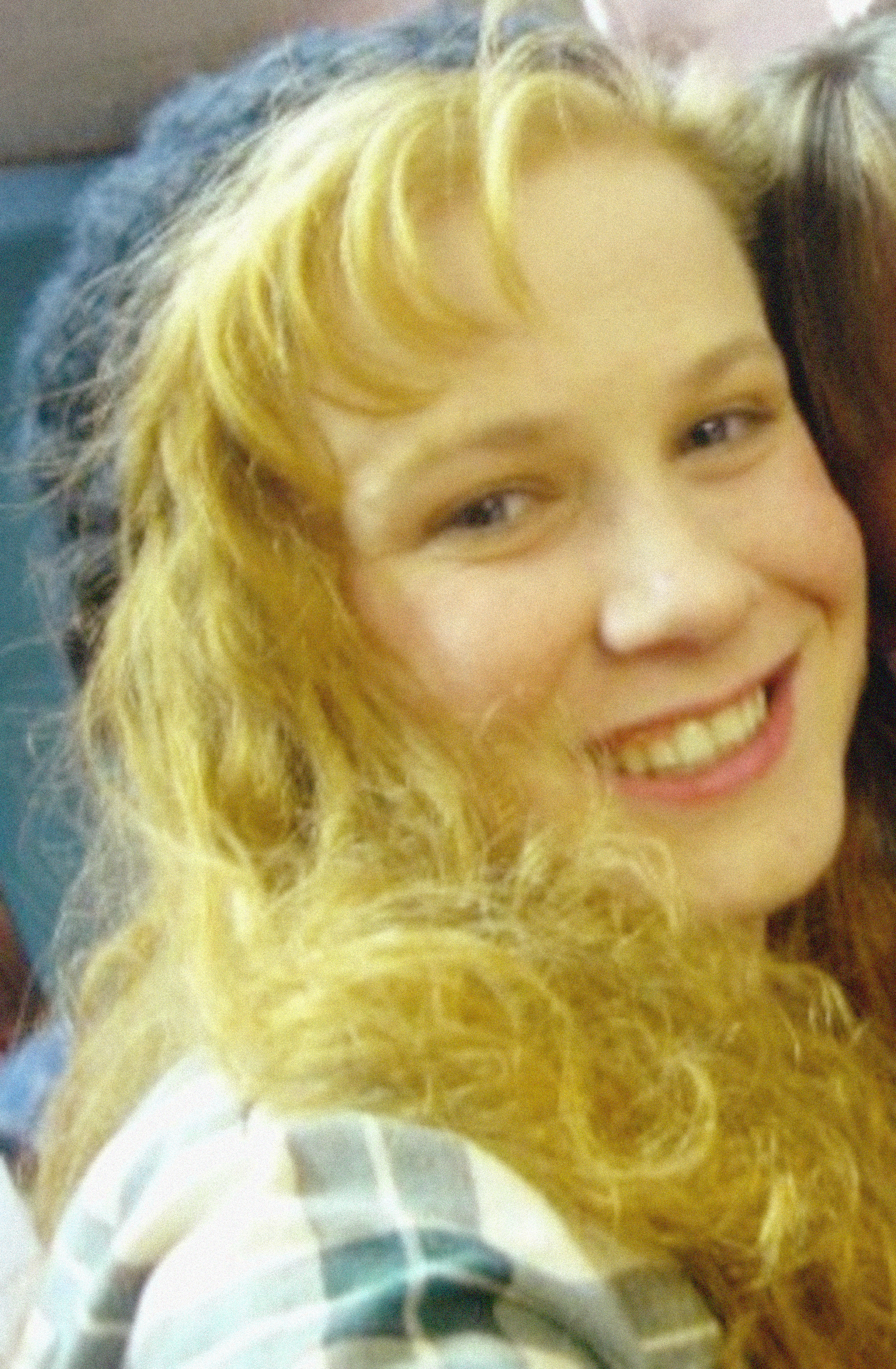
- Stone at the Knightsbridge Theatre in 2008
- Born: Jessica Danielle Stone; January 29, 1990 (age 36); Valencia, California
- Occupation: Actress
- Years active: 1999–present

Jessica Danielle Stone is an American actress whose roles include Young Brenda Chenowith in the acclaimed HBO series, Six Feet Under, created by Alan Ball, Narra in Star Trek: Enterprise, and the voice of Stanley Griff in the 2001 Playhouse Disney animated series, Stanley. She has worked extensively in anime and video games, namely Hellsing Ultimate, providing the voice of Young Walter C. Dornez, as well as Makoto in the Capcom Street Fighter franchise.

Her work has been further seen in Los Angeles repertory theatre. In 2008, she starred as Clarisse McClellan in Ray Bradbury's Pandemonium Theatre Company production of Fahrenheit 451, directed by Alan Neal Hubbs and performed at the Fremont Centre Theatre. In 2012, she portrayed Penny Pingleton in the period musical Hairspray at the High Street Arts Center in Moorpark, for which she won Outstanding Featured Performance by the Annual Four Star Theater Alliance Awards in January 2013. She was cast as Honey, a major supporting character in the play, Who's Afraid of Virginia Woolf? in the Ojai Art Center 2015 production, where she won her second Four Star Theater Alliance award for Outstanding Featured Performance in January 2016. (Note: VC Reporter, 2016. "Local theatre celebrated its own at the Four Star Theater Awards held at the High Street Arts Center in Moorpark on January 10. The gala event was hosted by the Four Star Theater Alliance, made up of Camarillo Skyway Playhouse, Conejo Players Theatre, Elite Theatre Company, High Street Arts Center, Ojai Art Center Theater (Ojai ACT) and Santa Paula Theater Center. [...] Outstanding Featured Performances at Ojai ACT went to Cecil Sutton for Dancing at Lughnasa and Jessica Stone for Who's Afraid of Virginia Woolf.") She continues to work in animation and splits her time as an acting coach at the Vibe Performing Arts School, teaching acting, voice over, and musical theatre.

== Early life ==
Stone was born to Suzy Illson and Bill Stone in Valencia, California (later relocating to Santa Clarita and Agua Dulce). (Note: PR Newswire, 2006. "Jessica Stone, Agua Dulce, Calif., was the winner in the Young Champion category. [...] She volunteers at diabetes camps, is an accomplished singer and actress and voices the Disney Channel character 'Stanley' in the children's animated series.") When she was 9 years old, she was diagnosed with type 1 diabetes and participated in the American Walk for Diabetes in Santa Clarita, California in 2003. She also volunteered her time at diabetes camps during the summer, programs which were established to help teens build peer groups and manage their symptoms through educational resources. "I spent three days in the hospital [at one point]," she recalled, "and I learned how to give myself shots. Then I went back to a normal life. Well, kind of." On September 6, 2006 at an Indianapolis awards banquet held by Eli Lilly and Company, she was granted a LillyforLife Achievement Award in the Young Champion category for her contributions to the diabetic community.

Although she had appeared in commercial work for television as a toddler as her older brother had been a working child actor at the time, Stone first expressed her interest in professional acting when she 4 when her brother announced to his family that he was retiring from the business. She received musical training at the Vibe Performing Arts School in Santa Clarita, juggled work on sets with schoolwork, and was home schooled for most of her high school education. During the summer, she honed her skills at teen drama camps in Santa Clarita and North Hollywood, including the Canyon Theatre Guild S.T.A.R.S. workshops (Note: The Signal, 2003. "CTG cast member Lisa Tenario, right, rehearses with Jessica Stone, left, in a scene from the CTG Kids workshop production of 'A Midsummer Night's Dream' .") and the Showdown Theatre Academy/Showdown Stage Company's Theatre Camps taught by Cindy Marcus and Flip Kobler. Showdown staged a number of original productions, notably Nottingham: A Totally Teen Musical, which premiered at the Repertory East Playhouse in August 2005 and re-opened at The Hub Theatre in Noho in 2007, and Brother's Grimm Out of Order, also at the Repertory East Playhouse in December 2005. She graduated from College of the Canyons in 2011 with a Bachelor of Arts degree in Liberal Arts and Performing Arts.

== Career ==
=== 1999–2003: Theatre, indie films and television ===
Stone made her debut in repertory theatre in Christopher Sergel's dramatic adaptation of the Harper Lee classic of racial tensions set in the backdrop of 1930s Alabama, To Kill a Mockingbird, playing Scout Finch with Leslie Marshall portraying her adult version. The play was directed by Roxanne Barker, presented by the National American Shakespeare Company and staged at the Knightsbridge Theatre in Pasadena, California during the 2000-2001 fall season. The play was received poorly by critic Dany Margolies in a scathing review for Backstage, noting the cast indicated their characters' emotions, and panned the overall direction. "Barker could trust her actors and her audience more in the acting department," he concluded.

She had a guest appearance on Knots Landing: Back to the Culd-de-Sac as Molly Whittaker in 1997, a supporting part as Alicia Geiger (the adopted daughter of Dr. Jeffrey Geiger played by Mandy Patinkin), diagnosed with a fatal heart murmur in the final season of Chicago Hope on CBS in 1999, and was featured as Chrissy, Ruthie Camden (Mackenzie Rosman)'s school friend who plagiarizes her story for a class competition in Season 4, Episode 20: "Liar, Liar" in 2000. At 11, she was cast in a recurring role as Young Brenda Chenowith (the adult version portrayed by Rachel Griffiths) in Six Feet Under. Her debut appearance was in Episode 5 of Season 1, written by Alan Ball and directed by Kathy Bates, which aired on 1 July 2001 on the HBO network. She would go on to appear in Episode 6, scripted by Christian Taylor and directed by Rodrigo Garcia, and reprised her role in Season 2, Episode 11, written by Rick Cleveland and directed by Miguel Arteta, which aired on 12 May 2002. As a troubled woman, the show delves into glimpses of Brenda's past and how she was mistreated by her parents in childhood who were sexually open with their children.

The same year, Stone appeared in a lead role as Dustine "Dusty" Murphy, a snarky 7-year-old living with her stepmother in a rundown trailer park, in the indie LGBT black comedy, Play Dead, written and directed by Jeff Jenkins. The film follows Dustine and her gay teenage babysitter, Dale (played by Nathan Bexton) who get mixed up in disposing of a body. The film was submitted in January for competition at the Slamdance Film Festival in Park City, Utah, which was attended by the cast. It was also screened at the New York Lesbian and Gay Film Festival in May, the Reeling: The Chicago LGBTQ+ International Film Festival in July 2002, and the Music Box which Stone attended. Reviews were generally unfavorable. Writing for Film Threat, Mariko McDonald was mixed. She praised some of the cast, though noted that only the first half held her interest. Scott Foundas of Variety was also largely negative and Ted Shen of Chicago Reader called the film "tasteless lunacy."

Then, at the age of 11, she landed the lead as the voice of Stanley Griff, a 6-year-old boy with a unique interest in learning about animals, in the Disney animated series, Stanley co-starring Charles Shaughnessy as his best friend (a talking goldfish), Dennis. The cartoon premiered on the Playhouse Disney block in September 2001. The show was interactive and educational, aimed at toddlers to 7-year-olds, and produced by Doug creator Jim Jinkins, which was based on a children's book series of the same name. It was renewed for two more seasons. She would reprise the role in the Disney Online game, Playhouse Disney Preschool Time Online, released to public libraries in the summer of 2006 and marketed to investors at the American Library Association (ALA) Conference in New Orleans in June.

She appeared as Sydney in the short film, Wheels Locked, directed by Dave Bergeson, which was filmed in an abandoned hospital at March Air Force Base in Redlands, California. The film was submitted to various festivals, including the Best Shorts Competition, the Fargo Film Festival, the Rhode Island International Film Festival, the Granada Theater in Dallas, Texas, and the Rochester International Film Festival.

Stone also lent her voice to Marcie in the ABC holiday special, A Charlie Brown Valentine, which Variety noted was largely faithful to Charles M. Schulz's original creation. She then guest starred as Narra, Dennis Christopher's daughter in Season 1, Episode 21 of Star Trek:Enterprise, directed by David Livingston and broadcast on UPN in April 2002. The episode was received with generally favorable reviews, notably by critics Jamahl Epsicokhan and Keith R. A. DeCandido, though the latter felt cheated by the episode's ending when it decided not to confirm if any of the escapees survived after their climatic prison break.

She then appeared as Whimsy, a little girl whose uncle is accidentally killed in a hit-and-run accident in the short film, The Migration of Clouds, directed by Patrick Scott in his debut while he was studying filmmaking at the California Institute of the Arts. The project was screened at the Sundance Film Festival in January 2002. Tim Merrill reviewing for Film Threat was mixed, writing that he was unable to make much sense of the story, though it was received positively at other screenings.

Stone was featured in The Butterfingers Angel, Mary & Joseph, Herod the Nut, & The Slaughter of 12 Hit Carols in a Pear Tree, directed by Michael Kosik at the Santa Clarita Repertory Theatre in November 2002 with Rachel Hirschfeld and Ian McQuown. She expanded her voice acting into anime, lending her voice to Midori the Racoon dog in New Generation Pictures' English dub of Angel Tales, ADR directed by Reiko Matsuo and produced by Jonathan Klein, and the orphan angel from the "Abandoned Factory," Dai in Haibane Renmei, a slice-of-life fantasy based on the manga by Yoshitoshi Abe. Produced by Reiko Matsuo and adapted by Jonathan Klein and Taliesin Jaffe, the series was released on DVD by Geneon USA in 2003. Anime News Network's Theron Martin received the English dub positively, though Zac Bertschy of the same publication criticized the "poor acting and line delivery on a few of the children [actors]."

Stone also portrayed Louisa von Trapp (alternating with Kia Atsales) in the Canyon Theatre Guild's The Sound of Music, directed by TimBen Boydston, which was performed from May through June 2003. Margie Anne Clark of The Signal highlighted the child actors as "a talented troupe of young people." In October 2003, she appeared as Miss Mistletoe in the opening sequence of the Christmas holiday film, A Light in the Forest: The Legend of Holly Boy, directed by John Carol Beuchler and loosely adapted from the 1988 children's book by Frank Latino.

=== 2004–2009: Anime dubs and musical revivals ===
When she was 14, Stone was cast in New Generation Pictures' English adaptation of R.O.D the TV, created by Hideyuki Kurata, directed by Koji Masunari for J.C. Staff and ADR directed by Taliesin Jaffe with Jonathan Klein serving as producer. In the show, Stone plays an English 12-year-old boy, Junior (a.k.a. Special Agent J), who works as a field agent and trained gunslinger assassin, inheriting the supernatural power of intangibility from his missing mother. Though the English dub was received favorably by Way Jeng for his online publication, Mania, he expressed that he was less impressed with Stone's vocal performance, saying that she didn't especially stand out and was "satisfactory with no exceptional strengths or weaknesses." Critiquing the later episodes, his opinion was more or less the same, noting that Stone was "somewhere between fair and good." Despite these criticisms, the series was given a Dub of the Year honor by Dub Review's Anime Dub Recognition (ADR) Awards in early 2005.

At 16, Stone appeared as Little Sally in the Actors' Repertory Theatre of Simi's revival of Urinetown, directed by Greg Zerkle and which opened at the Simi Valley Cultural Arts Center in June 2006. Rita Moran, reviewing the show for the Ventura County Star was positive, writing that Stone's Sally was "firmly planted in reality." The same year, she provided the English voice for Shoukichi Hitotsubashi, the moody younger brother of the kami heroine, Yurie in Hideyuki Kurata and Koji Masunari's Kamichu!, animated by Bésame Mucho and ADR directed by Patrick Seitz for New Generation Pictures. The overall dub was positively received. ANN believed that New Generation Pictures was faithful to the original version, adding that the cast nailed their lines.

In 2007, Stone played Parker in the ensemble production of Carter W. Lewis' play, Picasso Does My Maps, which was directed by Lisa Guzman, produced by the Vox Humana Company and staged at the Pico Playhouse. The Los Angeles Times named the production "ambitious" and that Parker was "an eerily perspicacious orphan."

In 2008, she was cast in Alan Neal Hubbs' stage adaptation of Ray Bradbury's Fahrenheit 451, produced by Bradbury's Pandemonium Theatre Company. The play premiered at the Fremont Centre Theatre in April, which was scheduled to close in May. However, it was extended through June and August and was re-staged in October through November. It was extended once more through December. Most of the original cast returned. The production was generally well-received. Stone played the supporting role of 17-year-old Clarisse McClellen with David Polcyn interpreting the lead, fireman Guy Montag who is challenged by Clarisse's rebellious worldview (Montag was alternated by David Mauer and Lee Holmes in the extended run). According to Roses Prichard, one of the cast members in an interview with the Los Angeles Journal, she said that Stone was selected for the part at an open casting call.

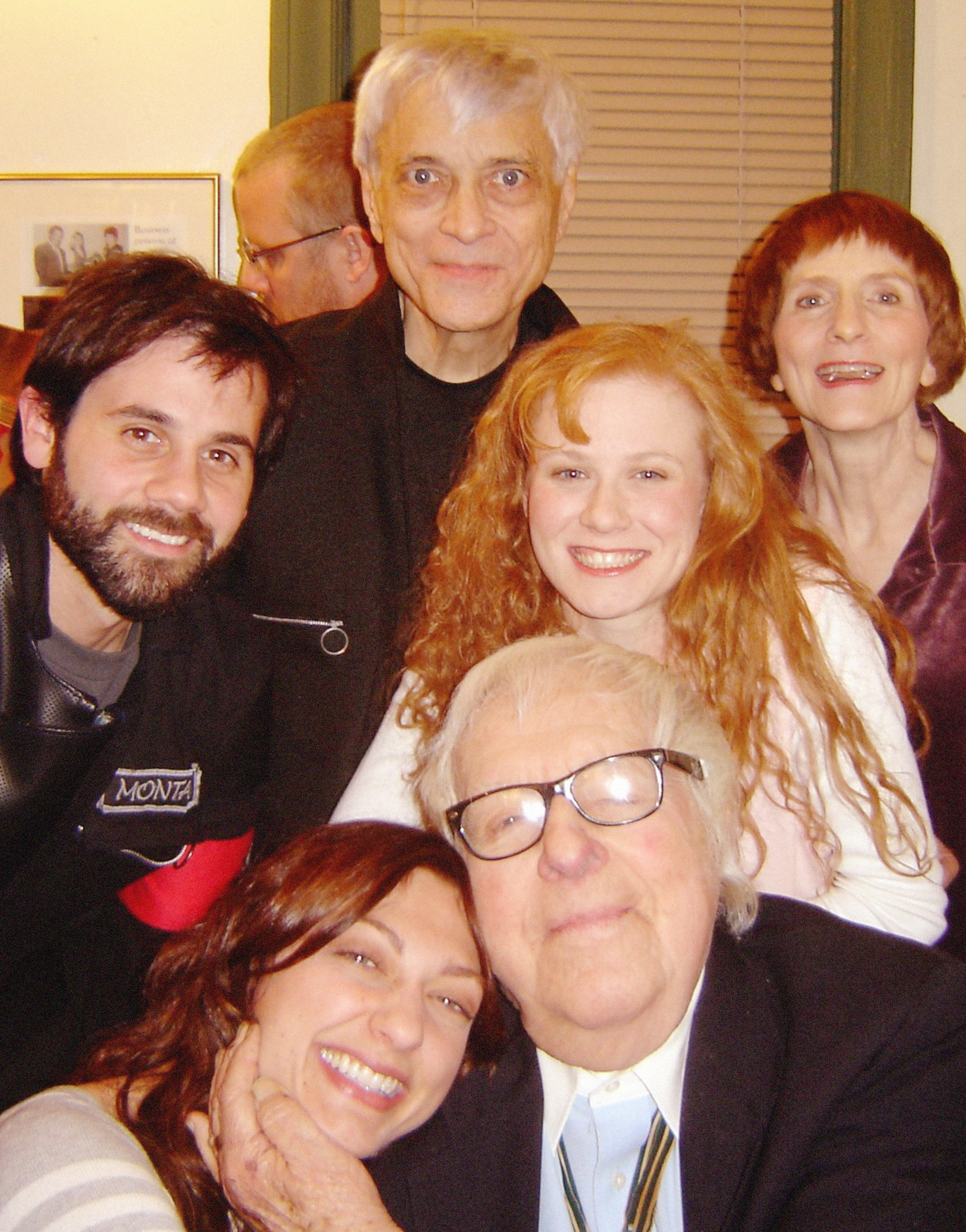
Pandemonium Theatre Company cast members pose with Ray Bradbury backstage of Fahrenheit 451 at the Fremont Centre Theatre, including Mageina Tovah, David Mauer, Stone, Michael Prichard and Roses Prichard in August 2008

American Chronicle reported that the opening weekend performances were attended by Bradbury. Journalist Joyce Schwarz, writing for Hollywood2020 singled out Stone and Polcyn's performances in a glowing review. The Los Angeles Times was mixed, believing that the technical features and directing "doesn't quite pull it all off." Jennie Webb reviewing for Backstage was fair, saying that most of the cast were exceptional, "even when [the production] gets a bit overindulgent."

In December 2008, she played Imogene Herdman in the holiday regional play, The Best Christmas Pageant Ever, based on the classic novel of the same name, adapted for the stage by Barbara Robinson and directed by Vicki Conrad at the Knightsbridge Theatre. Critic David C. Nichols writing for the Los Angeles Times felt the play was unpolished, though noted the Herdmans were enjoyable as the would-be stars. She was further cast in a guest role as a teenage girl in a coma with severe alcohol poisoning in the series finale of ER on NBC, which aired in April 2009 and was inspired by a true event that the series' producer experienced with his young niece, who died of the same cause. (Note: FOX News, 2009. "The special two-hour episode of the long-running medical drama was inspired by the tragic real-life story of 17-year-old Shelby Lyn Allen of Redding, Calif., who died of alcohol poisoning in December. 'E.R.' Executive Producer John Wells was so moved by the story of his real-life ex-niece that he wanted to include it in the series' final episode.") She also interpreted the historical figure, Helen Keller alongside Marilyn Zaslow as her teacher, Anne Sullivan in William Gibson's The Miracle Worker, directed by Rachel Manheimer, which opened in October and ran through mid November 2009 at the High Street Arts Center. The actresses were partly chosen for their proficiency in sign language as L.J. Stevens, the play's producer, commented to the VC Reporter. The play was highlighted for its casting. Rita Moran of Ventura County Star felt Stone and Zaslow shared good chemistry.

=== 2010–present ===
Stone portrayed artist Cyndi Lauper in David Daniels' directorial production of the musical, The Wedding Singer, based on the film of the same name, adapted for the stage by Tim Herlihy, presented by the Actors' Repertory Theatre of Simi and which played at the Simi Valley Cultural Arts Center from February through March 2010. She was also cast as a minor character, Rachel in Azazel Jacobs' coming-of-age directorial debut, Terri, which premiered at the Sundance Film Festival in January 2011.

She auditioned at an open casting call for director Thomas Moore's short film, Razor, winning the lead part of Nicole over 155 other auditions. While a student at the Los Angeles City College, Moore wrote the script and completed principal photography in 2010. The story focuses on a teenager whose father is in prison. Unable to cope with the stress, she seeks refuge in a church, but with the intention of hanging herself from the rafters. The story was, in part, inspired by Moore's own experiences while he lived in Avondale where he worked as a teacher. One of his students had committed suicide. Stone made her debut with the Kentwood Players Theatre Company in their production of Thomas Meehan's Annie, portraying Jane, Star-To-Be, and the Ensemble. The musical was directed by Susan Goldman Weisbarth with music direction by Bill Wolfe and choreography by Victoria Miller, which was staged at the Westchester Playhouse in Los Angeles during the winter 2010 season. From March to April 2011, she originated the role of Greta in Flip Kobler and Cindy Marcus' play, Some Sweet Day, a science fiction romantic comedy, which premiered at the Knightsbridge Theatre in Pasadena. The production was co-written by Kobler and Marcus, where Marcus also directed and Kobler interpreted the male lead, a scientific inventor, Ken who builds a machine and travels back in time. Greta is his best friend from the past. While a theatre review for LA Weekly praised Marcus' direction and conscious casting, the production was judged poorly for its overacting. Critic Michele E. Buttelman of The Signal was more positive, calling the performances "strong" and that Stone was "brilliant" as Greta opposite her on-stage mother, Baughn.

She reunited with ADR director Taliesin Jaffe for the New Generation Pictures English dub of Hellsing Ultimate, a rebooted adaptation of the manga, filling the role of a teenage Walter. Jacob Chapman of Anime News Network offered a mixed review of the final two episodes, though still expressed that the English-language track was notable. Stone was featured as Penny Pingleton, Tracy Turnblad's bubbly best friend raised by an overbearing mother, in the musical Hairspray, staged in January 2012 at the High Street Arts Center in Moorpark, directed by Shawn W. Lanz and choreographed by Arryck Adams. Cary Ginell, writing for Moorpark Acorn praised the cast, noting that Stone's Penny was "perky" opposite Tosh Hall as a "slick Seaweed." A highly positive review by StageSceneLA underscored the production as well as Stone whose Penny "is a piquant pixie with a voice twice her size." High Street's company of Hairspray, along with the Simi Valley Cultural Arts Center's Hairspray were invited to perform "You Can't Stop the Beat", sharing the stage at the Four Star Theater Alliance Awards, televised locally from Simi Valley on January 22, 2012. At the Annual Four Star Theater Alliance Awards for Ventura County's local stage productions, which held its ceremony at the High Street Arts Center on January 19, 2013, High Street's revival of Hairspray was nominated for and won several awards, including Outstanding Featured Performance by Stone. In June, she portrayed Zaneeta Shinn in The Music Man and in August, she appeared in Rex Bravo, the Whistling Cowboy: Showdown at the Bombay Corral, directed by Miles and Rick Pratt, playing Sheilah, daughter of business tycoon Victoria Fox (performed by Sandy Pratt). Both productions opened at the High Street Arts Center.

She appeared in the spring 2014 season of the Kentwood Players' production of Fiddler on the Roof as Russian Jewish daughter, Chava, which was directed by Harold Dershimer with musical direction by Catherine Rahm and choreography by Isabella Olivas, and played at the Westchester Playhouse. Dany Margolies of Daily Breeze was mixed on the show, arguing that the direction was hit or miss, questioning the actors' safety in various scenes on a crowded stage. However, the music direction was called attention to, writing that though the cast may "not [have] the best singing voices currently on Los Angeles stages," the harmonies sounded acceptable as a group. The performances of the daughters were highlighted, elaborating that Stone shared notable chemistry with Bradley Miller as her father, Tevye. She provided the voice of Makoto in Capcom's Ultra Street Fighter IV, released in August 2014. Brad Gallaway of Game Critics believed the title was an improvement on Super Street Fighter IV, though he received the English dub negatively, arguing that the casting was "absolutely horrible" compared to the game's Japanese counterpart.

She was also cast as Honey in the Ojai Art Center Theater's production of Edward Albee's Who's Afraid of Virginia Woolf?, directed by Tom Eubanks, which opened in January and played through February 2015. In an interview with Ojai ACT's producer Vivien Latham, Stone confessed that she was not knowledgeable about the play when she walked into the audition; however, "the idea of this [four-character] play was really exciting," she said. "Honey is so unlike me. She really is! It was a huge challenge, because I have to play completely out of character. I've never played a drunk before, so that was interesting." She starred alongside Sean Rio Flynn as her husband, Nick where they promoted the play in a radio interview on Tom & Sandy 805, broadcast on KVTA (1590 AM).

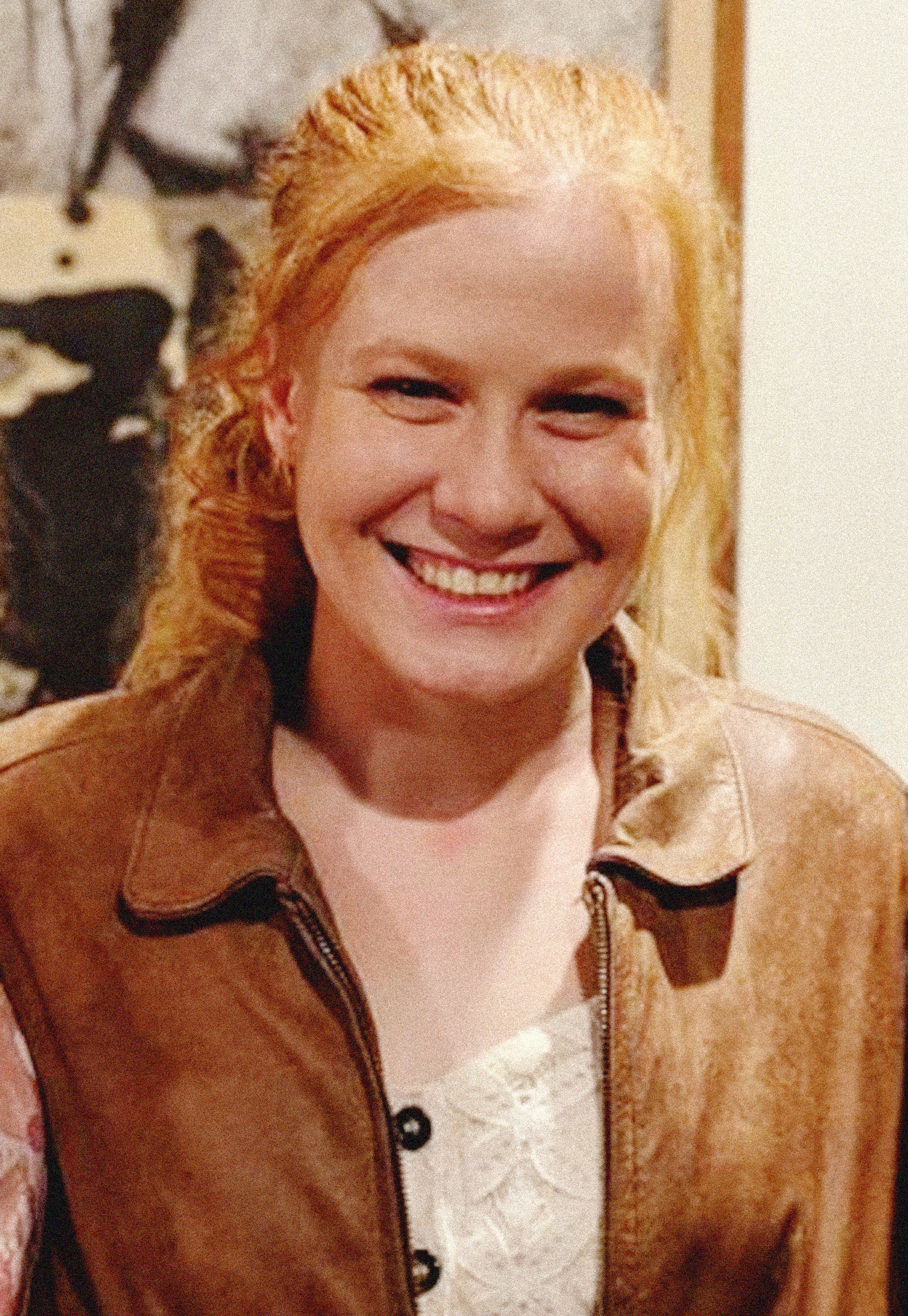
Stone attends a performance of Allegiance: The Musical in Los Angeles, California in April 2018

Sami Zahringer of Ojai Valley News praised the overall production and Stone's performance against a solid cast. When it is later revealed in Act II that she suffered a hysterical pregnancy, the only reason why Nick married her as he was manipulated into the relationship, he singled out Stone's ability to tap into Honey's moments of distress, calling it "heart-breaking." Matt McGee, writing for VC Reporter, was also positive, observing that the cast was well-selected for director Eubanks' interpretation of an already well-known classic amongst playwrights and theatregoers. "[E]ach proves to be part actor, part daredevil in pulling [the script's emotional acrobatics] off." During the Annual Four Star Theater Alliance Awards ceremony on January 10, 2016 at the High Streets Arts Center, Stone won in the Actress category for Outstanding Featured Performance Later, she starred as Nora Helmer in Nora by the Santa Paula Theater Center, which was performed in October. The play is a reinterpretation of A Doll's House penned by Ingmar Bergman (where he had edited down Henrik Ibsen's original work).

Stone ventured into directing a children's musical, Cindy: A Cinderella Tale, produced by the Vibe Performing Arts School and staged in Santa Clarita in June 2018, and portrayed the three-part role of, Louise Lerman, her mother, Betty Lerman, and Eve Allabout in the Off-Broadway classic, Ruthless!. The musical revival was directed by Alta Abbot, produced by Sherman Wayne and Martha Hunter, and choreographed by Victoria Miller at the Theatre Palisades' Pierson Playhouse in Pacific Palisades, California from November through December 2019. In a negative review for the "Stage Page" column of Culver City News, critic Sherri Barrett pointed out that the choreography was obviously simplistic to accommodate the actors' poor dancing. However, she hoped the cast would improve as the show continued its run. Jennika Ingram, writing for the Palisadian-Post was more forgiving, noting that Stone was believable as Louise, a character who lacks musical talent, and "power[ed]" through [the show] as the unappreciated Eve."

== Personal life ==
In 2009, a 7-year-old boy was struck in a hit-and-run accident in Los Angeles, requiring extensive surgery and post-operative therapy. Stone was one of many voice actors who participated in a charity event, auctioning autographs of anime memorabilia in order to raise funds for his family. Prior to her show, Ragtime opening at the Westchester Playhouse in 2013, her father had unexpectedly died; in the program, she dedicated her performance to him in his memory. (Note: Ventura County Star, 2016. "[A]fter the second year of the race, [Suzy Stone]'s husband, Billy, died unexpectedly.")

== Filmography ==
=== Theatre ===
Year	Title	Role	Notes
2000	To Kill a Mockingbird	Scout Finch	(as Jessica Stone) presented by the National American Shakespeare Company, directed by Roxanne Barker at the Knightsbridge Theatre, Pasadena
2002	The Butterfingers Angel, Mary & Joseph, Herod the Nut, & The Slaughter of 12 Hit Carols in a Pear Tree	Donkey	directed by Michael Kosik at the Santa Clarita Repertory Theatre Featured Rachel Hirschfeld
2003	The Sound of Music	Louisa von Trapp	directed by TimBen Boydston at the Canyon Theatre Guild
2003	A Midsummer Night's Dream	(as Jessica Stone)	directed by Phil Schwadron at the Canyon Theatre Guild
2005	Nottingham: A Totally Teen Musical	Joan Prince	presented by Showdown Stage Company, directed by Cindy Marcus at the Repertory East Playhouse
2005	Brother's Grimm Out of Order	(as Jessica Stone)	presented by Showdown Stage Academy, directed by Cindy Marcus at the Repertory East Playhouse
2006	Urinetown	Little Sally	(as Jessica Stone) presented by the Actors' Repertory Theatre of Simi, directed by Greg Zerkle at the Simi Valley Cultural Arts Center
2007	Picasso Does My Maps	Parker	(as Jessica Stone) presented by the Vox Humana Theatre Company, directed by Lisa Guzman at the Pico Playhouse
2007	Nottingham: A Totally Teen Musical	Joan Prince	presented by Showdown Stage Company, directed by Cindy Marcus at The Hub Theatre, North Hollywood
2008	Fahrenheit 451	Clarisse McClellan	(as Jessica Stone) presented by Bradbury's Pandemonium Theatre Company, directed by Alan Neal Hubbs at the Fremont Centre Theatre, Pasadena
2008	The Best Christmas Pageant Ever	Imogene Herdman	(as Jessica Stone) directed by Vicki Conrad at the Knightsbridge Theatre
2009	The Miracle Worker	Helen Keller	(as Jessica Stone) directed by Rachel Manheimer at the High Street Arts Center, Moorpark
2010	The Wedding Singer	Cyndi Lauper	(as Jessica Stone) presented by the Actors' Repertory Theatre of Simi, directed by David Daniels at the Simi Valley Cultural Arts Center
2010	Annie	Jane; Ensemble (Servant / Star-To-Be)	(as Jessica Stone) presented by the Kentwood Players, directed by Susan Goldman Weisbarth at the Westchester Playhouse, Los Angeles
2011	Some Sweet Day	Greta	(as Jessica Stone) directed by Cindy Marcus and Dennis Poore at the Knightsbridge Theatre
2012	Hairspray	Penny Pingleton	(as Jessica Stone) directed by Shawn W. Lanz at the High Street Arts Center, Moorpark
2012	Bergeracky: A Totally Teen Musical	Sydney	(as Jessica "Jess" Stone) presented by Showdown Stage Company, directed by Cindy Marcus at the Knightsbridge Theatre
2012	The Music Man	Zaneeta Shinn	directed by Ken Patton at the High Street Arts Center
2012	Rex Bravo, the Whistling Cowboy: Showdown at the Bombay Corral	Sheila Fox	directed by Miles and Rick Pratt at the High Street Arts Center
2013	Ragtime	Kathleen; Ensemble	presented by the Kentwood Players, directed by Susan Goldman Weisbarth at the Westchester Playhouse, Los Angeles
2014	Fiddler on the Roof	Chava	presented by the Kentwood Players, directed by Harold Dershimer at the Westchester Playhouse, Los Angeles
2015	Who's Afraid of Virginia Woolf?	Honey	(as Jessica Stone) directed by Tom Eubanks at the Ojai Art Center Theatre, Ojai
2015	Nora: A Doll's House	Nora Helmer	at the Santa Paula Theater Center
2018	Cindy: A Cinderella Tale	Director	presented by Vibe Performing Arts, Santa Clarita
2019	Ruthless!	Louise Lerman; Betty Lerman / Eve Allabout	directed by Alta Abbot at the Theatre Palisades, Pierson Playhouse, Palisades
2020	Christmas, Virtually	Hanukkah	(as Jessica Stone) presented by Showdown Stage Company, directed by Cindy Marcus at The MAIN, Valencia, Santa Clarita
2024	Never After Happily	Jack; Prunella; Spoon; Marina	presented by the Showdown Stage Company, directed by Cindy Marcus at The MAIN, Valencia

=== Voice over roles ===
==== Anime ====
Year	Title	Role	Notes
2003	Haibane Renmei	Dai	(as J.D. Stone) New Generation Pictures
2004	Angel Tales	Midori the Racoon dog	New Generation Pictures
2004	Ikki Tousen	Bun'Yaku Kansui (Ep. 1)	(as J.D. Stone) New Generation Pictures
2004	R.O.D the TV	Junior	(as J.D. Stone) New Generation Pictures
2004	Paranoia Agent	Boy with Cap / Boy with Glasses (Ep. 1); Apologizer 2 (Ep. 2); Schoolboys / Teaser (Ep. 6); Young Boy (Seiyu) / Animated Boy (Ep. 10)	(as Jay D. Stone) New Generation Pictures
2005	Rumiko Takahashi Anthology	Kota Haga (Ep. 1); Shohei Fuwa (Ep. 5); Kousuke Kogure (Ep. 13)	(as J.D. Stone) New Generation Pictures
2005	Mermaid's Forest	Nanao (Eps. 8-9)	(as Jay D. Stone) New Generation Pictures
2005	Daphne in the Brilliant Blue	Kenta Takahashi (Eps. 15-16)	(as J.D. Stone) New Generation Pictures
2006	Kamichu!	Shoukichi Hitotsubashi; Chibi Kaze (Ep. 1); Tulip (Ep. 2)	(as J.D. Stone) New Generation Pictures
2006	Hellsing Ultimate	Child of the Asylum (Ep. 1)	New Generation Pictures
2014	Ikki Tousen: Xtreme Xecutor	Bun'Yaku Kansui	(as J.D. Stone) New Generation Pictures
2014	Hellsing Ultimate	Young Walter C. Dornez (Ep. 9-10)	New Generation Pictures
2021	Muhyo & Roji's Bureau of Supernatural Investigation	Maril Mathias (S2, Eps. 5-8)	(as Jay D. Stone) New Generation Pictures
2021	Diary of Our Days at the Breakwater	Yūki Kuroiwa	(as Jay D. Stone) New Generation Pictures

==== Animation ====
Year	Title	Role	Notes
2001	Stanley	Stanley Griff	TV series Disney Channel
2002	A Charlie Brown Valentine	Marcie	TV special ABC
2005	Stanley's Dinosaur Round-Up	Stanley Griff	Direct-to-video film Disney
2005	Room to Grow	Woad	Short film

==== Video games ====
Year	Title	Role	Notes
2001	Stanley: Tiger Tales	Stanley Griff	Disney Interactive (PC)
2002	Stanley: Wild for Sharks!	Stanley Griff	Disney Interactive (PC)
2006	Playhouse Disney Preschool Time Online	Stanley Griff	Disney Interactive (PC)
2008–2009	The Last Remnant	Additional voices	Square Enix (Xbox 360 / Microsoft Windows)
2009	Valkyrie Profile: Covenant of the Plume	Mischka; Ull	Square Enix (Nintendo DS)
2010	Super Street Fighter IV	Makoto	Capcom (PlayStation 3 / Xbox 360)
2010	Sengoku Basara: Samurai Heroes	Otomo Sorin	Capcom (PlayStation 3 / Wii)
2011	Rune Factory: Tides of Destiny	Kelsey	Natsume Inc. (PlayStation 3 / Wii)
2014	Ultra Street Fighter IV	Makoto	Capcom (PlayStation 3 / Xbox 360)
2018–2019	The Last Remnant (Remastered)	Additional voices	Square Enix (PlayStation 4 / Nintendo Switch / iOS / Android)
2025	Monster Hunter Wilds	Additional voices	Capcom (PlayStation 5 / Microsoft Windows / Xbox Series X/S)

=== Live action roles ===
==== Film ====
Year	Title	Role	Notes
2001	Play Dead	Dustine "Dusty" Murphy	(as Jessica Stone) Slamdance Film Festival, Utah; New York Lesbian and Gay Film Festival
2001	Wheels Locked	Sydney	(as Jessica Stone) Short film; Best Shorts Competition, Rochester International Film Festival; Rhode Island International Film Festival; The Granada Theater, Dallas
2002	The Migration of Clouds	Whimsy	(as Jessica Stone) Short film; Sundance Film Festival
2003	A Light in the Forest: the Legend of Holly Boy	Miss Mistletoe	(as Jessica Stone)
2007	Kathy's Song	(as Jessica Stone)	Short film; directed by Rebecca Cremona, cinematography by Monika Lenczewska, American Film Institute
2008	Unmoving Sun	(as Jessica Stone)	Short film; directed by Oliver "Oli" Quintanilla, American Film Institute
2010	Razor	Nicole	Short film
2011	Terri	Rachel	(as Jessica Stone) Sundance Film Festival

==== Television ====
Year	Title	Role	Notes
1999–2000	Chicago Hope	Alicia Geiger (S6, Ep. 1-2; Ep. 8; Ep. 15)	(as Jessica Stone) CBS
2000	7th Heaven	Chrissy (S4, Ep. 20)	(as Jessica Stone) The WB
2001	Six Feet Under	Young Brenda Chenowith (S1, Eps. 5-6; S2 Ep.11)	(as Jessica Stone) HBO
2002	Star Trek: Enterprise	Narra (S1, Ep. 21)	(as Jessica Stone) UPN
2009	ER	Stacey Taylor (S15, Ep. 22)	(as Jessica Stone) NBC

=== Other work ===
Year	Title	Role	Notes
2008	CJ7	Classmate	(voice; English dub)

== Awards and nominations ==
Year	Award	Category	Nominated work	Result	Ref.
2005	Anime Dub Recognition (ADR) Awards	Dub of the Year (2004)	R.O.D the TV	Won	
2007	6th Annual Spotlight Awards	Young Artist of the Year Award	Simi Valley Cultural Arts Center Theater: Urinetown / Annie get Your Gun / Ragtime	Nominated	
2013	Four Star Theater Alliance Awards	Outstanding Featured Performance - Female (Penny Pingleton)	Hairspray	Won	
2016	Four Star Theater Alliance Awards	Outstanding Featured Performance - Female (Honey)	Who's Afraid of Virginia Woolf?	Won	
