= Serena Berman =

American actress, singer, and writer

- Occupations: Actress, writer, playwright, producer
- Years active: 1999–present

Serena Berman is an American actress, writer and producer. She has done voice-over work for animated series and films. She voiced Elyon Brown in the Disney show W.I.T.C.H. as a teenager, and she has guest starred in shows such as Ned's Declassified School Survival Guide and Justice League. She appeared in the romantic comedy film Set It Up which stars Zoey Deutch and Glen Powell.

== Career ==
Berman did 44 episodes of the Disney animated television series W.I.T.C.H. and created a small following for her character of Elyon Brown. As the voice of Elyon Brown, she was often a guest at various fan conventions.

Berman also made appearances in Ned's Declassified School Survival Guide as Marty's sister Marva, and as Lucy van Pelt in both Lucy Must Be Traded, Charlie Brown and Charlie Brown's Christmas Tales.

- Set It Up (2018)
- Just Peck (2009) (TV movie)
- W.I.T.C.H. (2004–2006) (TV series, voice)
- Ned's Declassified School Survival Guide (2006) (TV series)
- Lucy Must Be Traded, Charlie Brown (2003) (TV movie, voice) (as Lucy van Pelt)
- Charlie Brown's Christmas Tales (2002) (TV movie, voice) (as Lucy van Pelt)
- Justice League (2002) (TV series, voice)
- The Others (2000) (TV series)
- Seven Girlfriends (1999)

== Filmography ==
=== Film ===
| Year | Title | Role | Notes |
|---|---|---|---|
| 1999 | Seven Girlfriends | Arlene | |
| 2009 | Just Peck | Sage | |
| 2015 | Jaywalk Cop | Jaywalking Youth | short |
| 2018 | Set It Up | Young Talented Writer | |

=== Television ===
| Year | Title | Role | Notes |
|---|---|---|---|
| 2000 | The Others | Amy | Episode "Mora" |
| 2002 | Justice League | Cassie | Episode "Paradise Lost" |
| 2002 | Charlie Brown's Christmas Tales | Lucy van Pelt | TV special |
| 2003 | Lucy Must Be Traded, Charlie Brown | Lucy van Pelt | TV special |
| 2004 - 2006 | W.I.T.C.H. | Elyon Brown | Recurring |
| 2006 | Ned's Declassified School Survival Guide | Marva Qwerly | Episode "Failing & Tutors" |
