= Megan Taylor Harvey =

American voice actress

- Occupation: Voice actress
- Years active: 2001–present

Megan Taylor Harvey is an American voice actress who is known for providing voices for English dubs of anime for New Generation Pictures and NYAV Post.

== Roles ==
=== Anime ===
Year	Title	Role	Notes	Source
2004–05	R.O.D the TV	Hisami Hishiishi		
2006	Gun Sword	Melissa		Resume
2006	Kamichu!	Yurie Hitotsubashi		Resume
2013-2014	Ikki Tousen	Koumei Shokatsuryou		
2018	FLCL Alternative	Kana Koumoto		
2021	Diary of Our Days at the Breakwater	Hina Tsurugi		
2021	Scarlet Nexus	Hanabi Ichijo		
2022	LBX Girls	Riko		
2023	FLCL: Shoegaze	Kana Koumoto		
2025	Blue Box	Ayame Moriya, Yamaguchi, Sana, Tagawa	Netflix dub	

=== Film ===
Year	Title	Role	Notes	Source
2014	Welcome to the Space Show	Ink		
2018	Liz and the Blue Bird	Yuko Yoshikawa		
2022	Summer Ghost	Ayane		
2024	Sailor Moon Cosmos	Sailor Mnemosyne		

=== Video games ===
Year	Title	Role	Notes	Source
2008	Final Fantasy IV	Palom		
2011	Rune Factory: Tides of Destiny	Violet		
2015	The Legend of Heroes: Trails of Cold Steel	Towa Herschel		
2016	Street Fighter V	Li-Fen		
2016	The Legend of Heroes: Trails of Cold Steel II	Towa Herschel		
2017	Fire Emblem Heroes	Kiria, Sue, Phina, Veyle		
2018	Blazblue Cross Tag Battle	Yumi		
2019	The Legend of Heroes: Trails of Cold Steel IV	Towa Herschel		
2020	Sakuna: Of Rice and Ruin	Yui		
2020	Puyo Puyo Tetris 2	Marle		
2021	Persona 5 Strikers	Sophia		
2021	Nier Replicant ver.1.22474487139...	Additional voices		
2021	Scarlet Nexus	Hanabi Ichijo, Alice Ichijo		
2021	Tales of Arise	Hootle		
2022	Rune Factory 5	Priscilla		
2022	Soul Hackers 2	Ringo		
2023	Fire Emblem Engage	Veyle		
2023	The Legend of Heroes: Trails into Reverie	Towa Herschel, Shanshan		
2023	Silent Hope	Farmer		
2025	The Legend of Heroes: Trails Through Daybreak II	Towa Herschel		
2026	Cookie Run: Kingdom	Pom-pom Dough Cookie		

=== Animation ===
Year	Title	Role	Notes	Source
2002	Charlie Brown's Christmas Tales	Sally Brown		
2003	Lucy Must Be Traded, Charlie Brown	Sally Brown		
2012	Peter Rabbit	Flopsy		Resume

== Movies ==
Year	Title	Role	Notes	Source
2001	Joe Dirt	Joe Dirt's Sister		
2009	Etienne!	Elodie		
