= Meet the Robinsons (video game) =

2007 video game

- Developers: Avalanche Software; Climax Studios (GBA); Altron (DS)
- Publisher: Buena Vista Games
- Platforms: Game Boy Advance; Microsoft Windows; Nintendo DS; GameCube; PlayStation 2 Wii; Xbox 360
- Release: 2007
- Genre: Action-adventure

Meet the Robinsons is a 2007 action-adventure game developed by Avalanche Software and published by Buena Vista Games under the Disney banner. It is based on the 2007 film of the same name.

== Console version ==
=== Storyline ===
The game begins with Wilbur Robinson doing some time-traveling of his own, risking both his safety and the time stream in the process. Despite his father's warning not to mess with the time machine while he's away on a business trip, Wilbur does not seem fazed. Soon, the second time machine is stolen by the Bowler Hat Guy and Wilbur ends up following him into the past. Wilbur accidentally knocks down Stanley and Lizzie, disrupting the time stream in the process. With their projects ruined and their dreams crushed, an alternate future is created.

Carl immediately calls Wilbur back to the future, realizing that their world is now under the dangerous control of Emperor Stanley and Queen Lizzie. It is up to Wilbur to fix the time stream before he can go back to pursue the Bowler Hat Guy, events which lead straight-up to Wilbur's entrance in the film.

=== Gameplay ===
The game follows Wilbur through 40 missions and 6 different locales, a few of which are revisited in the movie. Secret Blueprints allow the player to "build" different Cheats and Extras, using Cornelius Robinson's Transmogrifier. This machine creates items using Base Components which Wilbur collects during his adventure. A Breakout like game called Chargeball is both featured in the game itself and as an extra gameplay option. Different Chargeball "maps" can be found throughout game and it is up to Wilbur to become the Chargeball champion.

Original actors such as Wesley Singerman, Harland Williams, Adam West, Nicole Sullivan, and Stephen Anderson reprise their roles for the Robinson family, while Daniel Hansen (Lewis) does not appear in the game at all.

The locations in this game include: ancient Egypt, the Robinsons' house, the Robinsons' basement, Joyce Williams Elementary School, the alternate future, Magma Industries, and Old Town.

== Game Boy Advance version ==
=== Storyline ===
After Lewis returns to the past and prepares for his new life, Wilbur arrives back home only to find that his house has been invaded by several hundred Mini-Doris hats. He learns that Mini-Doris, which Frannie's frogs originally captured, has made its way to Robinson Industries to begin cloning herself. Wilbur travels back into the past in the hopes that Lewis will be able to help him again, an offer which Lewis is at first reluctant to take.

=== Gameplay ===
Exclusively developed for the Game Boy Advance, the Climax Studios game features a completely different storyline and uses a mix of side-scrolling, top-view, and flying levels (for the Time Machine) throughout. Both Wilbur and Lewis are able to create and activate several different inventions by finding invention pieces throughout the levels. In addition, InventCo Egg-Timers and Gift Boxes are hidden throughout; collecting enough of these will unlock special "Goodies" on the main menu. In addition, a "Battery" meter serves as both a life gauge and a power gauge for the many different inventions.

The events of the game take place immediately after the film, rather than before like in the Disney Interactive Studios version. Due to the limitations of the Game Boy Advance, no voice-acting is featured.

== Nintendo DS version ==
The Nintendo DS version is a third-person shooter with a simplified version of the console storyline, borrowing familiar game elements, such as the Dissembler and Charge Glove as well as adding exclusive ones. It follows the console version in four different worlds; Egypt, Lizzy, Stanley, and finally the Bowler Hat Guy's robotic hat - Doris, that ensures a final battle for the future. The Nintendo DS version also includes chargeball as well, just as the console version.

== Reception ==
Reception

Aggregate score
Aggregator	Score
Metacritic	DS: 64/100 (6 reviews); NGC: 68/100 (5 reviews); PC: 69/100 (4 reviews); PS2: 67/100 (13 reviews); WII: 62/100 (11 reviews); X360: 65/100 (21 reviews)

Review scores
Publication	Score
GameSpot	X360/PS2/PC/GC: 6.9/10; Wii: 6.7/10; DS: 6.6/10; GBA: 4.3/10
GameSpy	PS2/GC/DS: 3/5; GBA: 2.5/5; Wii: 2/5
GameZone	6.5/10; 5.0/10
IGN	PS2: 7.0/10; Wii: 6.8/10; DS: 6.5/10
Official Xbox Magazine (US)	6.0/10
X-Play	3/5

The game received "mixed or average" reviews, according to Metacritic.

GameSpot gave the Xbox 360, PlayStation 2, PC and GameCube versions a 6.9 out of 10, while the Wii version was given a 6.7 out of 10, the Nintendo DS version a 6.7 out of 10 and the Game Boy Advance version a 4.3 out of 10.

GameZone gave the Xbox 360 version a 6.5 out of 10, while the PlayStation 2 version was given a 5.0 out of 10.

IGN gave both the PlayStation 2 version a 7.0 out of 10 and the Wii version a 6.8 out of 10. Nintendo DS version received a 6.5 out of 10, writing: "Time travel has never been easier... or shorter".

== See also ==
- List of Wii games
- List of Nintendo DS games
