= Wesley Singerman =

American musician (born 1990)

- Born: Wesley Steven Singerman; August 23, 1990 (age 35); Tarzana, California, U.S.
- Occupations: Guitarist; record producer; songwriter; actor
- Years active: 1999–present
- Notable credit(s): Meet the Robinsons as Wilbur Robinson; A Charlie Brown Valentine, Charlie Brown's Christmas Tales and Lucy Must Be Traded, Charlie Brown as Charlie Brown
- Children: 1

Wesley Steven Singerman (born August 23, 1990) is an American record producer, songwriter and retired child actor. He is perhaps best known for voicing Wilbur Robinson in the 2007 animated film Meet the Robinsons. Since 2015, he has been credited with production work for several music industry artists, such as Kendrick Lamar, Kanye West, 21 Savage, and Jennifer Lopez, among others.

== Early life ==
Singerman was born in Tarzana, California on August 23, 1990. He graduated from Calabasas High School in 2008.

== Career ==
=== Acting ===
He became the voice of Charlie Brown in 2002, starting with the special A Charlie Brown Valentine. One reviewer opined Singerman was faithful to the "everlasting haplessness" of Charlie Brown. He continued playing the character in Charlie Brown's Christmas Tales (2002) and Lucy Must Be Traded, Charlie Brown (2003).

Singerman is most recognized for his role in the 2007 Walt Disney Animation Studios' film Meet the Robinsons as Wilbur Robinson, a time traveler. After Meet the Robinsons, Singerman announced that he was retiring from his voice acting career to focus on music. Singerman has announced that at some point, he will return to his voice acting career.

=== Music ===
As a record producer, songwriter and guitar player, Singerman has worked on releases by Ty Dolla $ign, Rich Brian, and others. Alongside Rogét Chahayed, Singerman contributed two songs on Kendrick Lamar's album To Pimp a Butterfly (2015). He served as guitarist on DRAM's debut album Big Baby DRAM (2016). In 2021, he co-wrote the song "Fire in the Sky" for the soundtrack of Shang-Chi and the Legend of the Ten Rings.

== Discography ==
Year	Artist	Album	Title	Songwriter	Producer
2015	Kendrick Lamar	To Pimp A Butterfly		☒	check
2016	Ava Lily	Painkiller	Painkiller	check	check
2018	Rich Brian	Amen	Flight	check	check
2019	Jai Wolf	The Cure to Loneliness	Your Day ft. Day Wave	check	check
2019	Drax Project	Drax Project	All This Time	check	check
2019	Kyle Dion	Suga (Deluxe Edition)	Play Too Much ft. UMI & Duckwrth	check	check
2019	NIKI	Head in the Clouds II	Indigo	check	check
2020	Stephanie Poetri	Straight To You	Straight To You	check	check
2020	Party Favor	ACTUP	ACTUP ft. JAHMED	check	check
2021	Wafia	Wide Open	Wide Open with Ta-ku and Masego	check	check
2021	RAY BLK	Access Denied	25	check	check
2021	21 Savage & Rich Brian with Warren Hue and MaSiWei --------------- Anderson .Paak	Shang-Chi and the Legend of the Ten Rings (soundtrack)	Lazy Susan	check	check
2021	21 Savage & Rich Brian with Warren Hue and MaSiWei --------------- Anderson .Paak	Shang-Chi and the Legend of the Ten Rings (soundtrack)	Fire in the Sky	check	check
2021	Olivia O'Brien	Better Than Feeling Lonely	Better Than Feeling Lonely	check	check
2022	Jackson Wang	Lost & Found	The Moment	check	check
2022	Poppy Ajudha	THE POWER IN US	Holiday From Reality	check	check
2022	Party Favor	Whenever You're Around	Whenever You're Around	check	check
2022	Felivand	Butterfly Wings	Butterfly Wings	check	check
2022	Leon Fanourakis	MUSA	RELAX feat. WLYWNKA	check	check
2022	Party Favor	I See You with Marc E. Bassy	I See You with Marc E. Bassy	check	check
2022	Kehlani	Blue Water Road	Shooter Interlude	check	check
2022	Kehlani	Blue Water Road	Little Story	check	check
2022	Princess Nokia	Diva	Diva	check	check
2022	Joji	Smithereens	Die for You	check	check
2023	The Rampage	ROUND & ROUND	Change My Life	check	check
2023	Jarina de Marco	Caribbean All-Inclusive Luxury	Masa feat. Calacote and mediopicky	check	check
2023	Dawn Richard	The Architect'	Bubblegum	check	check
2023	Noname	Sundial	Potentially the Interlude	check	check
2023	Jon Batiste	World Music Radio	Hello Billy Bob		check
2023	Jon Batiste	World Music Radio	CALL NOW (504-305-8329)	check	check
2023	Jon Batiste	World Music Radio	Running Away featuring Leigh-Anne	check	check
2023	Jai Wolf	Don't Look Down featuring Banks	Don't Look Down featuring Banks	check	check
2024	Jennifer Lopez	This Is Me... Now	Butterfly	check	check
2024	1999 WRITE THE FUTURE	hella	avocado shake	check	check
2024	1999 WRITE THE FUTURE	hella	thanksgivin	check	check
2024	1999 WRITE THE FUTURE	hella	BiG IsLaND jazz hOUr	check	check
2024	¥$	Vultures 2	River	check	check
2026	Taeyang	Quintessence	4U	☒	check

== Filmography ==
=== Film ===
Year	Title	Role	Notes
2001	The Little Polar Bear	Lars	English version
2003	Just for Kicks	Sal	
2004	The Nutcracker and the Mouse King	Nutcracker	Direct-to-video; English version
2007	Meet the Robinsons	Wilbur Robinson	

=== Television ===
Year	Title	Role	Notes
2000	Felicity	Oscar	Episode: "And to All a Good Night"
2001	The Amanda Show		Episode #2.26
2002	A Charlie Brown Valentine	Charlie Brown (voice)	television specials
2002	Charlie Brown's Christmas Tales	Charlie Brown (voice)	television specials
2003	Lucy Must Be Traded, Charlie Brown	Charlie Brown (voice)	television specials
2006	7th Heaven	Student #9	Episode: "Got MLK?"

=== Video games ===
Year	Title	Role
2007	Meet the Robinsons	Wilbur Robinson
