= Charlie Brown's Christmas Tales =

2002 animated Christmas television special

- Genre: Animated television special
- Based on: Peanuts by Charles M. Schulz
- Written by: Charles M. Schulz
- Directed by: Larry Leichliter
- Voices of: Wesley Singerman; Megan Taylor Harvey; Serena Berman; Tim Deters; Lauren Schaffel; Christopher Ryan Johnson; Bill Melendez
- Theme music composer: Vince Guaraldi
- Opening theme: "Skating"
- Ending theme: "Linus and Lucy"
- Composer: David Benoit
- Country of origin: United States
- Original language: English

Production
- Producer: Bill Melendez
- Running time: 18 minutes
- Production companies: United Media; Lee Mendelson/Bill Melendez Productions

Original release
- Network: ABC
- Release: December 8, 2002

Related
- A Charlie Brown Valentine (2002); Lucy Must Be Traded, Charlie Brown (2003)

Charlie Brown's Christmas Tales is the 41st prime-time animated TV special based on characters from the Charles M. Schulz comic strip Peanuts. It originally aired on ABC December 8, 2002. It was thereafter broadcast each Christmas season after that through to 2019 as a companion segment in an hour-long slot featuring an unedited version of A Charlie Brown Christmas.

It is the only TV special to credit Charles M. Schulz posthumously for writing; Schulz is not credited in such a way in subsequent TV specials.

== Plot ==
The special consists of five vignettes, each one starring a different member of the Peanuts gang in various Christmastime situations, largely inspired by original Peanuts comic strips. The installments are as follows:

=== Happy Holidays from Snoopy ===
Snoopy tries to get Lucy to ask him to join her in the skating show, but she's only interested in Schroeder, who rudely rejects her. Later, he dresses up like Santa Claus to work as a bell-ringer to raise money. He is briefly confronted by an angry Rerun, who chastises him for failing to deliver the toys promised to him the previous Christmas. At one point, while dressed as Santa, he plays "Oh! Susanna" on the accordion, which Lucy comments "isn't very Christmasy" as she and Linus walk by. Hearing that, he quickly switches to "Christmas Time Is Here" (with Woodstock whistling along). At Charlie Brown's urging, he also attempts to make peace with the ferocious cat who lives next door but to no avail.

=== Yuletide Greetings from Linus ===
Linus tries to decide what kind of letter he should write to Santa.

The next day at school, he meets a girl who repeatedly changes her name (Lydia). When Linus points out that her name of the day, Jezebel, is a hated Old Testament figure who was thrown from a window to her death, the girl changes her name of the day to Susan. Linus tries to ask for her address to send her a Christmas card, and she gives an address that, much to his annoyance, turns out to be fake when the card is returned. When asked why he's so interested in her, he replies flatly: "She fascinates me."

=== Season's Greetings from Sally ===
Sally decides to give everyone paper airplanes for Christmas and writes her Christmas letter to "Samantha Claus" (her beard being a disguise). After school, a furious Sally blames Charlie Brown for not telling her that she was thinking of Santa Claus.

Not knowing how to cut down a Christmas tree, Sally decides to go out and "fall down" a tree: look at it and hope it falls on its own. Her first target turns out to be in the yard of a hostile "ugly kid," who, in disbelief, flippantly tells her she can have the tree if it falls down. In what Sally describes as "a Christmas miracle," the tree does fall down on its own. The ugly kid comes to the Browns' house and demands the tree back, but Sally refuses. The night before Christmas Eve, Sally is overcome with guilt and decides to return the tree anyway, but the ugly kid has since changed his mind and agrees to keep his word, forcing Snoopy (who had already decorated the tree) to bring it back home and decorate it all over again.

In the last scene, when she and Charlie Brown decorate the Christmas tree, he tells Sally that when their grandmother hung a sock in the chimney, it was filled with fruit on Christmas morning. Inspired, Sally searches for socks, but they're all too little so she hangs them all.

=== Peace on Earth from Lucy ===
Lucy struggles with being nice and tries to get Schroeder and Linus to buy her presents, at one point trying to justify it by claiming that because the Bible has the word "sister" in it, it means Linus must buy her a Christmas present.

=== Merry Christmas from Charlie Brown ===
Charlie Brown writes a Christmas card to the Little Red-Haired Girl. To Linus's dismay, he writes to her calling himself "your sweet babboo," the phrase Sally has always used to refer to Linus. Charlie points out it's a Brown family expression.

Charlie Brown and Sally prepare for Christmas together. Sally thinks she has spotted Santa Claus, but it turns out to be Snoopy in his Santa outfit. She later is haunted by "visions of sugarplums" and is relieved when Charlie Brown tells her they are simply a type of candy.

In the final sketch, Charlie Brown tells Sally he ordered a toy bicycle for her dollhouse, which never arrived. He speculates it was likely delivered to the wrong address. A dismayed Sally replies that she hopes whoever received the bike will enjoy it. The scene cuts to Woodstock riding off on the bike.

== Voice cast ==
- Wesley Singerman as Charlie Brown/Ugly Kid
- Serena Berman as Lucy van Pelt
- Megan Taylor Harvey as Sally Brown
- Corey Padnos as Linus van Pelt
- Bill Melendez as Snoopy and Woodstock
- Lauren Schaffel as Lydia
- Christopher Ryan Johnson as Schroeder
- Tim Deters as Rerun van Pelt

== Origin ==
When A Charlie Brown Christmas was created in 1965, the program was designed as a 30-minute time program. By the 1990s, changes in the delivery of closing credits and increases in advertising minutes on the networks made it impossible for all of A Charlie Brown Christmas to be aired in a half-hour time slot. In 2010, the special ran, with commercials, for 35 minutes.

CBS made several cuts to A Charlie Brown Christmas to keep it in the half-hour time slot, including standardizing the closing credits and cutting out the closing song of "Hark! The Herald Angels Sing". Fans of the special were angered by the cuts. In response, when ABC acquired the rights to the special shortly before creator Charles Schulz's death, it gave the special a full hour slot, leaving 18 minutes of airtime to fill. During 2001, the first year ABC aired A Charlie Brown Christmas, the show was followed by a retrospective hosted by Whoopi Goldberg featuring the voice cast and producers of the special. Charlie Brown's Christmas Tales was created to replace that retrospective in rounding out the hour for subsequent airings. It first aired December 8, 2002, and aired annually on ABC through 2019.

From 2010 to 2012, a portion of the special was cut to clear a spot for Prep & Landing: Operation: Secret Santa, a seven-minute short produced by Walt Disney Animation Studios. Only "Happy Holidays from Snoopy", "Yuletide Greetings from Linus", and "Merry Christmas from Charlie Brown" aired in these years, though the special has again been shown in its entirety since 2013.

Apple TV+ announced that it would re-release the special on December 2, 2022, two years after Apple acquired the rights to the Peanuts library.

=== Music score ===
The music score for Charlie Brown's Christmas Tales was composed by Vince Guaraldi (except where noted) and performed and arranged by David Benoit.

Happy Holidays from Snoopy

1. "Skating"
2. "Oh! Susanna" (Stephen Foster)
3. "Christmas Time Is Here"
4. "Christmas Is Coming"

Yuletide Greetings from Linus

1. "Charlie Brown Theme" (Vince Guaraldi, Lee Mendelson)
2. "Pebble Beach"

Season's Greetings from Sally

1. "Oh, Good Grief"(Vince Guaraldi, Lee Mendelson)
2. "O Tannenbaum (Ernst Anschütz; arr. Vince Guaraldi)

Peace on Earth from Lucy

1. "You're in Love, Charlie Brown"
2. "Für Elise" (Ludwig van Beethoven)
3. "Blue Charlie Brown"

Merry Christmas from Charlie Brown

1. "Christmas Time Is Here"
2. "Linus and Lucy"

== Home media ==
Charlie Brown's Christmas Tales was also included as a bonus feature on the original Paramount Home Entertainment US DVD for I Want a Dog for Christmas, Charlie Brown, although not on the UK release or the later Warner Home Video US re-release. Warner Home Video released it on its own DVD, with Is This Goodbye, Charlie Brown? as a bonus feature, released on November 3, 2009, as a CVS Pharmacy exclusive and then expanded to the wider market in 2010. It was re-released as part of the box set Snoopy's Holiday Collection on October 1, 2013.

On October 7, 2025, it was re-released on the DVD and Blu-Ray collection Peanuts: 75th Anniversary Ultimate TV Specials Collection along with 39 other Peanuts specials.
