= Lucy Must Be Traded, Charlie Brown =

2003 television special

- Genre: Animated television special
- Created by: Charles M. Schulz
- Written by: Charles M. Schulz
- Voices of: Wesley Singerman; Serena Berman; Corey Padnos; Daniel Hansen; Melissa Montoya; Christopher Ryan Johnson; Megan Taylor Harvey; Bill Melendez
- Theme music composer: Vince Guaraldi
- Opening theme: "Linus and Lucy"
- Composers: Vince Guaraldi; David Benoit
- Country of origin: United States
- Original language: English

Production
- Running time: 21 minutes
- Production companies: United Feature Syndicate; Mendelson-Melendez Productions

Original release
- Network: ABC
- Release: August 29, 2003

Related
- Charlie Brown's Christmas Tales (2002); I Want a Dog for Christmas, Charlie Brown (2003)

Lucy Must Be Traded, Charlie Brown is the 42nd prime-time animated television special based upon the comic strip Peanuts, by Charles M. Schulz. It originally aired on the ABC network on August 29, 2003.

== Plot ==
At the start of baseball season, Charlie Brown feels both excited and anxious. His apprehension stems from Lucy's constant interruptions with questions, sarcasm, and nonsensical comments, which make him physically ill on the pitcher's mound.

After losing the first game to Peppermint Patty's team, Charlie Brown proposes trading Snoopy for five of Peppermint Patty's players. His team objects, prompting him to cancel the deal. This decision proves wise, as Peppermint Patty's players refuse to play under Charlie Brown.

Later, Charlie Brown trades Lucy for Marcie and a pizza. Marcie ignores her position and stands by Charlie Brown on the mound. Lucy disrupts Peppermint Patty's games with her usual antics, leading Peppermint Patty to request reversing the trade. Charlie Brown agrees, admitting he already ate the pizza. Confidence restored, Charlie Brown prepares for the next game, which ends abruptly due to heavy rain.

== Source material ==
The storyline involving Snoopy's failed trade to Peppermint Patty's team is adapted from a Peanuts comic arc from fall 1967. The subplot of Lucy's and Marcie's trades originates from a separate storyline published in 1988.

Notably, Peppermint Patty refers to Snoopy as "that funny-looking kid with a big nose." This phrasing aligns with the 1967 era of Peanuts strips, as Peppermint Patty did not realize Snoopy was a dog until 1974 and no longer referred to him in that manner afterward.

== Voice cast ==
- Serena Berman as Lucy van Pelt
- Wesley Singerman as Charlie Brown
- Corey Padnos as Linus van Pelt
- Daniel Hansen as Peppermint Patty
- Melissa Montoya as Marcie
- Megan Taylor Harvey as Sally Brown
- Christopher Ryan Johnson as Schroeder
- Bill Melendez as Snoopy and Woodstock

Frieda and Pig-Pen also appear, but are silent.

== Home media ==
It was released on VHS and DVD on March 2, 2004, and again on May 1, 2012, as part of a single disc called Happiness is...Peanuts: Team Snoopy.

On October 7, 2025, it was re-released on the DVD and Blu-Ray collection Peanuts: 75th Anniversary Ultimate TV Specials Collection along with 39 other Peanuts specials.
