= A Charlie Brown Valentine =

2002 animated television special

- Genre: Animated television special
- Based on: Peanuts by Charles M. Schulz
- Written by: Charles M. Schulz
- Voices of: Wesley Singerman; Corey Padnos; Lauren Schaffel; Nicolette Little; Jessica D. Stone; Emily Lalande; Christopher Ryan Johnson; Bill Melendez
- Music by: Vince Guaraldi
- Opening theme: "Linus and Lucy"
- Ending theme: "Heartburn Waltz"
- Country of origin: United States
- Original language: English

Production
- Executive producer: Lee Mendelson
- Running time: 25 minutes
- Production company: Lee Mendelson/Bill Melendez Productions

Original release
- Network: ABC
- Release: February 14, 2002

Related
- It's the Pied Piper, Charlie Brown (2000); Charlie Brown's Christmas Tales (2002)

A Charlie Brown Valentine is the 40th animated television special based on characters and storylines from the Charles M. Schulz comic strip Peanuts. It features the Peanuts characters during the week leading up to Valentine's Day. It is the second Valentine's Day-themed Peanuts special, following Be My Valentine, Charlie Brown (1975).

Initially broadcast February 14, 2002 on ABC, A Charlie Brown Valentine was the first new Peanuts special to air on television since 1994's You're in the Super Bowl, Charlie Brown, and the first original special to be produced and televised since Schulz's death in February 2000.

== Plot ==
Snoopy steals a kiss from his owner in A Charlie Brown Valentine

Charlie Brown struggles to muster the courage to talk to the Little Red-Haired Girl during lunch. She drops her pencil, which he picks up and notices has teeth marks, making him realize she is human. He plans to return it as an excuse to speak with her, but Lucy intercepts and returns it first.

Charlie Brown buys a box of chocolates for the Little Red-Haired Girl but hesitates to give it to her directly. Meanwhile, Sally pursues Linus unsuccessfully, and Marcie expresses affection for Charlie Brown, causing misunderstandings. Peppermint Patty also declares her feelings, further confusing him.

Charlie Brown practices giving a valentine to the Little Red-Haired Girl, using Snoopy as a stand-in, but feels unsure. Linus suggests inviting her to the Valentine's Day dance. Charlie Brown attempts to call her but mistakenly reaches Peppermint Patty, who accepts the invitation.

At the dance, Charlie Brown finds the Little Red-Haired Girl already dancing with Snoopy after being preoccupied with Marcie and Peppermint Patty. Afterward, the girls criticize his dancing. Charlie Brown, disheartened by his lack of success and not receiving a valentine, is comforted when Snoopy brings him one.

== Voice cast ==
- Wesley Singerman as Charlie Brown and Eudora
- Corey Padnos as Linus van Pelt
- Lauren Schaffel as Lucy van Pelt
- Nicolette Little as Sally Brown
- Jessica D. Stone as Marcie
- Emily Lalande as Peppermint Patty
- Christopher Ryan Johnson as Schroeder
- Bill Melendez as Snoopy

== Production notes ==
A Charlie Brown Valentine was the first Peanuts special to be produced after the 2000 death of Peanuts creator Charles M. Schulz. It also marked the third time a Peanuts special was animated with digital ink and paint as opposed to traditional cel animation (the first one to do so was It Was My Best Birthday Ever, Charlie Brown in 1997 and the second was It's the Pied Piper, Charlie Brown in 2000.) The animation was done by Korean studio My Plan Animation; A Charlie Brown Valentine was their only Peanuts work. Lee Mendelson stated in 2012 of the animation outsourcing: "Everyone started sending work overseas. It didn't seem to affect the final outcome. If they can do it as well as we can do it for a lot less money, fine. If it didn't look good, Sparky would never have allowed it. If we had gone to him and said, 'We can't afford to do it here anymore,' and we couldn't do it well overseas, he would have just said, 'Let’s not do anymore.'" The special features a drawing style similar to the comic strip, with a white outline around Lucy's short hair and Snoopy's long ears (this was dropped in future specials).

A Charlie Brown Valentine also depicts the Little Red-Haired Girl in full view, though she remains unnamed in this special, in contrast to her first full-view appearance in It's Your First Kiss, Charlie Brown (1977) when she was named Heather. She also does not resemble the "Heather" version in any way; that version last appeared in the 1988 special Snoopy!!! The Musical.

== Music score ==
The majority of the music score in A Charlie Brown Valentine consists of classic melodies composed by Vince Guaraldi, some tunes which had only been utilized once ("Heartburn Waltz"). Other more notable tunes, such as "Charlie Brown Theme", "Peppermint Patty" and a jazz/rock version of the franchise signature tune, "Linus and Lucy", were used as well. All themes were performed and arranged by David Benoit.

1. "Heartburn Waltz" (version 1)
2. "Peppermint Patty" (version 1)
3. "Pebble Beach" (version 1)
4. "Linus and Lucy"
5. "Blue Charlie Brown"
6. "Heartburn Waltz" (version 2)
7. "Heartburn Waltz" (version 3)
8. "Peppermint Patty" (version 2)
9. "Heartburn Waltz" (version 4)
10. "Oh, Good Grief" (version 1) (Vince Guaraldi, Lee Mendelson)
11. "Heartburn Waltz" (version 5)
12. "Pebble Beach" (version 2)
13. "Heartburn Waltz" (version 6)
14. "You're in Love, Charlie Brown" (version 1)
15. "Heartburn Waltz" (version 7)
16. "Charlie Brown Theme" (version 1) (Vince Guaraldi, Lee Mendelson)
17. "Oh, Good Grief" (version 2) (Vince Guaraldi, Lee Mendelson)
18. "Heartburn Waltz" (version 8)
19. "Charlie Brown Theme" (version 2) (Vince Guaraldi, Lee Mendelson)
20. "You're in Love, Charlie Brown" (version 2)
21. "Linus and Lucy"
22. "Oh, Good Grief" (version 3) (Vince Guaraldi, Lee Mendelson)
23. "Heartburn Waltz" (version 9)

== Release ==
A Charlie Brown Valentine was first broadcast on February 14, 2002. The special was then released to VHS and DVD on January 6, 2004 along with two bonus specials, There's No Time for Love, Charlie Brown and Someday You'll Find Her, Charlie Brown, retailing at $14.98.

Although it originally aired on ABC, the network edits a few parts out to make time for station commercials, with the original version of the special being 25 minutes. In December 2010, Warner Home Video re-released the special on DVD with Someday You'll Find Her, Charlie Brown as a bonus special.

On October 7, 2025, it was re-released on the DVD and Blu-Ray collection Peanuts: 75th Anniversary Ultimate TV Specials Collection along with 39 other Peanuts specials.

== Reception ==
A Charlie Brown Valentine received a positive response from critics. It attracted 5.36 million viewers when rebroadcast on February 8, 2008. placing it at No. 2 on the primetime TV ratings for that night. In 2009, it was re-aired by ABC on Valentine's Day, immediately after Be My Valentine, Charlie Brown (1975). In 2010, it was viewed by 7.51 million viewers coming in at No. 2 timeslot.
