= Bleep and Booster =

British children's TV cartoon series (1964–1969)

Bleep and Booster annual

Bleep and Booster is a children's cartoon series by William Timym (pronounced Tim) originally shown on the BBC's Blue Peter. A total of 44 five-minute episodes comprising 10 separate stories were produced for television between 3 February 1964 and 6 November 1969; the stories then continued in the yearly Blue Peter Books, ending with the Fourteenth Book in 1977.

Bleep is an alien from the planet Miron/Myron with a spaceship, whilst Booster is a young human who travels with Bleep performing galactic missions for Bleep's moustached father.

The planet Miron/Myron is portrayed as being built almost entirely out of chrome, with its capital at Miron/Myron City. The inhabitants are portrayed as robot-like creatures with flexible arms and legs like rubber hoses. Their feet are cupped and they have antennae and a third eye in the centre of their foreheads.

Two episodes of the series, The Giant Brain and Solaron were released in 1993 on VHS in the UK by PolyGram Video. No other episodes have been released since then.

The cartoons were filmed with animatics: still pictures that were slowly panned, with narration by Peter Hawkins. The theme music was realised by Brian Hodgson at the BBC Radiophonic Workshop, sampling the opening of "Vibration" (1962; aka "The Visitor from Inner Space") by Tom Dissevelt.

== TV stories ==
- Story 1 (1964-02-03 – 1964-03-16) – 4 episodes
- Story 2 (1964-09-14 – 1964-10-01) – 4 episodes
- Story 3 – Bleep and Booster on Sirius (1964-12-31 – 1965-01-11), 4 episodes
- Story 4 – Bleep and Booster on Pegasus (1965-03-29 – 1965-04-08), 4 episodes
- Story 5 – Bleep and Booster on Numa (1965-10-04 – 1965-10-14), 4 episodes
- Story 6 – Bleep and Booster on Miron One (1966-04-18 – 1966-04-28), 4 episodes
- Story 7 – Bleep and Booster on E.W.C.O.S 9 (1966-11-21 – 1966-12-01), 4 episodes
- Story 8 – (1967-10-19 – 1967-11-02), 5 episodes
- Story 9 – Solaron (1968-10-14 – 1968-10-31), 6 episodes
- Story 10 – The Giant Brain (1969-10-23 – 1969-11-06), 5 episodes
