= William Timym =

British artist

- Born: 5 October 1902; Vienna, Austria
- Died: 31 May 1990 (aged 87)
- Education: Academy of Fine Arts Vienna
- Known for: Painter, Animator, Sculptor
- Notable work: Bleep and Booster

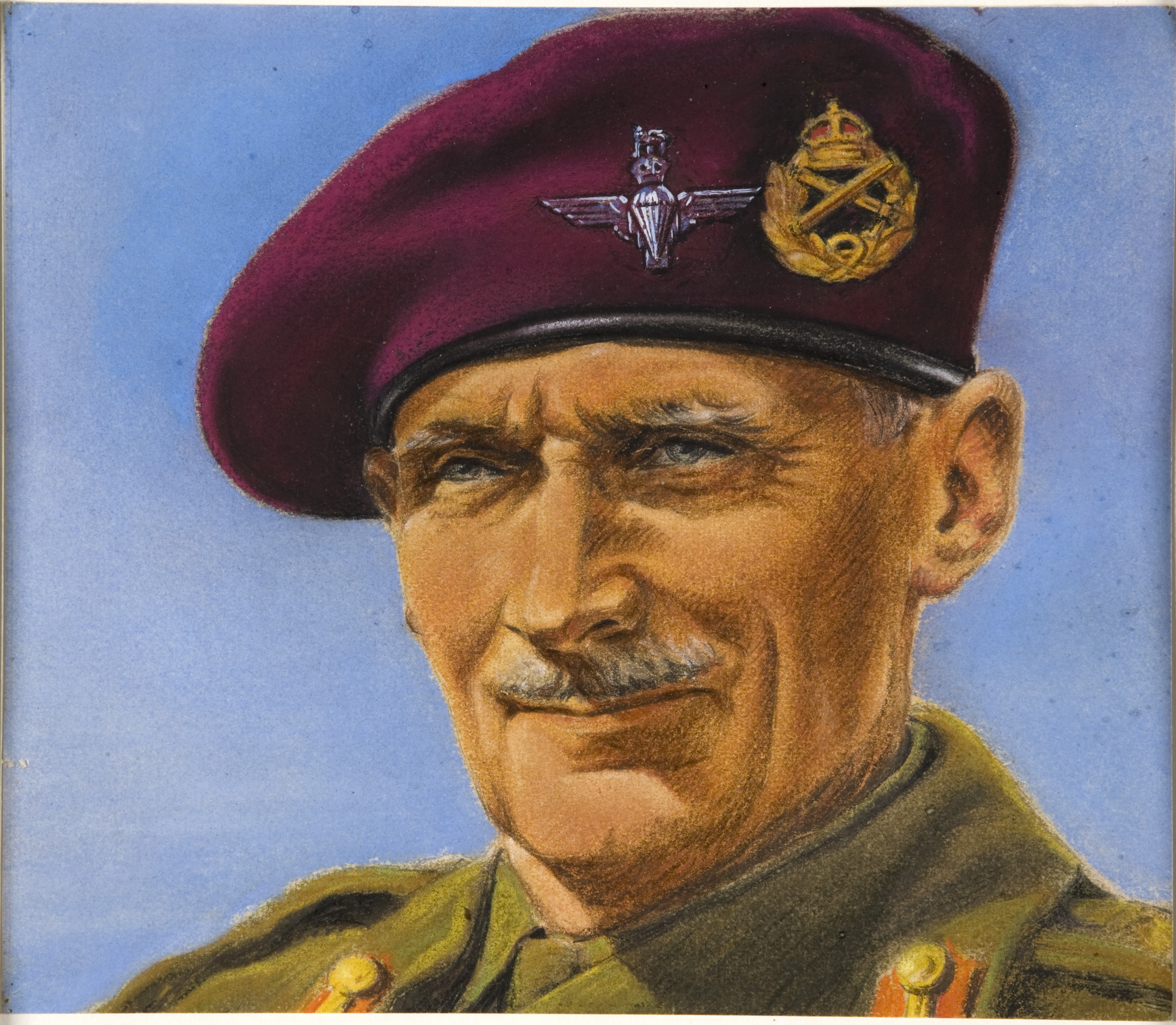
Timym's portrait of General Montgomery created during the Second World War for the Ministry of Information

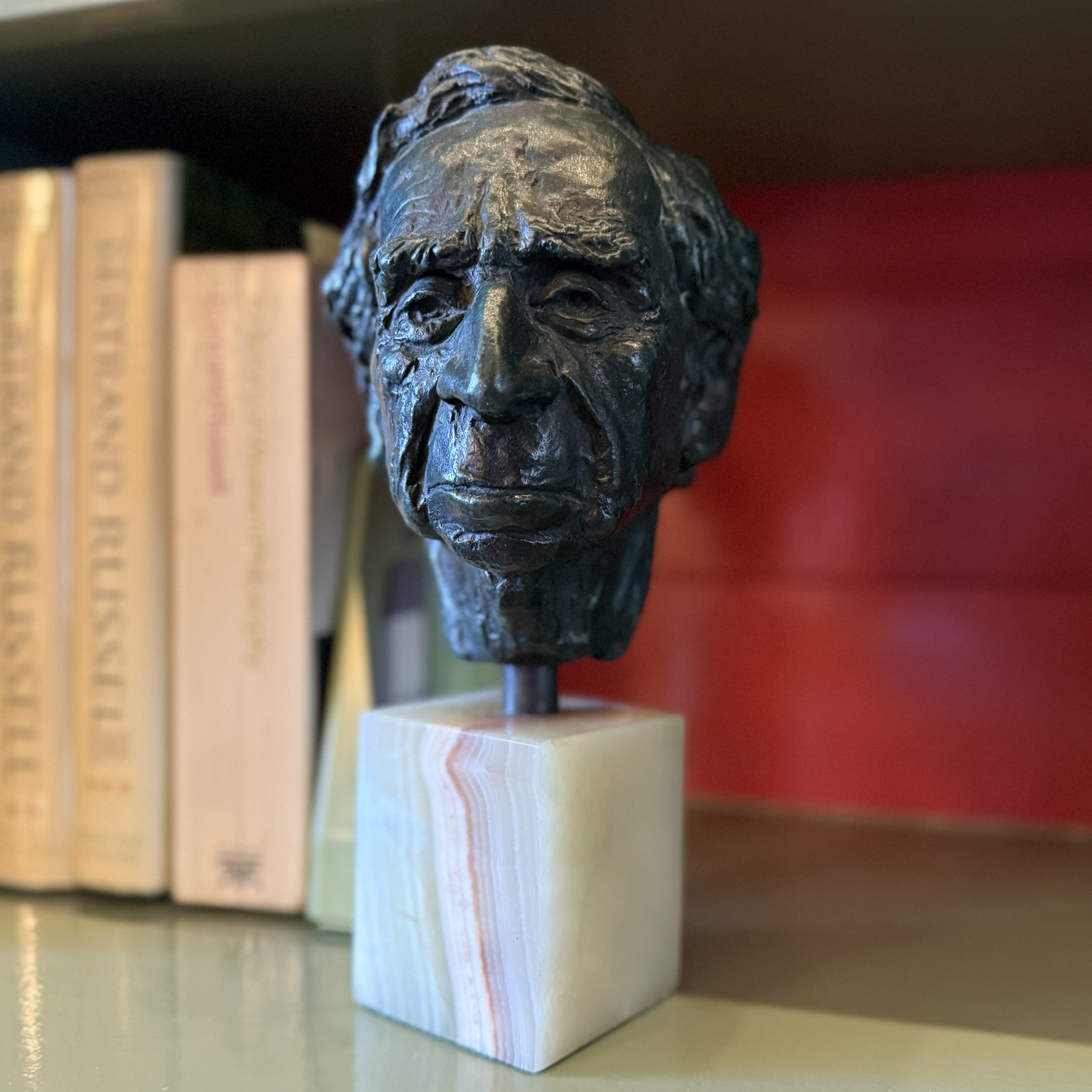
William Timym, signed and numbered Bronze Head of Bertrand Russell, second cast of an edition of nine casts (June 1970). Bronze on a Onyx Base, 23.5 x 12 x 13.3cm.

William Timym, MBE (1902–1990) was an artist whose best known work is probably the Bleep and Booster cartoons for the BBC's Blue Peter.

Timym (pronounced Tim) was Austrian, grew up in Vienna and studied at the Academy of Fine Arts Vienna. He moved to England in 1938 because of the Nazi occupation of Austria and during the Second World War produced a number of works for the Ministry of Information.

He became a naturalised British citizen in April 1949.

He was also a bronze sculptor and created many realistic (rather than stylised) wildlife sculptures. His sculptures include a statue of Blue Peter's dog Petra, a lion bust at Gloucester's Nature in Art museum, a lifesize Sumatran rhinoceros at Howletts Wild Animal Park in Canterbury, a signed and numbered portrait bust of Bertrand Russell, and a 15 ft (4.6 m) elephant fountain at Saint Louis Zoo. Other cartoons he produced include Bengo the Boxer puppy and Wuff, Snuff and Tuff.
