= Flight of the White Wolf =

- 走れ！白いオオカミ
- Directed by: Tsuneo Maeda
- Screenplay by: Wataru Kenmochi
- Story by: Mel Ellis
- Based on: Flight of the White Wolf by Mel Ellis
- Produced by: Shigeji Tsuiki
- Cinematography: Shigeru Sugimura; Isamu Kumata; Shinsuke Eguchi
- Edited by: Masashi Furukawa
- Music by: Antonín Dvořák
- Production companies: Group TAC; Toho
- Distributed by: Toho
- Release date: April 28, 1990 (Japan)
- Running time: 82 minutes
- Country: Japan
- Language: Japanese

Flight of the White Wolf (走れ！白いオオカミ, Hashire! Shiroi Ōkami) is a 1990 anime film directed by Tsuneo Maeda.

== Plot ==
Set in 1970s Wisconsin, the story begins at the Clagg residence where dog trainer Cal Clagg, his family, and Mr. Shott are celebrating a third championship victory for the latter's dog, Bo. As they are celebrating, Bo wanders near the Clagg's pet wolf, Gray, and is attacked and killed by Gray. Gray escapes and Cal's teenage son, Russet, runs after him in the nearby forest. Russet arrives at a cabin where he waits for Gray during the night. Russet is surprised to see Gray back away whenever he tries to get close, but the wolf still follows him. The next morning as they head back to the house, Shott has assembled a hunting party to kill the wolf and to find Russet, whom they presume dead. Frightened for Gray, Russet rushes back into the forest as Gray follows. That night Russet and Gray return home, and Russet tells his parents that he plans to lead Gray north to the Nicolet National Forest where Gray can be safe with other wolves, to which they reluctantly agree.

Later that night, as Russet and Gray cross a highway, Gray is nearly hit by a semi-trailer truck. The next morning, Russet overhears highway patrol officers mention the truck driver seeing a white wolf and call in Mr. Shott. As Russet and Gray head further north, they are intercepted by Shott in a helicopter. Shott gives chase to Gray and fires his rifle several times, unable to kill him. Separated, Russet rubs his sent on trees with the hope Gray will find him. Gray finds him that night and the two rest without interruption. After traveling all day the next, Russet options to head into town and buy food for Gray and himself. While in town he learns the hunting party has been called off. The next night Russet heads out to Tigerton to buy more food and gives his parents a call, updating them on his progress. On his way back to camp he finds a dead calf, killed by Gray. The two immediately leave. The next day, Russet realizes Gray has gone back to the calf for food and rushes back. When he reaches Gray, he finds the wolf has been caught in a bear trap. Russet removes the trap's chain from a stake and the two move on.

The following morning, Mr. Shott and local police discover that Gray has escaped the trap, much to their confusion. Russet leads Gray into water to hide their scents, but Gray collapses on a nearby beaver dam. Just as suddenly, Mr. Shott's hunting party arrives, but their view of the two is blocked by the dam. Russet removes the bear trap from Gray, being the closest he's gotten to the wolf in days. Russet applies first aid to Gray's leg and gives him food. Gray recovers from his fever and fatigue, but still suffering a limp, and the two march on northward. The following day Mr. Shott finds them and is surprised to see Russet alive, and understands how Gray escaped the trap. He aims his rifle to shoot the wolf, but Russet blocks him and confides that Gray is his best friend. Russet tells Shott his plan to let Gray go and be a free wolf. Shott is persuaded and lets them go. He tosses Bo's dog tag after.

Eventually, Russet and Gray reach the Nicolet National Forest. There, a fully healed Gray allows Russet to pet him and say goodbye. Russet watches Gray head into the forest to be free with the other wolves.

As the credits roll, we see Gray run with the other wolves in the forest, and Russet calls his parents to let them know of his success.

== Voice Cast ==
- Katsumi Toriumi as Russ Clagg
- Gorō Naya as Shott
- Hiroshi Arikawa as Cal
- Tomoko Munakata as Emily

== Release and reception ==
It was distributed theatrically in Japan by Toho on April 28, 1990. The film was released directly to home video by Columbia Pictures Home Video/Genesis as White Fang in 1994 in the United States.

In Japan, Flight of the White Wolf received the award for Best Animated Film at the Mainichi Film Concours.
