= Gude Crest =

1990 film by Kazuhito Kikuchi

Gude Crest - The Emblem of Gude
- Directed by: Kazuhito Kikuchi
- Based on: A fantasy novel by Reiko Hikawa
- Produced by: Tairiku Shobu; Hiroshi Takao; Yoshiaki Aihara
- Starring: Kazue Ikura; Naoko Matsui
- Music by: Shoji Honda
- Production companies: MTV; J.C.Staff
- Release date: June 23, 1990
- Running time: 45 minutes
- Country: Japan
- Language: Japanese

Gude Crest - The Emblem of Gude (女戦士エフェ&ジーラ グーデの紋章, Onna Senshi Efe & Jīra: Gūde no Monshō; "Female Soldiers Efe & Jira: Crest of Gude") is a 1990 one-shot anime. The anime, based on the fantasy novel series Onna Senshi Efera to Jiriora by Reiko Hikawa, runs for 45 minutes and was produced by J.C.Staff and by Tairiku Shobu (大陸書房). It was published in English by ADV Films. Enoki Films USA licensed the series as Jun and Sarah: Sacrifice of the Evil Spirit.

Jonathan Clements and Helen McCarthy, authors of The Anime Encyclopedia, Revised & Expanded Edition: A Guide to Japanese Animation Since 1917, described the work as being "in the spirit of the later Slayers".

== Characters ==
Clements and McCarthy describe the main characters, Efera and Jiliora, as being "modeled rather obviously on the Dirty Pair".

- Efera
  - In the Japanese version, she is Efe (エフェ). Enoki Films named her Princess Juniana "Jun".
- Jiliora
  - In the Japanese version, she is Jeila (ジーラ Jīra). Enoki Films named her Lady Saraphina-Effra "Sarah".
- Orlin (オーリン Ōrin)
  - A friend of Efera and Jiliora who helps them escape. Named Orin by Enoki Films.
- Kilian (キリアン Kirian)
  - Kilian is a boy who helps Efera and Jiliora escape. He dies. Named Kirian by Enoki Films.
- Yurion (ユリオン)
  - Kilian's brother.
- Rubiera (ルビエラ)
  - Kilian's sister.
- Baron Celdion (セルディオン Serudion)
  - A man planning to take over various places.
- Holy Supreme Mother (皇母)
  - An evil goddess. Named Kira by Enoki Films.
