= Dutch Schaefer =

Fictional character featured in the Predator and Alien vs. Predator franchises

- Predator and Alien vs. Predator character
- Major Alan "Dutch" Schaefer played by Arnold Schwarzenegger in Predator (1987)
- First appearance: Predator (1987)
- Last appearance: Predator: Killer of Killers (2025)
- Created by: Jim and John Thomas
- Portrayed by: Arnold Schwarzenegger
- Voiced by: Arnold Schwarzenegger (Predator: Hunting Grounds); James Patrick Cronin (Predator: Stalking Shadows audiobook)

In-universe information
- Full name: Alan Schaefer
- Nickname: Dutch
- Species: Android; Cyborg; Human
- Gender: Male
- Title: Agent Onyx
- Occupation: Soldier; Mercenary; OWLF agent; Space marine
- Affiliation: United States Army Special Forces; OWLF (Other Worldly Life Forms Program); United States Colonial Marine Corps
- Family: John Schaefer (brother)
- Relatives: Psi-Judge Schaefer (great-great-granddaughter)
- Nationality: Austrian-American

Major Alan "Dutch" Schaefer, commonly known simply as Dutch, is a fictional character in the Predator and Alien vs. Predator franchises, played by Arnold Schwarzenegger in the film Predator (1987) and the video game Predator: Hunting Grounds (2020), and voiced by James Patrick Cronin in the audiobook for Predator: Stalking Shadows (2020). A United States Army special forces operator, he first encounters the eponymous monster in Predator when it massacres his crew of mercenaries in Val Verde, before he is recruited to join the OWLF (Other Worldly Life Forms Program) to hunt Predators in Predator: South China Sea (2008), Stalking Shadows and Hunting Grounds, as Agent Onyx. Centuries following his death, Dutch returns rebuilt as a synthetic android major in the United States Colonial Marine Corps in the video game Alien vs. Predator (1994).

The character has received a universally positive critical reception.

== Fictional character biography ==
=== In Predator (1987) ===
In Predator (1987), Major Alan "Dutch" Schaefer is introduced as a highly skilled and experienced special forces operator who served in Vietnam during the Battle of Huế with CIA officer Al Dillon, now the leader of a mercenary group who operated in Afghanistan. After Dillon recruits Dutch and his team to go on a mission to Val Verde, purportedly to rescue a foreign cabinet minister and his aide from insurgents. En route, the team discovers the wreckage of a helicopter and three skinned corpses, whom Dutch identifies as Green Berets that he knew, leading him to become suspicious of Dillon's intentions. After the team reaches the guerilla camp and witness the execution of a hostage, Dutch leads them in mounting an attack, killing most of the rebels and several Soviet intelligence officers. Dutch confronts Dillon, who reveals their true mission was to stop a planned Soviet-backed invasion, the CIA having sent the Green Berets weeks earlier.

After capturing the only surviving guerilla, Anna, and learning more rebels are coming, the team choose to trek to their extraction point on-foot. Unbeknownst to them, they are stalked by a Predator, employing a cloaking device and thermal imaging technology, who kills one of Dutch's team while Anna is attempting to escape. After another team member is killed by the Predator's plasma cannon, everyone is provoked to blindly fire their weapons into the jungle, unknowingly wounding the Predator. Regrouping and realizing they are being hunted, Dutch and his commandoes make camp for the night and set traps, which are triggered by a wild boar. Dutch later realizes that their enemy uses the trees to travel and frees Anna, who states that her people had seen similarly mutilated bodies before. The next day, the group constructs a net trap and captures the Predator, but it frees itself, killing everyone but Dutch and Anna as they flee. Realizing it does not attack unarmed individuals, Dutch tells the unarmed Anna to get to the chopper, before attempting to distract the Predator by fleeing, ending up followed to a muddy riverbank and covered in mud. The Predator fails to see him and leaves to collect trophies from the others. Dutch realizes the cool mud provided camouflage for his body heat. He crafts makeshift traps and weapons, and as he covers his body with additional mud for camouflage, before luring the Predator out at night with a war cry and torch.

Dutch lightly injures the Predator and disables its cloaking device as the Predator fires wildly into the forest, and tries to escape, but accidentally falls into the river, where the water dissolves his muddy camouflage. As the Predator corners Dutch, it removes its mask and plasma cannon to fight him hand-to-hand, having deemed him a worthy opponent. Despite being overpowered, outsmarted, battered, and bathed in his own blood he vomited, Dutch attempts to goad the Predator into a booby trap he feels it won't see. It goes around after realising what Dutch was attempting to do, with this Dutch realises the counterweight is direct above the Predator and kicks the supporting stick making the counterweight fall to earth, crushing the Predator. With the monster mortally wounded, he asks it, "What the hell are you?". The Predator repeats the question back to Dutch and activates its self-destruct device, imitating Billy's laugh as it counts down. Upon realizing what it has done, Dutch runs for cover and survives the explosion. He is then rescued by the extraction helicopter, with Anna already safely on board, though he is left traumatized by the experience.

=== In Predator 2 (1990) ===
In the novelisation of Predator 2 (1990), Dutch is revealed to have been spoken to by Agent Peter Keyes of the OWLF as he was infirmed in a hospital, suffering from radiation sickness from how close he had been to the Predator's explosion at the conclusion of Predator. Dutch is said to have escaped from the hospital, never to be seen again.

=== In Alien vs. Predator (1994) ===
In Alien vs. Predator (1994), Dutch returns rebuilt as a synthetic android centuries following his death, with an enhanced cybernetic arm with a smart gun mounted on it, replicating one Dutch had installed as a human when he lost his arm. Having once again risen to the rank of Major in the United States Colonial Marine Corps, partnered with cybernetically enhanced Lieutenant Linn Kurosawa, Dutch and Linn are deployed to the city of San Drad, California after it is overrun with an army of xenomorphs, before they are abandoned by their superiors after their forces are seen to be too great. Just as Dutch and Lynn are about to be killed by a swarm of the xenomorph drones, a pair of Predators appear and destroy the xenomorphs, before offering an alliance with the two Marines in order to stop the alien infestation.

After destroying the xenomorph hive, Dutch and his team discover the xenomorph presence on Earth was the result of a bio-war project headed by the renegade General Bush of the Weyland-Yutani Corporation. Boarding Bush's military ship as it lifts off, Dutch, Lynn, and the Predator kill the Xenomorph Queen after it kills Bush, and program the ship to crash into San Drad, triggering a huge explosion that eliminates all xenomorph life on Earth. The Predator then gives Dutch and Lynn their wrist blades in recognition of their skills as warriors, before the Predator depart back into space; after Linn asks the Predator why they chose to help, their vague reply makes her and Dutch wonder whether they will have to fight them the next time they return to Earth.

=== In Predator: South China Sea (2008) ===
In Predator: South China Sea (2008), set years following the events of Predator, Dutch is depicted as "Agent Onyx", who had mentored former United States Special Forces operative John Gustat in killing Predators after Gustat's wife and son had been killed by one, before tracking one down to an illegal hunting preserve on a private island in the South China Sea.

=== In Predator: Hunting Grounds (2020) ===
In Predator: Hunting Grounds (2020), set before his death, a series of tape recordings tell of Dutch's adventures between the events of Predator and Hunting Grounds: after being interviewed by Agent Peter Keyes, Dutch became obsessed with uncovering more about its species, ultimately learning it had been visiting Earth for "a very long time". By 1996, Dutch had set up yet another private military company dedicated to performing search and rescue operations, recruiting "haunted soldiers" whom he used as "bait" in his hunt for another Predator, eventually encounter one in the Congo; in their subsequent encounter, Dutch's team and the Predator were killed after one of his own stray bullets caught a crate of RPG ammunition, and Dutch faked his own death to avoid the OWLF, fleeing with a retrieved Predator weapon. By the events of Predator 2, Dutch made his way to Los Angeles on deducing the current gang war and heat wave would be the perfect conditions for Predator activity, arriving in the city shortly after the film's events. After being recaptured by the OWLF, he used his stolen Predator technology to pressure the OWLF to "work with them, not for them" in the pursuit of Predators; over the following decade, Dutch and the OWLF became good at hunting and killing Predator in the middle of their hunts, retrieving more and more of their technology than ever before, before in 2008, Dutch had been spared by a female Predator, who freed him from her netgun and disappeared into the jungle, leaving Dutch with a permanent grid shaped scar on the right side of his face, and a different image of how the Predator operated. By 2018, Dutch is established as having been present as an offscreen character during the events of The Predator, present when the "Fugitive Predator" was captured by Project Stargazer, run by Cullen Yutani.

By 2025, the present-day narrative of Hunting Grounds, Dutch had begun working with the newly reinstated OWLF; after an encounter with another Predator had left him critically wounded, he agreed to an experimental treatment to bond his DNA with that of a Predator (as in Predator: Concrete Jungle), allowing him to continue fighting as a young man would at the age of 78, working with Peter Keyes' son Sean, and former Israel Defense Forces sniper Isabelle Nissenbaum, who had previously been abducted to a "game reserve" planet (in Predators).

=== In Predator: Stalking Shadows (2020) ===
In Predator: Stalking Shadows (2020), following the events of Predator 2, Dutch chokes out U.S. Marine Scott Devlin after he comes across him recovering the hand Mike Harrigan had severed from the "City Hunter" Predator, Over the course of the following years, bridging the events of Predator 2 and Hunting Grounds, Dutch continues to track Predator incursions around the world, working in collusion with OWLF and assembling a new team of mercenaries to combat the creatures. During one such engagement in Malaysia, his group succeeds in killing a new, much more agile type of Predator, albeit at the cost of several men, collecting its remains and any technology they can recover before making for home, which happens to be the base at which Devlin is stationed. Dutch subsequently arrives on the scene following Predator hunts in Scotland and Mexico, which Devlin is also present for; placing his trust in Dutch, following the latter incident, Dutch approaches Devlin and reveals the truth behind the killings, recruiting him to his cause. Now promoted to the rank of captain, Devlin leads his unit in support of Dutch and his mercenaries on another operation in Mexico, securing a downed Predator craft and killing one its occupants. Following the incident, Dutch disappears.

When Scott finally hears from Dutch again several years later, he learns Dutch's team was wiped out by a female Predator in Laos, which then spared him to live with the shame of defeat. After saving Dutch from an attempted assassination, apparently organized by the Men in Black (MIB), who are also investigating the Predators, Scott once again falls out of contact with him until another operation in Venezuela, in which they once again find evidence of Predator activity before running into a team of MIBs. As the two groups face off, they are ambushed by the two Predators responsible, which kill most of those present. Devlin is severely wounded but saved by Dutch, who finishes off the surviving Predator with one of their own hand-held energy weapons. After Devlin recovers from his wounds, he is recruited by Dutch to run the OWLF's new operations command center, established in light of an increasing number of Predators. Sometime later, in his office, Scott receives word from Dutch on an ongoing Predator hunt in China.

=== In Predator: Killer of Killers (2025) ===
Dutch appears captive (by a group of dishonorable Yautja Bad Bloods) in suspended animation with Ursa, Naru and Harrigan.

== Cancelled appearances ==
In the development of Predator 2 (1990), director Stephen Hopkins originally envisioned the film as a Patrick Swayze and Arnold Schwarzenegger buddy cop film, with the latter reprising his role as Dutch. Due to a dispute over salary and scheduling conflicts with Terminator 2: Judgment Day (1991), Schwarzenegger declined to return to the sequel. In October 2004, Schwarzenegger was reported to be interested in reprising his role as Dutch in a cameo role in Alien vs. Predator (2004) should he have lost the recall election to become Governor of California, on the condition the filming of his cameo took place at his residence; however, Schwarzenegger ultimately won the election with 48.58% of the votes, being unavailable to participate in the film. Robert Rodriguez hoped to have Schwarzenegger cameo as Dutch in Predators (2010), revealed in his originally scripted ending to have joined a Predator hunting party, but this ultimately did not happen. In March 2011, Schwarzenegger revealed he was being considered to reprise his role as Dutch in a new Predator film, which ultimately entered development hell. Schwarzenegger also talked with Shane Black about potentially reprising his role as Dutch in a cameo role in The Predator (2018), in which he would have appeared in the final scene, saying "Come with me if you want to live." (a catchphrase of his Terminator character from the Terminator franchise) while inviting the protagonists to hunt Predators, but declined the cameo due to the short role it would have been. Relatives of Dutch, his brother John Schaefer and great-great-granddaughter Psi-Judge Schaefer, are respectively featured in the comic series Predator: Concrete Jungle (1989–1990) and Predator vs. Judge Dredd (1997).

== Merchandise ==
In 2013, NECA released an action figure collectable of Major Dutch Schaefer modelled off his appearance in Predator, while in 2018, NECA released a figure of Dutch based on his appearance in Alien vs. Predator. Also in 2018, an officially-licensed Predator brand of whiskey, named Dutch Bourbon Whiskey after Major Dutch Schaefer, was produced in collaboration between Fox Studios and the Silver Screen Bottling Company as promotion for The Predator (2018).

== Reception ==
Entertainment Weekly said of Arnold Schwarzenegger's performance as Dutch in Predator (1987) that he has "never been as manly as he was in this alien-hunting testosterone-fest". IGN complimented the character's status as a "satire of the action film genre [that is] highly critical of the[se] kinds of characters [in] big, macho action movies, and the superficial, unquestioningly heroic stories they appear in". ScrewAttack included Dutch on their 2011 list of top ten space marines in video games for his depiction in Alien vs. Predator (1994), while Deja Reviewer described the title of Predator as "apply[ing] to both the alien being [and] Dutch" himself.

== In popular culture ==
The line "Get to the choppa" used by Dutch in Predator was subsequently associated with Arnold Schwarzenegger, especially when Schwarzenegger said the line again in some of his later appearances, including The New Celebrity Apprentice and advertisements for the mobile video game Mobile Strike. Lieutenant Andrew Pierce – Christian Boeving's leading hero from the 2003 action film When Eagles Strike – was based on Schwarzenegger's image in the film. The line is also spoken by Dallas Howard (Steven Pasquale) in Aliens vs. Predator: Requiem (2007) and Nebraska Williams (Trevante Rhodes) in The Predator (2018). In the 2010 How It Should Have Ended episode "How Predator Should Have Ended" and the 2016 self-titled episode of After Credits, a parodic retelling of the events of Predator, Dutch is voiced by Daniel Baxter.

== Appearances ==
- Predator (1987 novelisation)
- Predator (1987)
- Predator (1987 video game)
- Predator 2 (1990 novelisation)
- Alien vs. Predator (1994)
- Predator: Dark River (1996)
- Sci-Fi Pinball (1999)
- Predator: South China Sea (2008)
- Predators: Beating the Bullet (2010)
- AVP: The Hunt Begins (2019)
- Predator: Hunting Grounds (2020)
- Predator: Stalking Shadows (2020)
- Predator: Eyes of the Demon: Aftermath (2022)
- Predator: Killer of Killers (2025)
