= Alien vs. Predator (arcade game) =

1994 video game

- Arcade flyer (art by Bengus)
- Developer: Capcom
- Publisher: Capcom
- Designers: Tetsuya Iijima; Toshihiko Uda; Jun Matsumura
- Programmers: Cham Cho Choy; Arikichi Kiyoko; Yoshihiro Kimura
- Artists: Yoko Fukumoto; Hisashi Kisanuki; Chika Iwai
- Composer: Hideki Okugawa
- Platform: Arcade
- Release: May 1994
- Genre: Beat 'em up
- Modes: Single-player, multiplayer
- Arcade system: CP System II

Alien vs. Predator (エイリアンVSプレデター) is a 1994 beat 'em up video game developed and released by Capcom for the CPS-2 arcade game system. It is based on the science fiction franchise of the same name. Introducing an original fighter to the game: Lt. Kurosawa, the players take control of up to three from the selection of four cyborgs and Predator characters in a battle against the Xenomorph hordes and rogue human soldiers.

The game was very well received by the public and media publications, but has only one home system release, included in the Capcom Home Arcade in 2019.

== Gameplay ==
Three-player co-op gameplay with both Predators and Linn Kurosawa.

Alien vs. Predator uses a control setup with an eight-directional joystick and three buttons: one to attack, one to jump, and one to shoot. The default cabinet for the game allows as many as three players to play simultaneously, although some smaller cabinets only accommodate two players. Four characters are available for the players' use: two cyborg soldiers, Major Dutch Schaefer and Lieutenant Linn Kurosawa; and two Predators, a Hunter and a Warrior.

Three of the four characters are equipped with a melee weapon: a katana for Linn, a bladed naginata staff for the Hunter, and an extendable-retractable spear/staff for the Warrior. Dutch has no such weapon, but can hit enemies with his cybernetic arm; in addition, he can hold and swing any melee weapon dropped by another character, instead of throwing it as the other playable characters do.

Each character is also equipped with a projectile weapon for ranged attacks. Linn uses a rapid-firing handgun, Dutch has a smart gun in his cybernetic arm, and the Predators both use shoulder-mounted energy weapons. Ammunition is represented by a meter near the bottom of the screen; when the meter is depleted, the character is unable to fire until it refills. Linn's ammunition refills the fastest and allows the most shots, but she is completely defenseless while she reloads. Dutch and the Predators can move and fight while waiting for their ammunition to refill, and unlike Linn's automatic pistol, their meters will gradually refill when not firing.

Assorted weapons such as grenade launchers and flamethrowers can be found or taken from fallen enemies, but these have a limited ammunition supply. The player can also find jewels for bonus points, or food and medicine to restore lost health.

== Plot ==
San Drad (Japanized English: San Dorado, サン・ドラド), California, has been overrun by the Xenomorphs, and the cybernetically enhanced Major Dutch Schaefer and Lieutenant Linn Kurosawa of the United States Colonial Marine Corps have been abandoned by their superiors and are cornered by a swarm of the Alien drones. Before they can be killed, a pair of the Predators appear and destroy the Aliens. The Predators offer an alliance with the two cyborgs in order to stop the Alien infestation.

The players take control of up to three of four characters: Dutch, Linn, a Predator hunter, and a Predator warrior, and battle the Aliens through seven stages. After destroying the Aliens' hive, the characters discover that the Alien presence on Earth is the result of a bio-war project headed by the renegade General Bush working for the Weyland-Yutani corporation. They board Bush's military ship as it lifts off, aiming to stop him from carrying out his breeding program any further. While Bush curses the protagonists for foiling his plans, the Alien Queen, having survived the previous encounter, kills him. After defeating the queen, the group programs the ship to crash into San Drad, triggering a huge explosion that eliminates all Alien life on Earth. The Predator Warrior then gives his wrist blades to Dutch and Linn in recognition of their skills as warriors, before the Predators depart back into space. Linn asks the Predators why they chose to help them, and the Predators' vague reply makes her and Dutch wonder whether they will have to fight them the next time they return to Earth.

== Characters ==
The game features four characters: two U.S. Colonial Marines that ally with a pair of Predators. Each character has varying levels of speed, strength and agility, and different attacks.

- Predator Warrior (プレデター・ウォリアー)—The older of the two Predators, the Warrior is a well-balanced and powerful character with no weaknesses; he boasts excellent reach, damage and priority in all of his attacks. Resembles Jungle Hunter from the movie Predator.
- Predator Hunter (プレデター・ハンター)—The Hunter is the younger of the two Predators. He plays similarly to the Warrior, but lacks the quick recovery and high priority in many of his attacks. However, he compensates with having a more damaging jumping dive attack and longer weapon and attack range with more attack power. Resembles City Hunter from Predator 2, though his plasmacaster is the same as Predator Warrior rather than resembling Jungle Hunter's.
- Major Dutch Schaefer (ダッチ・シェーファー)—Dutch is named after and roughly based on Arnold Schwarzenegger's character in the original Predator film. He is a human cyborg and has a cybernetic arm with a smart gun mounted on it. His attacks are powerful but slow and he dashes forward instead of jumping. Dutch is able to powerbomb enemies for massive damage.
- Lieutenant Linn Kurosawa (リン・クロサワ)—Linn is a human cyborg who uses a handgun and katana as weapons and can execute several martial arts attacks. She is faster and more agile than Dutch, but is less powerful and has a shorter reach with her regular combo.

== Development and release ==
The game was based on an early draft of a script for a film adaptation of the Alien vs. Predator comic book series following Machiko Noguchi, and was intended to have been a tie-in to the movie. Although the draft was later rejected in favor of a different script which entered development hell, later releasing in 2004 with a different story, Capcom had already completed the game intending for the film to be released around the time of the game's completion, and so the arcade game was released in 1994 with its own stand-alone storyline, the Machiko Noguchi character renamed Linn Kurosawa due to a lack of licensing from Dark Horse Comics, and Dutch Schaefer from the 1987 Predator film included as another playable character, alongside two Predators.

A 32X version was rumored to be in development, but never released. An unrelated Alien vs. Predator beat 'em up game for the Super Nintendo Entertainment System was developed by Jorudan and published by Activision. In 2019, Capcom announced that the game would be included on its Capcom Home Arcade dedicated console. A digital port for the Nintendo Switch was planned to be released following the game's inclusion on the Capcom Home Arcade, but the release was ultimately cancelled due to expiring licensing agreements with Disney.

== Reception ==
Alien vs. Predator has been very well received by critics. In Japan, Game Machine listed the game on their July 15, 1994 issue as being the third most-successful table arcade unit of the month, outperforming titles like Fantastic Journey and Puyo Puyo. In North America, RePlay reported AVP to be the most-popular arcade game at the time. Play Meter also listed the game to be the sixth most-popular arcade game at the time. GamePro gave it a maximum score of 5.0 in all four categories (graphics, sound, control, and fun factor). Electronic Gaming Monthly hailed it as "everything you'd expect from the makers of games like Street Fighter 2 and The Punisher." According to a GameSpot retrospective, Alien vs. Predator featured "gorgeous graphics and special effects" and "was quite an adventure and one hell of a coin cruncher."

In 2013, it was ranked as the 12th top beat 'em up video game of all time by Heavy.com and included among the best looking beat 'em up games from the 16-bit era by Kotaku. That same year, Arcade Sushi ranked it as the second best retro game in the genre, stating that "without a doubt, this is one of the greatest looking (and greatest playing), arcade beat 'em ups of all time."

According to Destructoid in 2009, Alien vs. Predator is an "arcade classic still fondly remembered by many today." Retro Gamer called it an "excellent game" and "an unconverted classic, which, in our opinion, stands tall as one of the very best examples of licence mash-up ever seen in a video game." In 2013, Capcom stated that more fans have been asking for it to receive an HD remake than for any other of their "retro" games. In 2015, Hardcore Gamer included it among the 200 best games of all time. In 2023, Time Extension included the game on their top 25 "Best Beat 'Em Ups of All Time" list.

== Legacy ==
Lt. Linn Kurosawa (described by Retro Gamer as "a Taki-resembling [although Taki came after] heroine with ninja reflexes and attacks") has made cameo appearances in some later Capcom games, namely Street Fighter Alpha 2, Street Fighter III: 2nd Impact, and Namco × Capcom (where Sylphie, the shopkeeper from Forgotten Worlds, transforms into Kurosawa as part of her super attack). Much of her design has been re-used for the Street Fighter series' popular character Ibuki, introduced in 1997 (who, incidentally, has a fellow ninja classmate and friend named Sarai Kurosawa), and she also resembles Simone from Capcom's and Psikyo's 2000 shooter Cannon Spike.

According to former Treasure designer Tetsuhiko "Han" Kikuchi, Mad Stalker: Full Metal Forth and the arcade Alien vs. Predator were the main inspirations for his 1996 beat 'em up Guardian Heroes. It was also one of the inspirations for the makers of River City Ransom: Underground.

In 2017, toy company NECA announced that they had gained the license to the video game, and would be producing figures based on its characters, starting with the Aliens and Predators. The figures came complete with retro packaging inspired by the game's arcade cabinet art. The following year, NECA revealed that they would also be releasing action figures of Linn and Dutch.
