= Predator vs. Judge Dredd =

Comic series

- Cover to Predator vs. Judge Dredd trade paperback

Publication information
- Publisher: Dark Horse Comics (U.S.); Fleetway Publications (U.K.)
- Schedule: Monthly
- Format: Miniseries
- Genre: Science fiction
- Publication date: October – December 1997

Creative team
- Written by: John Wagner
- Artist: Enrique Alcatena
- Colourist(s): Perry McNamee, Jimmy Johns, John Hanan III, Dave Stewart

Collected editions
- Judge Dredd vs. Predator: ISBN 1-84023-021-5
- Judge Dredd vs. Predator: ISBN 1-56971-345-6

Predator vs. Judge Dredd (or Pred vs Dred) is an intercompany crossover featuring the galaxy's greatest lawman and the galaxy's greatest hunter. It was originally published in 1997 in serial form in Judge Dredd Megazine and a three-issue miniseries by Dark Horse Comics. It was then collected as a trade paperback.

== Characters ==
- Judge Dredd
- Judge Schaefer, a Judge from Psi Division who is the great-great-granddaughter of Major Alan "Dutch" Schaefer (Arnold Schwarzenegger's character in the original film).

== Plot ==
The Predator enters the urban jungle of Mega-City One to hunt a challenging prey – the Judges themselves. As the Judges' heads start accumulating in the Predator's trophy room, it is down to Dredd and Schaefer to stop the hunt.

When discussing the Predator, the Judges say it had visited New York. This never happened in the film but did in the Predator comic book story Concrete Jungle, written by Mark Verheiden (which parallels a lot of the themes in the second film).

== Collections ==
The series has been collected as a trade paperback:

- Predator vs Judge Dredd, 80 pages, Titan, 1998, ISBN 1-84023-021-5
- Predator vs Judge Dredd, 80 pages, Dark Horse Comics, 1999, ISBN 1-56971-345-6
- Predator vs Judge Dredd vs Aliens, 176 pages, Dark House Comics, 2014, ISBN 1-61655-479-7
- Judge Dredd: The Complete Case Files 27, 304 pages, Rebellion, 2016, ISBN 1-78108-432-7

== See also ==
- Judge Dredd vs. Aliens
- Predator, the main comic book series
