= List of Predator novels =

The Predator novels are an extension of the Predator franchise, the most recent are published by Dark Horse Comics under their DH Press imprint. The first novel in the new series, Predator: Forever Midnight, was released in 2006 and proved a success (selling 1,000 copies a month) leading to further volumes being commissioned.

== Novelizations ==
Title	Author	Publisher	Date	Length	Plot
Predator	Paul Monette	Jove	June 1st 1987	200 pp	From the author of Scarface comes this explosive adventure. "Dutch" Schaefer heads an elite CIA paramilitary rescue team chosen for a simple, one-day job in the Central American highlands. But there's another kind of hunt going on in the jungle, and one by one Schaefer's men are picked off by an unseen predator.
Predator 2	Simon Hawke	Jove	December 1, 1990	231 pp	
Predator: Concrete Jungle	Nathan Archer	Bantam Books	April 1, 1995	306 pp	During a blistering heat wave in New York, police begin to discover evidence of a sadistic killer. Detective John Schaefer, the brother of Dutch Schaefer (Arnold Schwarzenegger) from the first Predator film, quickly learns it is the extraterrestrial hunters, drawn by the heat and the prey.
Predator: Cold War	Nathan Archer	Bantam Spectra	March 31, 1997	272 pp	When a Predator spacecraft crashlands in the isolated Northern tundra of Siberia, John Schaefer is called upon once again to aid the US military in capturing the technology. Unfortunately, the Russian forces have their eyes on the craft as well.
The Predator: Hunters And Hunted Official Movie Prequel	James A. Moore	Titan Books	July 31, 2018	322 pp	
The Predator	Christopher Golden, Mark Morris	Titan Books	September 18, 2018	320 pp	

== Original novels ==
=== Predator: Big Game (1999) ===
U.S. Army Corporal Enoch Nakai must rediscover his Navajo roots in a fight to the death with an alien Predator.

=== Predator: Forever Midnight (2006) ===
Parts of the story are told from the viewpoint of the Predators. In particular the author John Shirley had to expand the Predator language and created his own name and culture for the Predator race, the "Hish."

=== Predator: Flesh and Blood (2007) ===
Andar Ciejek, son of the patriarch to one of the wealthiest (human) families, was a simple man trying to create a life separate from the greed tainting his family. But, when the patriarch dies, Andar is brought back into the fold for the reading of his father's will, but another family member has led the ruthless and blood-thirsty Predators to the planet where the will-reading is taking place in the hopes that they would kill every last living Ciejek and leave him to be the sole heir, but he may have gotten more than he bargained for.

=== Predator: Turnabout (2008) ===
Alaska is lovely in the spring: the plants start to come back, the snow begins to melt, the bears start to come out of hibernation... it's all a bugle call to poachers across the world hoping to sack the biggest game they can find. And the Predators are no different.

=== Predator: South China Sea (2008) ===
A prize hunt has been arranged on a Southeast Asia island. When the compound is attacked and security personnel killed, the hunters battle for survival.

=== Predator: Incursion (2015) ===
Predator ships stream into human space in unprecedented numbers. The Colonial Marines, controlled by Weyland-Yutani, respond to the incursion, thus entering the Rage War. Incursion is the first novel in The Rage War trilogy by Tim Lebbon, which continues in Alien: Invasion and concludes in Alien vs. Predator: Armageddon. The trilogy as a whole centers around an invasion of the mainstream human civilization by the Rage, a dissident human faction that has successfully weaponized the Xenomorphs, with the Predators caught in the crossfire.

=== Predator: If It Bleeds (2017) ===
An anthology celebrating the 30th anniversary of the Predator franchise, If It Bleeds includes sixteen brand new, never before seen stories—exclusive to this collection—featuring the Predators throughout space and time. Based entirely on the original films, novels, and comics, Predator: If It Bleeds (a quote from the original movie) reveals the Predators stalking prey in 12th Century Japan, 9th Century Viking Norway, World War I, Vietnam, the Civil War, Hurricane Katrina, and the modern day, as well as across the far reaches of future space.

=== Predator: Stalking Shadows (2020) ===
This official prequel novel leads into the new PlayStation 4 video game Predator: Hunting Grounds from IllFonic. This novel is a bridge between Predator 2 and the current day continuity. U.S. Marine Scott Devlin takes on a new assignment that begins with the clean-up of a Los Angeles combat scene revealing what appears to be alien weapons and tech. His next mission, to an equatorial jungle, seems like an assault on a drug cartel until his team finds human bodies, skinned and suspended from the trees. Justifiably freaked out, Devlin digs deeper and discovers hidden truths, clandestine agencies, savage opponents... and an unexpected ally.

=== Predator: Eyes of the Demon (2022) ===
Another anthology like If It Bleeds. Includes fifteen new stories exclusive to the collection.

== Publications ==
- Predator (novelization by Paul Monette, Jove Books, June 1, 1987, ISBN 0-515-09002-6)
- Predator 2 (novelization by Simon Hawke, Jove Books, December 1, 1990, ISBN 0-515-10578-3)
- Predator: Concrete Jungle (by Nathan Archer, Bantam Books, May 1, 1995, ISBN 0-553-56557-5)
- Predator: Cold War (by Nathan Archer, Bantam Books, Reprinted edition March 31, 1997, ISBN 0-553-57493-0)
- Predator: Big Game (by Sandy Schofield, Bantam, February 2, 1999, ISBN 0-553-57733-6)
- Predator: Forever Midnight (by John Shirley, DH Press, May 23, 2006, ISBN 1-59582-034-5)
- Predator: Flesh And Blood (by Michael Jan Friedman and Robert Greenberger, DH Press, October 9, 2007, ISBN 1-59582-047-7)
- Predator: Turnabout (by Steve Perry, DH Press, March 11, 2008, ISBN 1-59582-054-X)
- Predator: South China Sea (by Jeff VanderMeer, DH Press, October 28, 2008, ISBN 1-59582-140-6)
- Predator: Incursion (by Tim Lebbon, Titan Books, October 20, 2015, ISBN 1783296240)
- Predator: If It Bleeds (anthology edited by Bryan Thomas Schmidt, Titan Books, October 17, 2017, ISBN 9781785655401)
- Predator: Stalking Shadows (by James A. Moore, Titan Books, May 13, 2020, ISBN 1789094410)
- Predator: Eyes of the Demon (anthology edited by Bryan Thomas Schmidt, Titan Books, August 9, 2022, ISBN 9781803360294)

== See also ==
- List of Alien (franchise) novels
- List of Predator (franchise) comics
- List of Alien vs. Predator novels
