= List of Alien vs. Predator novels =

The Alien vs. Predator novels are an extension of the fictional crossover franchise of Alien vs. Predator.

Beginning in 1994, Bantam Books began publishing a series of novels based on the original Aliens vs. Predator comic book series, published by Dark Horse Comics. This trilogy, dubbed The Machiko Noguchi Saga after the main character of the series, consists of Prey, Hunter’s Planet, and War. Both Prey and War are adaptations of Dark Horse Comics releases, whereas Hunter’s Planet is an original story.

Following the 2004 theatrical release of Alien vs. Predator, HarperEntertainment published a novelization of the movie.

After a hiatus, the literary franchise returned in 2016, with Titan Books beginning publication. The first Alien vs. Predator title released under Titan was Alien vs. Predator: Armageddon, which is the third and final installation of Tim Lebbon's The Rage War series. Titan then reissued Bantam’s original trilogy, compiled in The Complete Aliens vs. Predator Omnibus. In 2022, Titan published two Aliens vs. Predators titles. Ultimate Prey, an anthology featuring fifteen short stories, and Rift War.

== The Machiko Noguchi Saga ==
Cover artwork of the first novel in the trilogy.

The trilogy is centered on Machiko Noguchi, a human woman of Japanese descent who lived and hunted with members of the Predator species. She is both intelligent and athletic, and skilled in firearms, personal defence and martial arts. After the colony of Ryushi was destroyed, Machiko desired a life of hunting and honour, connecting with and coming to be seen as an honorary member of the Predator species, formally known as Da'dtou-di ("small knife"), "The Human Predator", while hunting the xenomorph species across the galaxy, and coming into conflict with "Shorty", a ruthless hunter who views her with contempt.

=== Aliens vs. Predator: Prey (1994) ===
A clan of Predators (known as "Yautja" in this series) 'seeds' the planet Ryushi with a clutch of Alien Eggs, intending to hunt the adult "Drone" stage of the "Xenomorphs". Chaos ruins the carefully planned hunt when Predator and Alien encounter Ryushi's human colonists, led by reluctant corporate executive Machiko Noguchi.

=== Aliens vs. Predator: Hunter's Planet (1994) ===
Noguchi receives an offer by a wealthy man named Livermore Evanston to attend his own hunter paradise on the planet Blior which will be known to Noguchi as the deadliest planet of all space.

=== Aliens vs. Predator: War (1996) ===
On a swamp planet, entitled Bunda, Noguchi must rescue human survivors who are in the middle of the Predator raid. The events of this story serve as a direct sequel to Prey and Aliens: Berserker, set before the events of Hunter's Planet. In a continuity error, Shorty is described as dying of his injuries at the end of the novel, prior to dying again in Hunter's Planet; this was later fixed in the comic series continuation Three World War, with an explanation of Noguchi and Shorty having dueled twice: once in War, and finally again in Hunter's Planet.

== Original novels ==
- Alien vs. Predator: Armageddon (2016)
- Aliens vs. Predators: Ultimate Prey (2022)
- Aliens vs. Predators: Rift War (2022)

== Publications ==
- Aliens vs. Predator: Prey (by Steve Perry and Stephani Perry, Bantam Books, 259 pages, May 1994, ISBN 0-553-56555-9)
- Aliens vs. Predator: Hunter's Planet (by David Bischoff, Bantam Books, 260 pages, December 1994, ISBN 0-553-56556-7)
- Aliens vs. Predator: War (by S.D. Perry, Bantam Books, 208 pages, December 1999, ISBN 0-553-57732-8)
- Alien vs. Predator: The Movie Novelization (by Marc Cerasini, HarperEntertainment, 282 pages, July 1, 2004, ISBN 0-060-73537-6)
- Alien vs. Predator: Armageddon (by Tim Lebbon, Titan Books, 320 pages, September 27, 2016, ISBN 1-783-29620-8)
- The Complete Aliens vs. Predator Omnibus – collects Prey, Hunter's Planet and War (Titan Books, November 29, 2016, ISBN 1-78565-199-4)
- Aliens vs. Predators: Ultimate Prey (anthology edited by Bryan Thomas Schimdt and Jonathan Maberry, Titan Books, 439 pages, March 1, 2022, ISBN 1-789-09794-0)
- Aliens vs. Predators: Rift War (by Weston Ochse and Yvonne Navarro, Titan Books (UK), 352 pages, August 16, 2022, ISBN 1-789-09844-0)

== See also ==
- List of Alien (franchise) comics
- List of Alien (franchise) novels
- List of Predator comics
- List of Predator (franchise) novels
- Aliens vs. Predator (comics)
- List of comics based on films
