= Kevin Peter Hall =

American actor (1955–1991)

- Born: May 9, 1955; Pittsburgh, Pennsylvania, U.S.
- Died: April 10, 1991 (aged 35); Hollywood, California, U.S.
- Education: Penn Hills High School; George Washington University
- Occupation: Actor
- Years active: 1978–1991
- Known for: Without Warning; Harry and the Hendersons; Predator (fictional species)
- Height: 7 ft 2 in (218 cm)
- Spouse: Alaina Reed Hall (m. 1988)

Kevin Peter Hall (May 9, 1955 – April 10, 1991) was an American actor. Standing 7 ft 2 in (2.18 m) tall, he frequently played monster characters. He was the original title character in the science fiction Predator franchise, appearing in the first 1987 film and its 1990 sequel. Hall also portrayed the eponymous Harry in the fantasy comedy film Harry and the Hendersons (1987), a role he reprised for the first season of the syndicated television adaptation (1990–1991). His human roles included Dr. Elvin "El" Lincoln on the NBC science fiction series Misfits of Science (1985–1986) and Warren Merriwether on the sitcom 227 (1989–1990).

== Early life ==
Hall was born in Pittsburgh, Pennsylvania. Hall came from a tall family. His father, Charles Hall, stood 6 ft 6 in (1.98 m), and his mother, Sylvia, stood 6 ft 2 in (1.88 m). At 7 ft 2 in (2.18 m), Hall was the tallest of his brothers, all of whom were at least 6 ft 5 in (1.96 m) tall.

During his high school years at Penn Hills High School, he was a star basketball player. He subsequently attended George Washington University in Washington, D.C., where he played for its basketball team and majored in theatrical arts.

After graduation, Hall moved to Venezuela to play professional basketball.

== Career ==
Due to Hall's height, he was often cast in monster roles. He made his acting debut in the 1979 horror film Prophecy. He appeared as the alien in the 1980 horror film Without Warning and as Gorvil in the 1982 television movie Mazes and Monsters. In 1985, he co-starred in the short-lived series Misfits of Science. He guest-starred on the sitcom Night Court as a huge but gentle mental patient who humorously towered over bailiff Bull Shannon, played by Richard Moll, who was 6 ft 8 in (2.03 m), and a fellow mental patient, played by James Cromwell, who is 6 ft 7 in (2.01 m). The next year, Hall portrayed yet another monster in the horror film Monster in the Closet, followed by the role of Harry, the Bigfoot, in Harry and the Hendersons.

In 1986, Hall was cast as the main antagonist and titular monster in Predator, opposite Arnold Schwarzenegger, Carl Weathers and Jesse Ventura. During its developmental stages, the Predator role was intended for Jean-Claude Van Damme. Due to Van Damme being shorter and less bulky than Schwarzenegger and other leading actors, producers ultimately decided to recast the role with Hall so that the Predator could appear more physically imposing. Hall also appeared unmasked as a helicopter pilot at the end of the film. Hall would go on to reprise the role in the 1990 sequel, this time opposite Danny Glover and Gary Busey.

Following his role in Predator, Hall appeared in the feature film Big Top Pee-wee (1988) and had a guest spot on Star Trek: The Next Generation; Hall had been one of the actors considered for the role of Geordi La Forge on the latter, before the role went to LeVar Burton. From 1989 to 1990, he had a recurring role on the NBC sitcom 227. In 1990, Hall reprised his role as Harry in the television series Harry and the Hendersons, based on the 1987 film of the same name. He died during the series' first season.

== Personal life and death ==
Hall met actress Alaina Reed while taping a guest role on the television show 227. The couple would marry both on the show and in real life.

While working on the TV series Harry and the Hendersons, Hall announced that he had contracted HIV from a blood transfusion during surgery for injuries he sustained in a car accident. He died from AIDS-related pneumonia on April 10, 1991.

== Honors ==
Hall was posthumously inducted into the Penn Hills Hall of Fame as part of the inaugural class on May 8, 2009.

== Filmography ==
| Year | Title | Role | Notes |
|---|---|---|---|
| 1979 | Prophecy | Mutant bear | Uncredited |
| 1980 | Without Warning | The Alien | Credited as Kevin Hall |
| 1982 | One Dark Night | Eddie | |
| 1982 | Mazes and Monsters | Gorvil | Television Movie |
| 1984 | The Wild Life | Bouncer | Credited as Kevin Hall |
| 1984 | E/R | Donald Haines | Episode: "Mr. Fix-It" |
| 1985 | Night Court | Wendell Martin | Episode: "Nuts About Harry" |
| 1985 | The Dukes of Hazzard | Floyd Malone | Episode: "Opening Night at the Boar's Nest" |
| 1985–1986 | Misfits of Science | Dr. Elvin "El" Lincoln | 16 episodes |
| 1986 | Monster in the Closet | Monster | |
| 1987 | Harry and the Hendersons | Harry | |
| 1987 | Predator | The Predator, Helicopter pilot | Double role |
| 1988 | Big Top Pee-wee | Big John | |
| 1989 | Rodney Dangerfield: Opening Night at Rodney's Place | Richard Small | Television special |
| 1989 | Shannon's Deal | Harry | Television movie |
| 1989 | Star Trek: The Next Generation | Leyor | Episode: "The Price" |
| 1989–1990 | 227 | Warren Merriwether | 11 episodes |
| 1990 | Predator 2 | The Predator, Elder Predator | Double role |
| 1990–1991 | Harry and the Hendersons | Harry | Main role |
| 1992 | Highway to Hell | Charon | Final film role |

== See also ==
- List of tallest people
