= Predators (2010 film) =

2010 film by Nimród Antal

- Theatrical release poster
- Directed by: Nimród Antal
- Written by: Alex Litvak; Michael Finch
- Based on: Characters by: Jim Thomas; John Thomas
- Produced by: Robert Rodriguez; John Davis; Elizabeth Avellán
- Starring: Adrien Brody; Topher Grace; Alice Braga; Walton Goggins; Laurence Fishburne
- Cinematography: Gyula Pados
- Edited by: Dan Zimmerman
- Music by: John Debney
- Production companies: 20th Century Fox; Troublemaker Studios; Davis Entertainment; Dune Entertainment
- Distributed by: 20th Century Fox
- Release dates: July 7, 2010 (International); July 9, 2010 (United States)
- Running time: 107 minutes
- Country: United States
- Language: English
- Budget: $40 million
- Box office: $127.2 million

Predators is a 2010 American science fiction action film directed by Nimród Antal and written by Alex Litvak and Michael Finch. It is the third installment in the Predator franchise and features an ensemble cast, including Adrien Brody, Topher Grace, Alice Braga, Walton Goggins, and Laurence Fishburne. The film follows a group of proficient killers who have been abducted and placed on a planet inhabited by extraterrestrial trophy hunters, leading them to try to survive and look for a way back to Earth.

Producer Robert Rodriguez had developed a script for a third installment as early as 1994 after seeing the original film, although it was not until 2009 that 20th Century Fox greenlit the project. According to Rodriguez, the title Predators is an allusion to the film Aliens (1986). The title also has a double meaning, referring both to the extraterrestrial Predator hunters and to the group of human characters who are pitted against them. Filming took place in locations including Hawaii and Austin, Texas from September 2009 and lasted 53 days.

Predators was released in the United States on July 9, 2010, by 20th Century Fox. It received mixed reviews from critics and grossed $127 million against a $40 million budget. A fourth film, The Predator, was released in 2018.

== Plot ==
Mercenary Royce is dropped from the sky into an unfamiliar jungle and meets several others who arrive the same way: Los Zetas enforcer Cuchillo, Spetsnaz Alpha Group soldier Nikolai, IDF sniper Isabelle, RUF officer Mombasa, San Quentin death row inmate Stans, Inagawa-kai Yakuza enforcer Hanzo, and physician Edwin. Following Royce, they discover a strange monument, empty cages, and deadfall traps set by a deceased U.S. Special Forces soldier. Upon seeing a sky with visible moons and planets, they realize they are not on Earth.

After surviving a coordinated attack by a pack of alien beasts, Royce theorizes that the planet is a game preserve and they are the prey. Cuchillo is killed and his body used to lure the group into a trap, which they evade. Tracking the beasts to a camp, they find a captive Predator. Three larger Predators—known as "Tracker", "Berserker", and "Falconer"—attack the group and kill Mombasa, while the others escape. Isabelle identifies the captive Predator as matching the description of a creature that killed a special operations team in Guatemala before being defeated by a lone survivor in 1987. (Note: As depicted in Predator (1987))

After setting a trap for the Predators but only attracting a different alien creature, the group encounters Ronald Noland, a U.S. Air Cavalry soldier who has survived alone for years by hiding and scavenging. He brings them to his hideout and explains that the Predators abduct worthy prey from other worlds, and that a blood feud exists between the larger and smaller Predators, which he likens to the difference between wolves and dogs. Royce devises a plan to free the captive Predator, hoping it will take them home.

The group fall asleep, and wake up to Noland attempting to suffocate them with smoke. Royce detonates an explosive, exposing the hideout to the Predators. Tracker locates and kills Noland, as the group escape. During the ensuing chase, Nikolai is wounded. He detonates several Claymores in Tracker's face, killing it and sacrificing himself. Berserker intercepts the survivors, but Stans distracts it long enough for the others to escape. Berserker kills Stans by ripping out his skull and spine, then dispatches Falconer to pursue the remaining humans. Hanzo stays behind to duel Falconer with a katana taken from Noland's hideout, killing it but sustaining mortal wounds in the process.

Royce, Isabelle, and Edwin press on until a trap leaves Edwin injured. When Isabelle refuses to abandon him, Royce proceeds without them. Berserker captures them and throws them into a pit. Royce returns to the camp and offers to free the captive Predator in exchange for transport to Earth. The Predator remotely activates its ship and sets a course for home. As Royce races to board, Berserker arrives and overpowers and decapitates the captive Predator before remotely destroying the ship as it lifts off, apparently killing Royce. Meanwhile, Edwin paralyzes Isabelle with a scalpel laced with a neurotoxic plant poison and reveals himself to be a serial killer and his intention to remain on the planet. Royce reappears, having changed his mind. Edwin attempts to ambush him, but is stabbed by his own scalpel. Royce booby-traps Edwin's paralyzed body and wounds Berserker. With Isabelle's help, Royce defeats and decapitates Berserker. The two finally introduce themselves to each other.

Spotting more parachutes descending from the sky and surmising that fresh prey is arriving, the pair head deeper into the jungle to find a way back to Earth.

== Cast ==
- Adrien Brody as Royce, an ex-U.S. Special Operations Forces veteran turned mercenary who reluctantly assumes leadership of the group of humans. Brody said he had been "blown away" by Predator and viewed his role as a challenge, wanting to bring a complexity to the character that would contrast with Schwarzenegger's role in the original film. He put on twenty-five pounds (11 kg) of muscle for the role, stating that "I want it to be entertaining and part of the ride that people see when they see a movie like that. But that's not really why I'm in it and that's not really what I brought to it. I brought the same kind of discipline that I would to a film like The Pianist." Antal and Rodriguez specifically wanted to avoid casting an actor physically similar to Schwarzenegger, wanting to "go in a very different direction" and reasoning that real-life soldiers are wiry and tough rather than burly. "We thought casting a physically 'Schwarzenegger-esque' character would have done the original film a disservice", said Antal, "and would have done this film a disservice because we are not trying to remake or copy the original film. I told everybody early on that I can make anybody look tough. What I can't do is teach them how to act". Brody has expressed interest in reprising his role in future sequels.
- Topher Grace as Edwin, a doctor who does not seem to belong amongst the group of hardened killers until he reveals that he is also a psychopathic murderer. Grace was dubious about taking the role when he read the script, "because I really liked the first Predator, but all the sequels haven't been as good. Then when I read this, I thought, 'What Aliens was to Alien, this is to Predator'. Because Predator never really got its due; it never really got that sequel". He compared Antal's approach to that of James Cameron, director of Aliens; remaining faithful to the original work but taking the concepts in slightly different directions. Grace performed some of his own stunts, including jumping off a waterfall.
- Alice Braga as Isabelle, a sniper from the Israel Defense Forces. She failed to save her spotter during a mission, and feels that she has been brought to the alien planet as punishment and to seek redemption. As the only female character, Isabelle plays the role of peacemaker: "My character, funny enough", said Braga, "is the one that is always trying to grab everyone together and like reuniting everyone and stopping the fights and saying that we have strength in numbers". Braga described the character as "a tough cookie … sweet inside but tough outside". She read a sniper manual to prepare for the role, and carried a fourteen-pound sniper rifle during shooting.
- Walton Goggins as Stans, a death row inmate from San Quentin State Prison who was scheduled to be executed in two days before suddenly finding himself on the alien planet. Responsible for 38 murders and an admitted rapist.
- Oleg Taktarov as Nikolai, a Russian commando from the Spetsnaz Alpha Group who was fighting in Chechnya before finding himself on the alien planet. Taktarov, a retired mixed martial artist and former Ultimate Fighting Champion, described his role as combining elements of Schwarzenegger, Jesse Ventura, and Bill Duke's characters from the original Predator film, and praised it as "the first time you get a really, really, positive, good Russian character in an American [film]". Taktarov used his martial arts training during some of the film's action sequences. While filming a scene he hit his face on a steadicam and was bleeding, but continued filming because the blood added to the effect of the scene.
- Laurence Fishburne as Noland, a United States Army Air Cavalry soldier who has survived on the alien planet for multiple hunting cycles. "It's a really interesting role," said Fishburne, "quite different from Morpheus [from The Matrix]. He's a bit shady, crazy, surviving on his own, kind of a ratty character."
- Danny Trejo as "Cuchillo", a ruthless enforcer for the feared Los Zetas Mexican drug cartel who carries twin submachine guns.
- Louis Ozawa Changchien as Hanzo, a Yakuza Inagawa-kai enforcer who rarely speaks and reveals late in the film that he is missing his leftmost two fingers, having performed yubitsume. "I guess he used to be a guy who can murder someone without a qualm," said Changchien of the character, "but by the time he arrives [on the alien planet], he'll no longer be that kind of person. Those things aren't explained in the script, but you'll get it when you see the movie." Changchien used his kendo training for a scene in which his character uses a katana in a duel against a Predator. Antal, a kendo fan, insisted that the sword fight look authentic.
- Mahershala Ali as Mombasa, a Revolutionary United Front death squad soldier from Sierra Leone.

The four Predators in the film are portrayed by Derek Mears, Carey Jones, and Brian Steele. The Predators are identified in the film's credits as the "Classic Predator", "Tracker Predator", "Falconer Predator", and "Berserker Predator". Mears plays the Classic Predator, designed to resemble the creature in the original film. Steele plays the Berserker and Falconer Predators, two of the larger Predators hunting the humans. The Berserker Predator is identified by alien mandible attached to its helmet and faces off against Royce in the film's climax, while the Falconer Predator controls a flying reconnaissance drone and is killed by Hanzo. Jones plays the Tracker Predator, identified by a pair of tusks attached to its helmet, which controls the quadrupedal hunting animals and is killed by Nikolai. Jones also doubled for Steele in some scenes as the Berserker and Falconer Predators.

== Production ==
=== Development ===
In 1994, Robert Rodriguez wrote an early script for a third Predator film for 20th Century Fox, while he was working on Desperado at the time. Rodriguez presented the script to the studio, but was denied when they realized that the budget would be too large. Fifteen years later, the studio decided to go with his script. Rodriguez stated:

It's the story from that script I had written way back then. They had hired me to write a Predator story while I was waiting to do Desperado back in 1995. It was crazy, this thing I came up with. So then fast-forward to now and, like, six months ago, they found the script and called me up. 'Hey, we want to redo this franchise and we found your old script. This is where we should have gone with the series! We want to move forward.' And that's what we're doing.

In 2009, Fox studio executive Alex Young called Rodriguez to consider using his treatment to revive the individual Predator franchise. Rodriguez would serve as producer, while Alex Litvak and Michael Finch would pen the script. The film was produced at Rodriguez's Troublemaker Studios as opposed to Fox so that Rodriguez had more creative control over the film. It was originally thought that Rodriguez would direct, but on July 1, 2009, Nimród Antal was officially signed on to direct.

Rodriguez and Antal originally said they wanted the film to be a sequel only to the original Predator as the film is trying to distance itself from Predator 2 and the first two Alien vs. Predator films.

=== Casting ===
At the 2009 San Diego Comic-Con Rodriguez stated that Predators would feature an ensemble cast, and that the most important element of the film would be "great characters so that the audience feels they're going on this journey with them". He also noted that the title had a double meaning, referring not only to the extraterrestrial hunters but also to the human characters, all of whom are dangerous killers. He and Antal wanted each of the characters to be well-developed enough to be able to stand alone. Rodriguez hoped to have Arnold Schwarzenegger play a cameo role as Dutch, his character from the original Predator film, but this ultimately did not happen.

=== Filming ===
The film was shot on a 53-day schedule. Exterior filming location was mostly set in Kolekole, Hawaii. Filming started on September 28, 2009. The film wrapped up its 22-day shoot on the Hawaii location on November 1, 2009. The film shot its interior set scenes at Robert Rodriguez's studio in Austin, Texas. Sixty percent of the film was shot in Texas in order to be eligible for a tax benefit. The film shot more exterior footage at Canyon Lake Gorge in Comal County and Hamilton Pool Preserve.

It was a blast. It was an amazing experience. We were in the tropical rainforests of Hawaii stomping through the mud and getting rained on all day and then we ended up finishing in Austin, Texas. I really think this movie is going to be good. They had cut together a trailer while we were still working and it looked amazing. It's a great cast and along with the action elements and the sci-fi elements, and with Robert Rodriguez being involved, I think it's going to push it to another level

— Actor Mahershala Ali, 411mania interview

=== Visual effects ===
Tom Woodruff Jr. and Alec Gillis, head of visual effects studio Amalgamated Dynamics (ADI), who also previously worked on 2004's Alien vs. Predator and 2007's Aliens vs. Predator: Requiem, did not return for the creature design of Predators, nor did Stan Winston Studios. Instead, KNB EFX's Howard Berger and Greg Nicotero took over building the creature suits and Weta Digital provided visual effects. Berger, who worked with Winston on the original Predator, stated that the studio is reprising the original Stan Winston design of the Predator in the film, saying "We wanted to have the Predator look as it did in the original film. We went back and looked at the original … everyone's going to be very happy that we've been very faithful to the Stan Winston designs." In addition to the original Predator designs, the film features many new creatures never before seen in a Predator film, such as a new breed of Predators that belong to a different tribe, alien creatures that have been domesticated by the Predators for use in hunting, and other alien creatures that have been brought to the planet by the Predators to be used as prey.

== Music ==
There had been speculation that original Predator composer and conductor Alan Silvestri would return to do the score, but on February 26, 2010, it was announced that John Debney, who worked with Rodriguez on such films as Spy Kids and Sin City, would compose the original score for the film.

Rodriguez shared his thoughts on how the score should play out, saying:

I think we're going to go for something that fits the tone of the movie really well. That original score went great with the movie, but the notes and the music do really evoke a quality—you know, when he (Debney) showed me his rough cut, or some scenes, every once in a while at the right moment I started hearing strings from the score—because we had a temp score, and it really works… So we'll probably incorporate some of that. At the right time, because you don't want to overuse it. But it's like the James Bond theme—you can't use it all of the time, but when you do, you can get the audience really, really pumped.

Debney recorded many custom sounds and instruments, including Tibetan long horns to create squeals and screams. He also manipulated metal scrapes and ethnic percussion to further highlight the advanced yet brutal and primitive quality of the Predators and their world. Debney also put up a sneak-peek of one of the Predators scoring sessions. La-La Land Records released the original score for the film on July 5, 2010. The song "Long Tall Sally" by Little Richard plays during the credits; it was also used in the original Predator film.

== Release ==
=== Theatrical ===
It was announced on March 3, 2010, that Rodriguez and Antal would reveal a first look at Predators at the SXSW Film Festival in Austin, Texas on March 12, at 10:15pm. Rodriguez expressed his excitement about the event, saying, "My director Nimród Antal and I are excited to bring this first look at Predators to Austin's SXSW Film Festival, an event that's become vital to the filmmaking scene. Austin is my home and I'm proud that Predators was conceived and filmed here."

=== Home media ===
Predators was released on Blu-ray and DVD formats on October 19, 2010. Both releases include commentary tracks by Robert Rodriguez and Nimród Antal, motion comics, and behind-the-scenes-features. The Blu-ray edition includes additional behind-the-scenes features as well as deleted and extended scenes.

== Reception ==
=== Box office ===
Released on July 9, 2010, in the United States, Predators opened with $10 million on Friday. The film finished third at the box office with $24.8 million during its first weekend, behind Despicable Me and The Twilight Saga: Eclipse. The film was released internationally on July 8, 2010, and had its biggest success in the markets of the UK and Ireland with $6.8 million and Japan with $6.3 million. The film has grossed $52 million in the United States and $75.2 million internationally, for a worldwide total of $127.2 million.

=== Critical response ===
On review aggregation website Rotten Tomatoes 65% of 205 critics gave the film a positive review, with an average rating of 5.8/10. The site's critical consensus reads: "After a string of subpar sequels, this bloody, action-packed reboot takes the Predator franchise back to its testosterone-fueled roots." On Metacritic the film has a weighted average score of 51 out of 100, based on 30 critics, indicating "mixed or average" reviews. Audiences polled by CinemaScore gave the film an average grade of C+ on an A+ to F scale.

A.O. Scott of The New York Times said, "Antal is a good enough action director that some of the combat is pretty exciting." Michael Phillips of the Chicago Tribune wrote, "When the story relocates to the Fishburne character's grimy, claustrophobic domicile, the movie turns static. The filmmakers may have been going for an Alien industrial-grunge vibe, but the tension just isn't sufficient."

The primary complaint leveled against the film is the failure, as film critic Roger Ebert of the Chicago Sun-Times described, of the cast to capture the "quiet suspense" of the original Predator film. Chris Nashawaty of Entertainment Weekly complained that the film's characters were more like "cardboard clichés lining up for the body count" than real action heroes.

== Sequel ==
Nimród Antal had talked about a direct sequel to Predators and said he would love to do one. Rodriguez has said that he has interest in a sequel because of the large number of potential ideas the Predator planet setting provides:

There are so many great ideas… Just following Laurence Fishburne's character (Noland) around in a prequel would be a great movie. Just the tales he tells in this movie alone, I want to see those experiences… That's why I wasn't precious even about the original script I had, because once you come up with the idea of a Predator Planet, that Predators use as their hunting grounds and humans are involved somehow, the story ideas that you can come up with are so numerous that you can come up with any approach. So we already have several ideas that we can go with for a sequel. They would all be good ideas but we would probably put them together to see which one rises to the top, if we made another one.

In 2010, Rodriguez confirmed that there would eventually be a Predators sequel:

"[The studio] said, 'Let's do some other ones. What other story ideas do you have?'" says the filmmaker. "Because it was like, let's test out the market with this one. They really wanted it to be pretty contained, pretty scaled-back. They didn't want to put too many of the ideas into it that we could save for a second one. So we could see what the appetite was, because the bigger movie would actually be what comes following that. That kind of sets up a new storyline, new location and world, and then you can really go crazy from there."

Adrien Brody also spoke about reprising his role in a possible sequel:

"I think a lot of that is determined by the success of the film. And I don't think that far ahead. The idea of reprising the role and going farther into that character is interesting to me… It would be exciting to watch a character progress or deteriorate. That's exciting for an actor. I thoroughly enjoyed playing Royce. Again, part of the attraction is I'm oddly drawn to material that affects me on an emotional level, and characters that are dealing with things that are challenging that I would question, that I'm not so familiar with. Royce has his emotional arc in this that most of the characters I've played don't come close to possessing. That's an interesting thing to cultivate."

In June 2014, Fox announced plans for a new film, with Shane Black co-writing and directing, Fred Dekker co-writing and John Davis producing (without the involvement of Rodriguez). At the time, Black said the film is a sequel, rather than a reboot, while Davis said the film would "reinvent the franchise". It was explained that since the plot takes place on Earth, the story will be more closely linked to the first two films; while the film acknowledges the events of Predator and Predator 2.

== Other media ==
=== Comic books ===
A four issue tie-in Predators comic book by Dark Horse Comics was released weekly from June 9 to June 30 to promote the release of the film. The comic series, consisting of two storylines titled "Welcome to the Jungle" and "A Predatory Life", serves as a prequel to the events depicted in the film. On July 14, a 72-page one-shot adaptation of the film was released, showing more back story of the characters Royce and Isabelle than is depicted in the film. On the same day a one-shot sequel comic titled "Preserve the Game" was also released, depicting the further adventures of Royce and Isabelle two months after the events of the film. A Marvel comic book titled Predator The Last Hunt released on February 21, 2024 and included elements from the film Predators such as the Predator Hell-Hounds.

=== Toys ===
In July 2010, NECA released the Classic Predator, Falconer Predator, and Berserker Predator action figures. NECA later released a second series of figures in December, consisting of a masked Classic Predator, an unmasked Berserker Predator, and the Tracker Predator. The Predator hound was released in March 2011. Hot Toys and Sideshow Collectibles have also created props, maquettes and figures for the film.

=== Video games ===
Downloadable games publisher Chillingo secured a licensing agreement with Fox Digital Entertainment to publish the official Predators video game for the iPhone, iPod Touch and iPad through Apple's App Store. The game was developed by independent game developer Angry Mob Games and was released on July 1, 2010, a week before the film's theatrical release. The game was later ported to Android and published by Fox Digital Entertainment in 2012.

Braga also reprises Isabelle in the 2020 Predator video game Predator: Hunting Grounds in paid downloadable content. Separate paid downloadable content for the same game features Arnold Schwarzenegger reprising Major Alan "Dutch" Schaefer from the original 1987 Predator.

== See also ==
- List of action films of the 2010s
