= Predator (film) =

1987 film by John McTiernan

- Theatrical release poster
- Directed by: John McTiernan
- Written by: Jim Thomas; John Thomas
- Produced by: Lawrence Gordon; Joel Silver; John Davis
- Starring: Arnold Schwarzenegger; Carl Weathers
- Cinematography: Donald McAlpine
- Edited by: John F. Link; Mark Helfrich
- Music by: Alan Silvestri
- Production companies: 20th Century Fox; Davis Entertainment; Silver Pictures; Gordon Company
- Distributed by: 20th Century Fox
- Release date: June 12, 1987
- Running time: 107 minutes
- Country: United States
- Language: English
- Budget: $15–18 million
- Box office: $98.3 million

Predator is a 1987 American science fiction horror film directed by John McTiernan and written by brothers Jim and John Thomas. Arnold Schwarzenegger stars as Dutch, the leader of a paramilitary rescue team on a mission to save hostages in a Central American rainforest, who encounters a deadly Predator (Kevin Peter Hall), a skilled and technologically advanced extraterrestrial that stalks and hunts down his team. The film also features Elpidia Carrillo, Carl Weathers, Richard Chaves, Sonny Landham, Bill Duke, Jesse Ventura and Shane Black.

Predator was written in 1984 with a working title of Hunter. Filming ran from March to June 1986 with creature effects devised by Stan Winston and a budget of around $15 million. 20th Century Fox released the film on June 12, 1987, in the United States of America, and it grossed $98 million worldwide. Initial reviews were mixed, but the film has since been considered a classic of action and science fiction genres and one of the best films of the 1980s, and was nominated for an Academy Award for Best Visual Effects.

The success of Predator inspired a media franchise of films, novels, comic books, video games, and toys. It spawned six additional films: Predator 2 (1990), Predators (2010), The Predator (2018), Prey (2022), Predator: Killer of Killers (2025) and Predator: Badlands (2025).

The Predator franchise had a crossover with the Alien franchise which produced the Alien vs. Predator film series: Alien vs. Predator (2004) and Aliens vs. Predator: Requiem (2007). The character Dutch made his return in the video games Alien vs. Predator (1994) and Predator: Hunting Grounds (2020), with Schwarzenegger reprising his role in the latter.

== Plot ==
An extraterrestrial spacecraft deploys a shuttle to Earth. Sometime later, Major Dutch and his paramilitary rescue team—mercenary Mac Eliot, explosives specialist Poncho Ramirez, heavy gunner Blain Cooper, expert tracker Billy Sole, and radio operator Rick Hawkins—are tasked with rescuing a local cabinet minister whose helicopter was shot down in a Central American jungle. Dutch's Vietnam War ally, Al Dillon, now a CIA agent, accompanies the team to oversee the mission.

The team finds the helicopter wreckage and traces of guerrilla soldiers, as well as three skinned corpses hung high in the trees nearby. Dutch identifies the corpses as Green Berets and becomes suspicious of Dillon's intentions after discovering that the helicopter was outfitted for surveillance. Dutch's team attacks the guerrilla camp, killing the soldiers and their Soviet military allies, and learning the hostages were CIA agents. Dillon admits the cabinet minister story was a lie to convince Dutch—who refuses to use his team for assassinations—to eliminate the camp and prevent a Soviet-sponsored invasion. Dillon also discloses that the original mission team disappeared and the Green Berets had been sent to find them. Dillon takes a surviving guerrilla, Anna, prisoner, and the team travels towards the extraction point.

Unbeknownst to the team, a technologically advanced, humanoid predator has stalked them since their arrival, remaining invisible with a cloaking device, and using thermal imaging vision to see their body heat. Billy senses the presence of something inhuman, but cannot confirm his suspicions. Anna flees when the team is distracted, and although Hawkins catches her, he is killed by the predator while Anna is spared. As the team searches for Hawkins' body, the predator kills Blain. Mac catches a glimpse of the predator's cloaked form and, enraged at Blain's death, provokes the team into blindly firing their weapons into the jungle, wounding the predator. The team sets up camp for the night, booby-trapping the perimeter. A wild boar triggers a trap, and the predator uses the ensuing confusion to steal Blain's corpse.

The following day, Dutch deduces that the creature is stalking them from the treetops. Dutch releases Anna, needing her to work with them to survive. She recounts local folktales of a monster that kills men and takes trophies from their corpses, typically when the weather is hot. The team booby-traps the treetops to force the predator into a net, but it escapes and Poncho is injured. Mac and Dillon, who both want to make amends to the team, pursue the predator, but are outmaneuvered and killed. The predator soon catches the survivors, killing Billy and Poncho. Realizing the predator only attacks those it considers a threat, Dutch warns Anna to relinquish her weapon and run to the extraction point. Dutch distracts the predator before falling from a cliff into a waterfall and washing up on a muddy shore. The predator pursues Dutch, but is seemingly unable to see him, and leaves to collect the skulls of the others as trophies. Dutch concludes that the mud masked his body heat, making him invisible to the predator.

Seeking to avenge his team, Dutch creates makeshift traps and weapons. As night falls, he covers himself in mud and lets out a war cry to lure the predator toward him. Dutch uses his invisibility to wound the predator and disable its cloaking device, but subsequently falls into a river which washes off his mud camouflage. Deeming Dutch a worthy opponent, the predator removes its weapons and mask—revealing a monstrous visage—to face him in hand-to-hand combat. Easily outmatched by the larger and stronger creature, Dutch attempts to goad it into a trapped tunnel, but the predator suspects his plan and circumvents it. Dutch triggers the trap himself, releasing its counterweight, which crushes the predator. Mortally wounded, the predator activates a wrist-mounted self-destruct device. Dutch flees, barely escaping the enormous resulting explosion that razes the area.

As dawn breaks, the extraction helicopter arrives with Anna to collect the exhausted and traumatized Dutch.

== Cast ==
The main cast of Predator. Left to right: Jesse Ventura, Shane Black, Arnold Schwarzenegger, Bill Duke, Carl Weathers, Sonny Landham, and Richard Chaves.

- Arnold Schwarzenegger as Alan "Dutch" Schaefer
- Carl Weathers as Al Dillon
- Elpidia Carrillo as Anna Gonsalves
- Bill Duke as Mac Eliot
- Jesse Ventura as Blain Cooper
- Sonny Landham as Billy Sole
- Richard Chaves as Jorge "Poncho" Ramirez
- R. G. Armstrong as General Homer Phillips (Note: The character is credited as General Phillips, but his name patch says "Philips".)
- Shane Black as Rick Hawkins
- Kevin Peter Hall as the Predator
  - Hall also portrays a helicopter pilot

An uncredited Peter Cullen provides the vocal effects for the Predator.

== Production ==
=== Development ===
Jim and John Thomas's script for Predator was initially titled Hunter. The original concept, centered on a plot of "what it is to be hunted", concerned a band of alien hunters of several species seeking various targets. That concept was eventually streamlined to one extraterrestrial hunting the most dangerous species, humans, and the "most dangerous man", a combat soldier. Additionally, the setting was chosen as Central America for having constant special forces operations during that time.

As the Thomas brothers were first-time screenwriters with little credibility in Hollywood, they struggled to attract attention for their proposed film and eventually resorted to slipping the script under the door of 20th Century Fox producer Michael Levy (who would go on to serve as executive producer on the film's sequel, Predator 2). Levy then brought the screenplay to producer Joel Silver who, based on his experience with Commando, decided to turn the science fiction pulp story line into a big-budget film. Silver enlisted his former boss Lawrence Gordon as co-producer and John McTiernan was hired as director for his first studio film. At one point, New Zealand director Geoff Murphy was also considered to direct.

=== Casting ===
Kevin Peter Hall as the Predator

Silver and Gordon first approached Arnold Schwarzenegger with the lead role. Schwarzenegger said:

The first thing I look for in a script is a good idea, a majority of scripts are rip-offs of other movies. People think they can become successful overnight. They sat down one weekend and wrote a script because they read that Stallone did that with Rocky. Predator was one of the scripts I read, and it bothered me in one way. It was just me and the alien. So we re-did the whole thing so that it was a team of commandos and then I liked the idea. I thought it would make a much more effective movie and be much more believable. I liked the idea of starting out with an action-adventure, but then coming in with some horror and science fiction.

He previously starred in Commando, on which Silver had served as the producer. To play the elite group of soldiers, both Silver and Gordon, with co-producer John Davis, searched for other larger-than-life men of action. Carl Weathers, who had been memorable as boxer Apollo Creed in the Rocky films, was their first choice to play Al Dillon while professional wrestler and former Navy SEAL Jesse Ventura was hired for his formidable physique as Blain Cooper, co-starring with Schwarzenegger the same year in The Running Man. Also among the cast were Sonny Landham, Richard Chaves and Bill Duke, who co-starred alongside Schwarzenegger in Commando.

Jean-Claude Van Damme was originally cast as the Predator with the intent that the physical action star would use his martial arts skills to make the Predator an agile, ninja-like hunter. However, when the 5'9" Van Damme was compared to Schwarzenegger, Weathers and Ventura—actors over 6 feet tall and known for their bodybuilding regimens—it became apparent a more physically imposing man was needed to make the creature appear threatening. Additionally, it was reported that Van Damme constantly complained about the monster suit being too hot and causing him to pass out. He allegedly had also repeatedly voiced reservations about only appearing on camera in the suit. Additionally, the original design for the Predator was felt to be too cumbersome and difficult to manage in the jungle and, even with a more imposing actor, did not provoke enough fear. Van Damme was removed from the film and replaced by the 7'2" Kevin Peter Hall, who had just finished work as the titular sasquatch in Harry and the Hendersons.

=== Filming ===
Commitments by Schwarzenegger delayed the start of filming by several months. The delay gave Silver enough time to secure a minor rewrite from screenwriter David Peoples. Principal photography eventually began in the jungles of Palenque, Chiapas, Mexico, during the last week of March 1986, but most of the movie was shot near Puerto Vallarta, Mexico. That same month, art director Augustin Ytuarte and location manager Federico Ysunza were among the passengers killed in the crash of Mexicana de Aviación Flight 940. A dedication to their memory was later included in the film's closing credits. Much of the material dealing with the unit's deployment in the jungle was completed in a few short weeks and both Silver and Gordon were pleased by the dailies provided by McTiernan. On Friday, April 25, production halted so that Schwarzenegger could get to his wedding on time, flying to Hyannis Port in a Learjet chartered by Silver. Schwarzenegger was married on April 26, 1986, to Maria Shriver, and honeymooned for only three days while the second unit completed additional filming. The production resumed filming on May 12 and ended in late June 1986.

Both McTiernan and Schwarzenegger lost 25 pounds during the film. Schwarzenegger's weight loss was a professional choice while McTiernan lost the weight because he avoided the food in Mexico due to health concerns. Unlike McTiernan, most of the cast and crew suffered from travelers' diarrhea since the Mexican hotel in which they were living had problems with its water purification. In an interview, Carl Weathers said the actors would secretly wake up as early as 3:00 a.m. to exercise before the day's shooting. Weathers also stated that he would act as if his physique was naturally given to him and would exercise only after the other actors were nowhere to be seen.

According to Schwarzenegger, filming was physically demanding. The actor—and former bodybuilder—shipped gym equipment to Mexico and trained intensively every day before shooting began, usually with his co-stars. Screenwriter Jim Thomas was impressed with the training regimen and said: "I think that phrase 'manly men' was coined [during the production of Predator]". Among other tasks, Schwarzenegger had to swim in very cold water and spent three weeks covered in mud for the climactic battle with the Predator. In addition, cast and crew endured freezing temperatures in the Mexican jungle that required heat lamps to be on all of the time. Cast and crew filmed on rough terrain that, according to the actor, was never flat, "always on a hill. We stood all day long on a hill, one leg down, one leg up. It was terrible." Schwarzenegger also faced the challenge of working with Kevin Peter Hall, who could not see in the Predator suit. The actor recalled that "when he's supposed to slap me around and stay far from my face, all of a sudden, whap! There is this hand with claws on it!" Hall stated in an interview that his experience with the film "wasn't a movie, it was a survival story for all of us." For example, in the scene where the Predator chases Dutch, the swamp water was foul, stagnant and full of leeches. Hall could not see out of the mask and had to rehearse his scenes with it off and memorize where everything was. The outfit was difficult to wear because it was heavy and affected his balance.

=== Visual effects ===
The original Predator creature was created by Richard Edlund of Boss Film Studios and was a disproportionate, ungainly creature with large yellow eyes and a dog-like head, and nowhere near as agile as necessary for what the filmmakers had intended. After a call was made to have a new alien creature costume, creature effects artist Rick Baker put in a bid, but ultimately McTiernan consulted Stan Winston. Winston had previously worked with Schwarzenegger as a visual effects artist on the 1984 film The Terminator. While on a plane ride to Fox studios alongside Aliens director James Cameron, Winston sketched monster ideas. Cameron suggested he had always wanted to see a creature with mandibles, which became part of the Predator's iconic look.

R/Greenberg Associates created the film's optical effects, including the alien's ability to become invisible, its thermal vision point of view, its glowing blood, and the electrical spark effects. The invisibility effect was achieved by having someone wearing a bright red suit (because it was the furthest opposite of the green of the jungle and the blue of the sky) the size of the Predator. The red was removed with chroma key techniques, leaving an empty area. The take was then repeated without the actors using a 30% wider lens on the camera. When the two takes were combined optically, the jungle from the second take filled in the empty area. Since the second take was filmed with a wider lens, a vague outline of the alien could be seen with the background scenery bending around its shape.

For thermal vision, infrared film could not be used because it did not register in the range of body temperature wavelengths. The filmmakers used an Inframetrics thermal video scanner because it gave good heat images of objects and people. The glowing blood was achieved by green liquid from glow sticks mixed with personal lubricant for texture. The electrical sparks were rotoscoped animation using white paper pins registered on portable light tables to black-and-white prints of the film frames. The drawings were composited by the optical crew for the finished effects. Additional visual effects, mainly for the opening title sequence of the Predator arriving on Earth, were supplied by Dream Quest Images (later Oscar-winners for their work on The Abyss and Total Recall). The film was nominated for an Academy Award for Best Visual Effects.

== Music ==
The score was composed and conducted by Alan Silvestri, who was coming off the huge success of Back to the Future in 1985, and performed by the Hollywood Studio Symphony. Joel Silver originally wanted Michael Kamen to do the music for this film after collaborating with him on Lethal Weapon (1987), but Kamen was unavailable due to him working on Adventures in Babysitting (1987). However, director John McTiernan recommended hiring Silvestri after hearing his work in Back to the Future. Predator was his first major action movie and the score is full of his familiar characteristics: heavy horn blasts, staccato string rhythms, and undulating timpani rolls that highlight the action and suspense. Little Richard's song "Long Tall Sally" is featured in the helicopter en route to the jungle. Mac also recites a few lines from the song as he is chasing the Predator after it escapes from their booby trap. Silvestri returned for the sequel, making him the only composer to have scored more than one film in either the Alien or Predator series.

In 2003, Varèse Sarabande and Fox Music released the soundtrack album as part of its limited release CD Club collection; the album also includes Elliot Goldenthal's arrangement of Alfred Newman's 20th Century Fox fanfare, which was used on Alien 3. In 2007, Brian Tyler adapted and composed some of Silvestri's themes used in the score of the film Aliens vs. Predator: Requiem.

In 2010, the same year Predators featured an adaptation of Silvestri's score by John Debney, Intrada Records and Fox Music released the album in a 3000-copy limited edition with remastered sound, many cues combined and renamed, and most notably (as with Intrada's release of Basil Poledouris's score for RoboCop) presenting the original end credits music as recorded (the film versions are mixed differently). This release is notable for having sold out within a day. In 2018, Henry Jackman adapted and composed Silvestri's themes in the score of the film, The Predator.

== Release ==
=== Home media ===
Predator was first released on VHS on January 21, 1988. It was later released on DVD on December 26, 2000. It was also released on Blu-ray on April 15, 2008. An "Ultimate Hunter Edition" Blu-ray was released in 2010, which featured a new transfer of the film that High Def Digest called a "disaster" for its excessive noise reduction. It was released on Blu-ray 3D on December 17, 2013, and on Ultra HD Blu-ray on August 7, 2018.

=== SVOD viewership ===
According to the streaming aggregator JustWatch, Predator was the 9th most streamed film across all platforms in the United States, during the week ending August 1, 2022, and the 10th during the week ending August 14, 2022.

== Reception ==
=== Box office ===
Released on June 12, 1987, Predator was No. 1 at the US box office in its opening weekend with a gross of $12 million. The film ranked 12th place in the domestic market for the calendar year 1987. The film grossed $98,267,558, of which $59,735,548 was from the US & Canadian box office. $38,532,010 was made in other countries.

=== Critical response ===
From contemporary reviews, Janet Maslin of The New York Times described the film as "grisly and dull, with few surprises". Dean Lamanna wrote in Cinefantastique that "the militarized monster movie tires under its own derivative weight". Michael Wilmington of the Los Angeles Times proclaimed it "arguably one of the emptiest, feeblest, most derivative scripts ever made as a major studio movie". Variety declared the film was a "slightly above-average actioner that tries to compensate for tissue-thin-plot with ever-more-grisly death sequences and impressive special effects". Adam Barker of The Monthly Film Bulletin found that "unfortunately, special effects have also been substituted for suspense" and "the early appearance of the Predator makes the final gladiatorial conflict predictable, and the monster's multiple transformations also exhaust interest in its final appearance". The Hollywood Reporter's Duane Byrge felt that the Predator's weaponized attacks relied too heavily on special effects, but found the film to be a "well-made, old-style assault movie" and a "full-assault" visual experience.

Though finding the creature's motivations poorly explained, critic Roger Ebert was more complimentary of the film. He wrote: "Predator moves at a breakneck pace, it has strong and simple characterizations, it has good location photography and terrific special effects, and it supplies what it claims to supply: an effective action movie." On their TV show At the Movies, Ebert's colleague Gene Siskel said the film was a stale mix of Rambo and Alien, commenting, "I'm personally tired of seeing a commando armed to the teeth battling a slimy extraterrestrial creature with a horrendous overbite." Siskel did praise Schwarzenegger's humor and the Predator's air of mystery before its reveal, but ultimately gave the film a thumbs down.

Chris Hewitt of Empire wrote: "Predator has gradually become a sci-fi and action classic. It's not difficult to see why. John McTiernan's direction is claustrophobic, fluid and assured, staging the action with aplomb but concentrating just as much on tension and atmosphere... A thumping piece of powerhouse cinema." Peter Suderman of Reason magazine noted that "over the last 30-odd years, it has come to be regarded a classic of '80s action cinema".

On review aggregation website Rotten Tomatoes, the film received an approval rating of 65% based on 119 reviews. The site's critical consensus reads: "Predator: Part sci-fi, part horror, part action – all muscle." Metacritic assigned the film a weighted average score of 47 out of 100 based on 17 critics, indicating "mixed or average reviews". Audiences polled by CinemaScore gave the film an average grade of "B+" on an A+ to F scale.

=== Cinematic analysis ===
Scholars have interpreted Predator (1987) as a key text of 1980s action cinema, focusing on masculinity, mythology, ideology, and the monstrous. Susan Jeffords and Yvonne Tasker frame the film’s hard-bodied soldiers, led by Dutch (Arnold Schwarzenegger), within Reagan-era cultural politics. Jeffords links such muscular physiques and martial competence to a post-Vietnam restoration of national and masculine strength. Tasker examines how the film constructs hyper-masculine identities through camaraderie, physical spectacle, and a mythic contest with an extraterrestrial Other that elevates the struggle beyond specific Cold War politics. Douglas Kellner situates the film in 1980s media culture, marked by Cold War interventionism and residual distrust of government after Vietnam. The Central American jungle setting serves as a proxy for contemporary conflicts, while Dillon’s (Carl Weathers) CIA role and withheld knowledge highlight moral duplicity in covert operations, resonating with public skepticism during the Iran-Contra conflict. David Frauenfelder’s account of popular culture and classical mythology illuminates the narrative’s structure. The hero’s progressive isolation, ritualized combat, trophy-taking, and confrontation with an extraordinary opponent parallel classical monster-slaying stories, particularly those of Heracles as an “uncivilized civilizer.” The Predator’s rigid honor code stabilizes a fixed moral order amid human uncertainty and duplicity. Michael Eden uses the Predator as an example of a “monster of fixity” drawing on the notion of the pharmakon. Unlike liminal monsters, such figures embody rigid ethical codes and hierarchical order. The Predator exposes weaknesses in the human chain of command; Dutch then restores order by reverting to primal tactics. Eden links this explicitly to Tasker’s gender analysis, Frauenfelder’s mythic parallels, and the Reagan-era frameworks of Jeffords and Kellner.

=== Accolades ===
When considering Predator for an Academy Award nomination, the Academy of Motion Picture Arts and Sciences struggled to categorize the film due to its unconventional blend of visual and special effects techniques. The mechanical features of the character's head suggested the makeup effects category. However, because of the camouflage effect, there was also a visual effects aspect to the character. Ultimately, Stan Winston was nominated for an Oscar for Predator in the Best Visual Effects category—just as he had been for Aliens—but he and his co-nominees lost to the effects team from Innerspace at the 60th Academy Awards. Though in the same year the Academy had categorized the Predator creature as a visual effect, it honored Rick Baker with an Oscar in the Best Makeup category for his work on Harry and the Hendersons. This was despite the fact that Harry had been achieved in exactly the same way the Predator had, with a performer wearing a suit and a mechanical head. In fact, the same actor, Kevin Peter Hall, had performed in both suits.

=== Legacy ===
Predator has appeared on a number of "best of" lists. In 2007, C. Robert Cargill of RealNetworks resource Film.com (now merged into MTV Movies) ranked Predator as the seventh best film of 1987, calling it "one of the great science fiction horror films, often imitated, but never properly duplicated, not even by its own sequel". Entertainment Weekly named it the 22nd greatest action movie of all time in 2007 and the 14th among "The Best Rock-'em, Sock-'em Movies of the Past 25 Years" in 2009, saying: "Arnold Schwarzenegger has never been as manly as he was in this alien-hunting testosterone-fest." In 2012, IGN proclaimed it the 13th greatest action movie of all time. In 2008, Empire magazine ranked it 366th on their list of "The 500 Greatest Movies of All Time". Predator was ranked 4th in a 2015 Rolling Stone reader poll of the all-time best action films; it was described by reporter Andy Greene as "freakin' awesome". In a 2018 review for IGN, William Bibbiani called Predator "the most subversive action movie of the 1980s" and cites examples from the film of satire of the action film genre as a whole. In his review, he writes: "Predator may be a big, macho action movie, but it's also highly critical of the kinds of characters you'd normally find in big, macho action movies, and the superficial, unquestioningly heroic stories they appear in."

The line "Get to the chopper” was subsequently associated with Arnold Schwarzenegger, especially when he said the line again in some of his later appearances, including The New Celebrity Apprentice and advertisements for the mobile game Mobile Strike. Lieutenant Andrew Pierce, Christian Boeving's leading hero from the 2003 action film When Eagles Strike, was based on Schwarzenegger's image in the film. In 2013, NECA released action figure collectables of Major Dutch and the Predator. That same year, Predator was converted into 3D for a Blu-ray release.

Improbably, two of the actors from the movie went on to become state governors and a third ran for governor. Jessie Ventura served as governor of Minnesota from 1999 to 2003, Arnold Schwarzenegger as governor of California from 2003 to 2011 and Sonny Landham ran unsuccessfully for governor of Kentucky in 2003.

The Predator makes an appearance in Tom Clancy's Ghost Recon Wildlands, in a bonus mission called "The Hunt". In 2021, the Predator was featured in the video game Fortnite as a cosmetic outfit for the character and a hidden enemy, the first of which gave players the associated abilities such as invisibility and the shoulder cannon.

The film inspired Ander Monson's 2022 book Predator: A Memoir, a Movie, an Obsession.

A clip of the film was featured during a scene from the 2026 film Forgotten Island.

== Other media ==
=== Video games ===
In 1987, Activision released a side-scrolling video game based on the movie and also entitled Predator.

Dutch Schaefer returned as a playable character in the 1994 beat 'em up video game Alien vs. Predator and the 2020 multiplayer video game Predator: Hunting Grounds. Arnold Schwarzenegger reprised his role in the latter game in paid downloadable content (DLC).

=== Dutch-Dillon handshake ===
The film includes a handshake between Dutch (Schwarzenegger) and Dillon (Weathers) that became a viral meme. The handshake, known as the "Epic Handshake", also called "Predator Handshake" or "arm-wrestle handshake", is performed by two individuals slapping opposite hands palm-to-palm, similar to arm wrestling positioning. Described as manly and "testosterone-filled", it can be a display of physical dominance, and a way to boast toughness. It is sometimes performed after competitions, for instance during professional wrestling or tennis. First becoming a meme when people began creating their own versions, it later returned as an object-labeling meme with a painting of the scene showing the two arms either agreeing or fighting over something.

== Franchise ==
=== Sequels ===
The success of Predator resulted in a sequel, Predator 2, that was released in 1990. This was followed by further entries Predators and The Predator. The latest entry, Predator: Badlands, was released in 2025.

=== Prequel ===
A prequel film set in 1719 titled Prey was released in 2022.

=== Animated film ===
A further film, Predator: Killer of Killers, was released in 2025, which marks the return of Dutch and Mike Harrigan (Danny Glover) from Predator 2.

=== Crossover series ===
The Predator creatures crossed over with the Xenomorphs of the Alien franchise in the films Alien vs. Predator and Aliens vs. Predator: Requiem.
