= Aliens vs. Predator: Requiem =

2007 film by the Brothers Strause

- Theatrical release poster
- Directed by: The Brothers Strause
- Written by: Shane Salerno
- Based on: Alien characters by; Dan O'Bannon; Ronald Shusett; Predator characters by; Jim Thomas; John Thomas
- Produced by: John Davis; David Giler; Walter Hill
- Starring: Steven Pasquale; Reiko Aylesworth; John Ortiz; Johnny Lewis; Ariel Gade
- Cinematography: Daniel C. Pearl
- Edited by: Dan Zimmerman
- Music by: Brian Tyler
- Production companies: 20th Century Fox; Davis Entertainment; Brandywine Productions; Dune Entertainment
- Distributed by: 20th Century Fox
- Release dates: November 4, 2007 (Los Angeles); December 25, 2007 (United States)
- Running time: 94 minutes
- Country: United States
- Language: English
- Budget: $40 million
- Box office: $130.3 million

Aliens vs. Predator: Requiem (stylized on-screen as AVPR: Aliens vs Predator - Requiem) is a 2007 American science fiction horror film directed by the Brothers Strause from a screenplay by Shane Salerno. It is the second installment in the Alien vs. Predator franchise, and the sequel to Alien vs. Predator (2004).

Set immediately after the events of the previous film, the film begins with a Predator ship crashing into a forest outside of Gunnison, Colorado, where an Alien-Predator hybrid known as the Predalien escapes and makes its way to the nearby small town. Wolf, a skilled veteran "cleaner", is dispatched to kill the Predalien, and the townspeople try to escape the ensuing carnage. The film stars Steven Pasquale, Reiko Aylesworth, John Ortiz, Johnny Lewis and Ariel Gade.

Aliens vs. Predator: Requiem premiered on November 4, 2007, in Los Angeles. It was released theatrically by 20th Century Fox on December 25 in the United States. The film received generally negative reviews from critics for its poor lighting, editing, and lack of originality. It grossed $130.2 million worldwide against a production budget of $40 million. Plans for another sequel were abandoned, with further independent entries in both franchises released in 2010 and 2012 respectively.

== Plot ==
A Yautja ship leaves Earth carrying captured Xenomorph facehuggers and Scar's body before a chestburster emerges, with characteristic traits of both species. (Note: As depicted in Alien vs. Predator (film)) The chestburster quickly matures into an adult Predalien, and starts slaughtering the Yautja aboard a scout ship. One Yautja accidentally blows a hole in the ship's hull with its Plasmacaster, causing it to crash in a forest outside Gunnison, Colorado. The last surviving Yautja onboard sends a distress signal before being killed by the Predalien. The Predalien and several facehuggers escape, implanting embryos into several humans, including a hunter and his son, Buddy, and Sam, and several vagrants in the sewers.

On Yautja Prime, the Yautja home planet, Wolf, a highly skilled veteran Yautja, receives the distress signal and departs for Earth, intending solely to exterminate the Predalien and the Xenomorphs. He arrives at the site where the ship crashed, using a Yautja's mask to watch a recording of the ship attack and a syringe to detect traces of the facehuggers. He also triggers a bomb that destroys the entire ship.

Later, Wolf encounters the corpses of Buddy and Sam, as well as the facehuggers that killed them, using an acid-like liquid to dispose of their bodies and killing a police officer who spotted him, with the town having launched a manhunt to investigate their disappearances. Meanwhile, ex-convict Dallas Howard returns to Gunnison after serving time in prison. He reunites with his younger brother Ricky, who is in love with his classmate Jesse Salinger but is constantly harassed by her boyfriend, Dale Collins, and his two friends, Nick and Mark. Kelly O'Brien also returns to Gunnison after serving in the army reserves and reunites with her husband, Tim, and daughter, Molly.

After disposing of the remains of the homeless people killed by the facehuggers and Predalien, Wolf starts killing Xenomorphs in the sewer, but they manage to escape when the Predalien intervenes. Wolf pursues the Xenomorphs to the power plant, where collateral damage from his Plasmacaster causes a citywide power outage. Ricky and Jesse meet at the high school swimming pool, but Dale and his friends interrupt them just as the power goes out. A Xenomorph then appears and kills Dale's friends, but Dale, Jesse, and Ricky escape; Another Xenomorph invades the O'Briens' home, killing Tim while Kelly escapes with Molly.

Ricky, Jesse, Dale, Dallas, and Sheriff Eddie Morales gather at a sporting goods store to collect weapons, where Kelly and Molly meet them. Reinforcements from the Colorado Army National Guard arrive but are quickly ambushed and slaughtered by the Xenomorphs. Wolf captures Dallas inside the store to use as bait to lure the Xenomorphs. Several Xenomorphs arrive; Dale is killed when a Xenomorph's blood spills onto him, and one of Wolf's Plasmacasters is damaged, but Wolf reconfigures the other into a Plasma Pistol.

As survivors flee Gunnison, Colonel Stevens notifies any survivors that the military is organizing an air evacuation at the town center. Skeptical that they can reach it without encountering Xenomorphs, Dallas and Kelly head to the hospital helicopter, while Eddie and the others go to the evacuation zone. The hospital is overrun, and the Predalien is building a hive. Wolf arrives, fights the Xenomorphs, wounds the Predalien, and loses his Plasmacaster. When Jesse panics, he accidentally kills her with a shuriken. Distraught, Ricky shoots at Wolf but is injured by the Predalien. A Xenomorph attacks Wolf, and they fall down an elevator shaft. Dallas takes Wolf's Plasma Pistol.

Dallas, Ricky, Kelly, and Molly reach the roof and fight off several Xenomorphs before escaping in the helicopter. Having survived the fall, Wolf engages the Predalien in single combat. The two mortally wound each other just as an F-22 Raptor arrives and drops a tactical nuclear weapon, which annihilates the town along with the remaining townspeople, including the Xenomorphs, the Predalien, and Wolf. The shockwave causes the fleeing helicopter to crash in a forest clearing, where the military rescues the survivors. Dallas relinquishes Wolf's Plasma Pistol, and his brother receives medical attention. Shortly thereafter, Colonel Stevens presents the plasma pistol to Ms. Yutani.

== Cast ==
- Steven Pasquale as Dallas Howard, a recently released convict, Ricky's brother.
- Reiko Aylesworth as Kelly O'Brien, a soldier returning to her family.
- John Ortiz as Eddie Morales, the sheriff of Gunnison.
- Johnny Lewis as Ricky Howard, a student and younger brother of Dallas.
- Sam Trammell as Tim O'Brien, the husband to Kelly and father of Molly.
- Ariel Gade as Molly O'Brien, the daughter of Kelly and Tim O'Brien.
- Robert Joy as Colonel Stevens, the commander of the military forces.
- Kristen Hager as Jesse Salinger, the love interest of Ricky and Dale's girlfriend.
- David Paetkau as Dale Collins, Jesse's boyfriend who bullies Ricky.
- Gina Holden as Carrie Adams, a pregnant waitress; Deputy Ray Adams' wife.
- Matt Ward as Mark, one of Dale's friends.
- Michal Suchánek as Nick, one of Dale's friends.
- David Hornsby as Drew Roberts, a pizza parlor supervisor and Ricky's boss.
- Chris William Martin as Deputy Ray Adams, Carrie's husband.
- Chelah Horsdal as Darcy Benson, a mother searching for her son and husband.
- Liam James as Sam Benson, Darcy and Buddy's son.
- Kurt Max Runte as Buddy Benson, Darcy's husband and Sam's father.
- James Chutter as Deputy Joe
- Tim Henry as Dr. Lennon
- Tom McBeath as Karl
- Ty Olsson as Nathan
- Rainbow Sun Francks as Earl
- Juan Riedinger as Scotty
- Dalias Blake as Lieutenant Peter Wood
- Curtis Caravaggio as Special Forces Commander
- Françoise Yip as Ms. Yutani, the CEO of the Yutani Corporation.
- Tom Woodruff Jr. as the Aliens and the Predalien. Having previously portrayed the Aliens in Alien 3, Alien Resurrection, and Alien vs. Predator. Woodruff reprised the role for the film.
- Ian Whyte as The Predator / "Wolf", the main Yautja who arrives on Earth to eliminate the Aliens and all traces of their presence. The production team nicknamed the character "Wolf" after Harvey Keitel's character in Pulp Fiction, whose role is also that of a "cleaner." Matthew Charles Santoro provided the voice of Wolf. Whyte portrayed the four Yautja in the previous film.
- Bobby "Slim" Jones ("Bull") and Ian Feuer ("Bone Grill") as the additional Yautja.

== Production ==
Inspired by Terminator 2: Judgment Day, brothers Colin and Greg Strause moved to Los Angeles to break into the film business. After an unsuccessful attempt to find employment at Industrial Light & Magic, the brothers worked on The X-Files film and founded their own special effects company, Hydraulx. The company produced special effects for films such as Volcano, The Day After Tomorrow, Poseidon and 300 and the brothers began a career directing commercials and music videos. Colin believes Hydraulx secured a strong relationship with 20th Century Fox, which owns the Alien and Predator franchises.

The brothers unsuccessfully pitched an idea for the first Alien vs. Predator film and Fox almost bought a film titled Wolfenstein suggested by the brothers. Said Colin, "When the script came up for this movie, they thought we'd be perfect for it because it's an ambitious movie for the budget that they had and they knew that having our visual effects background was going to be a huge thing." The brothers were hired to direct the sequel to Alien vs. Predator in late spring 2006 and had limited time to start filming in the fall. The film's original title was Alien vs. Predator: Survival of the Fittest, but was later dropped.

Filming on Aliens vs. Predator: Requiem begun on September 23, 2006, in Vancouver, British Columbia for a 52-day schedule. During filming breaks, the brothers supervised visual effects work on 300, Shooter and Fantastic Four: Rise of the Silver Surfer by using in-house supervisors and a system called Mavis and Lucy, which let the brothers track, view and approve dailies. Colin estimates Hydraulx produced 460 of the 500 visual effects shots including the nuclear explosion which was created using Maya fluids and BA Volume Shader. The interior of the Predator ship was created using computer-generated imagery (CGI), as the brothers felt it would be more cost effective than building a set. The visual effects team peaked at 110 people for several months and averaged 70, almost all of the entire Hydraulx staff.

Using their knowledge in visual effects and making use of principal photography, the brothers tried to film as much as they could in camera without resorting to CGI. Colin said, "other than the exterior spaceship shots, there are no pure CG shots." CGI was used for the Alien tails and inner jaws, whereas they required puppeteers and wire removal on previous films. The main visual effects of the film included set design, a nuclear explosion, the Predator's ship crashing and the Predator cloak, about which Colin stated: "We wanted to make sure it didn't look too digital."

The brothers wanted actor Adam Baldwin to reprise his role as Agent Garber from Predator 2, but were unable to do so, instead using Robert Joy as a new character.

== Music ==
Composer Brian Tyler was hired to write the score for the film. The soundtrack album was released on December 11, 2007, by Varèse Sarabande and Fox Music. Despite not appearing in the CD soundtrack, the song "Wach auf!" ("Wake Up") by German band Oomph! was released as a promo in January 2008, with the music video using clips from the film. The song appeared on the band's album Monster.

== Release ==
=== Theatrical ===
Aliens vs. Predator: Requiem had its premiere at the Los Angeles Comic Book and Sci Fi Convention in Los Angeles on November 4, 2007. The Brothers Strause attended the event, presenting the film to an audience for the first time. The film was later released in the United States and in other territories on December 25, 2007.

=== Home media ===
Aliens vs. Predator: Requiem was released on DVD, Blu-ray and PSP UMD Disc on April 15, 2008, in North America and May 12, 2008, in the United Kingdom by Fox Home Entertainment. It was released in three versions: a single-disc, R-rated version of the 94-minute theatrical presentation, a single-disc unrated version extended to 101 minutes and a two-disc unrated version with the 101-minute film and a second disc of special features. Extra features on the single-disc editions include two audio commentary tracks: one by the directors and producer John Davis and a second by creature effects designers and creators Tom Woodruff Jr. and Alec Gillis.

Disc one of the two-disc unrated edition includes both commentary tracks as well as both cuts of the film seamlessly branched and an exclusive "Weyland-Yutani archives" picture-in-picture reference guide to the warring extraterrestrial races; five behind-the-scenes featurettes: Prepare for War: Development & Production, Fight to the Finish, The Nightmare Returns: Creating the Aliens, Crossbreed: The Predalien and Building the Predator Homeworld; multiple galleries of still photos showing the creature designs and sets; and the film's theatrical trailer. The second disc includes a "digital copy" download feature.

In its first week of release, the film debuted at number two on the DVD charts, earning $7.7 million and number one on the Blu-ray charts. The film has made $27,403,705 in DVD sales in the United States.

== Reception ==
=== Box office ===
Aliens vs. Predator: Requiem opened in North America in 2,563 theaters along with The Bucket List and The Water Horse: Legend of the Deep. It was rated R for violence, gore and language, unlike its predecessor, which was given a PG-13 rating. In the UK and Australia, the BBFC's classification decision for the film is the same as the original (Rated 15), whilst the Australian ACB rated the film MA15+, up from the original's M rating.

The film grossed $9,515,615 on its opening day for an average of $3,707 per theater and was number six at the box office. It grossed $5 million in Australia, $9 million in Japan and the United Kingdom and $7 million in Russia, and had an international total of $86,288,761. The film had a domestic gross of $41,797,066 and an international gross of $88,493,819, bringing it to a total of $130,290,885.

=== Critical response ===
On Rotten Tomatoes, the film has a rating of 12% based on 78 reviews with an average rating of 3.3/10. The website's consensus reads: "The increased gore and violence over the first Alien vs. Predator can't excuse Requiem's disorientating editing, excessively murky lighting, and lack of new ideas." As of 2026, it is the lowest-rated Alien vs. Predator film on the website. On Metacritic, the film has a weighted average score of 29 out of 100, based on 14 critics, indicating "generally unfavorable" reviews.

Chris Hewitt of Empire called it an "early but strong contender for worst movie of 2008". Stina Chyn of Film Threat felt the camerawork "is a smidge too shaky and the lighting/color design too dark for me to relish the Predator-on-Alien butt-kicking". Josh Rosenblatt of The Austin Chronicle dismissed the film stating it was "An orgy of mindless violence, a random collection of bloody bodies, alien misanthropy and slobbering carnage designed to bore straight into the pleasure centers of 13-year-old boys and leave the rest of us wondering when the movies got so damn loud." Kirk Honeycutt of The Hollywood Reporter contributor called it a "dull actioner that looks like a bad video game".

Chris Nashawaty of Entertainment Weekly felt it was a "B movie that truly earns its B," and gave it a grading of "B" on an A to F scale. Variety contributor Joe Leydon said it "Provides enough cheap thrills and modest suspense to shake a few shekels from genre fans before really blasting off as homevid product". Ryan Stewart of Cinematical said he "can't recommend it as a good movie on its own merits, stocked as it is with cardboard cutout characters and a barely coherent plot, but it's miles more interesting than the last Alien vs. Predator film."

Conversely, Neil Genzlinger of The New York Times stated: "It may not be classic sci-fi like the original Alien, which it has in its DNA, but it's a perfectly respectable next step in the series."

=== Audience reception ===
Audiences polled by CinemaScore gave the film an average grade of "C" on an A+ to F scale, thus making Requiem the lowest-rated Alien vs. Predator film on the website.

=== Accolades ===
Year	Ceremony	Category	Result	Recipient(s)	Ref.
2007	Golden Schmoes Awards	Biggest Disappointment of the Year	Nominated	Aliens vs. Predator: Requiem	
2008	Golden Raspberry Awards	Worst Prequel or Sequel	Nominated	Aliens vs. Predator: Requiem	
2008	Golden Raspberry Awards	Worst Excuse for a Horror Movie	Nominated	Aliens vs. Predator: Requiem	
2008	MTV Movie Awards	Best Fight Sequence	Nominated	Alien vs. Predator	

== Future ==
During the production of Aliens vs. Predator: Requiem, the Brothers Strause expressed plans for a third Alien vs. Predator installment. However, the planned sequel was put on hold indefinitely.

The Predator franchise continued with Nimród Antal's Predators, Shane Black's The Predator (the latter of which featured references to AVP such as shurikens and Lex's spear which Scar made out of an Alien tail), and Dan Trachtenberg's Prey, Predator: Killer of Killers and Predator: Badlands, while the Alien franchise proceeded with Ridley Scott's Prometheus and Alien: Covenant, Fede Álvarez's Alien: Romulus and Noah Hawley's Alien: Earth. The only direct follow up any of these films have had to Requiem was Françoise Yip reprising her role as Mrs. Yutani in The Predator though much of her role was cut from the final film beyond silent background work.

== Video game ==
A tie-in video game for the film was released on November 13, 2007, in North America, November 30 in Europe and December 6 in Australia. The game, developed by Rebellion Developments and published by Sierra Entertainment, was a third-person action-adventure game, allowing players to take the role of the Wolf Predator from the film. Much like the movie, the game received generally negative reviews from the press.

== See also ==
- Alien franchise
- Predator franchise
- List of action films of the 2000s
- List of horror films of 2007
- List of science-fiction films of the 2000s
