= Predator (fictional species) =

Predator franchise fictional extraterrestrial species

- Predator and Alien vs. Predator race
- Kevin Peter Hall as the Predator as seen in Predator (1987)
- First appearance: Predator (1987)
- Created by: Jim Thomas; John Thomas; John McTiernan; Stan Winston

In-universe information
- Other names: Yautja; Hish-Qu-Ten; Skin Thieves
- Home world: Yautja Prime
- Type: Tribal lifeform
- Language: Yautja
- Notable members: Wolf; Scarface; Dek

The Predators are a fictional extraterrestrial species from the Predator franchise characterized by their ritualistic trophy hunting of other lifeforms. Initially conceived by screenwriters Jim and John Thomas and designed by special effects artist Stan Winston, the species made its first appearance as the titular villain in the 1987 science fiction action film Predator, directed by John McTiernan. Depicted as large, sapient and sentient humanoid beings equipped with advanced technologies such as active camouflage, directed-energy weapons, and interstellar spacecraft, they became emblematic horror monsters of the late 20th century, blending the tropes of slasher villains with elements of alien invasion and militaristic survival narratives.

The success of Predator led to the establishment of the broader Predator franchise. This includes several direct sequels and prequels—‌Predator 2 (1990), Predators (2010), The Predator (2018), Prey (2022), Predator: Killer of Killers (2025), and Predator: Badlands (2025)—‌as well as a range of expanded universe media, including comic books, novels, and video games. These works further developed the species' fictional mythology, assigning the creatures names such as Yautja, Hish-Qu-Ten, and Skin Thieves, and exploring aspects of their language, social hierarchy, and cultural practices.

Beginning with crossover comic books published in the 1990s under the Alien vs. Predator imprint, the Predators later intersected with the Alien film series, pitting the Predators against the titular alien character. This narrative convergence led to two theatrical crossover films—‌Alien vs. Predator (2004) and Aliens vs. Predator: Requiem (2007)—‌which further integrated the two fictional universes and expanded the lore of both characters.

== Concept and creation ==
=== Original conception ===
The Predator was initially developed by screenwriters Jim and John Thomas, who conceived of an alien big-game hunter, and determined that the most dangerous prey for it to hunt would be trained human soldiers. Their original concept evolved into a deadly extraterrestrial hunter stalking soldiers in the jungle, inspired in part by the brothers’ knowledge of military operations in Central America.

Originally, 20th Century Fox had contracted the makeup effects for the creature from Richard Edlund's Boss Film Creature Shop. According to former Boss Films make-up supervisor Steve Johnson, the initial design—‌endorsed by director John McTiernan—‌included 12-inch (300 mm) leg extensions that gave the Predator backward bent satyr-like legs and extended arms, along with a long neck, a dog-like head, and a single eye. Jean-Claude Van Damme was cast with the idea that his martial arts skills would lend the creature an agile, ninja-like quality. However, the suit's mantis-like proportions required him to walk on stilts, a task made nearly impossible by the muddy terrain of the Mexican jungle. After six weeks of shooting in Palenque, Mexico, the production shut down to redesign the creature.

=== Redesign ===
Early Predator design concepts by Stan Winston

The Predator design is credited to special effects artist Stan Winston, whom Arnold Schwarzenegger recommended to the production after his experience working with the makeup artist on The Terminator. While flying to Japan with Aliens director James Cameron to promote that film, Winston was doing concept art for the Predator on the flight. Cameron saw what he was drawing and said, "I always wanted to see something with mandibles." Winston then included them in his designs. Winston also drew influence from a painting of a rastafarian warrior that was in producer Joel Silver’s office, adding dreadlocks to the design. When compared to actors like Arnold Schwarzenegger, Carl Weathers, and Jesse Ventura, who were known for their bodybuilding physiques, it became clear that a more physically imposing actor was required to replace Van Damme. Kevin Peter Hall, standing at 7 ft 2 in (2.18 m), who had recently portrayed sasquatch in Harry and the Hendersons, was cast to play the Predator. Trained in mime, Hall incorporated tribal dance movements into his performance, notably during the final fight in the first film. Stan Winston's studio created all of the physical effects for Predator and Predator 2, creating the body suit for Hall and the mechanical facial effects.

=== Film portrayals ===
The Predator’s voice was provided by Peter Cullen, who used a clicking growl to prevent vocal strain, as he had done for the uncredited vocal effects of King Kong (1976). In Predator 2, Danny Glover suggested using members of the Los Angeles Lakers as background Predators due to his fan status, and Hall persuaded some of them to appear on short notice. Hall died shortly after the release of Predator 2. The voices of the Predators in the film were provided by Hal Rayle. In Alien vs. Predator (2004), Welsh actor Ian Whyte, standing at 7 ft 1 in (2.16 m), took over the Predator suit, portraying the "Scar" Predator. Whyte returned to play the "Wolf" Predator in Aliens vs. Predator: Requiem (2007). In Predators (2010), Brian Steele and Carey Jones portrayed the "Black Super Predators," a new breed who had been dropping humans on their planet for years to play a survival game against them. In a nod to the original film, Derek Mears played the "Classic Predator," resembling the original creature from Predator. In The Predator (2018), stuntman Brian A. Prince, standing 6 ft 10 in (2.08 m), portrayed the "standard" Predator, while a larger genetically enhanced Predator was CGI, though both Prince and Canadian actor Kyle Strauts, standing at 6 ft 10 in (2.08 m) served as stand-ins on set. In the prequel Prey, Dane DiLiegro plays a more primitive version of the Predator. This iteration relies more on brute strength and hand-to-hand combat than the stealth-based tactics of later Predators, using metal spear tips and arrows instead of plasma-based weaponry. Its mask is made of bone rather than the smooth steel of later Predators, though it functions the same way. While visually distinct, this version of the Predator adheres to the species' honor code and spares those it doesn't deem a threat. For Predator: Badlands, Dimitrius Schuster-Koloamatangi portrays a young runt Predator named Dek. For this iteration, Dek's body was portrayed by a traditional Predator suit, while the face was CGI motion capture.

=== Special and make-up effects ===
The portrayal of the Predator throughout the film franchise has relied on a combination of practical effects and visual effects techniques. To create the creature's distinctive green luminescent blood, filmmakers used a mixture of glow stick fluid and K-Y Jelly. Green was chosen after attempts at making the creatures blood orange failed. The blend produced a bright glow on camera but degraded quickly, requiring frequent reapplication between takes. First developed for the original film, variations of this method were later used in subsequent installments. The thermal vision effect for the Predator's point of view was achieved using a low-resolution thermal imaging camera. The camera's output was reflected through a beam splitter onto a monitor, which was then filmed alongside the optical background using a standard film camera. Because high temperatures reduced the visibility of human figures, portions of the jungle were cooled with ice water to maintain contrast. The final effect combined the heat-sensor imagery with the filmed background to produce the Predator's thermal vision. For the 2018 film The Predator the effect was achieved by digitally manipulating the camera footages colour instead of with a thermal camera.

The Predator's invisibility cloak in the first two films was achieved through an intricate optical compositing process developed by R/Greenberg Associates under visual effects supervisor Joel Hynek. The concept was reportedly inspired by a dream described by one of the screenwriters, involving a chrome figure inside a reflective sphere that became visible only when it moved. To replicate this effect, filmmakers created a background-refracting distortion using photochemical techniques. A performer wore a bright red Predator suit, selected for its strong contrast with jungle greens and sky blues to facilitate chroma key compositing. Each shot was filmed twice from the same camera position—‌once with the red-suited performer and once as a clean background plate, using different camera lens focal lengths. When composited together the resulting visual distortion produced concentric inline mattes creating a semi-invisible appearance. Later entries in the franchise replaced this analog method with digital versions created through computer-generated imagery.

Creature suit design and execution for the first two films were handled by Stan Winston Studio. For the Alien vs. Predator films, these duties shifted to Amalgamated Dynamics, founded by Stan Winston alumni Tom Woodruff Jr. and Alec Gillis; the company later returned for The Predator (2018), Prey (2022), and Predator: Badlands, the latter in collaboration with Wētā Workshop. The 2010 film Predators employed KNB EFX Group. Various visual effects studios have contributed to the depiction of the Predator's technologies, including its cloaking devices and energy-based weaponry.

=== Name ===
Across the first five films in the series—‌Predator (1987), Predator 2 (1990), Predators (2010), The Predator (2018), and Prey (2022)—‌as well as in Aliens vs Predator: Requiem (2007), the creatures are identified in the end credits as Predators. The term is also used diegetically by human characters in Predator 2 and The Predator, establishing it as the principal designation within the franchise. Various incidental descriptors are used by human characters in individual films, such as references as a “hunter” or “the demon who makes trophies of men” in Predator (1987), or “Mupitsi” in Prey (2022), the latter derived from Pia Mupitsi ('Mother owl'), a monster in Comanche folklore.

In licensed expanded-universe media, the species has been given additional nomenclature. Yautja was introduced in the 1994 novel Alien vs. Predator: Prey, while Hish-qu-Ten was later introduced in the 2006 novel Predator: Forever Midnight, where it is presented as an ancestral or alternative designation. The term Yautja was incorporated into film continuity in 2025, appearing in Predator: Killer of Killers and in Predator: Badlands.

== Characteristics ==
=== Appearance and capabilities ===
Broad concept's the same. The difference is, this is a different individual. A different individual of the same species. As is a snake is a snake, but different snakes are different. Their colorings are different, different parts of their characteristics, their facial structures, subtle differences.

— Stan Winston describing the Predator in Predator 2 and explaining the reason for the varying designs and looks of the Predators.

Predators are typically depicted as physically distinguished from humans by their arthropod-like mandibles, and long, dredlock-like appendages on their heads. Predator blood is depicted as bioluminescent green, and they possess infrared vision, which can be augmented by bio-masks that enhance their perception across multiple spectra, including ultraviolet. Typical armaments include various bladed weapons and a shoulder mounted plasma-powered cannon. They are generally larger and stronger than humans, skilled in climbing and navigating complex terrain, and are able to survive multiple gunshot wounds. However, Predators are not invulnerable, as the films depict the creatures carrying portable surgical kits to treat injuries. Though capable of surviving exposure in Antarctic temperatures for an extended period of time, it is implied that Predators have a preference for hot equatorial climates. Predator 2 establishes the creatures are carnivorous as the Predator is shown visiting a slaughterhouse every two days to consume stored meat.

As the Predator film series has progressed, the design of the titular creatures has been modified in various ways to meet the needs of individual productions, including differences in skin color and pattern and variations in the design of masks and armor. In Predator 2, the main Predator was designed to look more urban and hip than its predecessor. Design changes included tribal ornamentation on the forehead, which was made steeper and shallower, brighter skin coloration and a greater number of fangs. In Alien vs. Predator, the appearance of the Predators was redesigned to make them seem more heroic. Redesigns included a reduction in head and waist size, broader shoulders, a more muscular physique, piranha-like teeth on the upper jaw, and dryer and less clammy skin to further differentiate them from the Aliens. In Aliens vs. Predator: Requiem, the Predator was returned to the sleeker design concept prior to Alien vs. Predator. For the so-called "Black Super Predators" in the 2010 film Predators, the designers used the differences between a cassette tape and an iPod as an analogy in differentiating the new subspecies from the original. The Super Predators were designed as leaner and taller than the "classic" Predator design, and they have longer faces, tighter armor, and more swept back dreadlocks. The so-called "Feral Predator" from Prey was described as hailing from a desertic location in another hemisphere of the Predator homeworld. The design aimed to make it scarier and less humanoid, such as more spaced eyes and a bone mask that did not fully cover his mandibles, which director Dan Trachtenberg considered that, "allowed for a very visceral, emotional articulation even while it's masked."

=== Fictional culture and history ===
The Predator society builds sophisticated spaceships, yet they should not look as sleek and hi-tech as a Star Wars stormtrooper. They are a tribal culture, yet their look should not be as primitive as the orcs from Lord of the Rings. They are also a warrior culture, so the ornate cannot conflict with the practical.

— Alec Gillis on Predator designs.

Predator culture revolves around the stalking and hunting of dangerous lifeforms. After making a kill, Predators typically skin and hang the corpse inverted, or decapitate the carcass to take the skull as a trophy. If immobilized or near death, a Predator may activate a self-destruct mechanism in its wristband to erase evidence of its presence. Predators generally attack only life forms capable of providing a challenge, indicating that hunting serves as a form of sportsmanship or rite of passage.

==== Language ====
The Predators are depicted communicating using a combination of written and vocal language. Their written script is presented as a series of patterned dashes, while vocally they have been depicted mimicking human speech in a manner analogous to a hunter's duck call, sometimes using their bio masks to enhance interpretation and production of human languages. Author Steve Perry designed a constructed language set for the Aliens vs. Predator novel series. For Predator: Badlands, a consistent written and verbal language for the Predators was developed for the film by the language creator Britton Watkins. Predator vocalizations in the films were designed using recordings of various real-world animals, including lions, tigers, leopards, jaguars, cougars, snow leopards, black bears, grizzly bears, dolphins, alligators, and camels. Human voice actors, such as Peter Cullen and Hal Rayle, also contributed to the creatures’ speech and sounds.

==== Folklore and conduct ====
Predators appear in human folklore. In some Latin American cultures, they are referred to as "El Diablo que hace trofeos de los hombres" (“The Demon who makes trophies of men”), and Jamaican superstition describes them as spirit-world entities. When hunting humans, Predators usually avoid unarmed individuals, children, and pregnant women unless attacked. Humans who kill a Predator or a Xenomorph in single combat or fight alongside one may be spared and occasionally gifted a weapon as a mark of respect. Novice Predators mark their first successful Xenomorph kill by scoring their helmet and forehead with the prey's acidic blood.

Predators generally operate alone, even when appearing in groups, showing little organized teamwork. They have been shown to capture Aliens for use in controlled hunting reserves. Aliens vs. Predator: Requiem depicts a trophy room containing a creature resembling the "Space Jockey" from Alien, a detail confirmed in the DVD commentary. In Predators, a brief view of an Xenomorph skull is visible in a Predator encampment, while the lower jaw of another is mounted on the Berserker Predator's helmet.

==== Historical presence ====
The franchise depicts Predators as a technologically advanced species that has visited Earth for millennia. Predator: Badlands features a Tyrannosaurus rex skull among their trophies, suggesting visits during the late Cretaceous period. Neanderthal remains in Predators suggest early hominins were also hunted. Predators are shown to have interacted with human civilizations across periods such as feudal Japan, Viking-era Scandinavia, and World War II, as depicted in Predator: Killer of Killers.

Predators are shown contacting civilizations including the Ancient Egyptians, Khmer Empire, Aztecs, Comanche Nation, and a fictional culture on Bouvetøya. Early humans worshipped Predators as gods, and they taught pyramid construction in exchange for human sacrifices to serve as hosts for Xenomorphs. Predators returned to hunt the Xenomorphs in the Bouvetøya pyramids every hundred years, but a Xenomorph outbreak led them to detonate a bomb, destroying the civilization and all but one of their pyramids. Relations with humans subsequently became adversarial.

The prequel Prey (2022), set in 1719, depicts a more primitive Predator targeting a Comanche tribe and French voyageurs in the Great Plains of North America. A flintlock pistol used to defeat this Predator reappears in Predator 2 (1990), maintaining continuity.

===== Contemporary era =====
By the late 20th century, Predators employ advanced technology, including personal cloaking devices, thermal vision, and plasma based weaponry. In Predator (1987), a lone Predator hunts military personnel in Central America, and introduces the Predator using, vocal mimicry, trophy collection, and self-destruction. Set 10 years later, Predator 2 (1990) relocates to Los Angeles, depicting a clan of Predators in a concealed spacecraft. The appearance of an elder Predator and the ceremonial gifting of the 1715 pistol suggest a formalized hierarchy and tradition, while the presence of a trophy case on their ship featuring a Xenomorph skull, among others hints at a broader scope of hunting that extends beyond Earth.

In Alien vs. Predator (2004) depicts the final remaining buried pyramid in Antarctica, functioning as an arena for young Predators to hunt Xenomorphs bred from human hosts, to be used in hunting rite of passage ritual. While a temporary alliance between Predators and humans suggest cross-species respect, the resulting outbreak results in the destruction of the final pyramid. As a result, a subsequent Xenomorph outbreak is depicted in Aliens vs. Predator: Requiem (2007). A Predator contains a Xenomorph outbreak using forensic tools and containment measures, suggesting the species has a structured oversight. The film introduces Predator technology falling into human hands, setting the stage for future developments in the Alien series timeline.

==== Subspecies and variants ====
In Predators, it is revealed that there is a subspecies of Predator belonging to a different tribe -the Super Predators- which are engaged in a long-lasting blood feud with the standard Predators. While standard Predators travel to other worlds to hunt their prey, Super Predators abduct their prey to take to a designated game preserve planet. The film also introduced a pack of spined, quadrupedal beasts used as flushing dogs by the Super Predators. Creature designer Greg Nicotero used hyenas as a basis for the creature's physique and the spines were added later by Chris Olivia.

The Predator (2018) depicts genetically enhanced Predators, combining human and alien DNA to increase physical capabilities. They target Earth for colonization and exploit ecological collapse. A rogue Predator attempts to arm humans with defensive technology, indicating internal ideological divisions within the species.

==== Future ====
Set in the distant future after the events of the film Alien: Resurrection, Predator: Badlands shows the Predators hunting lifeforms from worlds other than Earth, and establishes that Predators hunt in order to gain status in their clans, with Predators considered runts regarded as being weak and unworthy of survival within their society.

== Expanded universe ==
=== Comics and Novels ===
In the Aliens vs. Predator novel series (based on the Dark Horse Comics) by David Bischoff, Steve and Stephani Perry, the Predators are depicted as living in a matriarchal clan-based society bearing similarities to a pack mentality whose strongest and most skilled of the group lead. The Predators are portrayed as sexually dimorphic mammals. It is also revealed that their blood has the capacity of partially neutralizing the acidity of Alien blood. Their religion is partially explored in the series, showing that they are polytheistic, and that their equivalent of the Grim Reaper is the so-called "Black Warrior," who is seen as an eternal adversary who eventually wins all battles.

Predator veterans at a celebratory feast in Aliens vs. Predator: Chained to Life and Death

In Randy Stradley's miniseries Aliens vs. Predator: War, it is revealed through the narration of the character Machiko Noguchi that Predators were responsible for the spread of Aliens throughout the galaxy, though the Predators deny this, stating that their large interplanetary distribution is due to simultaneous convergent evolution.

The comic series Predator and Aliens vs Predator: Three World War introduce a clan of Predators referred to as "Killers," who are enemies of mainstream Predators (here called "Hunters") because of their tradition of training Aliens as attack animals rather than hunting them, as well as their desire for killing as opposed to honorable hunting. The character Machiko Noguchi notes in issue #1 of Three World War that "You have to understand the mindset of the Hunters, and the honor they place on facing a worthy opponent on an equal footing ... a kill is the end result, but it's not the point of a hunt ... For the 'Killers', that wasn't the case. They were all about the killing." They are first seen in the 2009 Predator series, where a number interfere in an East African civil war, coming into conflict with both humans and their Hunter counterparts. By the time of Three World War the Killers are assumed to have been wiped out by the Hunters, but some survive and begin attacking human colonies, forcing Noguchi to forge an alliance between humans and the Hunters in order to deal with them.

In John Shirley's stand-alone novel Predator: Forever Midnight, Predators, now referred to as "Hish," are shown to possess a gland located between their neck and collarbone which secretes powerful hormones into their bloodstream and which drives them to hyper-aggression. When this gland is overstimulated, it sends the creatures into a frenzied rage, causing them to attempt killing any living thing in sight, including members of their own species. This "kill rage" can be contagious and spread from one Predator to another, driving them all to attack each other. The Predators as a species barely survived the wars provoked by their kill glands, and they have learned to control the gland's secretions with artificial hormone regulators.

In Ian Edginton and Alex Maleev's graphic novel Aliens vs. Predator: Eternal and the videogame Predator: Concrete Jungle, Predator flesh and blood, if consumed, is shown to have the capacity of greatly lengthening a human's lifespan.

=== Video games ===
In the 2020 video game Predator: Hunting Grounds, the Predator species appears as one of two playable factions in the asymmetric multiplayer mode known as Hunt. The mode pits a single player-controlled Predator against four player-controlled Human special operations soldiers called the fireteam, which mirrors the setup of the first Predator film. The Predator player hunts the fireteam from a third-person perspective and attempts to prevent their escape before the timer expires, using weapons and abilities taken from the films and comic books. The fireteam works together to complete objectives and escape while avoiding the Predator and hostile AI units, which they encounter through a traditional first-person tactical shooter perspective. At the start of each match, the characters are unaware that a Predator is nearby, which serves as the narrative reason for the conflict. The game is presented as a spiritual successor to the original films and tells additional story content through fully voiced cassette tapes. These recordings expand the timeline and connect characters such as Dutch (Arnold Schwarzenegger, Predator 1987), Sean Keyes (Jake Busey, The Predator 2018), son of Peter Keyes (Gary Busey, Predator 2 1990), and Isabelle (Alice Braga, Predators 2010). All tapes are voiced by the original actors. Dutch's activities between the 1987 Val-Verde incident and the game's 2025 setting are detailed in free DLC recordings voiced by Schwarzenegger. In 2025 Dutch is in his late seventies, although his life has been extended unintentionally through Predator medical technology, giving him the strength and physique of a man in his forties. After the events of the original film, Dutch devoted himself to hunting Predators and now serves as a consultant and mercenary for the OWLF ("Other Worldly Life Forms").

=== Animated series ===
==== Aliens vs. Predator: Annihilation ====
In May 2023, Alien Day founder Josh Izzo revealed that "10 episodes of a fully completed Alien vs. Predator anime series" had been completed at 20th Century Fox, intended for a Netflix release prior to its acquisition by Disney, had been produced by Eric Calderon and Dave Baker, and directed by Shinji Aramaki, but was yet to see official release from the Disney Vault, despite completion. Originally developed as an adaptation of Dark Horse Comics' The Machiko Noguchi Saga, with Izzio using the comic as the basis for storyboards in his pitch, the series was redeveloped by Aramaki as a "deep future"-set story set years after the events of Alien Resurrection, told from the perspective of a Predator clan (including a cyborg and a bone-weapon-wielding warrior named "Bone") as they hunt down Xenomorphs. The unreleased anime series was revealed to be titled Aliens vs. Predator: Annihilation.

== Critical reception and legacy ==
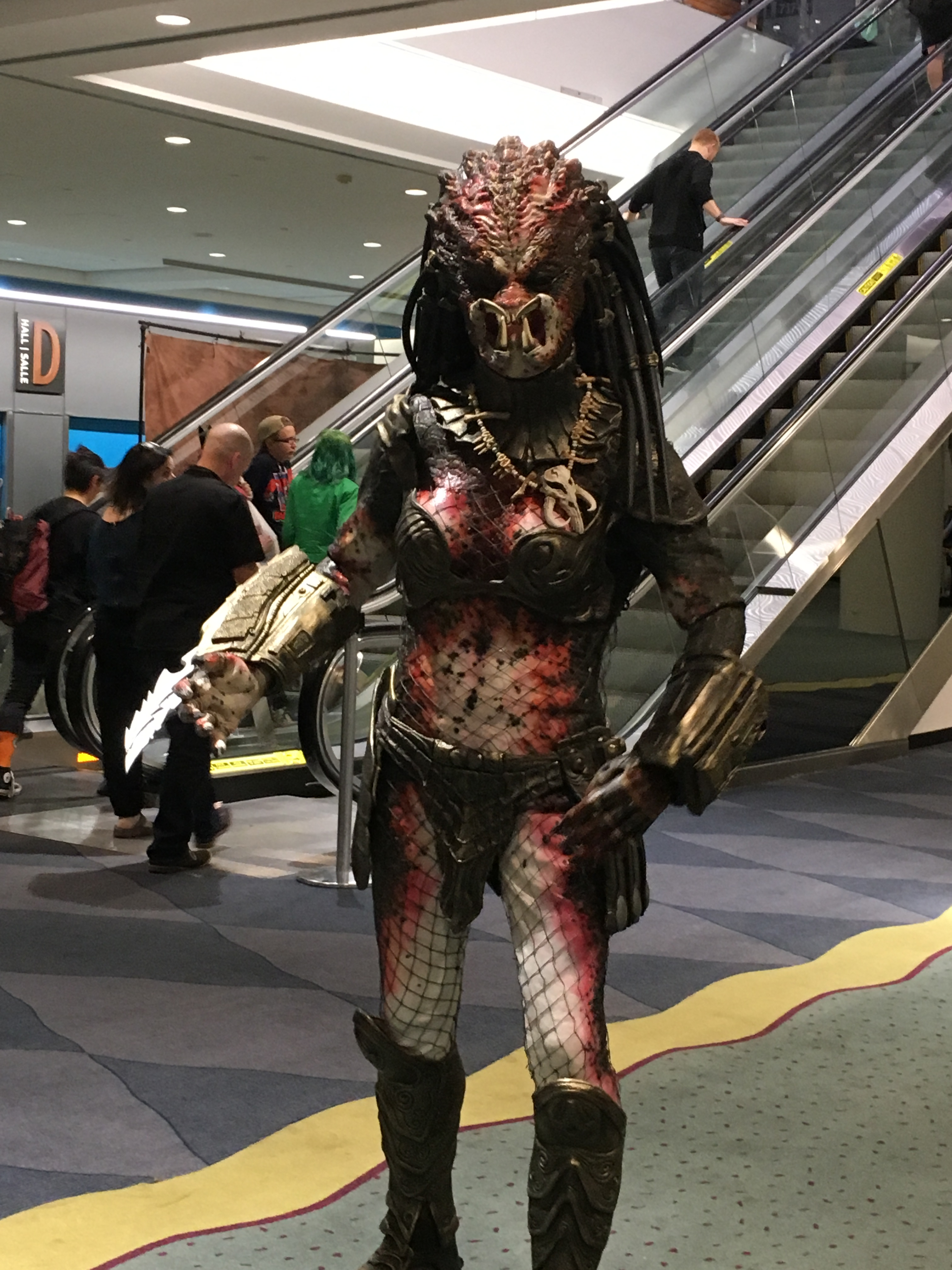
A science fiction fan dressed as a female Predator for cosplay

Stan Winston's design for the Predator was widely regarded as a visually distinctive and memorable creation. Critics highlighted its alien anatomy, noting its insect-like mandibles and muscular humanoid form, which evoked fear in viewers and provoked fascination with its otherworldly appearance. The creature's portrayal as an efficient and relentless hunter, as opposed to a simple mindless beast or psychopathic killer, was seen as a key element of its appeal. Its heat-vision perspective has been noted as in innovation in cinematic language.

=== Thematic analysis ===
The Predator has been interpreted as a subversion of traditional masculinity, as it uses a combination of brute strength, advanced technology, and predatory cunning to highlight the limitations and vulnerabilities of conventional action-hero tropes. Through its unrelenting and impartial method of hunting, the Predator mirrors the hypermasculinity of the film's lead characters, exposing their arrogance, pride, and rigid codes of honor that ultimately make them vulnerable, showing that traits often celebrated as strength in action heroes can be self-destructive. Scholars have interpreted the Predator as a critique of human violence and imperial hubris, reading the alien as a representation of colonial fears of Indigenous hunters silently stalking and overpowering intruders in a “New World” jungle. The Predator's methodical and relentless hunting exposes the destructiveness and arrogance of expansionist impulses, reflecting the violent consequences of colonial and military endeavors. Subsequent entries in the franchise, such as Prey, have been noted for reframing the narrative to center Indigenous perspectives. The Predator character serves as a reflection of humanity's own predatory instincts, which forces viewers to reflect on the ethical implications of violence and predation, questioning what separates us from the monsters we fear. Robert Rodriguez, producer of the 2010 film, stated that the title "Predators" is a double meaning, referring to not just the alien hunters but the human characters as well. In Predator 2, certain scholars interpreted the Predator as being racially coded as Black through visual cues such as dreadlocks, tribal-like weaponry, and associations with Jamaican gang characters, while in contrast, the protagonist Lieutenant Harrigan, a Black police officer played by Danny Glover, was seen as embodying “heroic Blackness” by operating within but also being marginalized by the law enforcement system.

=== In popular culture ===
The Predators have become one of the most recognizable and enduring figures in science fiction, with the concept of an extraterrestrial hunter stalking humans becoming a recurring influence on subsequent media.

In the 2015 side-scrolling shooter Broforce, the Predator appears as a playable character known as the Brodator. Like the Predator, he uses his signature wrist blades but also uses throwing spears as a ranged weapon. His special skill lets him turn invisible and upon putting in certain button inputs, he can explode before properly dying.

In the first-person shooting video game Call of Duty: Ghosts, the Predator appears as a hidden killstreak on the multiplayer map "Ruins" from the Devastation map pack. The player can play as Predator for a brief period by completing a Field Order and obtaining a care package. The Predator is also a playable guest character via downloadable content in the fighting game Mortal Kombat X, opposite an Alien.

In the tactical shooting video game Tom Clancy's Ghost Recon Wildlands, a live event titled "The Hunt" was released on December 14, 2017. During this event, players may take part in a bonus campaign mission in the Caimanes district to battle the Predator, with the event lasting until January 2018.

A Predator and its ship made a guest appearance in Fortnite Battle Royale as the collaboration outfit for the Chapter 2 Season 5 Battle Pass. One of the many iconic hunters attempted to be hired as part of Agent Jones' initiative to maintain order inside the game, the Predator could not be convinced, instead opting to hunt Jones himself. After accidentally following Jones through a rift into the Fortnite world, the Predator set himself up inside a jungle compound, and is "eager to sample all the new prey the island has to offer".

In October 2023, the Rick and Morty seventh season premiere, "How Poopy Got His Poop Back," licensed a Predator from 20th Century Studios to serve as a recurring character in the animated series by Adult Swim. In the episode, written by Nick Rutherford and directed by Lucas Gray, Wayne "Mr. Poopybutthole" reveals he hired a "Predator P.I." to follow his ex-wife Amy, only for the group to learn that she is now dating the Predator. By the end of the episode, Wayne accepts the relationship, and Amy introduces the character as Gul'Karna, Clan Leader of the Skin Thieves.

In October 2025, the Predator returned to the Call of Duty franchise with Call of Duty: Warzone and the Call of Duty: Black Ops 6 in an event called "The Haunting". The event featured multiple iterations of the Predator, including the original, the Feral Predator from Prey, and Dek from Badlands.

== See also ==
- Xenomorph - creature in Alien franchise
