= Predator 2 =

1990 film by Stephen Hopkins

- Theatrical release poster
- Directed by: Stephen Hopkins
- Written by: Jim Thomas; John Thomas
- Based on: Characters by: Jim Thomas; John Thomas
- Produced by: Lawrence Gordon; Joel Silver; John Davis
- Starring: Danny Glover; Gary Busey; Rubén Blades; María Conchita Alonso; Bill Paxton; Robert Davi
- Cinematography: Peter Levy
- Edited by: Mark Goldblatt; Bert Lovitt
- Music by: Alan Silvestri
- Production companies: 20th Century Fox; Silver Pictures; Gordon Company; Davis Entertainment
- Distributed by: 20th Century Fox
- Release date: November 21, 1990
- Running time: 108 minutes
- Country: United States
- Language: English
- Budget: $20–30 million
- Box office: $57.1 million

Predator 2 is a 1990 American science fiction horror film, directed by Stephen Hopkins and written by brothers Jim and John Thomas. It is the second installment of the Predator franchise and a standalone sequel to Predator (1987). The film stars Danny Glover, Gary Busey, Rubén Blades, María Conchita Alonso, Bill Paxton, and Robert Davi, with Kevin Peter Hall reprising his role as the Predator. Set ten years after the first film, the story follows a disgruntled police detective battling a malevolent and technologically advanced extraterrestrial in the streets of Los Angeles.

When approached to write a sequel, Jim and John Thomas opted to change the setting from the isolated jungle of the first film to an inner-city urban area. Stephen Hopkins was chosen to direct the film following his work on A Nightmare on Elm Street 5: The Dream Child (1989). Although initial drafts featured the return of Arnold Schwarzenegger from the previous film, he declined due to a pay dispute.

Predator 2 was released on November 21, 1990, and grossed $57 million worldwide. Although it initially received generally negative reviews, the film has since gained a cult following. It was followed by the crossover film Alien vs. Predator in 2004, and a third mainline installment, Predators, in 2010.

== Plot ==
In 1997, Los Angeles is experiencing a heat wave and a turf war between heavily armed Colombian and Jamaican drug cartels. A Predator watches a shootout between the gangs and the LAPD, observing as Lieutenant Mike Harrigan charges into the firefight to rescue two wounded officers and drive the Colombians back into their hideout. The Predator assaults the Colombians, causing a disturbance that prompts Harrigan and detectives Leona Cantrell and Danny Archuleta to defy orders and enter the hideout, where they find the slaughtered Colombians. On the roof, the crazed gang leader gets a glimpse of the Predator and shoots at it before falling to his death after Harrigan shoots him. Harrigan also briefly sees the invisible Predator, but dismisses it as a mirage due to his acrophobia.

At the station, his superiors reprimand Harrigan for his disobedience. He is then introduced to Special Agent Peter Keyes, the leader of a task force investigating the cartels, and Detective Jerry Lambert, the newest member of Harrigan's team. Later that evening, Jamaicans invade the Colombian drug lord's penthouse and murder him before they are killed in turn by the Predator, who spares the drug lord's girlfriend. Upon their arrival, Harrigan's team notes the similarities between the crime scene and the earlier Colombian massacre, including the flayed corpses, until Keyes's team arrives and removes them.

Despite being chased out, Danny later returns alone when nobody else is present, finding one of the Predator's spear tips in a vent before the creature kills him. As an enraged Harrigan vows to stop Danny's killer, forensic analysis reveals the spear tip is not composed of any known element on the periodic table. Seeking answers, Harrigan meets with Jamaican drug lord King Willie, a voodoo practitioner who believes the killer is supernatural and that he should prepare himself for battle against it. After Harrigan leaves, the Predator duels and kills King Willie, taking his head as a trophy. Tracing a lead indicating Danny's killer had recently been in a slaughterhouse, Harrigan arranges to meet his team at the warehouse district to investigate.

Leona and Lambert take the subway there, but are ambushed by the Predator, who kills Lambert and numerous armed passengers but spares Leona after its helmet's scanners indicate that she is pregnant. Arriving in time to see it claim Lambert's skull and spine, Harrigan chases the fleeing Predator, but Keyes's men intercept him. Keyes reveals that the monster is an extraterrestrial hunter with infrared vision and active camouflage that has been hunting humans for sport, most recently a decade earlier in Central America. (Note: As depicted in Predator (1987).) Keyes and his team have set a trap in a nearby slaughterhouse, using thermally insulated suits with mounted ultraviolet lights and cryogenic weapons to capture it for study. However, the suspicious Predator, upon hearing their footsteps, uses its scanners to track, outmaneuver, and slaughter Keyes's men via their lights.

Harrigan attacks and wounds the Predator, but it destroys his weapon. It prepares to finish him off before Keyes tries to freeze the creature, but the Predator kills Keyes by throwing a Smart Disc at him. The Predator then chases Harrigan to the roof, where they clash until they are left hanging from a ledge. The creature activates a self-destruct device on its forearm, which Harrigan severs with the disc, disarming it. The Predator enters an apartment, where it treats its wounds and flees. Harrigan pursues it to a spacecraft hidden underground and engages it in combat, ultimately killing the Predator with its disc.

Just then, a small group of cloaked Predators arrives to collect their comrade's body. Their leader rewards Harrigan with a flintlock pistol, engraved "Raphael Adolini 1715", for killing the Predator. As the ship takes off, Harrigan escapes to the surface and meets with a member of Keyes' team, who is furious that they lost the chance to capture the creature. Despite their defeat, Harrigan muses that the Predators will return.

== Cast ==
- Danny Glover as Lieutenant Mike Harrigan, an LAPD Officer who is investigating rival Jamaican and Colombian drug cartels. He is stubborn and is often criticized by the superior officers for disobeying orders.
- Kevin Peter Hall as City Hunter / The Predator, a member of an alien warrior race that hunts aggressive members of other species for sport, uses active camouflage and a plasma weapon, and can see in the infrared spectrum. Hall also played the Elder Predator, the leader of the Predators at the end of the film.
  - Hal Rayle provides the voice of the Predator, replacing Peter Cullen from the first film.
- Gary Busey as Special Agent Peter Keyes, posed as a DEA agent leading a special task force investigating a drug conspiracy as a cover for his attempts to capture the Predator. The character is a replacement for Dutch, the protagonist of the first film, after Arnold Schwarzenegger declined to reprise the role.
- Rubén Blades as Detective Danny Archuleta, a member of Harrigan's team and a long-time friend of his.
- María Conchita Alonso as Detective Leona Cantrell, an LAPD cop involved in the Jamaican-Colombian gang wars
- Bill Paxton as Detective Jerry Lambert, an LAPD cop, transferred from another precinct into Metro Command.
- Lilyan Chauvin as Dr. Irene Edwards, the chief medical examiner and forensic pathologist of Los Angeles. She aids Harrigan, though being completely cut out of the official investigation by Keyes's team.
- Robert Davi as Deputy Chief Phil Heinemann.
- Adam Baldwin as Agent Adam Garber, a member of Keyes's task force.
- Kent McCord as Captain Brent Pilgrim, an LAPD cop, and Harrigan's immediate boss.
- Steve Kahan as Sergeant Neil Reeger, an LAPD SWAT Sergeant.
- Henry Kingi as "El Scorpio", a violent member of the Colombian Scorpions. Kingi previously appeared in the first film as an insurgent pursued by Dutch Schaefer.
- Morton Downey Jr. as Tony Pope, a journalist who reports the gruesome and murderous homicides left by the Predator. He is constantly criticized by the police for interfering with investigations.
- Calvin Lockhart as Willie "King Willie", the boss of the Jamaica Voodoo Posse. He appears to be psychic because of his voodoo beliefs.
- Sylvia Kauders as Ruth Albright, an elderly lady.
- Billy "Sly" Williams as Jackson, a paramedic.
- Jsu Garcia (Credited as Nick Corri) as Dvorkin, an LAPD detective.
- Michael Wiseman as Zinck, an LAPD officer.
- Teri Weigel as Ramon Vega's Colombian mistress.

Elpidia Carrillo reprises her role as Anna Gonsalves from the first film in a cameo appearance. She aids government agents in a videotape, showing the devastating after-effects of the first Predator's self-destruct device to the U.S. Army. Carrillo filmed an additional scene in which she talks to the camera and describes the events of the first film, but this scene was cut.

== Production ==
Once 20th Century Fox approached Predator screenwriters Jim and John Thomas to write a sequel, they pitched six ideas, one of which was "putting the creature in an urban jungle", which the studio liked. The eventual setting was Los Angeles, blighted by gang warfare during a severe heat wave, creating the ideal "hot spot" in which the Predator hunts targets. The script was then developed in just three weeks. A goal of the sequel was to expand on the Predator's origins and motives, showing the creature has been visiting the planet for centuries, is not psychopathic, but just interested in hunting, and exploring its spacecraft's interior.

Producer Joel Silver invited director Stephen Hopkins, who drew his interest while directing A Nightmare on Elm Street 5: The Dream Child (1989). As Hopkins joined production before the screenplay was finished, he worked closely with the Thomases in the script revisions and storyboarding the sequences they had written. For the lead role of LAPD police officer Harrigan, Hopkins had originally envisioned Patrick Swayze playing the role, teaming up with a returning Arnold Schwarzenegger, who starred as Dutch in the first film. Hopkins also met with Steven Seagal for the role; although the actor was interested in starring in the film and had his own ideas about the character, wanting to portray him as a CIA psychiatrist and martial arts expert, Hopkins ultimately decided against it, as he wanted the character to be an average Joe type. Due to a dispute over salary, Schwarzenegger declined to return to the sequel, and Silver brought in three actors he had worked with in Lethal Weapon: Gary Busey, Steve Kahan, and Danny Glover in the role of Harrigan. Production was split between location shooting, mostly at night, and soundstage filming.

The main Predator was designed to look more urban and hip than its predecessor. Design changes included tribal ornamentation on the forehead, which is steeper and shallower, brighter skin coloration, and a greater number of fangs. Describing the new Predator's design, Stan Winston said, "Broad concept's the same. The difference is, this is a different individual. A different individual of the same species. As in a snake is a snake, but different snakes are different. Their colorings are different, different parts of their characteristics, their facial structures, subtle differences." Production designer Lawrence Paull said that with the Predator ship, he attempted "a space vehicle unlike anything that had ever been designed before", a snail-shaped vessel whose interior was "both technological and reptilian, where the creature and its ship blend and work together". Since the Alien franchise is also owned by Fox, with effects work by Winston, the crew included a Xenomorph head among the trophy skulls in the Predator ship.

Predator 2 is set ten years after the original, which was the then-future of 1997, leading to some developments like new video technology and a nonexistent subway in Los Angeles. (The Los Angeles Metro Rail started operating the same year as the film's release.) For the set design, Paul aimed for a "kind of retrograde future that's equal parts Brazil and Blade Runner mixed in with modern-day technology", with "big and outrageous" structures but simpler prop design, such as boxy and colorless cars.

The MPAA initially gave Predator 2 an NC-17 rating, so several cuts were made to bring it down to an R rating.

Toward the end of filming, a short unofficial music video was made, with Danny Glover dancing with the Predator and others.

== Music ==
Alan Silvestri returned to score the sequel, conducting the Skywalker Symphony Orchestra. Whereas the first film did not have its music released until years later, a soundtrack album for the sequel was issued on December 13, 1990, from Varèse Sarabande. On December 1, 2014, the label issued Predator 2: The Deluxe Edition.

== Release ==
=== Home media ===
In the United States, Predator 2 was released on VHS on May 16 and LaserDisc on September 20, 1991 by Fox Video. The film also received a subtitled Japanese LaserDisc release in 1993. In the United States, it was subsequently released on DVD in 2003. This was followed by a two-disc special edition DVD in January 2005, a Blu-ray on June 9, 2009, and a 4K UHD Blu-Ray on August 7, 2018. In Australia (Region 4), it was released on DVD in 2001 by 20th Century Fox Home Entertainment South Pacific. Due to the film's violence, the early Australian releases had an R18+ rating (equivalent to an NC-17 rating in the US), although home video reissues from the mid-2000s onward had a less legally restrictive MA15+ rating. In Region 2 (the United Kingdom), Fox released it on DVD in 2004.

=== Rights ===
In 2019, Rupert Murdoch sold most of 21st Century Fox's film and television assets to Disney, with Predator 2 and the rest of the films in the franchise being included as part of this deal. Predator 2 has since been made available on streaming service Hulu, which was one of the additional assets Disney acquired from Fox. It was also made available on Disney+ in certain territories without Hulu.

== Reception ==
=== Box office ===
Released on November 21, 1990, Predator 2 was #4 at the US box office in its opening weekend, with a gross of over $8 million behind the films Dances with Wolves, Three Men and a Little Lady, and Twentieth Century Fox's own film Home Alone. The film grossed a total of $57 million, $30 million of which was from the United States. The worldwide box office revenue totaled $57,120,318 in ticket sales. The film became the lowest-grossing film in the Predator franchise.

=== Critical response ===
In 1990, the film's reviews were generally negative, though reviewers were generally impressed by the casting of Danny Glover as an action hero. On review aggregation website Rotten Tomatoes, the film received an approval rating of 36% based on 119 reviews. The site's consensus states: "The thrill of the hunt is gone in this hackneyed sequel." On Metacritic, the film has a weighted average score of 46 out of 100 based on 19 critics, indicating "mixed or average reviews". Audiences polled by CinemaScore gave the film an average grade of "B+" on an A+ to F scale.

The reviewers for The Washington Post were split: Rita Kempley enjoyed the film, saying that it had "the dismal irony of RoboCop and the brooding fatalism of Blade Runner", and that Glover "brings an unusual depth to the action-adventure and proves fiercely effective as the Predator's new nemesis". Desson Howe said the film was "blithely unoriginal" and numbingly violent, but also praised Glover's ability to bring warmth to the center of a cold film.

In her review for The New York Times, Janet Maslin called the film "an unbeatable contender" for the "most mindless, mean-spirited action film of the holiday season". Chicago Sun-Times critic Roger Ebert, in giving the film two out of four stars, suggested that it represents an "angry and ugly" dream. He said that the creatures' design had racist undertones where "subliminal clues [...] encourage us to subconsciously connect the menace with black males".

Not all opinions of Glover's work were positive. Desmond Ryan of The Philadelphia Inquirer thought that Glover was slumming in a thankless role although he was not the film's worst actor -- Ryan was most disgusted with Downey, Jr., calling his work a "monstrosity." Michael Reid of the Victoria Times-Colonist cited Glover as "wasted" but saw shrewdness in the casting of Downey, Jr.

=== Legacy ===
Several retrospective reviews have considered the film underrated, and it has gained a cult following. (Note: Multiple references ascribe a cult following:)

Later, director Stephen Hopkins said: "It's so over the top. I just sort of went for it and made the biggest, boldest, loudest movie I could make. I was only 29 years old – I was like a rampant child, running around Los Angeles, blowing the shit out of everything and making things as bloody as possible." About the modest reception at the box office and the cult status since its release, he added "It had a big initial opening weekend if I remember correctly – but I think many people were disappointed that Arnold wasn't in it. A lot of people like the film and some prefer it to the original – just because it's in a city and more contemporary."

Danny Glover was proud of his performance, saying:

I have two films I've done that I feel that I was bigger than life in, in which I felt that I could control the space. Silverado for me, and Predator 2. In Predator 2, it was like 'who's the baddest cat in your space, and the baddest cat says 'I'm gonna challenge you.' Mano y mano. I was the baddest guy in his space. What happens? I kill him, and then the others come around, and I'm like 'alright... who's next?' I was about 42, 43.. in the best shape in my life, best shape I've been in. I was running on the beach, had my training, I was lifting weights a lot more than I am now. I was really feeling it in that movie.

== Franchise ==
=== Sequels ===
A third main film titled Predators was released in 2010. A fourth, The Predator, was released in 2018. A fifth, Predator: Badlands, was released in 2025.

=== Prequel ===
A prequel film set in 1719 titled Prey was released in 2022.

=== Animated film ===
A further film, Predator: Killer of Killers, was released in 2025, which marks the return of Mike Harrigan.

== Other media ==
=== Novelization ===
A novelization written by Simon Hawke was released on December 1, 1990, by the publishing company Jove. It briefly covers the fate of Dutch from the first film. Keyes recalls memories of speaking with the battered Major while infirmed in a hospital, suffering from radiation sickness. Dutch is said to have escaped from the hospital, never to be seen again. It tells a great deal of the story from the Predator's point of view, such as its humiliation of having its mask removed by Harrigan and its reasoning for not killing Cantrell due to its discovery of her pregnancy.

=== Video games ===
The film was adapted as two video games: the first for computer in 1990 and the second for Sega Genesis in 1992.
