= List of Alien, Predator, and Alien vs. Predator games =

This is a chronological list of games in the Alien, Predator and Alien vs. Predator science fiction horror franchises. There have been thirty-seven officially licensed video games, one trading card game, and one tabletop miniatures game released as tie-ins to the franchises.

The first video game of the Alien franchise was released in 1982 for the Atari 2600, based on the 1979 film Alien. Subsequent games were based on that film and its sequels Aliens (1986), Alien 3 (1992), and Alien Resurrection (1997). The first video game in the Predator franchise was released in 1987, the same year as the Predator film on which it was based. Subsequent Predator games were based on that film and its sequels Predator 2 (1990) and Predators (2010). The first game to cross the two franchises was Alien vs. Predator, released in September 1993 and based on an earlier comic book series. Since then the characters and storylines of the two franchises have been officially crossed over in comic books, video games, and the feature films Alien vs. Predator (2004) and Aliens vs. Predator: Requiem (2007). To date, there have been seventeen officially licensed video games released in the Alien franchise, six in the Predator franchise, and fourteen in the Alien vs. Predator franchise. These have been created by various developers and released for a variety of platforms including video game consoles, handheld game consoles, personal computers, and mobile phones. The Aliens vs. Predator Collectible Card Game published in 1997 and the Alien vs. Predator themed sets for HorrorClix released in 2006 are the only non-video games in the franchises.

The stories of the games are set in a fictional universe in which alien races and species have dangerous conflicts with humans and with each other. The games pit human, Alien, and Predator characters against one another in various fights for survival. The settings of the games vary, with most of the stories taking place far in the future.

== Video games ==
=== Titles released in the 1980s ===
Game	Details
Alien Original release date(s): NA: 1982	Release years by system: 1982—Atari 2600
Alien Original release date(s): NA: 1982	Notes: Developed and published by Fox Video Games; Based on the 1979 film Alien.; A Pac-Man style maze video game in which the player controls a human who must collect eggs while avoiding aliens.
Alien Original release date(s): NA: 1984; EU: 1985	Release years by system: 1984—Commodore 64, ZX Spectrum; 1985—Amstrad CPC
Alien Original release date(s): NA: 1984; EU: 1985	Notes: Developed by Amsoft, Concept Software, and Argus Press Software; Published by Argus Press Software Ltd.; Based on the 1979 film Alien.
Aliens: The Computer Game Original release date(s): NA: 1986; EU: 1987	Release years by system: 1986—Commodore 64, ZX Spectrum; 1987—Apple IIe, Amstrad CPC
Aliens: The Computer Game Original release date(s): NA: 1986; EU: 1987	Notes: Developed by Activision and Mr. Micro.; Published in North America by Activision and in Europe as Aliens: US Version by Electric Dreams Software and Alternative Software.; Based on the 1986 film Aliens.
Aliens: The Computer Game Original release date(s): EU: 1986	Release years by system: 1986—Amstrad CPC, Commodore 64, MSX, ZX Spectrum
Aliens: The Computer Game Original release date(s): EU: 1986	Notes: Developed by Software Studios.; Published in Europe Electric Dreams Software and Ricochet, and in Spain by Proein Soft Line.; Based on the 1986 film Aliens.
Aliens: Alien 2 Original release date(s): JP: June 10, 1987	Release years by system: 1987—MSX
Aliens: Alien 2 Original release date(s): JP: June 10, 1987	Notes: Developed and published by Square; Based on the 1986 film Aliens.; Released only in Japan. The title appears in both English and Japanese on the packaging, with the English title as Aliens and the Japanese title translating as Alien 2.; A planned port of this game for the Famicom Disk System was cancelled.; The soundtrack was composed by Nobuo Uematsu.
Predator Original release date(s): NA/PAL/JP: 1987	Release years by system: 1987—Amstrad CPC, Commodore 64, ZX Spectrum; 1988—Acorn Electron, Atari ST, BBC Micro, MSXNintendo Entertainment System, 1989—Amiga
Predator Original release date(s): NA/PAL/JP: 1987	Notes: Developed by Software Studios, Klon (MSX), Source and GlenHills Graphics, Pack-In-Video (NES); Published by Activision, Superior Software, The Hit Squad, and Pack-In-Video.; Based on the 1987 film Predator.; The NES and MSX versions of the game differed.; The NES version was also known as 'Predator- Soon the hunt will begin'.

=== Titles released in the 1990s ===
Game	Details
Aliens Original release date(s): JP: 1990; NA: 1990; EU: 1990; AU: 1990	Release years by system: 1990—Arcade
Aliens Original release date(s): JP: 1990; NA: 1990; EU: 1990; AU: 1990	Notes: Developed and published by Konami.; Based on the 1986 film Aliens.
Predator 2 Original release date(s): NA: 1990; EU: 1991	Release years by system: 1990—PC; 1991—Amiga, Amstrad CPC, Atari ST, Commodore 64, ZX Spectrum
Predator 2 Original release date(s): NA: 1990; EU: 1991	Notes: Developed by Oxford Mobius and Arc Developments.; Published by Konami.; Based on the 1990 film Predator 2.
Predator 2 Original release date(s): EU: 1991; NA: 1992	Release years by system: 1991—Master System; 1992—Game Gear, Mega Drive/Genesis
Predator 2 Original release date(s): EU: 1991; NA: 1992	Notes: Developed by Perfect 10, Perfect Entertainment, and Teeny Weeny Games.; Published by Arena Entertainment.; Based on the 1990 film Predator 2.
Alien 3 Original release date(s): NA/EU/BZ: 1992; JP: May 27, 1994	Release years by system: 1992—Amiga, Commodore 64, Master System; 1993—Nintendo Entertainment System, Mega Drive/Genesis; 1994—Game Gear
Alien 3 Original release date(s): NA/EU/BZ: 1992; JP: May 27, 1994	Notes: Developed by Probe Entertainment and Eden Entertainment Software.; Published In North America, Europe, and Japan by Arena Entertainment, Acclaim Entertainment, LJN, and Virgin Interactive, and in Brazil by Tectoy.; Based on the 1992 film Alien 3.
Alien vs Predator Original release date(s): JP: January 8, 1993; NA: September 1993; AU: 1993	Release years by system: 1993—Super Nintendo Entertainment System
Alien vs Predator Original release date(s): JP: January 8, 1993; NA: September 1993; AU: 1993	Notes: Developed by Jorudan.; Published by Activision (NA, PAL) and IGS (JP).; The Japanese version is titled Aliens vs. Predator and has gameplay differences from the international version.
Alien 3 Original release date(s): NA: January 1993	Release years by system: 1993—Game Boy
Alien 3 Original release date(s): NA: January 1993	Notes: Developed by Bits Studios.; Published by LJN.; Based on the 1992 film Alien 3.
Alien 3 Original release date(s): NA: May 1993; JP: July 9, 1993; EU: October 28, 1993	Release years by system: 1993—Super Nintendo Entertainment System
Alien 3 Original release date(s): NA: May 1993; JP: July 9, 1993; EU: October 28, 1993	Notes: Developed by Probe Entertainment.; Published by LJN.; Based on the 1992 film Alien 3.
Alien vs Predator: The Last of His Clan Original release date(s): JP: September 24, 1993; NA: November 1993	Release years by system: 1993—Game Boy
Alien vs Predator: The Last of His Clan Original release date(s): JP: September 24, 1993; NA: November 1993	Notes: Developed by ASK Kodansha.; Published by Activision.; The Japanese version is titled Alien vs. Predator.
Alien 3: The Gun Original release date(s): JP: 1993	Release years by system: 1993—Arcade
Alien 3: The Gun Original release date(s): JP: 1993	Notes: Published by Sega.; Based on the 1992 film Alien 3.; First-person light gun shooter genre.; Runs on Sega System 32 arcade system board.
Alien vs. Predator Original release date(s): NA/JP/EU/AS: May 20, 1994	Release years by system: 1994—Arcade
Alien vs. Predator Original release date(s): NA/JP/EU/AS: May 20, 1994	Notes: Developed and published by Capcom.
Alien vs Predator Original release date(s): NA: October 20, 1994; EU: 1994	Release years by system: 1994—Atari Jaguar
Alien vs Predator Original release date(s): NA: October 20, 1994; EU: 1994	Notes: Developed by Rebellion Developments.; Published by Atari.
Aliens: A Comic Book Adventure Original release date(s): NA: 1995	Release years by system: 1995—PC
Aliens: A Comic Book Adventure Original release date(s): NA: 1995	Notes: Published by Mindscape.
Alien Trilogy Original release date(s): NA: February, 1996; EU: March, 1996; JP: May 31, 1996	Release years by system: 1996—PlayStation, Sega Saturn, PC
Alien Trilogy Original release date(s): NA: February, 1996; EU: March, 1996; JP: May 31, 1996	Notes: Developed by Probe Entertainment.; Published by Acclaim Entertainment.; Based on the films Alien (1979), Aliens (1986), and Alien 3 (1992).
Aliens Online Original release date(s): NA: March 31, 1998	Release years by system: 1998—PC
Aliens Online Original release date(s): NA: March 31, 1998	Notes: Developed by Mythic Entertainment.; Published by Kesmai.; First-person online shooter/action game where two teams of marines and aliens fought each other.; Required GameStorm gaming service subscription.; The budget for the game was $450,000 USD.
Aliens versus Predator Original release date(s): NA: May 13, 1999; EU: May 25, 1999	Release years by system: 1999—PC, Macintosh
Aliens versus Predator Original release date(s): NA: May 13, 1999; EU: May 25, 1999	Notes: Developed by Rebellion Developments.; Published by Fox Interactive.; Aliens versus Predator 2 is a sequel to this game.

=== Titles released in the 2000s ===
Game	Details
Alien Resurrection Original release date(s): NA: October 10, 2000; EU: December 1, 2000	Release years by system: 2000—PlayStation
Alien Resurrection Original release date(s): NA: October 10, 2000; EU: December 1, 2000	Notes: Developed by Argonaut Games.; Published by Fox Interactive.; Based on the 1997 film Alien Resurrection.; Planned ports of this game for the Sega Dreamcast and PC were cancelled.
Aliens: Thanatos Encounter Original release date(s): NA: March 30, 2001; EU: April 13, 2001	Release years by system: 2001—Game Boy Color
Aliens: Thanatos Encounter Original release date(s): NA: March 30, 2001; EU: April 13, 2001	Notes: Developed by Wicked Witch Software and Crawfish Interactive.; Published by THQ.
Aliens versus Predator 2 Original release date(s): EU: October 22, 2001; NA: October 31, 2001	Release years by system: 2001—PC; 2002—Macintosh
Aliens versus Predator 2 Original release date(s): EU: October 22, 2001; NA: October 31, 2001	Notes: Developed by Monolith Productions.; Published for the PC by Fox Interactive and for the Macintosh by MacPlay.; This game is a sequel to Aliens versus Predator (1999).; An expansion pack entitled Aliens versus Predator 2: Primal Hunt was released in 2002.; A planned port of this game for the PlayStation 2 was cancelled.
Aliens versus Predator 2: Primal Hunt Original release date(s): NA: August 13, 2002; EU: August 16, 2002	Release years by system: 2002—PC
Aliens versus Predator 2: Primal Hunt Original release date(s): NA: August 13, 2002; EU: August 16, 2002	Notes: Developed by Third Law Interactive.; Published by Sierra Entertainment.; This game is an expansion pack for Aliens versus Predator 2.
Aliens versus Predator: Extinction Original release date(s): NA: July 30, 2003; EU: August 8, 2003	Release years by system: 2003—PlayStation 2, Xbox
Aliens versus Predator: Extinction Original release date(s): NA: July 30, 2003; EU: August 8, 2003	Notes: Developed by Zono.; Published by Electronic Arts.
Aliens: Unleashed Original release date(s): NA: November 25, 2003	Release years by system: 2003—Mobile phone
Aliens: Unleashed Original release date(s): NA: November 25, 2003	Notes: Developed and published by Sorrent.
Alien vs. Predator Original release date(s): NA: August 19, 2004	Release years by system: 2004—Mobile phone
Alien vs. Predator Original release date(s): NA: August 19, 2004	Notes: Developed by Superscape.; Published by Superscape and 3D Wireless Games.; Based on the 2004 film Alien vs. Predator.
Predator Original release date(s): NA: November 10, 2004	Release years by system: 2004—Mobile phone
Predator Original release date(s): NA: November 10, 2004	Notes: Developed and published by Indiagames.
Alien vs. Predator Original release date(s): NA: November 13, 2004	Release years by system: 2004—Mobile phone
Alien vs. Predator Original release date(s): NA: November 13, 2004	Notes: Developed by Wicked Witch Software.; Published by Elite Systems.; Based on the 2004 film Alien vs. Predator.
Predator: Concrete Jungle Original release date(s): EU: April 15, 2005; NA: April 26, 2005	Release years by system: 2005—PlayStation 2, Xbox
Predator: Concrete Jungle Original release date(s): EU: April 15, 2005; NA: April 26, 2005	Notes: Developed by Eurocom.; Published by Vivendi.
Alien vs. Predator 3D Original release date(s): NA: November, 2005	Release years by system: 2005—Mobile phone
Alien vs. Predator 3D Original release date(s): NA: November, 2005	Notes: Developed and published by Superscape.; Based on the 2004 film Alien vs. Predator.
Aliens: Extermination Original release date(s): NA: October 2006	Release years by system: 2006—Arcade
Aliens: Extermination Original release date(s): NA: October 2006	Notes: Developed by Play Mechanix.; Published by Global VR.
Aliens vs. Predator: Requiem Original release date(s): NA: November 13, 2007; EU: November 30, 2007; AU: December 6, 2007	Release years by system: 2007—PlayStation Portable
Aliens vs. Predator: Requiem Original release date(s): NA: November 13, 2007; EU: November 30, 2007; AU: December 6, 2007	Notes: Developed by Rebellion Developments.; Published by Sierra Entertainment.; Based on the 2007 film Aliens vs. Predator: Requiem.
AVP: PredAlien Builder and Game Original release date(s): NA: 2007	Release years by system: 2007—Online
AVP: PredAlien Builder and Game Original release date(s): NA: 2007	Notes: Based on the 2007 film Aliens vs. Predator: Requiem.; Official Website
AvP: VU Original release date(s): NA: 2007	Release years by system: 2007—Online
AvP: VU Original release date(s): NA: 2007	Notes: Published by 20th Century Fox.; Developed by 20th Century Fox.; Based on the 2007 film Aliens vs. Predator: Requiem.
AVPR: Combat Evolved Original release date(s): NA: 2007	Release years by system: 2007—Online
AVPR: Combat Evolved Original release date(s): NA: 2007	Notes: Developed and published by Gameloft.; Based on the 2007 film Aliens vs. Predator: Requiem.
Alien vs. Predator 2 2D: Requiem Original release date(s): NA: 2007	Release years by system: 2007—Mobile phone
Alien vs. Predator 2 2D: Requiem Original release date(s): NA: 2007	Notes: Developed and published by Superscape.; Based on the 2007 film Aliens vs. Predator: Requiem.; This game is a sequel to Superscape's 2004 Alien vs. Predator title.
CR: Alien vs. Predator Original release date(s): JP: 2007	Release years by system: 2007—Arcade
CR: Alien vs. Predator Original release date(s): JP: 2007	Notes: Developed and published by Cross Media International and Twentieth Century Fox.; Based on the 2004 film Alien vs. Predator.
Predator: The Duel Original release date(s): NA: 2008	Release years by system: 2008—Mobile phone
Predator: The Duel Original release date(s): NA: 2008	Notes: Developed and published by IG Fun.; This game is a sequel to 2004's Predator title for mobile phones.

=== Titles released in the 2010s ===
Game	Details
Aliens vs. Predator Original release date(s): NA: February 16, 2010; AU: February 18, 2010; EU: February 19, 2010	Release years by system: 2010—PC, PlayStation 3, Xbox 360
Aliens vs. Predator Original release date(s): NA: February 16, 2010; AU: February 18, 2010; EU: February 19, 2010	Notes: Developed by Rebellion Developments.; Published by Sega.
Predator or Prey Original release date(s): NA: 2010	Release years by system: 2010—Online
Predator or Prey Original release date(s): NA: 2010	Notes: Published by 20th Century Fox.; Developed by 20th Century Fox.; Based on the 2010 film Predators.
Predators Original release date(s): NA: July 1, 2010	Release years by system: 2010—iPhone, iPod Touch, iPad; 2012—Android
Predators Original release date(s): NA: July 1, 2010	Notes: Published by Chillingo and Fox Digital Entertainment; Developed by Angry Mob Games.; Based on the 2010 film Predators.
Predators Original release date(s): NA: 2010	Release years by system: 2010—Mobile
Predators Original release date(s): NA: 2010	Notes: Published by Gameloft.; Developed by Gameloft.; Based on the 2010 film Predators.
Predators: The Great Hunt Original release date(s): NA: 2010	Release years by system: 2010—Mobile
Predators: The Great Hunt Original release date(s): NA: 2010	Notes: Published by Game in' Action Ltd.; Developed by Game in' Action Ltd.; Based on the 2010 film Predators.
Aliens: Infestation Original release date(s): NA: October 11, 2011; EU: September 30, 2011	Release years by system: 2011—Nintendo DS
Aliens: Infestation Original release date(s): NA: October 11, 2011; EU: September 30, 2011	Notes: Published by Sega.; Developed by WayForward and Gearbox Software.; This is a different game from the fanmade game demo with the same name.
Aliens: Colonial Marines Original release date(s): NA/EU: February 12, 2013	Release years by system: 2013—PC, PlayStation 3, Xbox 360
Aliens: Colonial Marines Original release date(s): NA/EU: February 12, 2013	Notes: Developed by Gearbox Software.; Published by Sega.; Set after the events of Alien 3 (1992).; This is a different game from the cancelled 2002 Aliens: Colonial Marines title developed by Fox Interactive, Check Six Games, and Electronic Arts for the PlayStation 2.; Aliens: Colonial Marines was initially forecast for a 2009 release, but its development was delayed in favor of Aliens vs. Predator.; Versions of the game were planned for the Nintendo DS in 2009, and the Wii U in 2011. The former version was never confirmed to be in development, and the latter version was being developed, but was then further delayed and eventually confirmed as cancelled in April 2013, likely due to the notorious negativity surrounding the game at that point in time.
AVP: Evolution Original release date(s): NA: February 28, 2013	Release years by system: 2013—Android, iPhone, iPod Touch, iPad, Ouya
AVP: Evolution Original release date(s): NA: February 28, 2013	Notes: Published by Fox Digital Entertainment.; Developed by Angry Mob Games.
Aliens: Armageddon Original release date(s): NA: 2014	Release years by system: 2014—Arcade
Aliens: Armageddon Original release date(s): NA: 2014	Notes: Developed by Play Mechanix.; Published by Raw Thrills.; Sequel to Aliens: Extermination (42’’ fixed gun cabinet only).
Alien: Isolation Original release date(s): NA/EU: October 7, 2014	Release years by system: 2014—PC, PlayStation 3, PlayStation 4, Xbox 360, Xbox One; 2019—Nintendo Switch
Alien: Isolation Original release date(s): NA/EU: October 7, 2014	Notes: Developed by The Creative Assembly.; Published by Sega.; Based on the films Alien (1979) and Aliens (1986).
Aliens vs. Pinball Original release date(s): April 26, 2016	Release years by system: 2016—Android, iOS, PC, PlayStation 3, PlayStation 4, PlayStation Vita, Wii U, Xbox 360, Xbox One 2017—Nintendo Switch
Aliens vs. Pinball Original release date(s): April 26, 2016	Notes: Developed by Zen Studios.; Expansion Pack for Zen Pinball 2, Pinball FX 2 and Pinball FX 3; Published by Zen Studios.; Contains 3 tables, based on the films Aliens (1986), and Alien vs. Predator (2004), as well as the 2014 video game Alien: Isolation with original plots.
Alien: Covenant In Utero Original release date(s): NA: May 11, 2017	Release years by system: 2017—Steam
Alien: Covenant In Utero Original release date(s): NA: May 11, 2017	Notes: Produced by FoxNext VR Studio and MPC VR.; Distributed by 20th Century Fox.; Based upon the 2017 film Alien: Covenant.
Alien: Covenant Original release date(s): NA: 2017	Release years by system: 2017—Arcade
Alien: Covenant Original release date(s): NA: 2017	Notes: Developed by Play Mechanix.; Published by Raw Thrills.; Based upon the 2017 film Alien: Covenant.; This game is actually a rebranded version of Aliens: Armageddon.
Alien: Descent Original release date(s): NA: 2018	Release years by system: 2018—VR
Alien: Descent Original release date(s): NA: 2018	Notes: Developed by Pure Imagination Studios.; Published by Pure Imagination Studios.
Alien: Offworld Colony Simulator Original release date(s): NA: 2018	Release years by system: 2018—Amazon Alexa
Alien: Offworld Colony Simulator Original release date(s): NA: 2018	Notes: Developed by 20th Century Fox.; Published by 20th Century Fox.
Predator VR Original release date(s): NA: 2018	Release years by system: 2018—Steam
Predator VR Original release date(s): NA: 2018	Notes: Developed by 20th Century Fox.; Published by 20th Century Fox.
Alien: Blackout Original release date(s): January 24, 2019	Release years by system: 2019—iOS, Android
Alien: Blackout Original release date(s): January 24, 2019	Notes: Developed by FoxNext, D3 Go, Theory Interactive, and Rival Games.; Published by FoxNext, D3 Go, Theory Interactive, and Rival Games.; Narrative sequel to Alien: Isolation.; Removed from Apple and Google app stores in October 2023.

=== Titles released in the 2020s ===
Game	Details
Predator: Hunting Grounds Original release date(s): April 24, 2020	Release years by system: 2020—PlayStation 4, Microsoft Windows
Predator: Hunting Grounds Original release date(s): April 24, 2020	Notes: Developed by IllFonic; Published by Sony Interactive Entertainment
Aliens: Fireteam Elite Original release date(s): August 24, 2021	Release years by system: 2021—PlayStation 4, PlayStation 5, Xbox One, Xbox Series X/S, Microsoft Windows, Nintendo Switch
Aliens: Fireteam Elite Original release date(s): August 24, 2021	Notes: Developed and Published by Cold Iron Studios.
Aliens: Dark Descent Original release date(s): June 20, 2023	Release years by system: 2023—PlayStation 4, PlayStation 5, Microsoft Windows, Xbox One, Xbox Series X/S
Aliens: Dark Descent Original release date(s): June 20, 2023	Notes: Developed by Tindalos Interactive; Published by Focus Entertainment
Alien: Rogue Incursion Original release date(s): December 19, 2024	Release years by system: 2024—VR: Meta Quest 3, PS VR2 and SteamVR 2025—Non VR: PlayStation 5 and Windows (Steam)
Alien: Rogue Incursion Original release date(s): December 19, 2024	Notes: Developed by Survios
Aliens: Fireteam Elite 2 Original release date(s): August 25, 2026	Release years by system: 2026—PlayStation 5, Xbox Series X/S, Microsoft Windows, Nintendo Switch 2
Aliens: Fireteam Elite 2 Original release date(s): August 25, 2026	Notes: Developed by Cold Iron Studios, published by Daybreak Game Company
Alien: Isolation 2 Original release date(s): ?	Release years by system:
Alien: Isolation 2 Original release date(s): ?	Notes: Developed by Creative Assembly

=== Cancelled titles ===
Game	Details
Aliens Interactive / Aliens Interactive CDI Cancellation date: 1991–1993	Proposed system release: 1991–1993—CD-i
Aliens Interactive / Aliens Interactive CDI Cancellation date: 1991–1993	Notes: Developed by Dark Vision Interactive.; Published by Dark Vision Interactive.
Operation: Aliens Cancellation date: 1992	Proposed system release: 1992—LCD game
Operation: Aliens Cancellation date: 1992	Notes: Developed by Tiger Electronics.; Published by Tiger Electronics.; The game was based upon the cancelled animated series Operation: Aliens.
Alien vs Predator Cancellation date: 1994	Proposed system release: 1994—Atari Lynx
Alien vs Predator Cancellation date: 1994	Notes: Developed by Image (company).; Published by Atari Corporation.; This is a different game from other Alien(s) vs. Predator titles by other developers for other gaming platforms.
Alien Resurrection Cancellation date: 2000	Proposed system release: 2000—PC, Dreamcast
Alien Resurrection Cancellation date: 2000	Notes: Developed by Argonaut Games.; Published by Fox Interactive.
Aliens: Colonial Marines Cancellation date: October 11, 2002	Proposed system release: 2002—PlayStation 2
Aliens: Colonial Marines Cancellation date: October 11, 2002	Notes: Developed by Fox Interactive and Check-Six.; Published by Electronic Arts.; Sequel to the 1986 film Aliens.; This is a different game from the 2013 title Aliens: Colonial Marines by Gearbox Software and Sega.
Aliens Versus Predator Cancellation date: 2004	Proposed system release: 2004—Game Boy Advance
Aliens Versus Predator Cancellation date: 2004	Notes: Published by Ubisoft.; Based on the 2004 film Alien vs. Predator.; This is a different game from other Alien(s) vs. Predator titles by other developers for other gaming platforms.
Aliens: Crucible Cancellation date: 2009	Proposed system release: 2009—PC, Xbox 360, PlayStation 3
Aliens: Crucible Cancellation date: 2009	Notes: Developed by Obsidian Entertainment.; Published by Sega.
Aliens: Colonial Marines Cancellation date: 2013	Proposed system release: 2013—Wii U
Aliens: Colonial Marines Cancellation date: 2013	Notes: Developed by Gearbox Software.; Published by Sega.

=== Related titles ===
Game	Details
The Alien Original release date(s): 1982	Release years by system: 1982 – Apple II
The Alien Original release date(s): 1982	Notes: Developed and published by Avalon Hill.; Gameplay and story based on the 1979 film Alien.; This game is not part of the Alien, Predator, or Alien vs. Predator franchises. It is unrelated to the official 1982 and 1984 Alien computer games developed by Fox Video Games, Amsoft, Concept Software, and Argus Press Software Ltd.
Alien Original release date(s): 1982	Release years by system: 1982 – Sinclair ZX81
Alien Original release date(s): 1982	Notes: Published by Personal Software Services.; Gameplay and story based on the 1979 film Alien.; This game is not part of the Alien, Predator, or Alien vs. Predator franchises. It is unrelated to the official 1982 and 1984 Alien computer games developed by Fox Video Games, Amsoft, Concept Software, and Argus Press Software Ltd.
Call of Duty: Ghosts Original release date(s): 2013	Release years by system: 2013 – Microsoft Windows, Xbox One, PlayStation 4, Xbox 360, PlayStation 3
Call of Duty: Ghosts Original release date(s): 2013	Notes: Developed by Infinity Ward.; Released as part of the Devastation DLC.; The Predator is available as a Field Order.; This game is not part of the Alien, Predator, or Alien vs. Predator franchises.
Soldiers Inc. Original release date(s): 2015	Release years by system: 2015 – Facebook
Soldiers Inc. Original release date(s): 2015	Notes: Developed by Plarium.; Alien and Predator are available as playable characters.; This game is not part of the Alien, Predator, or Alien vs. Predator franchises.
Mortal Kombat X Original release date(s): 2015	Release years by system: 2015 – Microsoft Windows, Xbox One, PlayStation 4, iOS, Android
Mortal Kombat X Original release date(s): 2015	Notes: Developed by Netherrealm Studios.; Alien and Predator are available as playable characters.; This game is not part of the Alien, Predator, or Alien vs. Predator franchises.
Dead by Daylight Original release date(s): 2016	Release years by system: 2016 – Microsoft Windows, macOS, Xbox One, Xbox Series X/S, PlayStation 4, PlayStation 5, Nintendo Switch, Android, iOS, Stadia
Dead by Daylight Original release date(s): 2016	Notes: Developed by Behaviour Interactive.; The Xenomorph and Ellen Ripley are available as playable characters, as well as a map based on the Nostromo.; This game is not part of the Alien, Predator, or Alien vs. Predator franchises.
Tom Clancy's Ghost Recon Wildlands Original release date(s): 2017	Release years by system: 2017 – Microsoft Windows, Xbox One, PlayStation 4
Tom Clancy's Ghost Recon Wildlands Original release date(s): 2017	Notes: Developed by Ubisoft Paris.; The Predator is available as an enemy.; This game is not part of the Alien, Predator, or Alien vs. Predator franchises.
Fortnite Battle Royale Original release date(s): 2017	Release years by system: 2017 – Microsoft Windows, macOS, Xbox One, Xbox Series X/S, PlayStation 4, PlayStation 5, Nintendo Switch, Android
Fortnite Battle Royale Original release date(s): 2017	Notes: Developed by Epic Games.; The Predator is available as a playable character in Chapter 2, Season 5 as a secret outfit in the Battle Pass. The Xenomorph and Ellen Ripley are purchasable playable characters.; This game is not part of the Alien, Predator, or Alien vs. Predator franchises.
Fall Guys Original release date(s): 2020	Release years by system: 2020 - Microsoft Windows, PlayStation 4; 2022 - Nintendo Switch, PlayStation 5, Xbox One, Xbox Series X/S; 2024 - Android, iOS (European Union only)
Fall Guys Original release date(s): 2020	Notes: Developed by Mediatonic.; The Xenomorph is available as a costume in the Season 2: Satellite Scramble Season Pass. The Facehugger and Ellen Ripley are purchasable costumes.; This game is not part of the Alien, Predator, or Alien vs. Predator franchises.

== Card games ==
List of card games based on the Alien franchise.
Game	Release year	Designer	Publisher	Notes	Ref.
Aliens Predator Customizable Card Game	1997	Ran Ackels, Paul Brown, David Hewitt, John Myler	Harper Prism, Precedence Publishing	Better known as the "Premiere Edition" set	* Published by Precedence Entertainment and Harper Prism.
Aliens Predator Customizable Card Game: Alien Resurrection Expansion Set	1998	Michael Pease, Hans Rueffert, Sean Curran	Harper Prism, Precedence Publishing	Expansion to Aliens Predator Customizable Card Game (1997)	
Legendary Encounters: An Alien Deck Building Game	2014	Ben Cichoski, Daniel Mandel	Upper Deck Entertainment		
Legendary Encounters: An Alien Deck Building Game Expansion	2016	Ben Cichoski, Daniel Mandel	Upper Deck Entertainment	Expansion to Legendary Encounters: An Alien Deck Building Game (2016)	
Vs System 2PCG: The Alien Battles	2016	Ben Cichoski, Daniel Mandel	Upper Deck Entertainment		

== Board games ==
List of board games based on the Alien franchise.
Game	Release year	Designer	Publisher	Notes	Ref.
Alien	1979	(Uncredited)	Editrice Giochi, Kenner		
Obcy	1988	Artur Górski	Gambit		
Aliens	1989	David McKenzie, Barry Nakazono	Leading Edge Games		
Operation: Aliens	1993	(Uncredited)	Peter Pan Playthings Ltd		
Aliens	2001	Lloyd Krassner	Warp Spawn Games		
Alien Skirmish	2004	Lloyd Krassner	Warp Spawn Games		
Aliens: This Time It's War	2010	Mark Chaplin	(Self-Published)	Unauthorized game	
Aliens vs. Predator: Requiem	2010	N/A	Zvezda		
Alien vs Predator: The Hunt Begins	2015	Jarek Ewertowski, Grzegorz Oleksy	Prodos Games, Ltd		
Alien vs Predator: Alien Warriors Expansion	2015	N/A	Prodos Games, Ltd	Expansion to Alien vs Predator: The Hunt Begins (2015)	
Alien VS Predator: Unleashed	2017	N/A	Prodos Games, Ltd	Expansion to Alien vs Predator: The Hunt Begins (2015)	
Battle Yahtzee: Alien vs. Predator	2016	N/A	USAopoly		
CLUE: Alien vs. Predator	2016	N/A	USAopoly		
Alien VS Predator: Hot Landing Zone	2019	N/A	Prodos Games, Ltd	Expansion to Alien vs Predator: The Hunt Begins (2015)	
Aliens: Another Glorious Day in the Corps	2020	Andrew Haught	Gale Force Nine		
Alien: Fate of the Nostromo	2021	Scott Rogers	Ravensburger		

== Role-playing games ==
List of role-playing games based on the Alien franchise.
Game	Release year	Designer	Publisher	Notes	Ref.
Aliens Adventure Game	1991	David McKenzie, Barry Nakazono	Leading Edge Games		
Aliens: Colonial Marines Technical Manual	1995	Lee Brimmicombe-Wood	Boxtree Publishing		
Mars Patrol	1999	Randal Snyder	(Web published)	Sundered Epochs: Aliens Versus Predator series	
Alien Subversion	2000	Randal Snyder	(Web published)	Sundered Epochs: Aliens Versus Predator series	
The Hunt	2004	Randal Snyder	(Web published)	Sundered Epochs: Aliens Versus Predator series	
Aliens: Game Over	2004	Dan McAllister, Scott Middlebrook, Michael J. Tresca	(Web published)		
Aliens Versus Predator	2009	Randal Snyder	(Web published)		
Christmas on the Moon	2015	Michael Mørk, Anders Troelsen	(Web published)		
Alien: The Roleplaying Game	2019	Tomas Härenstam, Andrew E.C. Gaska	Free League Publishing		

== Miniatures games ==
Game	Details
HorrorClix Original release date(s): 2006	Release years by system: 2006
HorrorClix Original release date(s): 2006	Notes: Published by Wizkids.
