= Shuttlecraft (disambiguation) =

A shuttlecraft is a fictional or theoretical spacecraft, usually capable of atmospheric transport.

Shuttlecraft may also refer to similar vehicles, such as:

- Shuttlecraft (Star Trek), in the Star Trek universe
- Imperial Shuttlecraft, in the Star Wars universe
