= Aliens Versus Predator 2 =

2001 video game

- Developer: Monolith Productions (Note: Mac OS X port developed by The Omni Group.)
- Publishers: Sierra On-Line; Fox Interactive; MacPlay (Mac OS X)
- Producers: David Stalker; William Westwater
- Designer: William Westwater
- Programmers: Kevin Stephens; Andrew Mattingly
- Artist: Kevin Kilstrom
- Composer: Nathan Grigg
- Engine: Lithtech Talon
- Platforms: Windows; Mac OS X
- Release: Windows: EU: October 22, 2001; UK: November 2001; Mac OS X: NA: July 23, 2003
- Genre: First-person shooter
- Modes: Single-player, multiplayer

Aliens Versus Predator 2 is a science fiction first-person shooter video game developed by Monolith Productions and co-published by Fox Interactive and Sierra On-Line for Microsoft Windows in October 2001, and for Mac OS X in July 2003. The game is a sequel to Aliens Versus Predator (1999); both games are based on the characters of the Alien and Predator media franchises as well as the Alien vs. Predator crossover series. It is set on the fictional planet LV-1201, which houses a vast series of ruins infested with Aliens that is routinely visited by a clan of Predators who hunt the creatures for sport.

The game is played from a first-person perspective. In the single-player mode, players control one of three characters, each with their own abilities and individual story modes. An online multiplayer mode, which allows players to play as one of four teams in competitive modes, is no longer officially supported and requires a community developed patch to enable multiplayer.

An expansion pack titled Aliens Versus Predator 2: Primal Hunt was released in 2002. A Gold Edition of Aliens Versus Predator 2 followed, combining both the original game and the expansion pack into a single package. There were never any plans for a sequel, but in 2010, Rebellion Developments made a reboot simply titled Aliens vs. Predator.

== Gameplay ==
Like its predecessor, Aliens Versus Predator 2 allows the player to choose one of three characters: an Alien, Predator, or human Colonial Marine. Each character has different objectives, abilities and weapons at their disposal. The single-player campaigns present the player with a conventional series of levels that are designed around the abilities of each species.

As an Alien the player can explore most of the game's environments freely, even climbing across walls and ceilings. However, the Alien has no weapons and must use its claws, tail, and jaws to attack enemies. The player can detect pheromones to discern human or Predator enemies. The Alien can drop from any height without injury and is the fastest of the three player characters.

When playing as the Predator, the player uses a variety of weapons from the Predator films such as wrist blades, a throwing disc, and shoulder-mounted energy weapons. The Predator is more durable than the human or the Alien and can survive falls from greater heights than the human. It can use a cloaking device to become invisible and several different modes of vision to help in the detection of enemies, including infrared vision and a mode sensitive to electrical systems. Unlike in the previous game, the Predator in Aliens Versus Predator 2 recharges its energy supply using a personal item.

As the Colonial Marine, the player uses a number of weapons to combat Aliens and Predators. The Marine wears armor for protection, and uses an image intensifier, flashlight, and flares to improve visibility in dark areas.

=== Multiplayer ===
Aliens Versus Predator 2 has several multiplayer modes which can be played through an internet or local area network connection. In each game the player chooses one of four teams to play as: The Aliens, Predators, Marines, or corporate mercenaries (called "Iron Bears" in the game's storyline). Each team has unique abilities, advantages, and disadvantages. The Aliens are able to scale walls and ceilings and the Predators can become invisible, while the two human teams have a large array of heavy weapons as well as motion trackers.

There are six different multiplayer "modes" played on a number of "maps". "Deathmatch" mode is a free-for-all match in which the player's goal is to accumulate the highest number of kills. "Team Deathmatch" has the same goal except that the player is teamed with other players of the same species (or faction, in the case of the Colonial Marines and the Corporate Mercenaries). In "Hunt" there are two teams, one designated as the "hunter" and the other as the "prey"; the hunters accumulate points by killing the prey, while the prey can themselves become hunters by killing members of the hunter team. "Survivor" mode designates all players as "defenders" at the start; if a player is killed they become a "mutant" and can then earn points by killing defenders. Defenders gain points by staying alive without becoming mutants. "Overrun" is a timed match between two teams that is similar to "Survivor" except that each player has a finite number of lives; at the end of the round points are awarded based on the number of surviving members on each team. "Evacuation" is another two-team match with a finite number of lives, in which one team is designated as the "attackers" and the other as "defenders". The attacking team wins by killing all of the defenders, while the defending team wins by locating the map's evacuation point and having at least one member survive within it for ten seconds.

In November 2008, Sierra Entertainment shut down multiplayer functionality for the game. In 2008, a community project titled the Master Server Patch was launched that allowed players to modify the game to restore multiplayer functionality.

== Synopsis ==
=== Setting ===
The story of Aliens Versus Predator 2 largely takes place in the year 2231, approximately 52 years after the events of both Aliens and Alien 3. Humanity has established an outpost on the planet LV-1201. The research colony consisted of two major installations: the Primary Operations Complex (POC), designed with the same "shake and bake" architecture seen at Hadley's Hope in Aliens; and the Forward Observation Pods, a set of four (originally five) scientific research facilities suspended over a canyon by a network of trellises, with an internal design style reminiscent of the Nostromo from Alien. A garrison of corporate mercenaries known as the Iron Bears, led by the mercenary general Vassili Rykov, provides security while Dr. Eisenberg runs the science division.

The plot revolves around "The Incident", an event which occurred shortly after 5:18 AM, on November 25, 2230, in which a fight between a Xenomorph (the player character in the game's Alien storyline) and a Predator resulted in the Predator activating its self-destruct device, causing massive damage to the Primary Operations Complex and allowing it to be overrun with Xenomorphs. Since the POC was the communications link between the Forward Observation Pods and the rest of the galaxy, this leaves the survivors at the Pods stranded and unable to call for help. Six weeks later, the Colonial Marines are sent to investigate what happened. Different parts of each campaign take place anywhere from 1 day and 7 hours before The Incident to more than six weeks after.

It is later established in the expansion pack Primal Hunt that LV-1201 was also once the location of a Predator hunting ground, where the Predators hunt Xenomorphs for sport. In Primal Hunt, a lone Predator survivor from a previous botched hunt unwittingly caused a Xenomorph outbreak in Pod 5 while trying to alert other members of its kind to its location. The Iron Bears were forced to destroy Pod 5, while a lone Predator ship intercepted the call. The Alien storyline, which is the earliest point in the main game, picks up about five weeks after this catastrophe occurred.

=== Plot ===
The three story lines in Aliens Versus Predator 2 intersect and impact one another, unlike the preceding game.

==== Alien ====
From October 15, 2221 to some time in early 2222, "Expedition One" was tasked with studying a then-dormant alien hive on LV-1201. The Hive "woke up" on or immediately prior to New Year's Eve, resulting in mass casualties. The only survivor was Dr. Eisenberg, who was rescued from Observation Post 4 but left traumatized by the experience; there are hints that he ate some of the other expedition members.

At 10:13 PM on November 23, 2230, one day and 7 hours before the Incident, Dr. Eisenberg is discussing some of the facility's problems with a fellow Weyland-Yutani employee. Meanwhile, a shipping crate hiding a Xenomorph egg is delivered to the colony, where an accident awakens the egg and releases the Facehugger. The Facehugger leaves the ship and begins to track an irritable guard through the POC. When the guard retires to his quarters for a nap, the Facehugger springs on him and infects him.

In due time, a player-controlled chestburster hatches. It flees through an open window and proceeds through the POC until it feeds on a captive cat. After feeding on the cat, the chestburster grows into a full Alien drone.

In the early hours of November 25, the alien fights its way through the POC, releasing other Xenomorphs being kept as test subjects along the way. It reaches the lower levels, finally encountering a Predator. It fatally wounds the Predator, which activates its Self-Destruct Device, severely damaging the circulation and waste flow systems and creating a breach that facilitates the Xenomorph invasion into the POC. This invasion prompts the U.S.S. Verloc's deployment.

Six weeks later, the alien infiltrates the Pods during a brief security failure caused by Corporal Harrison. As the Xenomorphs attack the Pods, they weaken the defenses and release an artificial hive in the process.

Eisenberg has taken advantage of the Marines' arrival to initiate the Large Mass Specimen Extraction, AKA Operation Savior, a project to capture the Xenomorph Empress. As part of the plan, combat synthetics have wired explosive charges throughout the tunnels of the Hive. After leaving the Pods and armed with this information, the alien disables these explosives as it tracks the Empress.

The Empress is successfully captured, but the alien pursues her captors, including Eisenberg himself. It tracks them through an archaeological site, killing numerous guards, civilians, and Iron Bears mercenaries, to a dropship landing pad. It kills two Predators and sabotages the pad's support machinery, causing the dropship to crash. Furious, Eisenberg attacks the alien directly. The alien incapacitates Eisenberg, who is later "cocooned". The final scene reveals that Eisenberg now has a synthetic body; notes in the Marine and Predator campaigns hint that his father was involved in prosthetics research that allowed Eisenberg to replace some or all of his body at the cost of radical personality changes.

==== Marine ====
In January 2231, on board the USS Verloc, the ship is carrying a small contingent of the U.S.C.M (United States Colonial Marines) to planet LV-1201. Contact has been lost with the research facility on the planet, and the Verloc is the closest ship, but is also significantly undermanned, having lost eight marines and one android in a recent operation. Therefore, their orders are to search for survivors, fortify, and wait for reinforcements to arrive.

At 5:25 AM, two dropships are deployed to the Primary Operations Complex, but they are separated by hurricane winds and the one carrying Harrison (the player character) and Major McCain is damaged and forced to make an emergency landing outside the POC. Red Team and Sergeant Hall are ordered to restore the main power core, White Team is ordered to locate security control, and "Blackwell's boys" (Blackwell, Shugi, and Harrison) are ordered to head to the East Landing Bay. Harrison takes point but a structural collapse blocks Blackwell and Shugi from following him, and disables his radio transmitter, allowing him to hear but not talk to the rest of the marines. Harrison manages to reset the generator in the East Landing Bay and reactivate the beacon there on his own, and McCain's dropship immediately lands there. After reuniting with his team, Harrison is then sent to the nearest security office to activate the POC's automated defense grid. He succeeds, but accidentally wakes up the POC's alien inhabitants in the process. McCain's dropship departs without Harrison, who is ordered to rendezvous with Hall's team, which he does by commandeering an APC. Once reunited with what is left of Hall's team, he is informed that Hall has been taken by the aliens. Most of the team gets inside the APC and stays there while Harrison attempts to rescue Hall on foot, but by the time he finds her, she has already been impregnated with a Chestburster. She dies as Harrison finds her. He then returns to the APC, and depart in it to reunite with the rest of the marines at the Southern Landing, which has been secured by White Team.

At 6:55 AM, the marines attempt to reach the Pods via the tunnel network connecting them to the POC, but the doors are locked. They can only be opened from the inside, and only one at a time, like an airlock. Harrison is sent ahead to open the doors so the marines' APCs can proceed through. Upon reaching tunnel section 4, Harrison is able to shut down the primary control terminal, allowing "Mother" (presumably the Verloc's computer) to disable tunnel security entirely. However, due to unique modifications made to the security protocols, this also temporarily disables all security measures and defenses at the Forward Observation Pods. During this time, Aliens attack the Pods and six of the Iron Bears are killed before the marines manage to arrive at the Pods.

Harrison attempts to establish a communication link with the Verloc. In the process, he begins receiving a message about dead scientists, but it is cut short by a computer error. He is then knocked unconscious by one of the Iron Bears, dressed in a convict's uniform (the pods and POC had both been using convict laborers), put in a prison cell, and declared dead. Harrison's cellmate gets into a fight with a guard, enabling Harrison to escape his cell. As he wanders around the forward observation pods, he releases the Predator player character from stasis, and then is contacted by a scrambled voice offering to reunite him with his team if he retrieves a "package". The voice guides him to the implantation lab, where the "package" is revealed to be a CD. The voice then guides him from Pod 2 to 4, and from Pod 4 to 3, which has an elevator down to the canyon floor. On the way down, the voice-scrambling software malfunctions and Harrison is surprised that the voice is female. The voice explains to him that his team (Red Team?) appears to be headed to an alien hive, but Harrison cannot get to them on his own because the tunnels have been sealed. Harrison decides to head back to the POC and reunite with White Team to get their help with rescuing the other marines.

On the drive from the forward pods to the POC, the voice explains that her name is Tomiko, and that the retrieved disc contains proof that her brother, Kenji, was murdered while working on LV-1201.

Harrison finds several members of White Team, but they are all killed by Xenomorphs and Predators before Harrison can activate the landing beacon for an incoming dropship. Harrison manages to kill a Predator himself before reaching the dropship. Tomiko transmits the coordinates of an old entry site to the Hive, and Harrison, now in his own Exosuit, proceeds after his fellow marines whom Rykov has stranded. Harrison's Exosuit is damaged during a fall, and he must proceed the rest of the way on foot. He locates his team in a massive chamber where the fossilized remains of a Space Jockey reside. A Xenomorph "Empress" attacks the squad, but Harrison is able to repel the Empress so that he and the rest of the marines can escape via dropship. The Empress tries to stop them, but the dropship bombards her with missiles, killing her.

As the dropship puts distance between itself and the Hive, Tomiko overloads the fusion reactors in the Pods, destroying them and killing herself to save the marines. When the marines return to the Verloc, Major McCain recommends abandoning any further rescue or salvage attempts on LV-1201, as they depart back to Earth.

==== Predator ====
On the night of July 3, 2211, a Weyland-Yutani research facility on the planet Korari came under attack by at least one Predator. A young Rykov, who was a Marine at the time, was among the survivors, but suffered a major injury to his back; he was honorably discharged from the Marines and began working as a mercenary shortly thereafter.

By November 2230, several predators have arrived at LV-1201; their arrival is brought to the attention of Rykov himself, who is now providing private security for the Weyland-Yutani installation there. The hunt lasts for at least a week, during which time one Predator self-destructs after losing in combat to an Alien ("the Incident") and two more are captured by the Iron Bears. Pursuing his captured clan-mates into the Forward Observation Pods, the player character eventually succumbs to electro-magnetic pulse grenades which render his equipment useless and result in his capture.

Rykov places the Predator in a lab where it remains in stasis for over five weeks. It is revealed that this Predator is responsible for Rykov's injuries and his burning desire for revenge. Saved from being impregnated with a Xenomorph and inadvertently released by Corporal Harrison, the Predator powers through a horde of humans, reclaims his equipment and sets off in pursuit of General Rykov.

After escaping aboard a corporate dropship, the Predator fights through the Alien infested caves and tunnels beneath the pods and eventually manages to signal his clan using human technology to broadcast the signal to them. The Predator clan promptly arrive and re-arm the Predator, who then sets off to finish Rykov.

Following Rykov, now encased in an Exosuit, deep into the Xenomorph Hive, the Predator fights his way into the heart of the Hive for a climactic battle with General Rykov. Overcoming his enemy, the Predator rips through Rykov's body, and claims his spine as his trophy after 19 years of chase. The Predator reunites with his clan and departs the planet in order to pursue the U.S.S. Verloc.

== Development ==
The game was developed in 20 months by the core development team.

== Reception ==
Reception

Aggregate score
Aggregator	Score
Metacritic	85/100

Review scores
Publication	Score
AllGame	4.5/5
Computer Gaming World	4.5/5
Eurogamer	6/10
Game Informer	9.25/10
GamePro	4.5/5
GameRevolution	B+
GameSpot	8.7/10
GameSpy	78%
GameZone	9/10
IGN	8.2/10
PC Gamer (US)	86%
X-Play	4/5

The game received "favorable" reviews according to the review aggregation website Metacritic.

During the 5th Annual Interactive Achievement Awards, the Academy of Interactive Arts & Sciences nominated Aliens vs. Predator 2 for the "PC Action/Adventure" and "Online Gameplay" awards; however, it lost in both categories to Return to Castle Wolfenstein. Similarly, the editors of Computer Games Magazine nominated Aliens Versus Predator 2 as the best action game of 2001, but ultimately gave the award to Operation Flashpoint: Cold War Crisis.

== Aliens Versus Predator 2: Primal Hunt ==

An expansion pack, titled Aliens Versus Predator 2: Primal Hunt, was developed by Third Law Interactive, published by Sierra Entertainment and distributed by Fox Interactive in August 2002. It was also included in the Gold Edition of Aliens Versus Predator 2 released in May 2003, which bundled the original game and the expansion pack into a single package. Primal Hunt adds new weapons and multiplayer maps to the original game, as well as a single-player campaign set during the storyline of Aliens Versus Predator 2.

=== Gameplay ===
The player is once again able to play as either a human, Alien, or Predator character, each with its own campaign and abilities. The plot lines of the three characters intersect with the events of the original game.

=== Plot ===
The events of Primal Hunt are set on LV-1201, the same setting as the main game, but take place in different time periods. The stories of the Alien and Predator characters begin five hundred years before the events of Aliens Versus Predator 2 and continue in the year 2230. The human campaign begins in September 2230. Primal Hunt revisits the Forward Observation Pods of the research facility and explains the destruction of Pod 5.

==== Corporate ====
Major Dunya, a female member of the Weyland-Yutani private military company known as the "Iron Bears", is stationed on LV-1201. She is ordered by her superior officer, General Rykov, to retrieve an artifact from a location known as the "Zeta Site" which houses part of a Xenomorph hive as well as technology from both the Space Jockeys and the Predators. The player battles xenomorphs through the Zeta Site, retrieves the artifact, and returns to find that Aliens have infiltrated Pod 5. A Predator steals the artifact and the player defends the cargo area from Aliens until the pod is evacuated. Rykov then destroys the pod's supports, sending it crashing into the valley floor below.

==== Predator ====
In the early 18th century (in Earth time), 500 years before the incident, a Predator spacecraft encounters the planet LV-1201 for the first time and the player Predator is sent there to hunt. The player battles numerous creatures before discovering that Xenomorphs also inhabit the planet. The player tracks the Aliens to their hive and activates an artifact which has the power to repel the Aliens. The game then shifts forward eight months, by which time the Predators have established a camp around the artifact. The player Predator descends into the hive in search of the Alien queen, but the artifact is deactivated and the camp is overrun by Aliens. While repairing a stasis field around a group of Alien eggs, the Predator is attacked by a facehugger and the two are caught in the field and trapped in stasis for five hundred years.

The Predator awakens when Dunya deactivates the artifact, and the player tracks her to the research facility's Forward Observation Pods and breaks into Pod 5, inadvertently allowing the Aliens into the pod. The player retrieves the artifact and sends a signal to other Predators who are nine weeks away. The Predator is then killed by the Alien embryo bursting through its ribcage.

==== Predalien ====
The Predalien character's story also begins 500 years before the incident, but after the Predators have established a presence at Zeta Site. The player begins by controlling a facehugger, exploring the Alien hive and Predator camp in search of a host. The facehugger attacks the Predator, but both become trapped in the stasis field. The game then shifts forward five hundred years to the chestburster emerging from the Predator inside Pod 5. The creature is an Alien/Predator hybrid, called the "Predalien" in the game, and the player controls it and searches for food until it grows into an adult. The player then battles human guards in search of the artifact, but is interrupted when Rykov destroys the pod's supports. The player must then battle several android guards in armored exosuits in order to escape the pod with other Aliens before it falls into the valley below.

=== Reception ===
Reception

Aggregate score
Aggregator	Score
Metacritic	55/100

Review scores
Publication	Score
Computer Gaming World	2.5/5
Game Informer	8/10
GameSpot	5.5/10
GameSpy	2/5
GameZone	7.3/10
IGN	6/10
PC Gamer (US)	68%
X-Play	2/5

The expansion pack received more mixed reviews than the original AvP2, and has a score of 55 according to Metacritic. GameSpot cited it as "being boring", "repetitive", and "giving no sense of direction as the face-hugger". Echoing this, IGN concluded that the title was "[boring], stale, frustrating and plain, Primal Hunt tarnishes the good AvP name".

== See also ==
- List of Alien, Predator, and Alien vs. Predator games
