= Alien vs. Predator =

Science fiction action horror franchise

- Created by: Randy Stradley; Chris Warner
- Original work: Alien vs. Predator: The Machiko Noguchi Saga (1989)
- Owner: 20th Century Studios
- Years: 1989–present
- Based on: Alien by; Dan O'Bannon; Ronald Shusett; Predator by; Jim Thomas; John Thomas

Print publications
- Books: List of books
- Novels: List of novels
- Comics: List of comics

Films and television
- Films: Alien vs. Predator (2004); Aliens vs. Predator: Requiem (2007)

Games
- Traditional: List of board games
- Video games: List of video games

Audio
- Soundtracks: Alien vs. Predator (2004); Aliens vs. Predator: Requiem (2007)

Miscellaneous
- Toys: List of action figures
- Theme park attractions: List of theme park attractions
- Pinball: List of pinball
- Character(s): List of characters

Alien vs. Predator (also known as Aliens versus Predator and AVP) is a science fiction action horror media franchise created by comic book writers Randy Stradley and Chris Warner. The series is a crossover between, and part of, the larger Alien and Predator franchises, depicting the two species—Xenomorph (Alien) and Yautja (Predator)—as being in conflict with one another.

It began as a comic book series in 1989, before being adapted into a video game series in the 1990s. Produced and distributed by 20th Century Fox, the film series began with Alien vs. Predator (2004), directed by Paul W. S. Anderson, and was followed by Aliens vs. Predator: Requiem (2007), directed by the Brothers Strause, and the development of a third film has been delayed indefinitely. The series has led to numerous novels, comics, and video game spin-offs such as Aliens vs. Predator (2010).

== Premise ==
The Alien vs. Predator franchise depicts a series of deadly encounters between humanity and other extraterrestrial species: the Xenomorphs, ferocious, endoparasitoid creatures; and the Yautjas, technologically advanced warriors that hunt for personal sport, honor, and to colonize planets. Predominantly transpiring in the present day of the 21st century (with both films taking place in 2004, and the second film taking place immediately after the first), the series acts as a spin-off and prequel to the Alien franchise portraying humankind's encounters with alien species and life forms, and how they helped shape human civilization, technology and weaponry such as the Colonial Marines, the United Americas, the Nostromo, and those involved with the Weyland-Yutani Corporation that is seen in the Alien franchise of the future.

Throughout the series, audiences see the involvement of the forerunners of the Weyland-Yutani Corporation in the history of these alien creatures as Weyland Industries, headed by Charles Bishop Weyland (one of the many within the Weyland family), who seeks immortality and the advancement of the company, whereas the Yutani Corporation, headed by Ms. Cullen Yutani, seeks to study creatures from space and acquire their technology and weaponry for organized warfare. Amidst the actions of the two corporations, human characters are forced to survive infestations of Xenomorphs and clashes with Yautjas, leading to the future merger between the two companies and the development of interstellar travel and eventually wars with different races from space and other advanced technologies. This also leads to the future events of the Alien franchise.

== Background ==
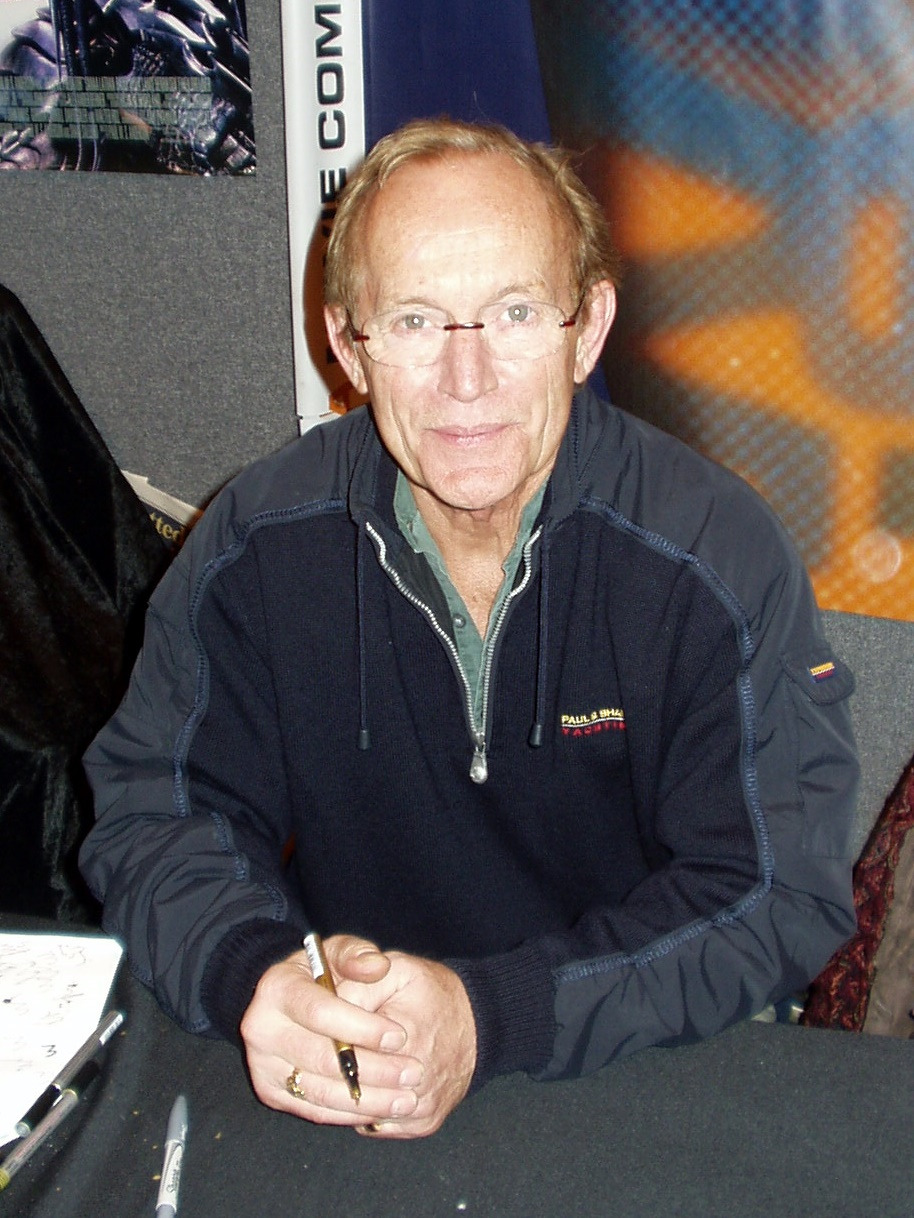
Lance Henriksen was the first to be cast in Alien vs. Predator, as Anderson wanted to keep continuity with the Alien series.

The first Alien vs. Predator story was published by Dark Horse Comics in Dark Horse Presents #34–36 (November 1989 – February 1990), leading to the popular The Machiko Noguchi Saga, following a woman who joins the hunt of the Predators (Yautja). In November 1990, Predator 2 was released in theaters and included a scene depicting an Alien (Xenomorph) skull as one of the Predator's trophies. Over the coming years, Fox had been pursuing a cinematic adaptation of the concept to advance the Alien and Predator franchises further, and Peter Briggs was tasked with the job to write an early script for the project and eventually pitched an idea titled The Hunt: Alien vs. Predator in 1994. However, the pitch was rejected and development of the film remained stuck in development hell for almost a decade before the first feature film was released in 2004 under the helm of Paul W. S. Anderson, titled Alien vs. Predator, with a sequel by the Brothers Strause, titled Aliens vs. Predator: Requiem, eventually released in 2007. Ellen Ripley does not appear in this franchise, as it takes place more than a century prior to the events of the Alien series.

The first actor to be cast for Alien vs. Predator was Lance Henriksen, who played the characters Bishop and Michael Bishop Weyland in Aliens and Alien 3 (and Aliens: Colonial Marines). Although the Alien films are set 150 years in the future, Anderson wanted to keep continuity and a shared universe with the series by including a familiar actor. Henriksen plays billionaire and self-taught-engineer Charles Bishop Weyland, a character which ties in with the Weyland-Yutani Corporation as the original founder and CEO of Weyland Industries. Henriksen later returned to the franchise through the role of Karl Bishop Weyland, a descendant of Charles Weyland, in the 2010 video game Aliens vs. Predator.

According to Anderson, Weyland becomes known for the discovery of the pyramid, and as a result, the Weyland-Yutani Corporation models the Bishop android in the Alien films after him; "when the Bishop android is created in 150 years time, it's created with the face of the creator. It's kind of like Microsoft building an android in 100 years time that has the face of Bill Gates." The Brothers Strause also mentioned how the ending of their sequel built further upon establishing the future of the universe by having the Predator technology acquired by Yutani Corporation (and by extension, OWLF, and Project Stargazer of the Predator films) act as the impetus for the development of advanced technologies such as FTL (faster-than-light travel) drives fitted aboard spaceships.

Furthermore, the 2018 film titled The Predator featured several references to Alien vs. Predator like the shurikens, mask designs, and Alexa's spear which the Predator named Scar made out of an Alien tail. An alternate ending for The Predator displaying a Weyland-Yutani Corp pod containing Ripley and Newt from Aliens (both played by Breanna Watkins) wearing a Weyland-Yutani breathing apparatus shaped like a Xenomorph Facehugger was also intended to further connect to the Alien saga.

== Films ==
Film	U.S. release date	Director(s)	Screenwriter	Story by	Producers
Alien vs. Predator	August 13, 2004	Paul W. S. Anderson	Paul W. S. Anderson	Paul W. S. Anderson, Dan O'Bannon & Ronald Shusett	John Davis, Gordon Carroll, David Giler and Walter Hill
Aliens vs. Predator: Requiem	December 25, 2007	Greg and Colin Strause	Shane Salerno	Shane Salerno	John Davis, David Giler and Walter Hill

=== Alien vs. Predator (2004) ===
In 2004, a Predator mothership arrives in Earth's orbit to draw humans to an ancient Predator training ground on Bouvetøya, an island about one thousand miles north of Antarctica. A buried pyramid giving off a "heat bloom" attracts a group of explorers led by billionaire and self-taught engineer Charles Bishop Weyland (Lance Henriksen), the original founder and CEO of Weyland Industries, who unknowingly activates an Alien egg production line as a hibernating Alien Queen is awakened within the pyramid. Three Predators descend on the planet and enter the structure, killing all humans in their way with the intention of hunting the newly formed Aliens, while the scattered explorers are captured alive by Aliens and implanted with embryos. Two Predators die in the ensuing battle with an Alien, whereas the third allies itself with the lone surviving human, Alexa "Lex" Woods (Sanaa Lathan), while making their way out of the pyramid as it is destroyed by the Predator's wrist bomb and eventually does battle with the escaped Alien Queen on the surface. The Queen is defeated by being dragged down by a water tower into the dark depths of the frozen sea, but not before she fatally wounds the last Predator. The orbiting Predator mothership uncloaks and the crew retrieves the fallen Predator. A Predator elder gives Lex a spear as a sign of respect, and then departs. Once in orbit, it is revealed that an Alien Chestburster was present within the corpse, thus a Predalien hybrid is born.

=== Aliens vs. Predator: Requiem (2007) ===
Set immediately after the events of the previous film, the Predalien hybrid aboard the Predator scout ship, having just separated from the mothership, has grown to full adult size and goes about killing the Predators aboard the ship, causing it to crash in the small town of Gunnison, Colorado. The last surviving Predator activates a distress beacon containing a video recording of the Predalien, which is received by a veteran Predator on the Predator homeworld, who sets off towards Earth to "clean up" the infestation. When it arrives, the Predator tracks the Aliens into a section of the sewer below the town. He removes evidence of their presence as he moves along using a corrosive blue liquid and uses a laser net to try to contain the creatures, but the Aliens still manage to escape into the town above. The Predator fashions a plasma pistol from its remaining plasma caster and hunts Aliens all across town, accidentally cutting the power to the town in the process. During a confrontation with human survivors, the Predator loses its plasma pistol. The Predator then fights the Predalien singlehandedly, and the two mortally wound one another just as the US air force drops a tactical nuclear bomb on the town, incinerating both combatants along with the Predalien's warriors and hive, as well as the few remaining humans in the town. The salvaged plasma pistol is then taken to Ms. Cullen Yutani of the Yutani Corporation, foreshadowing an advancement in technology leading to the future events of the Alien films.

=== Future ===
Colin and Greg Strause were adamant that they wanted to develop Alien vs. Predator 3 during the production of Aliens vs. Predator: Requiem. They essentially sought to make an AVP-film in space and set in the future, but by the time they were hired, 20th Century Fox had already decided to go with Salerno's script set on Earth. They incorporated elements of their ideas into the second film, like the Predator home planet. In 2008, "an anonymous source over at 20th Century Fox got in touch with us over the weekend to relay the news another Aliens vs. Predator sequel is a 'certainty' at this point. If you recall, the brothers Strause – who helmed the Christmas release Aliens vs. Predator: Requiem – stated Fox was going to take a 'wait-and-see' approach to a third chapter, furthermore, that the story would have to continue in space."

On October 28, 2010, io9 published an exclusive interview with the Brothers Strause in which they revealed that Alien vs. Predator 3 would have led directly into Alien. Greg Strause stated, "The original ending for AVPR, that we pitched them, ended up on the Alien homeward [sic], and actually going from the Predator gun, that you see at the end, it was going to transition from that gun to a logo of a Weyland-Yutani spaceship that was heading to an alien planet. And then we were actually going to cut down to the surface [of the alien planet] and you were going to see a hunt going on. It was going to be a whole tribe of predators going against this creature that we called "King Alien." It's this huge giant winged alien thing. And that was going to be the lead-in, to show that the fact that the Predator gun [at the end of AVPR] is the impetus of all the technological advancements that allowed humans to travel in space. Which leads up to the Alien timeline."

When asked about the ending sequence of Aliens vs. Predator: Requiem, which the Predator-weapon handed to Ms. Yutani would lead to humans developing advanced space travel technology, Greg stated, "That was the idea. They never got any of the equipment from the first Predators. It's the first time they ever received any intact working technology left over. So they could take that and reverse engineer, figure out what the power source was – all of those things. And in theory, that would enable that company [Weyland-Yutani] to make massive advancements in technology and dominate the space industry. That was the whole idea, was to literally continue from Ms. Yutani getting the gun – and then cut to 50 years in the future, and there's spaceships now. We've made a quantum leap in space travel. That was going to set up the ending, which would then set up what AVP was going to be, which would take place 100 years in the future. That was kind of the plan."

Liam O'Donnell, who worked as a visual effects consultant on Requiem, wrote a script treatment for AVP3 during the production of Requiem which was set in South Africa about fifty years in the future when global warming had melted the ice caps (and releasing the Alien Queen from Antarctica), featuring the merger and global rule of the Weyland-Yutani Corporation and their development of interstellar travel based on the recovered Predator technology from Gunnison.

In 2015, having worked on the special effects of Aliens vs. Predator: Requiem, VFX make-up artist David Woodruff (the son of Tom Woodruff who worked on both the Alien and Terminator franchises) participated in an interview with TheTerminatorFans, and when asked about the situation of a third chapter in the AVP-trilogy, he stated, "I haven't heard anything about a 3rd installment, not even rumors. This Neill Blomkamp project is the first possibility I've seen or heard of another Alien film and I'm all about it. I know the guys at Amalgamated Dynamics are pushing for something like this too. It's time."

In 2015, during the London Film and Comic Con, Sigourney Weaver said she asked to have Ripley killed in Alien 3 because she knew that Fox were moving forward with Alien vs. Predator. Peter Briggs (writer of The Hunt: Alien vs. Predator) responded by praising all films in the franchise and pointing out that the AVP-films were more successful than Weaver's last two Alien-films. He noted that "There's a terrific Alien vs. Predator movie still to be made by someone. It just hasn't happened yet."

In mid-2018, Shane Black, the director of The Predator, tweeted his belief that a third Alien vs. Predator can still happen, indicating the studio's interest in both franchises. A ComicBookRumours.com article from July suggested Fox may attempt an "AVP Cinematic Universe" after Ridley Scott finishes making the Alien prequels. Fox considered a "soft reboot" to the Alien series with new/original characters, a new setting, and new timeline, which the article also suggested, if it were to happen, could potentially take place within the same continuity as the Predator films and AVP films. Noting Predators featured a Xenomorph skull cameo (along with other references to Aliens) and Lex Woods' Xenomorph tail spear from Alien vs. Predator make an appearance in The Predator. Alternate endings produced for The Predator displaying a Weyland-Yutani Corp pod containing Ripley and Newt (both played by Breanna Watkins) wearing a Weyland-Yutani breathing apparatus shaped like a Xenomorph Facehugger was also intended to further connect to the Alien films. In 2020, Alex Litvak, the co-writer of Predators revealed the original script for the film's cancelled sequel, which would feature the Colonial Marines from Aliens.

In August 2024, Fede Álvarez, the director of Alien: Romulus, also said he was open to directing a third Alien vs. Predator film, proposing to Melanie Brooks and Anthony D'Alessandro of Deadline Hollywood that he would enjoy directing it along with Dan Trachtenberg, the director of the Predator films Prey (2022), Predator: Killer of Killers (2025) and Predator: Badlands (2025): "Maybe it's something I have to co-direct with my buddy Dan. Maybe we should do like [Quentin] Tarantino and Robert Rodriguez did with [From] Dusk till Dawn. I'll direct a half, and he'll direct another half." In October of the same year, Steve Abell (President of Fox Studios) stated that the studio has plans to eventually develop an Alien and Predator crossover film. The Weyland-Yutani Corporation featured in the Alien franchise along with their particular android model included in Alien: Romulus appears in the 2025 film Predator: Badlands as a stepping stone towards a third Alien vs. Predator film. In April 2025, journalist Jeff Sneider reported that there is a Predator included in the script for the Romulus sequel, which would mark another step towards laying the groundwork for a third crossover film. In October 2025, Trachtenberg stated in an interview with IGN that Predator: Badlands is set in the furthest future after the events of all the previous Alien and Alien vs. Predator films and the Alien: Earth TV-series so as to avoid any potential continuity conflicts, considering Romulus and Earth were still in production when Badlands was being produced.

== Unreleased animated series ==
=== Aliens vs. Predator: Annihilation ===
In May 2023, Alien Day founder Josh Izzo revealed that "10 episodes of a fully completed Alien vs. Predator anime series" exist at 20th Century Fox, intended for a Netflix release prior to its acquisition by Disney. The series was to be titled Aliens vs. Predator: Annihilation. It was produced by Eric Calderon and Dave Baker, and directed by Shinji Aramaki. It is, as of 2025, unreleased. Originally developed as an adaptation of Dark Horse Comics' The Machiko Noguchi Saga, with Izzio using the comic as the basis for storyboards in his pitch, the series was redeveloped by Aramaki as a "deep future"-set story set years after the events of Alien Resurrection, told from the perspective of a Yautja clan (including a cyborg and a bone-weapon-wielding warrior named "Bone") as they hunt down xenomorphs.

== Cast and crew ==
=== Principal cast ===
Key
- A ^{V} indicates the actor or actress lent only his or her voice for his or her film character.
- A ^{C} indicates a cameo appearance.
- A dark gray cell indicates the character was not in the installment.

Alien vs. Predator cast
Character	Films	
Character	Alien vs. Predator	Aliens vs. Predator: Requiem
Character	2004	2007
Creatures
Xenomorphs	Tom Woodruff Jr. (Note: A combination of practical and CGI special effects are used to portray Aliens, in his alien-form.)	Tom Woodruff Jr.
Yautjas	Ian Whyte (Scar, Chopper, Celtic and Elder)	Ian Whyte (Wolf); Matthew Charles Santoro^{V} Bobby "Slim" Jones (Bull) Ian Feuer (Bone Grill)
Alien Queen	CGI	
Predalien	CGI	Tom Woodruff Jr. (Note: A combination of practical and CGI special effects are used to portray Predalien, in alien-form.)
Humans
Alexa "Lex" Woods	Sanaa Lathan	
Charles Bishop Weyland	Lance Henriksen	
Sebastian De Rosa	Raoul Bova	
Graeme Miller	Ewen Bremner	
Maxwell "Max" Stafford	Colin Salmon	
Mark Verheiden	Tommy Flanagan	
Joe Connors	Joseph Rye	
Adele Rousseau	Agathe de La Boulaye	
Thomas "Tom" Parkes	Sam Troughton	
Rustin Quinn	Carsten Norgaard	
Dallas Howard		Steven Pasquale
Kelly O'Brien		Reiko Aylesworth
Eddie Morales		John Ortiz
Ricky Howard		Johnny Lewis
Molly O'Brien		Ariel Gade
Tim O'Brien		Sam Trammell
Colonel Stevens		Robert Joy
Jesse Salinger		Kristen Hager
Dale Collins		David Paetkau
Drew Roberts		David Hornsby
Darcy Benson		Chelah Horsdal
Carrie Adams		Gina Holden
Deputy Ray Adams		Chris William Martin
Deputy Joe		James Chutter
Ms. Cullen Yutani		Francoise Yip^{C}

=== Additional production and crew details ===
Film	Crew/Detail					
Film	Composer(s)	Cinematographer	Editor(s)	Production companies	Distributing companies	Running time
Alien vs. Predator (2004)	Harald Kloser	David Johnson	Alexander Berner	Davis Entertainment, Brandywine Productions, Impact Pictures, Stillking Films	20th Century Fox	101 minutes
Aliens vs. Predator: Requiem (2007)	Brian Tyler	Daniel C. Pearl	Dan Zimmerman	Davis Entertainment, Brandywine Productions, Dune Entertainment	20th Century Fox	94 minutes

== Reception ==
=== Box office performance ===
Box office performance of Alien vs. Predator films
Film	Year	Box office gross			Budget	Ref.
Film	Year	North America	Other territories	Worldwide	Budget	Ref.
Alien vs. Predator	2004	$80,282,231	$97,144,859	$177,427,090	$60–70 million	
Aliens vs. Predator: Requiem	2007	$41,797,066	$88,493,819	$130,290,885	$40 million	
Total		$122,079,297	$185,638,678	$307,717,975	$100–110 million	

=== Critical and public response ===
The Alien vs. Predator duology has received a negative critical response, with the primary source of criticism being the plot, lighting and editing. On Metacritic, the duology has received a score of 29 out of 100 indicating "generally unfavorable reviews".

Critical reception of Alien vs. Predator films
Film	Rotten Tomatoes	Metacritic	CinemaScore
Alien vs. Predator	21% (146 reviews)	29 (21 reviews)	B
Aliens vs. Predator: Requiem	12% (78 reviews)	29 (14 reviews)	C

=== Accolades ===
Award nominations for Alien vs. Predator film
Organization	Award category	Recipients	Result
BMI Film Music Award	BMI Film Music Award	Harald Kloser	Won
Golden Raspberry Awards	Worst Prequel or Sequel		Nominated

Award nominations for Aliens vs. Predator: Requiem film
Organization	Award category	Recipients	Result
MTV Movie Awards	Best Fight	The Alien vs. the Predator	Nominated
Golden Raspberry Awards	Worst Prequel or Sequel		Nominated
Golden Raspberry Awards	Worst Excuse for a Horror Movie		Nominated

== Music ==
Soundtracks to Alien vs. Predator films
Title	U.S. release date	Length	Composer(s)	Label
Alien vs. Predator (Original Motion Picture Soundtrack)	August 9, 2004	60:12	Harald Kloser	Varèse Sarabande
Aliens vs. Predator: Requiem (Original Motion Picture Soundtrack)	December 11, 2007	77:11	Brian Tyler	Varèse Sarabande

"Wach auf!" from German industrial metal group Oomph!'s appeared in the German version of Aliens vs. Predator: Requiem and was released as a single to tie-in with the film.

== Home media ==
Home media releases for Alien vs. Predator films
Title	Format	Release date	Films	Ref.
The Ultimate Alien & Predator Collection	DVD	May 28, 2007	Alien, Aliens, Predator, Predator 2, Alien 3, Alien Resurrection, Alien vs. Predator	
Alien vs. Predator: The Ultimate Showdown	DVD	November 27, 2007	Alien, Aliens, Predator, Predator 2, Alien 3, Alien Resurrection, Alien vs. Predator	
AVP: Aliens vs. Predator – Unrated 2-Pack	Blu-ray	April 15, 2008	Alien vs. Predator, Aliens vs. Predator: Requiem	
AVP – Collector's Boxset	Blu-ray	October 20, 2008	Alien vs. Predator, Aliens vs. Predator: Requiem	
Alien/Predator: Total Destruction – The Ultimate DVD Collection	DVD	May 12, 2008	Alien, Aliens, Predator, Predator 2, Alien 3, Alien Resurrection, Alien vs. Predator, Aliens vs. Predator: Requiem	
Alien/Predator: Total Destruction Collection	DVD	October 14, 2008	Alien, Aliens, Predator, Predator 2, Alien 3, Alien Resurrection, Alien vs. Predator, Aliens vs. Predator: Requiem	
Alien/AVP/Predator – The Ultimate Annihilation: Nine Movie Collection	Blu-ray	November 16, 2011	Alien, Aliens, Predator, Predator 2, Alien 3, Alien Resurrection, Alien vs. Predator, Aliens vs. Predator: Requiem, Predators	
AVP: 2 Movie Pack	DVD/Blu-ray	October 1, 2012	Alien vs. Predator, Aliens vs. Predator: Requiem	

== Other media ==
There exists a great number of spin-offs in other media, including a large number of crossovers within the Alien/Predator fictional universe.

=== Novels ===
Several novelizations based upon the movies have been released.

The Machiko Noguchi Saga

- Aliens vs. Predator: Prey (1994) by Steve Perry
- Aliens vs. Predator: Hunter's Planet (1994) by Dave Bischoff
- Aliens vs. Predator: War (1999) by S.D. Perry
- The Complete Aliens vs. Predator Omnibus – collects Prey, Hunter's Planet and War (Titan Books, November 2016, ISBN 1-78565-199-4)

Other novels

- Alien vs. Predator: The Movie Novelization (2004) by Marc Cerasini
- Alien vs. Predator: Armageddon (2016) by Tim Lebbon

=== Comic books ===
Dark Horse Comics published various lines based on the franchise, starring the character of Machiko Noguchi. The Fire and Stone (2014–2015) and Life and Death (2016–2017) series crosses over the continuities of Alien vs. Predator and Prometheus with graphic novel sequels. Marvel Comics acquired the comic book rights to the Alien vs. Predator franchise in 2020, in addition to the rights to the Alien and Predator franchises at the request of Disney.

=== Books ===
Other books expanding this fictional universe has been released through the years, and also such that depict the background to the films, including works by special effects company Amalgamated Dynamics Incorporated (ADI) which has worked on all the Alien, Predator, and Alien vs. Predator films.

- Aliens versus Predator: Prima's Official Strategy Guide (1999)
- Aliens versus Predator: Gold Edition: Prima's Official Strategy Guide (2000)
- Aliens versus Predator 2: Prima's Official Strategy Guide (2001)
- Alien vs. Predator: The Creature Effects of ADI (by Alec Gillis and Tom Woodruff, Jr., Design Studio Press, August 2004, ISBN 0-9726676-5-2)
- Aliens / Predator: Panel to Panel (2006)
- Aliens vs. Predator: Requiem – Inside the Monster Shop (by Alec Gillis and Tom Woodruff, Jr., Design Studio Press, December 2007, ISBN 1-933492-55-4, Titan Books, January 2008, ISBN 1-84576-909-0)
- Aliens vs. Predator: Bradygames Official Strategy Guide (2010)
- Aliens vs. Predators: Ultimate Prey (2022)
- Aliens vs. Predators: Rift War (2022)

=== Video games ===
The 1993 SFC beat 'em up Alien vs. Predator was developed by Jorudan and Published by Activision (NA, PAL) and IGS (JP).

Game Boy version Alien vs. Predator: The Last of His Clan was Developed by ASK Kodansha.

An Alien vs. Predator arcade beat 'em up game was released by Capcom in 1994, following a now-android Dutch Schaefer and Linn Kurosawa of the United States Colonial Marine Corps as they join forces with two Yautja to fend off an invasion of xenomorphs. Two other Alien vs Predator games were also published by Activision for the SNES and Game Boy in 1993. There were also several Alien vs. Predator mobile games, and two cancelled titles for the Atari Lynx and Game Boy Advance.

In 1994, Atari Corporation released the Rebellion Developments-developed first-person shooter Alien vs Predator for the Atari Jaguar, in which one could play as an Alien, Marine, or Predator. Rebellion then went on to develop the similarly themed 1999's Aliens versus Predator for the PC. This was followed by, among others, Aliens Versus Predator 2 and the expansion pack Aliens Versus Predator 2: Primal Hunt. In 2003, a real-time strategy game Aliens Versus Predator: Extinction was made for the PS2 and Xbox featuring three campaign modes for both races as well as humans. It featured several variations of Predators and Aliens seen throughout the films and other forms of media including the famous Predalien. In 2010, Sega released a reboot, Aliens vs. Predator, a multiplatform first-person shooter also made by Rebellion and tied into the timeline of the live-action films.

Both Alien and Predator appear as downloadable characters in Mortal Kombat X (2015).

The film series' characters of Predators in the franchise appeared in the video game Predator: Hunting Grounds (2020).

=== Pinball ===
Zen Studios developed and released a virtual pinball based upon the 1986 film Aliens, the 2004 film Alien vs. Predator, and the 2014 video game Alien: Isolation in the Aliens vs. Pinball collection, available as an add-on pack for Zen Pinball 2, Pinball FX 2 and Pinball FX 3 on April 26, 2016. The three tables features 3D animated figures of Ellen Ripley, Alexa Woods, Amanda Ripley, the Alien, and the Predator.

=== Board games ===
- Aliens/Predator (1997)
- Aliens vs. Predator: Alien Resurrection Expansion Set (1998)
- Aliens vs. Predator (2010)
- AVP: The Hunt Begins (2015): In 2013, Prodos obtained the license from 20th Century Fox to do a boardgame and successfully funded it on Kickstarter.
- AVP: Alien Warriors (2015)
- Clue: Alien vs. Predator (2016)
- AVP: Unleashed (2017)
- AVP: Evolved Aliens (2018)
- AVP: Hot Landing Zone (2019)

=== Action figures ===
During the 1980s and 1990s, Halcyon Models released seventeen Alien model kits, beginning in 1987, as well as a Predator 2 model kit in 1994.

In 1994, Kenner released a collection of action figures known as Aliens vs. Predator. This followed the two initial series of Aliens that were based on an animated series, Operation: Aliens, which was never broadcast. As such, the inclusion of Predator is often considered the 3rd and 4th series of the Aliens line. This collection includes several Aliens, many of which feature built-in attack functions, and Predators, that have removable masks and battle weapons such as spears and missile launchers. The figures generally possess five points of articulation, and some include a mini Dark Horse comic book.

While the collection as a whole is known as Aliens vs. Predator, the two character types have their own card art that only features the character at hand. An exception would be the Aliens vs. Predator 2-pack. Since human space marines were included in the initial Aliens line, the Predator was marketed as an alternative enemy to the Aliens. A figure cardback reads: "The stage is set for the universe's two most ferocious enemies. It's the gruesome and evil Aliens against the big-game hunter Predator. Who will win... the beast or the hunter? Can the Predator stop the evil Aliens before the galaxy is destroyed?!?!?!"

In 1998, Kay Bee Toys released the Kenner produced Aliens: Hive Wars line featuring Aliens, Marines, and Predators. More figures, including a female Predator and an Alien/Predator/Smash Mason 3-pack, were designed for this series, but never released as part of the line.

Six sets of Aliens and Predator Micro Machines were also planned by Galoob in 1995, but never released. This would have also included the LV-426/Outer World Station Action Fleet Playset. Thanks in part to the research of toy collectors, many photos of these unreleased toys and prototypes have shown up online in recent years.

In December 2002, McFarlane Toys released a highly detailed Alien vs. Predator deluxe set. In 2004, they produced a series of figures based on the Alien vs. Predator film. Alongside the articulated figures, McFarlane also released statuesque display sets depicting scenes from the film.

Hot Toys produced highly detailed 16" tall figures for every film including Aliens vs. Predator: Requiem in 2007.

NECA has produced various lines of Alien vs. Predator figures for several years. In 2007, they released two series of Requiem figures.

In 2013, a line of ReAction Figures Alien and Predator toys were produced.

Originally having produced figures based on the 2013 video game Aliens: Colonial Marines, Hiya Toys has also released figures based on Predator, Predator 2, and Alien: Covenant.

Funko Pop! Vinyl currently produces ongoing lines of Alien vs. Predator figures.

Minimates produces ongoing lines of Alien vs. Predator figures.

Loot Crate and Titans Vinyl Figures have collaborated in producing several figures and other merchandise based on characters and creatures from the Alien vs. Predator universe.

Eaglemoss Collections currently produces the ongoing Alien & Predator line of figures based on characters and creatures from the Alien vs. Predator universe.

=== Theme park attractions ===
On August 4, 2014, Universal Studios confirmed that there will be haunted mazes based on Alien vs. Predator for their Halloween Horror Nights events at both Universal Studios Hollywood and Universal Studios Florida.

== See also ==
- Alien franchise
- Predator franchise
- RoboCop Versus The Terminator
- List of space science fiction franchises
- List of films featuring extraterrestrials
- List of monster movies
