= Aliens vs. Predator (2010 video game) =

- Developer: Rebellion Developments
- Publisher: Sega
- Director: Tim Jones
- Producer: David Brickley
- Designer: Alex Moore
- Programmer: Andy Tate
- Artist: Sam Grice
- Writers: Gordon Rennie; James Worrall
- Composer: Mark Rutherford
- Platforms: PlayStation 3; Windows; Xbox 360
- Release: NA: 16 February 2010; AU: 18 February 2010; EU: 19 February 2010
- Genre: First-person shooter
- Modes: Single-player, multiplayer

Aliens vs. Predator is a 2010 first-person shooter video game developed by Rebellion Developments and published by Sega for Microsoft Windows, PlayStation 3 and Xbox 360. Additionally, the game can be purchased from the Xbox digital store and played on Xbox One and Xbox Series consoles through the Xbox backwards compatibility program.

In the game, a Weyland-Yutani research team discovers an ancient Predator Pyramid and hopes to unlock the advanced technology while studying the resident Aliens. However, when the Aliens escape, a unit of United States Colonial Marine Corps responds to neutralize the threat while the Predator Race also send three of their members to investigate. The game is not a sequel to the previous game Aliens versus Predator 2, but a reboot based on the Alien vs. Predator franchise, a combination of the characters and creatures of the Alien franchise and the Predator franchise. Rebellion previously developed the 1994 Atari Jaguar game and the 1999 Microsoft Windows game.

== Gameplay ==
There are three campaigns in the game, one for each race/faction (the Colonial Marines, the Aliens, and the Predators), that, while separate in terms of individual plot and gameplay, form one overarching storyline. Following the storyline of the campaign modes comes the multiplayer aspect of the game. In this Multiplayer section of the game, players face off in various game types in various ways.

=== Alien ===
Aliens fight in close-quarters combat with their claws and tails, getting as close as possible to their prey as quickly as possible. Aliens have the ability to climb walls and jump from distances without much effort and can blend in with shadows, using darkness to their advantage. Within limited ranges, aliens can seek out prey through walls. These senses also allow Aliens to clearly observe cloaked Predators. In the single-player campaign, players have the opportunity to harvest "hosts". By pinning the host, nearby facehuggers are able to locate and latch on to them, thereby propagating the Hive. Throughout the game, the player also has the opportunity to perform "stealth kills".

=== Marine ===
The Colonial Marine campaign is far closer to that of a standard first-person shooter. Marines carry a wide arsenal including pulse rifles, flamethrowers, and auto-tracking smartguns. To help navigate the surroundings, marines are equipped with shoulder-mounted lamps, surveying flares to briefly illuminate darkened areas, and motion trackers, capable of providing info on hostile positioning as they move.

=== Predator ===
As in the films, the Predator prefers to stalk its prey from the safety of treetops and the gameplay reflects this, the player leaping from branch to branch automatically with the help of a "focus jumping" game mechanic. The Predator has different vision modes, the most recognizable from the films being a thermal imaging scanner, but the player also has different vision modes for spotting Aliens (only accessible from a special mask the player picks up in-game) and viewing the world normally. For example, the Heat Vision mode allows the player to see Marines very clearly, while it renders Aliens nearly invisible; the Alien vision works in reverse, making aliens appear clearly and Marines nearly invisible. Regular vision allows one to see the environment and other Predators better than the former two visions, making battles between two or all three species a tactical juggle to prioritize enemies based on their threat to the player.

The Predator's gameplay is more based on stealth and tactics than the average first-person shooter. The player has to be aware of Aliens, which have the ability to see through a Predator's cloaking device, that may climb up a tree and attack from below as well as taking care not to reveal themselves to marines too early as the marines' weaponry and numbers are more than a match for the Predator. For long-range weaponry, the Predator can use a shoulder-mounted plasma cannon in addition proximity mines to a chakram-like disc and a combi stick (or throwing spear). For close-range combat, the Predator has four retractable wristblades on its arms.

The wrist blades allow for the Predator to perform a "trophy kill", a nod to the movies in which the Predators take trophies, usually skulls, from their defeated enemies to show their prowess in the hunt. OXM labeled the trophy kill mechanic as "spectacularly violent" and it has been partially censored to avoid an Adults Only rating in the United States as it was "several measures more graphic" than any other recent games. There are several animations, one of which is a "terrified" marine dragged into the center of the screen by his or her throat, which the Predator then snaps effortlessly with the accompanying sound of "someone biting into raw celery". The neck broken, the Predator cuts the marine's head off, with a "sizable portion" of the spinal cord following. Even after this, the marine is still alive for a short period of time, "gasping his last, with nothing but bloodied, glistening vertebral column beneath his chin."

A screenshot showing a player being attacked by a group of Aliens

Jason Kingsley, the CEO of Rebellion, defended the brutality of the trophy-kill system, stating "This is obviously a game based on adult-rated movies, and we want to make sure it's very clearly an adult-rated game. It's an issue for me; some computer games are for kids– we're not making a computer game here for anyone other than adults. That's very clear and within that context, I think the violence is part of the character and the world– so we're talking about a fantasy world here and fantasy creatures and we're talking about trying to build up a mythos. I remember the first time I saw it, one of the particular Predator kills, everyone went 'Oooh'. But it's what the Predator does in the movies."

The Predator campaign explains how their species considers the war tactics of the human Marines juvenile. A quote from the intro states: "We are old, my brother. Our race is few and scattered. Our ancestry lost to myth. The humans are still children, creatures of desire and hubris, with no comprehension of the long hunt. Still, they make good sport. They have discovered a trophy long locked away. They must not be allowed to find the crucible that spawned our most respected prey. If they succeed, all life will succumb to the crawling dark...".

== Plot ==
=== Alien ===
As an Xenomorph, the game begins in a research facility, where two humans are being kept as prisoners. As they awake, Chestbursters erupt from their bodies; killing them. As scientists enter the room to collect the specimens, they find "Specimen 6" missing. The missing chestburster then emerges from the second victim's mouth, evading a collection tube and forcing head scientist Dr. Groves to gas the room; killing the other scientists and subduing the chestburster. However, Mr. Weyland prevents the creature's death, as he's impressed with its cunning, and tells Groves to transfer it to a special program; giving it the codename '6'.

Days later, Six is fully grown. During an observation of its abilities, Weyland opens the door to the ancient pyramid built by the Predators' ancestors. In response, the pyramid emits an electromagnetic pulse that disables the local human colony's systems, including Six's restraints, allowing it to escape and release the other captive Xenomorphs and their Queen. Once free, the Aliens retreat to the nearby refinery, where they establish a hive and go dormant until the Colonial Marines arrive.

From there, Six and the other Xenomorphs slaughter or harvest any humans they encounter before facing off with a group of Predators. Six weakens an Elite Predator named Wolf, leading him to be harvested by a facehugger and later give rise to a Predalien (seen in the Predator campaign). While returning to the Hive, Six sees a debilitating vision of the Queen being killed in an explosion and goes into a hibernation state. It's found by combat androids led by Weyland, who takes pity on it and brings it back with him. Once on board the humans' ship, Six escapes, slaughters the crew and molts into a new Queen.

=== Marine ===
As a Marine, the game starts out above the planet, with two Marine squads on separate ships, one of which is identified as the USS Marlow. When the Predators' ship de-cloaks and destroys the Marlow, Major Van Zandt directs the surviving shuttle to land. The player Marine, dubbed "Rookie", is knocked out during the drop, and regains consciousness in the heart of the chaos itself. At Corporal Tequila's direction, Rookie is sent into several parts of the wrecked human colony with the purpose of getting systems back online and locating any surviving Marines, especially Major Van Zandt. However, the Major is discovered cocooned, forcing Rookie to shoot him.

Moving further into the newly established hive within the refinery, Rookie encounters the Alien Queen and kills her in an explosion with some help from Tequila. Traversing the jungle, Rookie is contacted by Tequila on board a dropship coming to pick him up, but the ship comes under fire from a Predator and crashes before the rescue can be made. The now-stranded Rookie receives assistance from the colony's administrative android, Katya. Following Katya's instruction, Rookie is able to locate other survivors throughout the ruins and fights and kills a Predator before finally rescuing Tequila in the Alien hive, but not before she was implanted with a chestburster. Tequila asks the Rookie to shoot her, but Katya informs him that she can extract the alien via surgery. Weyland finds out about this during the procedure and cuts off the power. Rookie is forced to put Tequila into a stasis capsule to prevent the alien from "bursting" and killing her.

With their dropship and the Marlow destroyed, Katya tells Rookie that Weyland has a datapad that can contact his personal dropship and get them off the planet. Rookie goes below the facility to confront Weyland, where he discovers he was also an android, before defeating it and successfully calling "Weyland's" dropship; getting himself, Tequila, and Katya off world. They are then seen in cryo-sleep while the pilot uploads the datapad's contents to an older-looking Weyland, who appears delighted to learn that a "live specimen" was secured and the coordinates to the Xenomorph homeworld was discovered.

=== Predator ===
As a Predator, the game starts in the jungles of Yautja Prime, where a Youngblood proves himself worthy of being called an "Elite". Once the trials are complete, the young Predator, "Dark", is dispatched by his clan leader, Spartan, with a group of Elites, including Wolf and an unnamed Yautja, in order to investigate a distress call sent by a young blood hunting party on another planet (BG 386).

After dispatching the USS Marlow, Dark locates the dead Youngbloods and sets their bracers to self-destruct before making trophies of the Marines for desecrating their sacred hunting grounds. Along the way, he obtains several new weapons to assist him, such as proximity mines and a smart disc belonging to the unnamed Yautja that accompanied him and Wolf, who was killed by the Xenomorphs after heading to the refinery; he sets its wrist braver to detonate. While in the ruins, he finds the mask of an ancient and legendary Predator named Lord, the first successful Alien hunter and Dark's distant ancestor. When he replaces his own mask with that of Lord, it plays back holographic images of the Predators' first victory over the Aliens. It is at this point that Dark is instructed to find the ancient Predator's wrist bracer.

Dark battles his way through a Weyland-Yutani research lab overrun with Xenomorphs and combat androids to acquire the wrist bracer, killing a Praetorian before venturing down to the Predators' pyramid, where he places the wrist bracer on Lord's tomb and activates its self-destruct feature. During the countdown, he encounters a Predalien harvested from Wolf, which an outraged Spartan calls an "Abomination", and he orders Dark to defeat it. After a fierce battle, Dark eventually manages to kill the Abomination, hauling its corpse onto the top of the research lab before mimicking his ancestor by throwing its body off the roof in disgust, while the Mother Ship looms overhead. After killing the Abomination, Dark returns to his ship, where the other Predators bow to him in respect, and the Predators depart BG 386 as the pyramid, research lab, and Lord's tomb are destroyed by the wrist bracer's self-destruct feature.

As the ship flies through space, Dark's ancestral mask shows him data on an unknown planet, implied to be the Xenomorph home planet, where his clan is to have their greatest hunt.

== Development ==
In December 2008, a Kotaku article stated that Sega had announced that an Aliens vs. Predator video game was being developed. This meant that Sega's other then-upcoming game, Aliens: Colonial Marines, would be pushed back so Aliens vs. Predator could be released first. It was later confirmed that Lance Henriksen was involved as one of the characters of the game; he plays Karl Bishop Weyland. with Wolf from Aliens vs. Predator: Requiem being available as a character skin for the Yautja/Predator player character.

=== Music ===
This was Mark Rutherford's first video game score. It was 70 minutes of live orchestral score recorded in Slovakia with the Istropolis Philharmonic Orchestra. To create a unique and original sound for the Alien and the Predator he made his own percussion kits constructed from bits of metal and various tools which were then scraped and hit with nails, sticks, brushes, and mallets.

=== Australian controversy ===
An early build of the game was submitted for review to the OFLC, but was denied classification in Australia in 2009 and effectively banned for sale altogether. Sega announced that there would not be a re-cut version released in Australia, and that it would appeal the decision. The game's refusal of classification again brought up the issue of a need for an R18+ rating in games, a move supported by many members of the public and government members.

On 18 December 2009, Sega won the appeal on the classification of the game in Australia. "It is with great pleasure that we announce the success of our appeal," says Darren Macbeth, managing director of Sega Australia. "We are particularly proud that the game will be released in its original entirety, with no content altered or removed whatsoever. Australian gamers applaud the Classification Review Board on making a decision that clearly considers the context of the game, and is in line with the modern expectations of reasonable Australians."

The Board noted that "the violence depicted in the game can be accommodated within the MA 15+ category as the violent scenes are not prolonged and are interspersed with longer non-violent sequences. The violence is fantastical in nature and justified by the context of the game, set in a futuristic science-fiction world, inhabited by aliens and predators. This context serves to lessen its impact. The more contentious violence is randomly generated and is not dependent on the player selection of specific moves."

== Downloadable content ==
Two additional map packs have been released for purchase via Steam, PlayStation Network and the Xbox Live Marketplace entitled Swarm and Bughunt. The Swarm Map Pack and Bughunt Map Pack were respectively released on 19 March – 9 July 2010. Both downloads provide new multiplayer maps and survivor maps.

== Reception ==
=== Critical reception ===
Reception

Aggregate score
Aggregator	Score		
Aggregator	PC	PS3	Xbox 360
Metacritic	68/100	65/100	64/100

Review scores
Publication	Score		
Publication	PC	PS3	Xbox 360
Destructoid	6.5/10	N/A	6.5/10
Eurogamer	N/A	N/A	6/10
Game Informer	N/A	5.75/10	5.75/10
GamePro	N/A	3/5	3/5
GameRevolution	N/A	D+	D+
GameSpot	5.5/10	5.5/10	5.5/10
GameSpy	N/A	N/A	2.5/5
GameTrailers	N/A	N/A	7.7/10
GameZone	6/10	6/10	6/10
Giant Bomb	N/A	N/A	2/5
IGN	7.3/10	(UK) 8.5/10 (US) 7/10	(UK) 8.5/10 (US) 7/10
Official Xbox Magazine (US)	N/A	N/A	7/10
PC Gamer (UK)	65%	N/A	N/A
PlayStation: The Official Magazine	N/A	4/5	N/A
The A.V. Club	N/A	N/A	C
The Daily Telegraph	N/A	6/10	6/10

Aliens vs. Predator received "mixed or average reviews" on all platforms according to the review aggregation website Metacritic. Official Xbox Magazine UK praised the game for its "superb atmosphere" and "unique multiplayer", but criticized the odd melee system and how the marines could knock back an alien, relieving some of the atmosphere. The most scathing review came from 1UP, who found the multiplayer hard to recommend over the nearly a decade old Aliens versus Predator 2, describing it as "ultimately thin and awkward". GameZone''s Dakota Grabowski said: "If the recent films on the Aliens vs. Predator franchise haven't been painful enough to sit through, then perhaps video gamers worldwide are ready to stomach Sega and Rebellion's pitiful offering. Delivering poor results and half-baked ideas, it's my regret to call Aliens vs. Predator the year's most disappointing title thus far."

411Mania gave the PlayStation 3 version a score of 7.9 out of 10 and called it "a solid game with its fair share of problems. For fans of the franchise, you'll be able to look over the blemishes and find a game that you'll be playing for months. For those that aren't into the Aliens vs. Predator franchise, well, what the hell is wrong with you? Good or bad, I think we can all agree on one thing: This is the greatest game ever made where you can pull a guy's spine out while he screams for mercy." However, The Daily Telegraph gave the PS3 and Xbox 360 versions a score of six out of ten and said that the game "lacks the action set pieces that helped to push the FPS genre to where it is today." The A.V. Club gave the Xbox 360 version a C and said, "The always-terrific Lance Henriksen is on hand to put a human face on—and lend some soul to—this otherwise soulless experience. Yet in the end, his character turns out to be just as hollow as the videogame he's starring in." Edge gave the game five out of ten and called it "a hastily assembled three-in-one anachronism which proves just one thing: that terrifying and terrible are not mutually exclusive."

=== Sales ===
Despite its mixed critical reception, Aliens vs. Predator debuted at number one on the UK all formats chart. It was the fastest-selling game of 2010 in the UK, breaking the record previously held by BioShock 2. It was also the best-selling game on Steam, as well as on the retail PC charts.

As of 14 May 2010, Aliens vs. Predator had sold over 1.69 million copies worldwide. The game has grossed £14 million in the UK alone previously making it the highest grossing Alien game of all time.

== Sequel ==
In 2010, Jason Kingsley, the co-founder and CEO of Rebellion Developments, said that the developer was in discussions with Sega about creating a sequel. Kingsley expressed his personal desire to revisit the franchise.

== See also ==
- List of Alien, Predator, and Alien vs. Predator games
