= Aliens vs. Predator: Requiem (video game) =

- European cover art
- Developer: Rebellion Developments
- Publisher: Vivendi Games (Note: Released under the Sierra Entertainment brand name)
- Designer: Tim Jones
- Platform: PlayStation Portable
- Release: NA: 13 November 2007; EU: 30 November 2007; AU: 6 December 2007
- Genre: Action
- Modes: Single-player, multiplayer

Aliens vs. Predator: Requiem is a 2007 action game exclusive to the PlayStation Portable, developed by Rebellion Developments and published by Vivendi Games. It was released in November 2007 in North America and Europe, and December 2007 in Australia. It is part of the Alien vs. Predator franchise, an amalgamation of the Alien and Predator franchises. Aliens vs. Predator: Requiem is a tie-in to the film of the same title, which was released shortly after the game.

This game's plot is loosely based on the film, as players gain this role of the film's primary Yautja – Wolf. After the events of the first film of the Alien vs. Predator franchise, the Wolf Predator has been charged by his society to hunt down and destroy any trace of Alien activity in a small American town, in order to avoid its detection by humanity.

This game received negative reviews from critics and was described as another entry in a long line of poorly developed movie tie-ins similarly. Reviewers enjoyed the opportunity to play as a Predator, but complained that the game was too easy and not rewarding, particularly the simple artificial intelligence of enemies. The visuals and audio of the game were also considered of poor quality.

== Gameplay ==
Aliens vs. Predator: Requiem is a third-person action-adventure game. The single-player campaign is composed of 15 missions and features the Predator from the film. The player has access to Predator weapons as seen in movies and other sources in the franchise, including claws and a shoulder-mounted energy cannon. New weapons from the corresponding film include an energy pistol and dual shoulder cannons.

The Wolf Predator, on the right with claws extended, in battle against several Aliens

The player character also has stealth camouflage and several vision modes that allow him to see in the dark, such as infrared vision. Health is represented by a segmented life bar that regenerates after a successful kill, and an energy bar is also available to provide power for the Predator's weapons. In addition to destroying Aliens, the Predator must eradicate other traces of their presence, including facehugger husks. Aliens, husks, humans, and other potential targets are all represented by icons on a heads-up display. The game's camera is manipulated by pressing the PlayStation Portable (PSP)'s triggers, and the Predator can "lock on" to opponents using a first-person view to target them with his ranged weapons.

Aliens vs. Predator: Requiem uses a system of "honor points" to award points to players for actions considered honorable for Predators. For instance, "tagging" an enemy in first-person mode before killing it adds points, while killing humans reduces points. Honor points are used at the end of each mission to upgrade the Predator's weapons and equipment. In addition to the campaign, a single-player mode called "Skirmish" is available, in which players have five minutes to dispose of as many Aliens as possible in one of the game's maps. Skirmish can also be played in a cooperative setting with one other player using the PSP's "ad hoc" local wireless mode.

== Plot ==
The protagonist Wolf Predator has come to Earth in response to a distress signal from a comrade's ship. Upon his arrival in the small Colorado town of Gunnison, he learns that Aliens have begun terrorizing the local populace. His mission is to destroy the Aliens and remove any trace of their activity. After reaching his comrades' ship and erasing its traces from Earth, Wolf's only mission is to exterminate all Aliens in the vicinity.

Wolf travels through rural and urban areas of Gunnison, fighting more Aliens along the way, and occasionally being harassed by human soldiers and civilians. Finally, the main Alien lair is found in a hospital, where several mines are set by Wolf to bring the Hive down. The game concludes with the final fight against an attacking helicopter and the hospital's destruction. Suddenly, the Alien Queen is seen appearing out of the hospital's rubble, only to be destroyed, along with the entire town, by a nuclear warhead, while Wolf successfully leaves Earth.

== Development ==
Alien vs. Predator began as a franchise in February 1990, when Dark Horse Comics published a comic book featuring Aliens from the Alien series of films in battle against the title characters of Predator. Both franchises are owned by Twentieth Century Fox. In November 1990, Fox released Predator 2, and one of the final scenes in the film showed an Alien skull inside a trophy case aboard a Predator ship. Fox began licensing merchandise for the new franchise, including comic books and video games. In 1993, the first Aliens vs. Predator video game was released; Alien vs Predator for the Super Nintendo Entertainment System.

British independent game studio Rebellion Developments became involved with the franchise in 1994 with the release of Alien vs Predator for the Atari Jaguar, described by 1UP.com as "probably the only good Jaguar game ever made". Rebellion later developed an enhanced remake of the game for the PC, which was the first PC game to require a video card and went on to win a BAFTA award. The first feature film in the franchise, Alien vs. Predator, was released in 2004 and did not include a tie-in video game. In August 2007, Sierra Entertainment announced that the company had partnered with Fox to produce a video game corresponding with the sequel film Aliens vs. Predator: Requiem. Rebellion was identified as the game's developer. The company, while not strictly handheld-focused, has a reputation in the industry for developing PSP games.

Aliens vs. Predator: Requiem was developed exclusively for the PSP. Regarding PSP exclusivity, Rebellion lead designer Tim Jones explained "It was basically a matter of logistics. We have a strong heritage with the PSP and have done a number of successful titles such as Star Wars Battlefront: Renegade Squadron". Rebellion decided to forego the first-person shooter format of their earlier Alien vs. Predator games and instead focused on a third-person perspective, with the player taking the role of a lone Predator. Unlike previous Rebellion Alien vs. Predator titles, Aliens vs. Predator: Requiem does not permit players to take the role of Aliens or human Marines, but rather Wolf, the Yautja protagonist of the film. The company used a game engine of its own creation, and Hal Zabie, associate producer at Sierra Entertainment, said "...the challenge was to deliver high quality graphics while not sacrificing game performance and this is something that Rebellion achieved and will be noticed by players right away."

Rebellion was given materials from the film's production, including footage and the full script, in order to recreate the feel of the film and lend authenticity to the game. The game's plot is loosely based on the film's, with the player character Wolf working to remove traces of Alien and Predator presence in a small American town. Despite similarities to the movie, the ending is different and the game does not feature the "predalien", a Predator-Alien hybrid introduced in Alien vs. Predator. The directors of the film, the Brothers Strause, are fans of Rebellion's PC Aliens vs. Predator game and worked with the studio to develop Aliens vs. Predator: Requiem's premise. In an interview with IGN, Rebellion's Tim Jones said "Fox is very protective of their franchise and take [sic] great care to make sure it is treated properly. We had to work within strict confines to remain consistent with the movie and everything we did had to be approved by the studio." The game's system of honor points was considered crucial by Rebellion, who felt that the Predators, despite being the "bad guys", were characterized by a strict code of honor.

"AvP Requiem PSP is set in Gunnison, the same small town as seen in the movie. The player assumes the role of the new elite Predator from the film. While many of the locations, weapons, and scenarios are nearly identical to the film, the game designers were given the freedom to make the best game possible, which meant at times rearranging some of the story elements and action set pieces."

— Hal Zabie, associate producer at Sierra Entertainment

Sierra described the game's development as challenging because portable consoles lack the processing power of larger machines. Rebellion complained about the PSP's lack of a second analog thumbstick, stating that it made creating a usable control scheme challenging. They also stated that because the game's protagonist preferred to work alone, Aliens vs. Predator: Requiem would not contain a multiplayer cooperative mode for the single-player campaign, but a "Survival Mode" minigame would be available where two players could work together to fight Aliens. The game had a relatively short development cycle, and was made in less time than the movie.

Aliens vs. Predator: Requiem was released on 13 November 2007 in North America, over a month ahead of the film's 25 December opening. It was released on 30 November in Europe and 6 December in Australia.

== Reception ==
Reception

Aggregate score
Aggregator	Score
Metacritic	49/100

Review scores
Publication	Score
1Up.com	D−
Edge	5/10
Eurogamer	4/10
GameRevolution	C−
GameSpot	5/10
GameZone	5/10
IGN	5.5/10
PALGN	5/10
PlayStation: The Official Magazine	3/5
VideoGamer.com	6/10

Aliens vs. Predator: Requiem received "generally unfavorable reviews" according to the review aggregation website Metacritic. It was considered a poor movie tie-in, an analysis typical of such games. Reviewers specifically said the game wasn't "bad", just not "good"—IGN, for instance, said, "AVP doesn't suck, but that isn't to say it's good." GameSpot's reviewer said, "Aliens vs. Predator: Requiem isn't a terrible game; it's just really mediocre." Eurogamer's Ellie Gibson described the game by referencing a colleague's review of Miami Vice: The Game, a previous Rebellion PSP title, which stated "[Miami Vice: The Game is] one of those games that's not bad, but nor is it ever that good." The week before the movie's release, Requiem was listed at #5 on GameFly's most-rented PSP titles list.

One critique was the game's difficulty level, which was described as too easy. Gameplanet called it "shockingly easy" and claimed that upgrades gained through the honor system made the protagonist invincible rather than stronger. Eurogamer noted that "furiously button mashing" was generally sufficient to kill most of the game's enemies.

"Although it's true that a game's difficulty is hardly the sole indicator of its overall quality, every other part of the game is far too mired in blandness to prevent you from drifting off under the spell of mindlessly simple gameplay."

— Shaun McInnis, GameSpot

The artificial intelligence of the game's enemies, the Aliens, was regarded as lacking, and one reviewer noted that their blood was not acidic, a defining characteristic of the creatures from the films. Several reviewers did praise the game's representation of the Predator, however, especially in the early levels.

"Imagine the pitch: 'Ian Predator and Steve Aliens are two neighbours from very different backgrounds. They get on like chalk and cheese, but they learn to tolerate each other's differences through a series of hilarious misunderstandings.'"

— Ellie Gibson, Eurogamer

The game's graphics and audio were not well-received, with IGN commenting, "There's never a moment that makes you step back and say wow. The textures are muted, the Predator looks alright, but everything is pretty forgettable."

Reviewers also took the opportunity to mock the franchise itself, with Eurogamer suggesting that the series be made into a sitcom. Regarding the multiplayer, IGN's Greg Miller said, "This mode was so boring I made up my own story. I was the Mommy Predator and Ryan from the IGN News Team was the Daddy Predator. We were protecting our children -- the cars in the large empty lot we were running around -- from the aliens." 1UP.com's Patrick Klepek said, "Aliens vs. Predator: Requiem fails to capitalize on its gaming heritage, instead falling prey to the same substandard licensed schlock we're used to from the films."

== See also ==
- List of Alien, Predator, and Alien vs. Predator games
