= Alien 3: The Gun =

1993 video game

- Developer: Sega
- Publisher: Sega
- Platform: Arcade
- Release: 1993
- Genre: Rail shooter
- Modes: Single-player, multiplayer
- Arcade system: Sega System 32

Alien 3: The Gun is a 1993 rail shooter arcade video game released by Sega. It is based on the film Alien 3, but focuses on two space Marines.

== Gameplay ==
Alien 3: The Gun is a rail shooter in which the player uses a large positional gun, modeled after the M41A Pulse Rifle featured in Aliens, to kill various Alien creatures such as facehuggers and soldiers, unlike the film, which featured only three Aliens (including a facehugger, an alien runner and a queen chestburster). The player controls a US Colonial Marine who is tasked with reaching the prison colony featured in the film, in order to rescue prisoners who are under attack by the Aliens. The game is played across seven levels, and features various boss enemies, including a giant facehugger. Power-ups, such as a flamethrower, are available to the player throughout the game.

== Plot ==
One or two players can take the role of a pair of United States Colonial Marines in an altered version of the film's storyline. The action begins with an escape from the spaceship Sulaco before proceeding to the surface of Fiorina 'Fury' 161, where players must take down hordes of Aliens as well as an army of Weyland-Yutani Corporation troops sent to retrieve specimens by any means necessary. Levels are based on sets from the film and take players through the Mess Hall, Infirmary, Lead Works and more. The game ends when the players defeat the unidentified man, only to be met with more troops, who soon open fire at them.

== Reception ==
In Japan, Game Machine listed Alien 3: The Gun on their November 1, 1993 issue as being the most-successful upright/cockpit arcade unit of the month. The game was well-received by video game critics. Retrospectively, Stephen Kleckner of GamesBeat wrote positively about Alien 3: The Gun, including it in his "must-play" list of Alien titles and opining it is better than 2006's light gun game Aliens: Extermination. According to Retro Gamer, the "terrifying and glorious" Alien 3 "went leagues beyond the other shoot-'em ups, such as Lethal Enforcers." Jon Thompson of All Game Guide gave it four stars out of five, calling it an "exciting" shooter "that does the movies proud, creating a horror-filled, action-packed atmosphere that should impress both die-hard and casual fans".

== See also ==
- List of Alien, Predator, and Alien vs. Predator games
