= Aliens Versus Predator: Extinction =

2003 video game

- Developer: Zono
- Publishers: Electronic Arts; Fox Interactive
- Producers: Mike Arkin; David Stalker; Matt McKnight
- Designer: Jason Hough
- Composer: Rich Ragsdale
- Platforms: PlayStation 2, Xbox
- Release: PlayStation 2: NA: July 30, 2003; EU/AU: August 8, 2003; Xbox: AU: August 1, 2003; NA: August 5, 2003; EU: August 8, 2003
- Genre: Real-time strategy
- Mode: Single-player

Aliens Versus Predator: Extinction is a 2003 real-time strategy video game developed by Zono and co-published by Fox Interactive and Electronic Arts (EA) for the PlayStation 2 and Xbox. Based on the Alien vs. Predator franchise, the game offers three single player campaigns that cover Alien, Predator, and human storylines. Each storyline and species has unique characteristics and gameplay elements that are adapted from film and comic sources.

Unlike many real-time strategy games, there are no base-building mechanics and resource gathering is extremely limited. Instead, the focus is on unit management and combat.

The game is set on LV-742, a distant planet used by the Predators as a hunting ground for a local Alien hive. Human colonists discover the Alien hive and must deal with a growing war with the Predators.

== Gameplay ==
Aliens Versus Predator: Extinction is a real-time strategy game with a focus on unit management over base-building and resource gathering. Each species has a single resource that is used to summon or upgrade units, and methods of unit generation differ radically. Players must move through specific objectives in order to advance a level, ranging from killing certain enemies or performing tasks like repairing an object. Starting conditions are often dependent on story developments. Each species has a population cap that varies by level. The population cost of units varies drastically between species.

Human units, appearing in the game as the US Colonial Marines, gain credits by killing enemies and repairing atmospheric processors. These credits can be spent on upgrading existing units or calling in new ones via dropship, which drop units off at specific landing beacons. Marine units are entirely medium to long range fighters and have support units to perform specific actions that aren't available to humans like other species (such as healing).

Predator units can only gain resources by killing opponents, which is granted via an "honor" system. As the units gain honor, more units can be summoned via drop pods. Predators can self-heal and cloak themselves, but deplete energy reserves when doing so. There is only one Predator support unit, which improves the rate of energy regeneration.

Alien units gain resources by either killing or immobilizing opponents, which can be used on upgrades to specific units. Unlike humans and Predators, Aliens cannot summon specific units at will and must instead bring corresponding host species to their hive to infest them. All Aliens, with the exception of "pure-bred" strains, have specific hosts that generate them. In order to generate eggs that can infest host units, Aliens must maintain a queen unit at their hive. This queen continuously lays eggs until the population cap has been reached.

The single player campaign spans 21 missions, with 7 levels per species.

== Synopsis ==
=== Setting ===
Aliens Versus Predator: Extinction takes place in a crossover universe between the Alien franchise and the Predator franchise, both owned by 20th Century Fox. The games and comics from the crossover franchise are predominately set in the same era as the film Aliens and as such, the Colonial Marines and Aliens resemble that film's setting and style the most. Humanity's colonization efforts across the galaxy are identical to that of the Alien franchise, as is the involvement of Weyland-Yutani, a shadowy corporation, in the capture and experimentation of Alien and Predator individuals.

=== Plot ===
Sometime in the future, human colonists land on planet LV-742 and discover an Alien hive that was dormant on the planet. The hive wipes out the initial colony, but are nearly destroyed by Marines a few years later. As the war between the Marines and Aliens grows, a clan of Predators land on the planet to prove themselves to their leaders, the Ancients. They quickly come into conflict with both species as they are directed to take trophies from powerful warriors. The Aliens manage to get a queen on a dropship, which takes her to a Predator planet. The hive on LV-742 gains another queen and discover that the Weyland-Yutani Corporation has created a modified version of the Alien species called the K-Series.

Meanwhile, the Predators must compete with rival clans as they are tasked with more pressing hunts. While the Aliens contend with the K-Series, the Predators go head to head with the dangerous Predalien. While Weyland-Yutani attempts to capture Predators, they are unsuccessful after a violent rescue is completed. The Predators deal with the eventual creation of a Predalien queen, leading to the destruction of an entire hive, and the Aliens find themselves exterminating the K-Series Aliens and their creators.

== Reception ==
Reception

Aggregate score
Aggregator	Score	
Aggregator	PS2	Xbox
Metacritic	66/100	64/100

Review scores
Publication	Score	
Publication	PS2	Xbox
Electronic Gaming Monthly	7/10	N/A
Eurogamer	4/10	N/A
Game Informer	6.75/10	6.75/10
GamePro	4/5	3.5/5
GameRevolution	C+	C+
GameSpot	7.2/10	7.2/10
GameSpy	3/5	3/5
GameZone	6.4/10	6.3/10
IGN	6.1/10	6.1/10
Official U.S. PlayStation Magazine	3.5/5	N/A
Official Xbox Magazine (US)	N/A	6/10
The Village Voice	N/A	6/10

The game was released to lukewarm reception. Review aggregator website Metacritic, which assigns a normalized rating in the 0–100 range, calculated an average score of 66 out of 100 for the PlayStation 2 and 64 out of 100 for the Xbox, indicating "mixed or average reviews". GameSpot wrote, "Extinction does a good job of translating Aliens Versus Predator to an RTS, but it could have benefited from a few more months in development."

Brad Shoemaker from GameSpot praised the game for its diversity of mechanics between the races, stating, "the imaginative way in which the designers have differentiated the humans from the aliens from the predators is Extinction's strongest point". This was echoed by EGM's Joe Fielder, who stated that the differences made "each race's game worth playing." Several reviewers noted that the control scheme, while limited due to the differences between a gamepad and keyboard/mouse configuration, worked well for the game's mechanics.

In a negative review, Eurogamer's Tom Bradwell criticized the game for its AI, visuals, and balance problems. AI issues were pointed out by several reviewers. The short length of the campaign was criticized by several reviewers, many of which said there was not enough content in the game. IGN's Jeremy Dunham described the game as "terribly underwhelming."

== See also ==
- List of Alien, Predator, and Alien vs. Predator games
