= Alien (1984 video game) =

1984 strategy/adventure video game

- Commodore 64 box art
- Developer: Concept Software
- Publisher: Argus Press Software
- Designers: Paul Clansey (C64); John Heap (ZX); Garry Hughes (CPC)
- Platforms: Commodore 64, ZX Spectrum, Amstrad CPC
- Release: Commodore 64: NA: 1984; EU: 1984; ZX Spectrum: EU: 1984; Amstrad CPC: EU: 1985
- Genres: Strategy, adventure
- Mode: Single-player

Alien is a 1984 strategy/adventure video game based on the 1979 film of the same name, developed by Concept Software and published by Argus Press Software for the Commodore 64 and ZX Spectrum. It was later ported to the Amstrad CPC in 1985.

== Gameplay ==
Alien is an omniscient menu driven game. The player is put in charge of all of the crew members of the Nostromo. The game starts with one of the crew members being killed by the alien, which mirrors the death of Kane when he gives birth to the alien in the movie. The player moves the characters around on a map-grid representation of the ship as they search for the alien. Littered around the map are various objects that are useful such as nets, incinerators, pistols, and oxygen tanks. The player can order one of the crew members to pick up such objects and use them when needed.

Based on the current situation, the emotional status of the crewmen can change. Their emotional status can range from confident, stable, uneasy, shaken, hysterical, and broken. This means that the crew members will not always obey the player's orders and can be frozen by fear or unwillingness to enter a hazardous situation. Ordering characters to pick up weapons can positively affect their emotional status and make them more likely to follow orders. Sending a character off alone can negatively affect their emotional status, causing them to perform poorly. Furthermore, like in the film, one of the crew members is secretly an android and he will turn on the other crew. When the crew is reduced to three there is the option of activating the ship's self-destruct sequence and escaping in the Narcissus.

== Reception ==
Alien received a mixed reception from critics. The CRASH review overall verdict declared: "An excellent game — should keep you going for weeks. Hitchcock would have loved it." The three Your Spectrum reviewers gave it a positive review with the scores of 3/5, 4/5, and 5/5, respectively. On the other hand, Computer & Video Games reviewer gave the C64 version an averaged score of only 11/40, opining the game was a poor adaptation of the film and a "sad disappointment, with appalling graphics, sickly colours, and very little action." Retrospectively, Stephen Kleckner of Thunderbolt wrote positively about the game, including it in his "must-play" list of Alien titles.

== See also ==
- List of Alien, Predator, and Alien vs. Predator games
