= Aliens Versus Predator (1999 video game) =

- Developers: Rebellion Developments; Logicware (Mac OS X)
- Publishers: Fox Interactive; MacPlay (Mac OS X); Rebellion Developments (Classic 2000)
- Director: Chris Miller
- Producer: Vivian Barad
- Programmer: Kevin Floyer-Lea
- Artist: Marco Bertoldo
- Composer: Rich Ragsdale
- Platforms: Windows; Mac OS; Mac OS X
- Release: Windows: NA: 13 May 1999; EU: 25 June 1999; NA: 28 March 2000 (Gold); EU: 28 July 2000 (Gold); WW: 15 January 2010 (Classic 2000); Mac OS, Mac OS X October 19, 2001 (Gold)
- Genre: First-person shooter
- Modes: Single-player, multiplayer

Aliens Versus Predator is a 1999 first-person shooter video game developed by Rebellion Developments and published by Fox Interactive for Microsoft Windows, Mac OS, and Mac OS X. It is a part of the Alien and Predator crossover franchise, Alien vs. Predator. A sequel, Aliens Versus Predator 2, was developed by Monolith Productions and released by Sierra in 2001.

== Gameplay ==
Like the 1994 Alien vs Predator game for the Atari Jaguar, Aliens Versus Predator offers three separate campaigns, each playable as a separate species: Alien, Predator, or human Colonial Marine. Each player character has different objectives, abilities, and weapons. The single-player campaign presents the player with a conventional series of levels to progress through that are designed around the abilities of each character.

As the Colonial Marine the player uses a number of weapons to combat Aliens and Predators. The marine wears armor for protection and uses an image intensifier and flares to improve visibility in dark areas.

When playing as the Predator the player uses a variety of weapons from the Predator films such as wrist blades, a smart disc, and shoulder-mounted energy cannon. The Predator is the most durable of the three player characters and can survive falls from greater heights than the human. The player can use a cloaking device to become invisible and several different modes of vision to detect enemies, including an infrared vision mode and a mode sensitive to electrical systems.

As an Alien the player can explore most of the game's environments freely, even climbing across walls and ceilings. The Alien has no weapons, however, using its claws, tail, and jaws to attack enemies. The screen is distorted into a fisheye lens effect to reflect the Alien's field of view. The player can also use a form of echolocation in dark areas and can detect pheromones to discern human or Predator enemies. The Alien can drop from any height without injury and is the fastest of the three player characters.

Several bonus levels allow each player character access to portions of the missions of the other characters. To allow the marine and Predator characters to traverse through the areas of the Alien missions, the player is supplied with a jet pack for the marine and a grappling hook for the Predator.

== Plot ==
The storylines of the three player characters are independent of one another. As an Alien the player must defend the Alien hive from human marines, then stow away on an evacuating spacecraft and reach the marines' ship, the Ferarco. When the Ferarco's self-destruct system is activated, the player must reach the escape shuttle, which takes them to Gateway Station from Aliens (1986). Here the player explores the station and battles more marines, reaching a ship departing for Earth. Before boarding the ship the player battles two Predators, after which the Alien enters the Earth-bound shuttle.

When playing as the Colonial Marine, the player begins at a research station on LV-426 built to study the derelict spacecraft where the Nostromo crew first encountered the Alien eggs in the film Alien (1979). Aliens attack and the player must fight their way through the research facility, the derelict ship, and an adjoining colony. Next the player explores the atmosphere processing station and shuts down its cooling valves in order to cause an explosion which will wipe out the Aliens. The player character escapes in a drop ship and travels to Odobenus Station in orbit above the planetoid, to battle more Aliens, Predators, facehuggers, and cybernetically-enhanced Aliens until reaching the spaceship Tyrargo. Aboard the ship the player battles more enemies including an Alien/Predator hybrid and "praetorian" Aliens. The player then battles an Alien queen, defeating it by expelling it through the airlock.

The Predator character's storyline visits three different planets, beginning with the player hunting marines in order to recover a captured Predator ship and its occupant from a human military base. Aliens are accidentally released in the base and the player discovers that the humans have created an Alien/Predator hybrid by implanting the captured Predator with an Alien embryo. The player defeats the hybrid, triggers the facility's self-destruct mechanism, and escapes in the Predator ship. The player next visits Fiorina "Fury" 161, the prison planet that is the setting of Alien 3 (1992), where more Aliens and marines are battled. Finally the player visits a marine-controlled Alien habitat, battling cybernetically-enhanced Aliens, "praetorian" Aliens, and finally the Alien queen.

== Development and release ==
Aliens Versus Predator was developed by Rebellion Developments and published by Fox Interactive. It was announced in 1995 for release during the 1997 Christmas season on the PlayStation, Sega Saturn, and Microsoft Windows. However, the PC version was pushed back to 1999, while the Saturn and PlayStation versions were scrapped altogether, though the PlayStation was showcased in an early state during E3 1997. The Saturn version was not displayed at the show, though Rebellion was still planning a release for the system at the time. A version for the Dreamcast was also in development but never released.

An expansion pack titled Millennium Expansion Pack was released in 2000. It adds nine levels for single- and multiplayer, the ability to save within levels and new weapons for the marine. A compilation package titled Aliens Versus Predator: Gold Edition was also released in 2000. It contains the main game and the expansion. An Apple Macintosh version, for OS X and classical Mac OS, based on the Gold Edition was released by MacPlay in 2001. A version for Game Boy Advance was to be developed and published by Ubisoft, but eventually canceled.

The mission briefings in the original version of the game were acted by professional actors, however, the development team felt that their acting didn't provide the sense of urgency required. New versions of the briefings were made for the gold edition featuring members of the team.

=== Source code release ===
In 2001, on end-of-support and end-of-life of the game, Rebellion Developments released the game's source code and tools to public to allow the game community further support of the game. Following the source code release, the game was unofficially ported to Linux and hosted at icculus.org in 2001, Xbox in 2009 and for PlayStation Vita in 2020.

=== Re-release ===
On 15 January 2010, after several years of commercial unavailability, Aliens Versus Predator was commercially re-released under the title Aliens Versus Predator Classic 2000. This version of the game has been updated to work on modern computers, as well as support for the Xbox 360 controllers. Moreover, this release includes all the levels from the Gold Edition and the extra content of the Millennium Expansion Pack. Supporting only single player initially, multiplayer functionality has since been added. This release can be purchased either through Valve's Steam digital distribution service, through Green Man Gaming, or through GOG.com where it started as a free giveaway. A patch released on 19 January 2010 added proper widescreen support, optional unlimited saves, a locked frame rate, mouse improvements, and other updates to the game. At one point it was available through the now-defunct game streaming service OnLive.

== Reception ==
Reception

Aggregate score
| Aggregator | Score |
|---|---|
| GameRankings | 84% |

Review scores
| Publication | Score |
|---|---|
| AllGame | 4/5 (PC); 4/5 (Mac) |
| CNET Gamecenter | 6/10 |
| Computer Gaming World | 3/5 |
| Game Informer | 8.5/10 |
| GameFan | 90% |
| GamePro | 4/5 |
| GameRevolution | A− |
| GameSpot | 8.3/10 |
| GameSpy | 60% |
| GameZone | 9.9/10 |
| IGN | 8/10 |
| Next Generation | 4/5 |
| PC Accelerator | 8/10 |
| PC Gamer (US) | 79% |

Aliens Versus Predator received favorable reviews according to the review aggregation website GameRankings. IGN praised the game for allowing the player to play three different characters, each with a unique game-play element, and for being "fun and terrifying at the same time". GamePro cited the lack of a save feature as a major flaw, but praised the "splendid graphics, perfect sound effects, multiple vision modes, and ambiance" and citing it as "the most frightening game since Half-Life". The Adrenaline Vault cited the lack of depth in the story as a major flaw but praised the immersive atmosphere describing a moment of being attacked by a facehugger in the game as being "in these moments...the greatest game I had ever played". Edge gave it a score of eight out of ten, saying, "Equally, while AvP lacks the glossiness of its peers (Unreal, Half-Life, etc.) [...] the fabulously horrific, tense, and uniquely skewed action will doubtless be enough to make it a film favourite with those PC gamers who possess an insatiable appetite for firstperson [sic] thrills." Next Generation called it "a totally absorbing, even terrifying, experience. It's a shame that the engine didn't have the graphical clout of, say, an Unreal, or some more inventive level design, but it's fine for creating an atmosphere, a commodity it oozes at every step, making it one of the most memorable gaming experiences you're likely to survive."

Nathna Smith of Computer Games Strategy Plus gave the game four stars out of five, calling it "a revolutionary game, the kind that curmudgeonly critics dream of when criticizing the genre as stale." However, he gave the Gold Edition three stars, saying, "Deciding whether or not to buy this game is really a no-brainer. If you enjoyed the single player game only to put it away, the gold edition is just a waste. If you only play multiplayer (or, possibly, Skirmish mode) then you can purchase the new bits for $9.99. While it can't compensate for the lack of a user/developer community, it more than doubles the number of levels available (from seven to 16)."

For the 1999 awards given out by Level, Aliens Versus Predator ultimately won in the "First Person Shooter" category. Aliens Versus Predator was nominated for PC PowerPlay's "Best Sound FX", "Best Enemy", and "Best Firstperson [sic] Shooter (Single Player)" awards, all of which went to Half-Life. Aliens Versus Predator was also a runner-up in PC Format's "Best Shoot 'em Up Game" category, which was ultimately won by Quake III Arena.

== Sequel ==
A sequel called Aliens Versus Predator 2 was developed by Monolith Productions and released by Sierra in 2001. It once again comprised distinct campaigns for each of the three playable species, but this time the plots of each were aligned within a common narrative, and the campaigns directly intersected at several points.

== See also ==
- List of Alien, Predator, and Alien vs. Predator games
