= Aliens the Board Game =

Board game

Aliens the Board Game is a wargame by the now-defunct company Leading Edge Games based on the events in the 1986 film Aliens. It was first published in 1989 and reprinted in 2001. Players assume the roles of the Marines from the film and must fight through the five encounters with the aliens shown in the film.

== Scenarios ==
The five scenarios are as follows: 'The Reactor', 'The Dropship', 'Operations', 'Rescue Newt' and 'Ripley vs. the Alien Queen'. Each of these represents a different part of the film, with the outcome of each scenario affects the next.

The Reactor: This represents the sequence in which the marines are ambushed by the aliens inside the Thermonuclear Reactor. The marines are underequipped, due to the loss of their Pulse Rifle magazines. Their objective is to reach the Armoured Personnel Carrier which is waiting outside. Marines used in this mission's standard set-up are: Apone, Hicks, Vasquez, Drake, Wierzbowski, Dietrich, Hudson, Crowe and Frost.

The Dropship: This represents the segment of the film where the two dropship pilots are killed, causing the dropship to crash. If the marines lose this scenario, they continue as normal; If they win, they may elect to leave immediately, thus winning; or they may continue on with extra ammunition and access to the marines Ferro and Spunkmeyer. Standard set-up for this scenario uses the marines Ferro and Spunkmeyer.

The Aliens Boardgame Expansion also featured three more battles: "The Rescue of Newt", "Marine Assault", and the "Hunt for the Queen".

== Reception ==
James Wallis reviewed Aliens for Games International magazine, and gave it a rating of 3 out of 10, and stated that "This is a badly designed game, badly written with a very obvious built-in obsolescence and does not begin to justify its price. I find it said that it's on a subject popular outside gaming circles and is thus likely to put off many potential gamers before they've really had a chance to start."

Jim Foster reviewed Alien Boardgame in White Wolf #27 (June/July, 1991), rating it a 3 out of 5 and stated that "while the Aliens Boardgame is frantically fun to play and moderately addictive (the game tends to make one want to see the film and vice versa), the holding power is not enough to justify the rather steep purchase price. As it is, it seems that the price has been padded by several items that are essentially useless unless you fork over additional cash to obtain the supplement. Still, for the diehard Aliens fan that's too impatient to wait for the RPG, this may be the game for you." Foster also reviewed the Aliens Boardgame Expansion, rating it a 3 out of 5 and stated that "if you have the basic game and enjoyed it, you'll probably get a good amount of playing fun out of this one."

== Reviews ==
- Challenge #45
