= Alien vs Predator (SNES video game) =

1993 video game

- North American box art
- Developer: Jorudan
- Publishers: JP: IGS; NA/EU: Activision
- Producer: Tom Sloper
- Designers: Mitoshi Asakawa; Y. Furusawa
- Programmers: Fumihiro Sugiura; Mitoshi Asakawa; Yoshiaki Tejima
- Artists: Hisaya Yabusaki; Katsunori Nakabayashi; Mitsuru Ishida
- Composer: Tenpei Sato
- Platform: Super Nintendo Entertainment System
- Release: JP: 8 January 1993; NA: September 1993; EU: November 1993
- Genre: Beat 'em up
- Mode: Single-player

Alien vs Predator (Note: Also known as Aliens vs. Predator (Japanese: エイリアンvs.プレデター, Hepburn: Eirian vs. Puredetā) in Japan.) is a 1993 beat 'em up video game for Super Nintendo Entertainment System, developed by Jorudan and published by Information Global Service in Japan and by Activision internationally. An arcade game of the same title was released by Capcom eight months later, but the two games are different and their storylines are unrelated to each other.

== Gameplay ==
Gameplay screenshot

Alien vs Predator is a beat 'em up video game in which the player controls a Predator and must advance through various stages killing all of the Aliens. The player character may become temporarily invisible and may charge their energy weapons to destroy all onscreen enemies at once.

== Story ==
The game is set on the planet Vega 4 in the city of New Shanghai. A work crew performing underground construction discovers a colony of Aliens which attack them and then quickly moved to the surface. The city is quickly overcome by the Aliens, but the citizens send out a distress signal to Earth which is also received by a passing Predator ship. The Predators decide to hunt the Aliens on Vega 4, seeing them as challenging prey.

The player battles through six stages, fighting various types of Aliens and bosses. Many of the boss enemies are Aliens which have gestated in different types of animals and thus demonstrate characteristics of those animals. These include an aquatic Alien that emerges from a dolphin, a primate-like Alien gestated in an ape, a winged Alien gestated in a bat, and a snake-like Alien. After battling the Aliens on Vega 4 the player Predator travels to the Orion Nebula for the final stage and battles the Alien queen.

== Development and release ==
Alien vs Predator was developed by Jorudan, who had previously worked on games such as Xardion and Musya, with Activision producer Tom Sloper overseeing its creation. Both Mitoshi Asakawa and Y. Furusawa serving as designers while Fumihiro Sugiura, Yoshiaki Tejima and Mitoshi Asakawa worked as programmers. Hisaya Yabusaki, Yasuhiko Kikuchi, Kozo Igarashi, Nobuki Kimishima, Katsunori Nakabayashi, Mitsuru Ishida, Takanori Wada and Y. Arai were responsible for the pixel art. The soundtrack was composed by Tenpei Sato. Other members also collaborated in its making. Both Rebellion Developments co-founder Jason Kingsley and former Atari Corporation producer James "Purple" Hampton have stated in recent interviews that a port was planned for the Atari Jaguar, but Hampton felt it did not represent the franchise's universe and characters properly, resubmitting the project to both 20th Century Fox and Activision into a first-person shooter instead. According to Tom Sloper, conversions for the Sega Mega Drive and PC were also under development by Realtime Associates but both versions were ultimately scrapped by Activision, who were unhappy with their production.

Alien vs Predator for the Super Nintendo was first released in Japan by Information Global Service on January 8, 1993. The game was then released by Activision in North America in September 1993 and later in Europe on November of the same year. The Japanese version, titled Aliens vs. Predator, has several gameplay differences compared to the international version such as the Predator moving slower, though players can make him run by tapping the direction button twice and sporting an orange color, whereas the Predator in the international version moves faster but is unable to run and sports a brown color, as well as the charging meter for the player's energy weapon being shorter. The Japanese version includes a two-player versus mode in which one player controls a Predator and the other controls an Alien; this mode is absent from the international release.

== Reception ==
Reception

Review scores
Publication	Score
Famitsu	6/10, 5/10, 6/10, 5/10
GamesMaster	15%
Hyper	71/100
Mega Fun	33%
Official Nintendo Magazine	49%
Super Play	28%
Total!	4-
Video Games (DE)	63%
VideoGames & Computer Entertainment	4/10
Control	46%
Electronic Games	86%
Hippon Super!	5/10
Marukatsu Super Famicom	6/10, 6/10, 6/10, 6/10
N-Force	39/100
Nintendo Game Zone	35/100
SNES Force	39%
Super Action	59%
The Super Famicom	58/100
Super Gamer	57%
Super Pro	JP: 54/100, PAL: 57/100
Consolemania	69/100
Game Power	JP: 39%, PAL: 50%

Alien vs Predator on the SNES garnered generally unfavorable reviews from critics.

== See also ==
- List of Alien, Predator, and Alien vs. Predator games
