= Alien vs. Predator (soundtrack) =

Alien vs. Predator (Original Motion Picture Soundtrack)

Soundtrack album by Harald Kloser
- Released: August 9, 2004 (iTunes); August 31, 2004 (Audio CD)
- Studios: AIR Lyndhurst, London; Smecky Music Studios, Prague
- Genres: Orchestral; Film score
- Length: 38:03
- Labels: Varèse Sarabande; Fox Music
- Producer: Robert Townson

Harald Kloser soundtrack chronology
The Day After Tomorrow (2004)	Alien vs. Predator (2004)	10,000 BC (2008)

Professional ratings
Review scores
Source	Rating
Allmusic	3.5/5 stars

Alien vs. Predator (Original Motion Picture Soundtrack) is the official soundtrack album of the 2004 science fiction film Alien vs. Predator. Composed by Austrian Harald Kloser, Kloser was chosen by the film's director Paul W. S. Anderson, as he was an enthusiastic fan of the series. The score is completely orchestral and was released on August 9, 2004 on iTunes and on August 31, 2004 on Audio CD and Compact Cassette by Varèse Sarabande and Fox Music.

== Reviews ==
The soundtrack received mixed reviews from critics. Mike Brennan thought it "lacks the ingenuity of the previous trilogy (Alien) and the Predator scores, which all shared a strong sense of rhythm in place of thematic content. Kloser throws in some interesting percussion cues ("Antarctica" and "Down the Tunnel"), but more as a sound effect than a consistent motif." John Fallon of JoBlo.com compared it to character development in the movie, "too generic to completely engage or leave a permanent impression." James Christopher Monger of AllMusic awarded the album 3.5 out of 5, and thought Kloser introduced electronic elements well, and called "Alien vs. Predator Main Theme" a, "particularly striking and serves as a continuous creative source for the composer to dip his baton in".

== Track listing ==
No.	Title	Length
1.	"1904 (Note: The track "1904" was heard only on the film's unrated edition; not in the film's theatrical version.)"	1:16
2.	"Alien vs. Predator Main Theme"	3:29
3.	"Antarctica"	2:11
4.	"Bouvetøya Island"	2:09
5.	"Down the Tunnel"	1:02
6.	"Hanging Bodies"	1:46
7.	"Southern Lights"	1:39
8.	"Predator Space Ship"	1:12
9.	"The Pyramid"	1:11
10.	"Temple"	1:10
11.	"Dark World"	2:56
12.	"History of the World"	3:20
13.	"Alien Fight"	3:14
14.	"I Need This"	1:45
15.	"Weyland's End"	0:56
16.	"Alien Queen"	1:36
17.	"Showdown"	3:23
18.	"The End....or Maybe Not"	3:31
Total length:		38:03

== Selected credits ==
- Conductor [Score], Orchestrated By [Score] – James Brett
- Edited By [Assistant Music Editor] – Matt Robertson
- Edited By [Supervising Music Editor] – Andy Glen
- Executive Producer – Robert Townson
- Mastered By [Mastering Engineer] – Patricia Sullivan Fourstar
- Music By – Harald Kloser
- Music By [Additional] – James Brett, Thomas Schobel, Thomas Wanker
- Orchestrated By [Additional] – Marcus Trump, Matt Dunkley
- Programmed By [Sequence Programming By] – Matt Robertson, Thomas Schobel, Thomas Wanker
- Recorded By [Score], Mixed By [Score] – Geoff Foster
- Supervised By [Music Supervised For Twentieth Century Fox By] – Michael Knobloch
