= Predator 2 (1990 video game) =

- Konami box cover
- Developers: Oxford Mobius (MS-DOS); Arc Developments
- Publishers: Image Works; Konami; Mirrorsoft
- Designer: Paul Walker
- Programmers: Julian Scott (Amiga, ST)
- Artists: Paul Walker; Jon Harrison
- Platforms: Amiga, Amstrad CPC, Atari ST, Commodore 64, MS-DOS, ZX Spectrum
- Release: 1991
- Genre: Rail shooter
- Mode: Single-player

Predator 2 is a 1990 rail shooter video game developed by Oxford Mobius and Arc Developments and published in 1990 by Image Works, Konami and Mirrorsoft for MS-DOS, Amiga, Amstrad CPC, Atari ST, Commodore 64, and ZX Spectrum. It is based on the film of the same title.

== Gameplay ==
Amiga gameplay

== Plot ==
The plot of the game follows the plot of the movie in which the player assumes the role of Lieutenant Mike Harrigan as he fights the Jamaican Posse, Colombian Cartel, and the Predator himself.

== Development ==
The Amiga, Atari ST, and MS-DOS versions of Predator 2, by Arc Developments, were started in July 1990 and released by Image Works in the Spring of 1991. A December 1990 issue of British gaming magazine The One contained an interview with team members. The majority of the game's development was to be completed in five months. Image Works initially requested that Predator 2 have five levels; the compromise was four, with the first level double the length of the others.

Input from 20th Century Fox, the copyright holder of Predator, led to content restrictions upon Predator 2; Paul Walker, Predator 2's designer and graphic artist, stated that they have to "approve all graphics", and further expressed that Fox disallowed death and blood, which Walker described as "impossible" due to the content of the film. Walker stated that these restrictions were due to Fox marketing the game to a younger audience, and said that "The film's all blood everywhere, but they say 'It's a kiddies game, we don't want killing in there'." These limitations were a complication in Predator 2's development, but the team came to a solution wherein characters "fall over backwards and disappear" when defeated, as opposed to dying. Another complication was that the likenesses of actors in the film had to be approved by their agents. To keep interference at a minimum, Arc Developments kept a list of actors who 'didn't care' about their likeness in the game, as well as a list of those who did; Danny Glover, the actor who played Harrigan, had to approve his likeness in Predator 2 whenever new sprites were made.

Predator 2's graphics were created on a Compaq 386 Despro running Windows 3.0 and the MS-DOS version of Deluxe Paint II Enhanced. The game was also programmed on PC, and this consistency allowed the team to transfer data between computers through serial or floppy disks. Walker expressed that Windows 3's ability to multitask was useful, allowing him to work on the graphics of different versions of the game simultaneously in different GUI windows.

== Reception ==
Computer Gaming World praised the Amiga version's graphics but called the Commodore 64 version "extremely disappointing", and criticized the lack of a save game option as "extremely frustrating". In Germany, Predator was put on the 'German index' by the Federal Department for Media Harmful to Young Persons, which made it illegal to sell or make the game available to minors in Germany, as well as making it illegal to advertise the game in any form.
