= Alien (Avalon Hill) =

1982 strategy video game

- Developer: Avalon Hill
- Publisher: Avalon Hill
- Platform: Apple II
- Release: 1982
- Genre: Turn-based strategy
- Mode: Single-player

Alien (also known as The Alien) is a turn-based strategy game that was created by Avalon Hill in 1982. It borrows heavily from concepts in the 1979 film Alien.

Title screen

== Gameplay ==
The Alien is a game in which the crew of a ship must deal with a hostile alien species.

Gameplay proceeds in turns and requires an analogue joystick to play. Actions are selected through a series of menus which are only accessible by holding the controller in varying degrees between up, centre and down. Using a digital controller with only absolute up, centre and down positions will mean that only a few options are available.

In Alien, the player controls a crew of seven people who are on a spaceship with an alien that is running loose. The object of the game is to capture or kill the alien. The crew can employ stun guns or lethal weapons to try to neutralise the alien. As a last resort, the player can use a self-destruct mechanism in the ship and the remaining crew can flee in an escape pod.

Ship's schematics

The game has two screens: a text screen and a map screen. Each turn has three phases - one phase uses the map screen and the other two use the text screens. The first phase of each turn takes place on the text screen. Every turn begins with the message: Sensors indicate movement of life forms within the ship. Play then moves to each room where a crewmember is present. During the text-screen phases, the player is given a description of the room and which crewmembers are in it. This also includes objects and creatures in the room. In this mode, the player can interact with objects in the room, such as attempting to capture an animal or attacking an alien. During the second phase of the game, which takes place on the map screen, the player can move the crew around the ship and have them drop and take items. The third phase returns the player to the text screen.

Although the player issues commands to each crewmember, the characters in the game will not necessarily obey those commands. For example, a crewmember may refuse to attack the alien or to enter a restricted area. If the player instructs a crewmember to attack the alien early in the game, the player may also receive the message regulations forbid killing of creatures which can be controlled otherwise.

The alien will attempt to kill any of the crew that encounter it. If the alien kills a crewmember, the remaining crew will re-assemble on the bridge to "discuss the situation". The alien will also metamorphose during the course of the game and becomes more lethal as it changes. Eventually, the alien will also begin to multiply.

== Reception ==
Johnny Wilson reviewed the game for Computer Gaming World, and stated that "'The Alien' is an interesting strategy game which will take many hours of gaming to master. Variables in number and locations of aliens, rate of metamorphosis, and identity (or existence) of the android crew member offer the possibility of an above-average shelf life."
