= Shuttlecraft =

Smaller vessel that is launched from a mother ship

A shuttlecraft, also known as a shuttle spacecraft, shuttle ship, drop shuttle, drop spacecraft, or dropship, is a type of spacecraft described in theory and science fiction. Serving the same purpose as a ship's tender, it is a smaller vessel that is launched from a mother ship, and has the ability to transport people or cargo between ships, or to and from a planet's surface without being damaged or destroyed. It has a secondary purpose as an evacuation ship if the mother ship is destroyed. While the Space Shuttle was envisioned to make this type of craft a reality and reduce the cost of going into space, it ultimately failed in its goal and expendable launch systems remained a more cost-effective option.

== Examples ==
The idea of a shuttle craft used for space travel first appeared in The Great Romance (1881), where it was called the Midge and was used to explore Venus. These types of craft later became a mainstay of science fiction. The use of the word "shuttle" was taken from nautical terminology.

The idea was later used in Star Trek, where they are called shuttlecraft. Similar craft are also used by the Visitors in V, and a more military-styled version known as the UD-4 Cheyenne-class dropship was used in Aliens (1986), popularizing the use of the term to refer to shuttles that serve the same purpose as military transport aircraft. The dropship concept was a major plot point in the 2009 film District 9.

Usage in video games includes the drop shuttles from Mass Effect and the Pelicans and dropships from Halo, as well as the Terran dropship unit in the StarCraft series.

Shuttlecraft have seen widespread use by all the major factions in the Star Wars franchise. There are numerous variations on the concept within the Star Wars expanded universe, but the main uses include use as: drop-ships, boarding craft, assault landing craft, and as non-combat personnel transports.

== Hypothetical usage ==
The use of shuttle ships was proposed as a means for economical transport to Mars. People would ride a shuttle to a mother ship in orbit around the Sun, which would not need to slow down. This would increase the speed of travel from Earth to Mars, being able to transport hundreds of people at regular intervals.

== See also ==
- Lambda-class shuttle
