= List of Predator (franchise) characters =

This article lists characters and actors in the Predator franchise. The original series consists of five films, Predator (1987), Predator 2 (1990), Predators (2010), The Predator (2018), and Predator: Badlands (2025). One prequel Prey (2022) and one animated film Predator: Killer of Killers (2025), as well as the video games Predator: Concrete Jungle (2005) and Predator: Hunting Grounds (2020). The series revolves around mankind's deadly encounters with the Predators (Yautja).

== Overview ==
List indicators

This section includes characters who will appear or have appeared in the film series.

- An empty grey cell indicates the character was not in the film, or that the character's official presence has not yet been confirmed.
- ^{C} indicates a cameo role.
- ^{U} indicates an uncredited appearance.
- ^{V} indicates a voice-only role.

Predator cast
| Characters | Films | | | | | Video games | |
| Characters | Predator | Predator 2 | Predators | The Predator | Prey | Predator: Concrete Jungle | Predator: Hunting Grounds |
|---|---|---|---|---|---|---|---|
| Characters | 1987 | 1990 | 2010 | 2018 | 2022 | 2005 | 2020 |
=== Recurring cast and characters ===
| Predators | Kevin Peter Hall | Kevin Peter Hall | Derek Mears (classic) | Brian A. Prince (fugitive) | Dane DiLiegro | Aimée Leigh^{V} | Antonio Alvarez^{V} |
| Predators | Peter Cullen^{V} | Hal Rayle^{V} | Brian Steele (Falconer and Berserker) | Brian A. Prince (ultimate); Juan Pacheco^{V} | Dane DiLiegro | Sarah Brown^{V} | Antonio Alvarez^{V} |
| Predators | Peter Cullen^{V} | Hal Rayle^{V} | Carey L. Jones (tracker) | Brian A. Prince (ultimate); Juan Pacheco^{V} | Dane DiLiegro | Sarah Brown^{V} | Antonio Alvarez^{V} |
| Alan "Dutch" Schaefer | Arnold Schwarzenegger | Mentioned | Mentioned | Mentioned | | | Arnold Schwarzenegger^{V} |
| Anna Gonsalves | Elpidia Carrillo | Elpidia Carrillo^{C} | | | | | |
| El Scorpio / Guerilla | Henry Kingi^{U} | Henry Kingi | | | | | |
| King Willie | | Calvin Lockhart | | | | Arthur Burghardt^{V} | |
| Isabelle | | | Alice Braga | | | | Alice Braga^{V} |
| Sean H. Keyes | | | | Jake Busey | | | Jake Busey^{V} |
| Raphael Adolini | | Mentioned | | | Bennett Taylor | | |
| Scarface | | | | | | Jan Johns^{V} | Jan Johns^{V} |
=== Introduced in Predator ===
| Al Dillon | Carl Weathers | | | | | | Mentioned |
| Jorge "Poncho" Ramirez | Richard Chaves | | | | | | Mentioned |
| Mac Eliot | Bill Duke | | | | | | Mentioned |
| Blain Cooper | Jesse Ventura | | | | | | Mentioned |
| Billy Sole | Sonny Landham | | | | | | Mentioned |
| Rick Hawkins | Shane Black | | | | | | Mentioned |
| Homer L. Phillips | R. G. Armstrong | | | | | | Mentioned |
=== Introduced in Predator 2 ===
| Michael "Mike" R. Harrigan | | Danny Glover | | | | | Mentioned |
| Peter Jacob Keyes | | Gary Busey | | | | | Mentioned |
| Danny "Danny Boy" Archuleta | | Rubén Blades | | | | | |
| Leona Cantrell | | María Conchita Alonso | | | | | |
| Garber | | Adam Baldwin | | | | | |
| Jerry Lambert | | Bill Paxton | | | | | |
| Anthony "Tony" Pope | | Morton Downey Jr. | | | | | |
| Phil Heinemann | | Robert Davi | | | | | |
| Captain B. Pilgrim | | Kent McCord | | | | | |
=== Introduced in Predators ===
| Royce | | | Adrien Brody | | | | Mentioned |
| Edwin | | | Topher Grace | | | | Mentioned |
| Walter Stans | | | Walton Goggins | | | | Mentioned |
| Nikolai Mikhalovich Fedorov | | | Oleg Taktarov | | | | Mentioned |
| Hanzo Kamakami | | | Louis Ozawa Changchien | | | | Mentioned |
| Mombasa | | | Mahershala Ali | | | | Mentioned |
| Cuchillo | | | Danny Trejo | | | | Mentioned |
| Ronald Noland | | | Laurence Fishburne | | | | Mentioned |
=== Introduced in The Predator ===
| Cullen Yutani | | | | Françoise Yip | | | Mentioned |
| Quinn McKenna | | | | Boyd Holbrook | | | Mentioned |
| Casey Bracket | | | | Olivia Munn | | | Mentioned |
| Will Traeger | | | | Sterling K. Brown | | | Mentioned |
| Gaylord "Nebraska" Williams | | | | Trevante Rhodes | | | |
| Rory McKenna | | | | Jacob Tremblay | | | |
| Coyle | | | | Keegan-Michael Key | | | |
| Lynch | | | | Alfie Allen | | | |
| Nettles | | | | Augusto Aguilera | | | |
| Baxley | | | | Thomas Jane | | | |
| Emma McKenna | | | | Yvonne Strahovski | | | |
=== Introduced in Prey ===
| Naru | | | | | Amber Midthunder | | |
| Taabe | | | | | Dakota Beavers | | |
| Aruka | | | | | Michelle Thrush | | |
| Wasape | | | | | Stormee Kipp | | |
=== Introduced in Predator: Concrete Jungle ===
| Isabella Borgia MOTHER | | | | | | Tasia Valenza^{V} | |
| Lucretia Borgia | | | | | | Giselle Loren^{V} | |
| Bruno Borgia | | | | | | Fred Tatasciore^{V} | |
| El Hongo | | | | | | Armando Valdes-Kennedy^{V} | |
| Hunter Borgia | | | | | | David Sobolov^{V} | |
=== Introduced in Predator: Hunting Grounds ===
| Soldier | | | | | | | James Willems^{V} |

== Introduced in Predator (1987) ==
=== Dutch ===
Dutch Schaefer
- First appearance: Predator (1987)
- Last appearance: Predator: Hunting Grounds (2020)
- Created by: Jim Thomas; John Thomas
- Portrayed by: Arnold Schwarzenegger

In-universe information
- Full name: Alan Schaefer
- Nickname: Dutch
- Species: Human
- Gender: Male
- Occupation: Mercenary; Leader of a private military team
- Relatives: Schaefer (brother)
- Nationality: Austrian-American
- Title: Major
- Affiliation: US Army (formerly); Alan Schaefer's private military team
- Birth date: January 13, 1948

Major Alan "Dutch" Schaefer (Arnold Schwarzenegger) is the leader of the team and the protagonist of the first movie. Dutch is depicted as a highly skilled and experienced special forces operator. Schaefer and Dillon served together in Vietnam during the Battle of Huế. Schaefer is sent on a mission in Val Verde, under the belief that presidential cabinet members of Guatemala were kidnapped by guerrilla forces. After attacking the guerrilla's post, they discover that the men were actually CIA agents. It is also known that Dutch and his team fought in Afghanistan for a time as stated by Poncho. After the Predator kills all of Dutch's team and Dillon, and with Anna being rescued, he is the only man left in the jungle with the Predator. Using a knife and vines to fashion primitive weapons and traps including a spear (with the knife as the blade), and a bow with an explosive-tipped arrow made from a 40 mm grenade, he covers his body in mud after discovering the Predator sees in the infrared field, effectively making him invisible. Though the Predator falls victim to a number of Dutch's traps, they fail to kill. Eventually, the Predator catches him and the two fight hand to hand. Despite his impressive physique, Dutch is no match for the monster, only surviving when he manages to lure it into a trap where it is nearly crushed by a log. The badly injured Predator then activates a self-destruct device for its suicide and to kill Dutch, but Dutch escapes the blast radius just before detonation and is rescued by the rescue helicopter that saved Anna. Dutch is referenced in both Predator 2 and Predators. In the former, Keyes mentions that a creature identical to the one they are pursuing stalked and slaughtered Dutch's team in the jungle ten years prior, and in the latter, Isabelle says the creature they just saw matched the "detailed description" by the only survivor of the 1987 Guatemala mission. As a cyborg, Dutch also appears as one of the playable characters in the Alien vs. Predator arcade game, and 2020's Predator: Hunting Grounds, with Schwarzenegger reprising his role.

=== Dillon ===
Al Dillon (Carl Weathers) is a former teammate of Dutch and current CIA officer, sent along with Dutch's team for the mission. He and Dutch were comrades during the Vietnam War and saw heavy combat during the Battle of Huế. Having not served in the field for some time, Dillon nearly shows the team's position to the rebels while en route to the rebel camp in the jungle. He and the CIA have a secret agenda for the mission; the Army told Dutch that it was Guatemalan cabinet members that were kidnapped and needed to be rescued, but it was actually CIA agents, and also to discover what happened to American soldiers led by Jim Hopper (the leader of a team that previously tried to recover the CIA agents). Dillon and Dutch clash frequently when the latter realises that he and his men have been used, something Dillon is disdainful of. He insists on taking Anna with them, escorting her personally most of the time. He volunteers to go after Mac, who chased off after the Predator in a suicide revenge mission, knowing he is unlikely to live. He spots the Predator and starts shooting at it but the Predator shoots his arm off and he is impaled by the Predator and being the third-last victim of the Predator, his dying scream warns the others of the Predator's proximity. Dillon returned in a video game Mortal Kombat X (2015), as Al Dillon who is in form of the fighter Jax, also voiced by Weathers.

=== Anna ===
Anna Gonsalves (Elpidia Carrillo) is a guerrilla, captured by Dutch's troops following a battle with the rebels. She later tells them of a legend inspired by the Predators, of an "old demon" that during hot summers attacks people from violent areas who are later found skinned and hollowed. Anna is the only one to reach the rescue helicopter that later picks up Dutch. She is the only character other than Dutch to survive, mostly since the Predator never attacked her. After the extraction, she is seen aiding government agents in a video tape on Predator 2, showing the devastating after-effects of the Predator's self-destruct device to the U.S. Army.

=== Poncho ===
Jorge "Poncho" Ramirez (Richard Chaves) is a Chicano. He speaks fluent Spanish, for he can translate to his group for Anna when she speaks. Though not as physically imposing as his teammates, he is a competent and intelligent soldier with a sarcastic sense of humour, although his composure begins to crumble as the attacks increase. Poncho is the first to find Hawkins' remains. He is badly wounded when the Predator inadvertently uses one of the traps set by the commandos against them and a tree trunk slams into his waist after the Predator shot it to swing right at him. Poncho is the last victim of the Predator, shot in the neck as Anna and Dutch attempted to carry him to the helicopter. His weapon of choice is a grenade launcher.

=== Billy ===
Billy Sole (Sonny Landham), is a Native American. Billy is the first one to notice the Predator is hunting them. Throughout the film, it is alluded that Billy has a strong jungle sense. At several points during the film he feels the presence of the Predator and becomes spooked. Billy dies shortly after presenting a formal knife fight challenge to the Predator (he discarded all of his equipment before doing so), in order to buy Dutch, Poncho, and Anna more time to escape. The manner in which he is killed is unknown, but the Predator is later seen dragging Billy's body up a tree and placing him on a branch before removing his spine and skull as a trophy. Billy's laughter is mimicked in the Predator's dying scene as it activates its self-destruct device.

In August 2022, Bennett Taylor confirmed that the script for Prey revealed Billy to be the reincarnation of Taabe, a Comanche war chief and older brother of Naru who is ultimately killed by a Predator, portrayed by Dakota Beavers, reframing Billy's "last stand" with the Predator as being due to subconscious memories of a past life.

=== Blain ===
Blain Cooper (Jesse Ventura) fought alongside Mac in the Vietnam War and were the only members of their platoon to survive a night-long battle. He often chews tobacco, and wears a battered old cowboy hat. He dislikes Dillon and makes that clear on a helicopter ride by spitting on his boot. His weapon of choice is a modified minigun he calls "Ol' Painless", he also carries a submachine gun when he needs to be stealthy. As he is searching for Hawkins' body, the Predator shoots him through the chest with its plasma caster, killing him instantly.

=== Hawkins ===
Rick Hawkins (Shane Black) is the team's radio operator and technical expert. He tells sexual jokes (often badly to the point that he has to explain the punchline) and reads comic books. He uses a submachine gun as his main weapon. As he captures Anna trying to escape, Hawkins becomes the first on-screen victim of the Predator, presumably slashed to death by its blade. Apparently, the Predator eviscerates him in one swift motion, leaving behind a pile of his organs. The Predator takes his body, but leaves his pack and weapon, giving Dutch the first indication that what's following them isn't the rebels of the area.

=== Mac ===
Sergeant "Mac" Eliot (Bill Duke) is a close friend of Blain's; they served in Vietnam together and were the only two members of their platoon to make it out alive after a night-long battle. Both he and Blain are unfriendly towards Dillon. After Dillon lags behind and potentially makes their presence known, Mac threatens to kill him. He is the first to harm the Predator, by shooting him in revenge after Blain's death. He is also the first of the team to see the Predator (albeit in its camouflaged state). Enraged and saddened by the murder of Blain, he swears that he will avenge Blain's death. Later Mac and Dillon go after the Predator together, which kills Mac by shooting him in the head with its plasma caster. His lines, "Over here", "Turn around" and "Anytime" are mimicked by the Predator throughout the film, in a mocking fashion.

=== Hopper ===
James "Jim" Hopper was an old friend of Dutch. He was the leader of an experienced and well-armed unit of Green Berets. They were the first team sent to raid the rebel encampment, but were waylaid by the Predator. Dutch and his men find them hanging from trees with their skin ripped off and can only identify them by their dog tags. The novelization states that Hopper served with Dutch in black ops in Malaysia.

=== General Phillips ===
Major General Homer Phillips (R.G. Armstrong) sends Dutch's team on the mission. He is later seen in the rescue helicopter sent to get the team. Phillips appears in the Dark Horse Predator comics, where he forces Dutch's brother Detective Schaefer to help him with fighting Predators in exchange for telling him Dutch's fate. Phillips is last seen being interrogated by Schaefer under the threat of violence.

=== The "Jungle Hunter" Predator ===
The titular humanoid extraterrestrial (Kevin Peter Hall) is a member of a monster warrior race, the Yautja, which hunts aggressive members of other species for sport, uses active camouflage, a plasma weapon and can see in the infrared spectrum. It eventually kills every member of Dutch's team and then engages Dutch in a hand-to-hand fight, nearly killing him until Dutch traps it under a log. The Predator, however, commits suicide with a self-destruct device, though Dutch escapes the explosion.

== Introduced in Predator 2 (1990) ==
=== Mike Harrigan ===
Lieutenant Michael R. "Mike" Harrigan (Danny Glover) is an LAPD officer and the protagonist of the second movie, who while dealing with rival Jamaican and Colombian drug cartels, discovers that the Predator is killing members of both factions, as well as police officers. He is very stubborn, and often is conflicted by superior officers for he "never obeys orders", but his record for busting criminals keeps him on the force. Seeking vengeance for the death of his friend, Danny Archuleta, Harrigan ultimately defeats the Predator inside its ship using its own smart disc. He is then confronted by a group of other Predators, however, after seeing that their clan-mate was killed by Harrigan in a fair fight, the Predators allow him to leave, with their leader giving him an antique pistol from the 18th century as a marker of respect. Harrigan then barely escapes the tunnel where the ship is located as it lifts off, leaving the area burnt.

Harrigan appears again in the short story Drug War from the short story collection Predator: If It Bleeds. By 2022, Harrigan has retired and now serves as an advisor on gang violence for urban police forces across the world. In Rio de Janeiro, Harrigan is caught up in a rogue Predator's hunt, similar to the one he had been involved with. Harrigan and the local police injure the Predator, which is then taken by a group of other Predators to receive punishment for an unknown crime.

Later, it's revealed in Predator: Killer of Killers that he's held captive by a Yautja tribe in suspended animation alongside Ursa, Naru and Dutch.

=== Danny Archuleta ===
Sergeant Daniel "Danny Boy" Archuleta (Rubén Blades) is a part of Harrigan's team; he is apparently the long-time friend of Harrigan. He is later killed by the Predator while retrieving a suspicious spear tip the Predator left behind during a penthouse slaughter, being dragged into an air vent and gutted. The Predator later returns his collar (which he took as a trophy) to Harrigan as a symbol of respect.

=== Leona Cantrell ===
Detective Leona Cantrell (María Conchita Alonso) is an LAPD cop involved in the Jamaican-Colombian gang wars. On the way to meeting Harrigan via subway train, they notice a man being threatened with murder by a group of thugs. Lambert and Leona draw their weapons, only to notice all the doors have been shut tight, and the Predator which was on the roof of the train is now inside, killing the thugs and other armed citizens. After being ordered by Jerry to evacuate the people, she heads back only to find Jerry dead. The Predator attacks her, but just as it's about to kill her, it notices that she's pregnant. Seeing this, the Predator decides to spare Leona, allowing her to live, though the shock of the event causes her to pass out.

=== Peter Keyes ===
Special Agent Peter J. Keyes (Gary Busey) is a CIA agent leading a special task force investigating a supposed drug conspiracy; this is only a cover for his attempts to capture the Predator. His entire team is killed by the Predator while they are attempting to freeze him in a slaughterhouse for study, while Keyes is temporarily incapacitated by a glancing blow from the Predator's Plasma Caster. Moments before the Predator is about to kill Harrigan, Keyes, scarred on the left side of his face from the blast, viciously jumps in front of the Predator, attempting to freeze the creature as per his original mission. However, the Predator launches his smart disc at Keyes which bisects him. He is the father of Sean Keyes.

=== Garber ===
Garber (Adam Baldwin) is a member of Keyes' task force investigating a supposed drug conspiracy; this is only a cover for his attempts to capture the Predator. His entire team is killed by the Predator while they are attempting to freeze him for study in a slaughterhouse. He is one of the only four survivors of the team.

Garber appears again in the short story Drug War, from the short story collection Predator: If It Bleeds. By 2022, Garber has retired and now sells high tech weaponry. Garber engages a rogue Predator in a firefight with this weaponry, and is blown apart by the Predator's plasma-caster.

=== Jerry Lambert ===
Detective Jerry "The Lone Ranger" Lambert (Bill Paxton) is an LAPD cop, eventually transferred from another precinct into Metro Command. He is a comedic member of the team often telling bad jokes with Leona. During the Predator fight in the subway, he makes a stand by allowing other civilians as well as Leona to escape. He attacks the Predator, but the Predator quickly kills Lambert, and takes his skull as a trophy.

He was played by actor Bill Paxton, who also played William Hudson in the 1986 film, Aliens. This makes Paxton one of only 2 actors to portray two different characters from the Alien and the Predator franchises, respectively. The other being Lance Henriksen who played the android Executive Officer Bishop from Aliens; and who also appeared as Charles Bishop Weyland in Alien vs. Predator (2004).

=== King Willie ===
King Willie (Calvin Lockhart) is the boss of the Jamaican Voodoo Posse. He appears to be psychotic to a certain degree because of his voodoo beliefs, doing things such as ordering his men to remove the heart of a rival drug dealer. He is having the same problem with the Predator as Harrigan is. All that he knows at his meeting with Harrigan is that the Predator is from another world. When he sees the Predator at sight he says, "His foundation lie in the Holy Mountain. Selah", and draws his sword against the alien before his head is sliced off and his spine is torn out of his body for a trophy.

A similarly named character appears in Predator: Concrete Jungle as a gang leader in the futuristic Neonopolis, who, along with his entire gang, is killed by the Predator and flayed.

=== Tony Pope ===
Tony Pope (Morton Downey, Jr.) is a journalist, who reports the gruesome and murderous homicides left by the Predator. He is constantly harassed by the police for reporting at inappropriate times or interfering when least useful. When trying to ask Harrigan about the situation of the Predator's attack on a subway train, Harrigan angrily punches him unconscious.

=== El Scorpio ===
El Scorpio (Henry Kingi) is a member of the Colombian Scorpions, in a gang war with the Jamaican Voodoo posse. While in a firefight with the police, El Scorpio and other gang members take refuge inside an adjacent building containing a hidden armory. However, the Predator arrives and kills most of the gang, though El Scorpio escapes to the building's roof. He is then confronted by Harrigan, who shoots El Scorpio in his bullet-proof vest, causing him to fall from the building to his death.

Kingi had previously portrayed a guerrilla in the first film, later retroactively established to have been a younger El Scorpio.

=== The "City Hunter" Predator ===
Another Predator (Kevin Peter Hall) appears in Los Angeles 10 years later, hunting drug lords and then members of the LAPD when they interfere in its hunt. The Predator is eventually killed by Harrigan, who rams the Predator's throwing disc into its stomach during their fight inside the Predator's ship.

This Predator was designed to look more urban and hip than its predecessor. Design changes included tribal ornamentation on the forehead, which was made steeper and shallower, brighter skin colouration and a greater number of fangs.

== Introduced in Predator: Concrete Jungle (2005) ==
=== Isabella Borgia / MOTHER ===
Isabella Borgia / MOTHER (Tasia Valenza) is the system that runs the city of Neonopolis, formerly the queenpin of the Borgia crime family.

=== Lucretia Borgia ===
Lucretia Borgia (Giselle Loren) is the CEO of the Borgia Corporation and heir to the Borgia crime family.

=== Bruno Borgia ===
Bruno Borgia (Fred Tatasciore) is the one-time boss of the Borgia crime family in 1930s New Way City.

=== El Hongo ===
El Hongo (Armando Valdes-Kennedy) is a drug cartel leader working for the Borgia crime family.

=== Hunter Borgia ===
Hunter Borgia (David Sobolov) is the genetically altered son of Bruno and Isabella Borgia, changed by the blood of Scarface.

=== Ronin ===
Ronin is the silent honorable bodyguard of Lucretia Borgia, who with their two brethren allies themselves with Scarface after Lucretia is killed by her father.

== Introduced in Predators (2010) ==
=== Royce ===
Royce (Adrien Brody) is a former U.S. Special Operations Forces turned mercenary equipped with an AA-12 automatic shotgun with a drum mag, and a pistol as well as a machete. He realizes that he and others are on an alien game preserve planet, and are being hunted as game by some unknown hunters. Royce releases the Classic Predator for his help to start the ship in order to escape the planet. He disarms Edwin, paralyzes him, and booby-traps him with grenades and uses him as bait in a trap for the Berserker Predator. Royce disorients Berserker and after a violent fight, he defeats and decapitates it. He and Isabelle sit together by the remains of a fire, watching the sky as more humans and other aliens are being dropped into the jungle. Royce says to Isabelle that it is time to find a way off the planet, and they walk away into the jungle.

=== Isabelle ===
Isabelle A. Nissenbaum (Alice Braga) is an IDF black ops sniper armed with a large sniper rifle and a pistol. Out of the group, she is the only one with previous knowledge of the Predators, believing she is there as punishment for getting her spotter killed during her last mission. Isabelle and Edwin are captured by the final Super Predator, who throws them into a pit. She is paralyzed by Edwin after being cut with his scalpel covered in neurotoxin. She helps Royce out by shooting the Berserker Predator with her sniper rifle. Isabelle and Royce sit together by the remains of a fire, watching the sky as more humans and other aliens are being dropped into the jungle. Royce says to Isabelle that it is time to find a way off the planet, and they walk away into the jungle.

=== Edwin ===
Edwin (Topher Grace) is a seemingly innocent doctor. He falls behind as the group escapes and is saved by Nikolai after being noticed by a Predator. Edwin is crippled by a trap, trying to escape with Royce and Isabelle. Edwin and Isabelle are captured by the Berserker Predator, who throws them into a pit. Edwin temporarily paralyzes Isabelle by cutting her with his scalpel covered in neurotoxin and reveals that he is a psychopathic killer who wishes to stay on the planet to become like the Predators. After he attempts to paralyze Royce, Royce disarms him, paralyzes him, and booby-traps him with grenades and uses him as bait in a trap for the Berserker Predator.

=== Stans ===
Walter Stans (Walton Goggins) is a notorious and deadly death-row inmate from San Quentin State Prison. Being transferred to the planet during imprisonment, he is the only member of the hunted group besides Edwin who is not armed with a firearm (he is instead armed with a shank throughout the film). After being wounded by a plasma-caster shot from the Berserker Predator, he then sacrifices himself in a suicide attack to buy the other survivors time to escape. Stans taunts the Predator before having his skull and spine removed by the monster.

=== Nikolai ===
Nikolai Mikhalov Fedorav (Oleg Taktarov) is a Russian Spetsnaz commando during the Second Chechen War equipped with an M134 minigun (which is later destroyed by Berserker's plasma-caster) and a pistol. He fires at Royce and Cuchillo when he first meets them, thinking they are the enemy. He has two children back home. After saving Edwin from the Tracker Predator, Nikolai gets shot in the back by Tracker's plasma-caster. As Tracker impales Nikolai and lifts him from the ground, the Russian sacrifices himself using explosives to destroy both himself and Tracker.

=== Hanzo ===
Hanzo Kawakami (Louis Ozawa Changchien) is an Inagawa-kai yakuza enforcer, wielding a pistol and later a samurai katana that he finds in Noland's hideout. Hanzo does not speak much throughout the film, and when asked why, he responds, "Because I talk too much" and showed that he is missing the ring and pinkie fingers of his left hand, revealing he had committed yubitsume. Hanzo engages the Falconer Predator in single combat towards the end of the film, resulting in both of their deaths.

He is mentioned by his brother Eiji Kawakami in the crossover audiobook series Aliens vs. Predators: Ultimate Prey.

=== Mombasa ===
Mombasa (Mahershala Ali) is a Sierra Leone RUF death squad officer who uses an AK-47 and a pistol. Stans and he are shown having a dislike for each other throughout the film. Mombasa is the first one to notice that the Predators are hunting them. He is killed when he is stabbed through the chest by the Predators' trap while in their camp.

=== Cuchillo ===
Cuchillo (Danny Trejo) is the Mexican Los Zetas drug cartel enforcer armed with two MP5 sub machine guns and a pistol. After he and the other members engaged in a battle with the Hell-Hounds, he became cornered and killed. His body is later used unsuccessfully as bait by the Predators.

=== Noland ===
Ronald Noland (Laurence Fishburne) is a stranded U.S. Air Cavalry Soldier dropped on the planet several years, possibly decades ago. Unlike most other prey, he has managed to keep himself alive by staying in hiding most of the time, and hunting and scavenging whatever he can when possible. During his time on the planet, Noland has become quite a hunter himself, using scavenged Predator technology as his weaponry. The long time in solitude has however driven him somewhat insane; he behaves oddly and has developed an invisible friend he has conversations with. After making contact with the recent arriving humans, he takes them to his hiding place and explains to them what they are dealing with and why they are on the planet. Later on, after an unsuccessful attempt to murder the group by lighting a fire to smoke poison them (in order to scavenge their items), he encounters the Tracker Predator while fleeing his hideout and attempts to fight it with an axe, only to be blasted into pieces and a cloud of blood by Tracker's plasma-caster.

=== River Ghost ===
River Ghost (Carey Jones) is a humanoid-like alien creature, which, like humans, are hunted by the Super Predators on the Game Preserve Planet. It is later killed by Noland, wearing scavenged Predator equipment.

The design of the creature was inspired by the original, unused design of the Predator that was created for the first movie: a cyclops-like being with the ability to become invisible.

=== Hell-Hounds ===
Hell-Hounds, also known as Predator Hounds or Predator Dogs, are dog-like alien creatures controlled by the Tracker Predator to flush out the prey, the same way as a hunter would use dogs to flush out their quarry. The Tracker Predator has a whistle device that is used to call the hounds back to their master to prevent them from doing too much damage and killing the prey.

=== Predators ===
==== Berserker ====
The Berserker Predator (Brian Steele) is a large, black Super Predator with an Alien's jawbone built onto its mask. Steele was nicknamed "Mr. Black" by the film crew. This Predator is the leader of the group and the main antagonist of the 2010 film. He likes to run and bash through forces, such as in the scene where he is being shot at, he runs straight through the shots. Also, unlike many Predators, he has no sense of honor and instead takes immense pleasure in killing unarmed or sick prey, something which normal Predators find dishonorable and unsportsmanlike. He likes to appear right in front of his prey. Upon finding out the captive Predator has been freed by Royce and is collaborating with him, he fights the freed Predator and decapitates him. After this, he immediately destroys the spaceship heading for Earth. Berserker is decapitated by Royce after having its mask smashed and being repeatedly slashed by an axe Royce acquires.

==== Tracker ====
The Tracker Predator (Carey Jones) has tusks attached to his helmet. This Predator controls the Predator Hounds. In a scene where he tries to kill Edwin, he quits and concentrates on killing Nikolai, stabbing him and lifting him off the ground with his wrist blade, but dies when Nikolai detonates an explosive.

==== Falconer ====
The Falconer Predator (Carey Jones) is the youngest of the three super-breed Predators. The Falconer has an angular mask, as opposed to other Predators' more organic, rounder looking masks. His skill is to learn and acquire tactics from his foes. The name comes from using a biomechanical bird creature to track the humans. He engages in a duel with Hanzo, which results with his and the human's death.

==== Classic Predator ====
The Classic Predator (Derek Mears) is a Predator from the Jungle Hunter Clan that is held prisoner by the three Super Predators. This Predator is named Classic because its design resembles the Predator from the 1987 film. He is later released by Royce with the agreement to send Royce back to Earth by hacking into the Super Predators' ship. The Berserker Predator sees the freed Classic Predator and becomes enraged. The two Predators then engage in a vicious duel; the Berserker eventually overpowers the weakened Classic Predator and cuts his head off, killing him.

== Introduced in The Predator (2018) ==
=== Quinn McKenna ===
Quinn McKenna (Boyd Holbrook) is a U.S. Army Ranger Captain and sniper. While he and his unit were on a mission to save hostages, he spotted an unidentified flying object land in the forest. He and one of his comrades discovered the Fugitive Predator's mask and gear, but are attacked by the Fugitive Predator itself. Quinn survives and takes some of the gear which he manages to ship back home for safety. He is interrogated by members of the "Stargazer Project" and deduces that they want to shut him up about seeing aliens. He is placed on a bus containing five other ex-servicemen (Nebraska, Coyle, Baxley, Lynch, Nettles) who have all suffered from one mental breakdown or another. He explains his situation and while they initially do not believe him, they are swiftly confronted by the Fugitive Predator and quickly jump into action and subsequently rescue Casey Brackett. Quinn is reunited with his son, Rory, and works to protect him from Traeger and the Apex Predator. He manages to kill the creature at the cost of his new allies and is reinstated as a Ranger. He learns what the Fugitive Predator's goal was: leave behind a set of "Predator Killer" armor that could be used to defend against future invasion, prompting Quinn to view it as his "new suit".

=== Will Traeger ===
Will Traeger (Sterling K. Brown) is a ruthless and corrupt government agent who tracks down Predators who come to Earth. He is the main antagonist of The Predator. He tried to fabricate false charges to have Quinn locked up in the asylum and was willing to order to have Quinn's son killed. He teams up with Quinn to stop the newly arrived Apex Predator, but accidentally kills himself with his reverse-engineered plasma-caster.

=== Rory McKenna ===
Rory McKenna (Jacob Tremblay) is Quinn's autistic son who can decipher and read other languages with remarkable ease. Early in the film he is bullied at school because of his autism and is later abducted by the Apex Predator, who wishes to utilize Rory's intelligence for Predator hybridization.

=== Nebraska ===
Gaylord “Nebraska” Williams (Trevante Rhodes) is a former U.S. Marine officer. He is on the bus with other military psych patients (Baxley, Coyle, Lynch and Nettles) when he meets Quinn McKenna, whom he immediately befriends. He claims that he was put on the bus because he shot a Commanding Officer. He later reveals that he was talking about himself as he shows a scar on the side of his head. He is the only one who stays by Quinn's side when he chooses to go after the Apex Predator; having to convince the others to come along as well. Later, he takes part in hunting the Apex Predator. When the Apex Predator tries to make off with Quinn's son, Rory, he, Quinn and Nettles hop onto the ship to stop him. Nettles is killed by the ship's shield while Quinn is trapped underneath. Hanging outside the shield, Nebraska coughs up blood, implying the reason for trying to kill himself was from having lung cancer (he is seen smoking throughout the film). He jumps into the intake of the ship's port engine, sacrificing himself, and successfully brings the ship down.

=== Casey Bracket ===
Casey Bracket (Olivia Munn) is a biologist who is recruited by Traeger to learn more about Predators, she was spared by the Fugitive Predator and teams up with Quinn's team to hunt and kill the newly arrived Apex Predator.

=== Baxley ===
Baxley (Thomas Jane) was an ex-Marine and the best friend of Coyle, who has Tourette's Syndrome. After being coaxed by Coyle, Baxley helps in the efforts to save Rory from the Apex Predator. Baxley is mortally wounded by the Apex Predator in combat, so he and Coyle, who was mortally wounded seconds after the latter, commit suicide by killing each other in a reciprocal mercy killing.

=== Coyle ===
Coyle (Keegan-Michael Key) was a former Marine and the best friend of Baxley, he is with him throughout the entire film and teams up with Baxley alone to take on the Apex Predator. Throughout the film he constantly makes jokes in an attempt to hide the past when he fired upon another vehicle of his own platoon (the only survivor being Baxley). He also receives fatal wounds from the Apex Predator, So he and Baxley commit suicide by killing each other out of brotherly love to end the pain.

=== Lynch ===
Lynch (Alfie Allen) is a former Marine and sniper who has PTSD. Lynch is mentioned to have once single-handedly wiped out an enemy platoon, something he views with pride. While preparing to snipe Traeger and his men, Lynch's arm is blown off by the Apex Predator. Lynch fires a flare gun to alert the others to the Apex Predator's presence before he is killed.

=== Sean Keyes ===
Sean Keyes (Jake Busey) is the son of Peter Keyes (Gary Busey) from Predator 2. Unlike his father, he's shown to be a nice and polite scientist. As he and Bracket were studying the Fugitive Predator, it woke and started killing most of the scientists and guards. Sean survived, but was injured, and was last seen telling Brackett not to let the Fugitive Predator escape. His fate is unknown.

=== Nettles ===
Nettles (Augusto Aguilera) is a former U.S. Army Blackhawk pilot who has an unspecified mental illness. Nettles has a crush on Brackett, but his attempts at flirting with her are ruined by his off-putting mannerisms and odd behavior. Nettles is one of the few to survive the Apex Predator's attack on both the Loonies and Traeger and his men, and boards the Apex Predator's ship alongside Quinn and Nebraska. Nettles is killed when the ship's force field activates, severing his legs and causing him to fall to his death.

=== Sapir ===
Sapir (Niall Matter) is the right-hand man Will Traeger. Sapir is killed by Quinn McKenna for assisting Traeger in kidnapping his son, Rory.

=== Emma McKenna ===
Emma McKenna (Yvonne Strahovski) is the ex-wife of Quinn, and is shown living with their son Rory. Her relationship with Quinn is shown to be strained.

=== Predators ===
==== ‘Fugitive’ Predator ====
The ‘Fugitive’ Predator (Brian A. Prince) is a smaller, lower-class Predator who travels to Earth to gift humanity with a weapon that will aide in the upcoming fight against the ‘Upgrade’ Predators’ design to colonise Earth.

==== ‘Ultimate’ Predator ====
The ‘Ultimate’ Predator is an upgraded Super Predator Hunter, who was sent to Earth to hunt down the ‘Fugitive’ Predator. Its body is upgraded with an exoskeleton that can withstand heavy fire and be used to heal itself. At 11 feet, he is almost 2x taller than the average Predator. The Predator anticipates that climate change will end their ability to retrieve human DNA for further hybridization, and as such is scrambling to retrieve samples before it is too late.

== Introduced in Prey (2022) ==
=== Naru ===
Naru (Amber Midthunder) is a young Comanche medicine woman who wishes to be a hunter. She and her dog, a Carolina Dog named Sarii, encounter a predator that came to Earth in 1719.

After facing the predator and declaring herself her tribe's boss, the tribe is supposedly attacked by the Yautjas. She's later seen in Predator: Killer of Killers captive on suspended animation alongside Ursa, Harrigan and Dutch.

=== Taabe ===
Taabe (Dakota Beavers) is the older brother of Naru who is looked up to by the Comanche tribe and supports his sister's endeavors.

In August 2022, Bennett Taylor confirmed that the script for Prey revealed Billy Sole, a Native American tracker and scout portrayed by Sonny Landham in the original Predator (1987), to be a reincarnation of Taabe, reframing his "last stand" with that film's Predator as being due to subconscious memories of a past life.

=== 'Feral' Predator / Mupitsl ===
The "Feral" Predator (Dane DiLiegro) is an aggressive and somewhat primitive Predator who travels to Earth looking for a worthy prey, who is dubbed a Mupitsl by Naru after the Comanche demon of legend. Unlike his future brethren, this one wears a skull helmet and hunts other carnivores as well as humans.

== Introduced in Predator: Badlands (2025) ==
=== Predators ===
==== Dek ====
Dek (Dimitrius Schuster-Koloamatangi) is a young Yautja cast out of his clan for being a runt.

==== Njohrr ====
Njohrr (Reuben de Jong) is Dek and Kwei's father and the leader of the Yautja clan.

==== Kwei ====
Kwei (Mike Homik) is Dek's protective older brother.

=== Thia ===
Thia (Elle Fanning) is a damaged Weyland-Yutani Corporation synthetic.

=== Tessa ===
Tessa (Fanning) is Thia's sister.

=== Bud ===
Bud (Rohinal Narayan) is a creature of the planet Genna.

== See also ==
- List of Alien characters
- List of Alien vs. Predator characters
