= Jerry Lambert =

Jerry Lambert may refer to:

- Jerry Lambert (actor) (born 1957), American actor
- Jerry Lambert (jockey) (1940–2015), American jockey
- List of characters in the Predator series#Jerry
