= Angela Catanzaro =

Angela M. Catanzaro is an Emmy and Eddie Award-nominated editor. She works in both television and feature films.

Catanzaro is a member of the Academy of Television Arts & Sciences, the Motion Picture Editors Guild, American Cinema Editors, and serves on the editing faculty at the American Film Institute.

Catanzaro is better known for her work on the 2025 feature film Thunderbolts*, as well as Prey (2022) and The Foreigner (2017).
