= Sarah Schachner =

American composer and musician (born 1985)

- Born: January 26, 1985 (age 41); Philadelphia, Pennsylvania, U.S.
- Education: Berklee College of Music
- Family: Emma R. Schachner (sister)
- Musical career
- Genres: Film score; classical; electronic
- Occupations: Musician; Composer
- Instruments: Cello; violin; synthesizer; piano
- Website: sarahschachner.com

Sarah Schachner is an American composer and musician who has worked on the scores of films, television series and video games.

She was nominated for the Grammy Award for Best Score Soundtrack for Video Games and Other Interactive Media for her work on Call of Duty: Modern Warfare II.

== Early life ==
Schachner grew up in the suburbs of Philadelphia. When she was five, she first started playing piano and then started playing the violin. She kept learning other instruments, such as viola and cello, and played with both family and in an orchestra, as well as a jazz band.

== Career ==
Schachner went to the Berklee College of Music and then moved to Los Angeles. She began to work with composer Brian Tyler, who worked in film and then started writing video game music. Tyler first brought Schachner in to work on Call of Duty: Modern Warfare 3. Schachner said, "I started doing music on the games for him and I realized how much I loved working on games." Since then Schachner has worked on more Call of Duty games such as Infinite Warfare and also worked with Ubisoft on the Far Cry and Assassin's Creed series. Schachner began to incorporate synthesizers with her work on string instruments.

In 2016, Ted Cruz's presidential campaign used one of Schachner's songs, "Lens", without permission. As the composer, she and the performer, along with a licensing firm, sued the Cruz campaign in May 2016 for copyright infringement.

Schachner also contributed to the Cassini Finale Music Project, a commemoration of the Cassini mission to Saturn.

== Discography ==
=== Film ===
Year	Title	Director	Studio(s)	Notes	Ref.
2010	Cool It	Ondi Timoner	Roadside Attractions	Co-composed with N’oa Winter Lazerus	
2010	She Believes in Fate	Douglas Lamore	Charlatan Studios	Short film	
2011	Remains	Colin Theys	Chiller Films	—N/a	
2012	Promesas	Aaron Celious	—N/a	Short film	
2013	UnHung Hero	Brian Spitz	Breaking Glass Pictures	—N/a	
2015	The Lazarus Effect	David Gelb	Relativity Media	—N/a	
2022	Prey	Dan Trachtenberg	20th Century Studios	First collaboration with Dan Trachtenberg.	
2025	Predator: Badlands	Dan Trachtenberg	20th Century Studios	Second collaboration with Dan Trachtenberg. Co-composed with Benjamin Wallfisch.	

==== Other music credits ====
Year	Title	Director	Studio(s)	Notes	Ref.
2012	John Dies at the End	Don Coscarelli	Magnet Releasing	Additional music	
2012	The Expendables 2	Simon West	Lionsgate	Musical score arrangements	
2013	Iron Man 3	Shane Black	Marvel Studios	Arranger and programmer	
2013	Now You See Me	Louis Leterrier	Summit Entertainment	Arranger and programmer	
2016	Now You See Me 2	Jon M. Chu	Summit Entertainment	Arranger and programmer	

=== Television ===
Year	Title	Original Channel	Notes	Ref.
2010	Brew Masters	Discovery Channel	—N/a	
2011	The Troop	Nickelodeon	—N/a	
2015	Chef's Table	Netflix	Episode: "Massimo Bottura" & "Jordi Roca"	

=== Video games ===
Year	Title	Studio	Notes	Ref.
2014	Assassin's Creed: Unity	Ubisoft	Co-composed with Chris Tilton and Ryan Amon	
2016	Call of Duty: Infinite Warfare	Activision	—N/a	
2017	Assassin's Creed Origins	Ubisoft	—N/a	
2019	Anthem	Electronic Arts	—N/a	
2019	Call of Duty: Modern Warfare	Activision	—N/a	
2020	Assassin's Creed Valhalla	Ubisoft	Co-composed with Jesper Kyd and Einar Selvik	
2022	Call of Duty: Modern Warfare II	Activision	—N/a	

==== Other music credits ====
Year	Title	Studio	Notes	Ref.
2011	Call of Duty: Modern Warfare 3	Activision	Additional guitars & violin Musical score arrangements	
2011	Need for Speed: The Run	Electronic Arts	Additional guitars Musical score arrangements	
2012	Far Cry 3	Ubisoft	Additional music, cellos, violin, and vocals	
2013	Army of Two: The Devil's Cartel	Electronic Arts	Additional music, cello and violin	
2013	Assassin's Creed IV: Black Flag	Ubisoft	Additional music	
