= Prey (2022 film) =

2022 film by Dan Trachtenberg

- Promotional release poster
- Directed by: Dan Trachtenberg
- Screenplay by: Patrick Aison
- Story by: Patrick Aison; Dan Trachtenberg
- Based on: Characters by: Jim Thomas; John Thomas
- Produced by: John Davis; Jhane Myers; Marty Ewing
- Starring: Amber Midthunder; Dakota Beavers; Dane DiLiegro; Michelle Thrush; Stormee Kipp; Julian Black Antelope; Bennett Taylor
- Cinematography: Jeff Cutter
- Edited by: Angela M. Catanzaro; Claudia Castello
- Music by: Sarah Schachner
- Production companies: 20th Century Studios; Lawrence Gordon Productions; Davis Entertainment
- Distributed by: Hulu
- Release dates: July 21, 2022 (San Diego Comic-Con); August 5, 2022 (United States)
- Running time: 99 minutes
- Country: United States
- Language: English
- Budget: $65 million

Prey is a 2022 American science fiction horror film directed by Dan Trachtenberg from a screenplay by Patrick Aison, based on a story by Aison and Trachtenberg. It is the fifth installment in the Predator franchise and a prequel to Predator (1987), set in the Northern Great Plains in 1719. It stars Amber Midthunder, Dakota Beavers, Dane DiLiegro, Michelle Thrush, Stormee Kipp, Julian Black Antelope, and Bennett Taylor. The story revolves around Naru, a young Comanche woman, who is striving to prove herself as a hunter. She finds herself having to protect her people from a vicious, humanoid alien that hunts humans for sport.

Development of the film began during the production of The Predator (2018), when producer John Davis was approached by Trachtenberg and Aison, with a concept that they had been developing since 2016. In late 2020, the film's title was revealed. Principal photography took place around Calgary during the summer of 2021, with most of the film being filmed in English, with some sequences being shot in Comanche and French as well. A full Comanche language dub was provided for the film, with the cast reprising their roles, thus making it the first feature film to do so.

Prey premiered at San Diego Comic-Con on July 21, 2022, and was released by 20th Century Studios as a Hulu original film in the United States on August 5. The film received positive reviews from critics and high viewership, leading Trachtenberg to direct two additional Predator films, Predator: Killer of Killers and Predator: Badlands, both released in 2025.

== Plot ==
In 1719 in the Great Plains, Naru, a young Comanche woman trained as a healer dreams of becoming a great hunter like her brother, Taabe. While tracking deer, she witnesses strange lights in the sky, which she believes to be a Thunderbird and a sign that she is ready to become a hunter. However, they are actually from a Predator dropship.

A member of the tribe named Puhi is taken by a mountain lion, so Naru uses her tracking skills to assist a search party led by Taabe. The search party finds Puhi alive, but wounded. All members of the party except for Taabe, Naru, and Paake leave to take him back to the tribe. The three set a trap for the mountain lion, but it kills Paake. Naru faces off with the beast, but is knocked unconscious after being distracted by strange sounds and lights in the distance.

Naru awakens at home, having been carried back by Taabe. After Taabe goes back to the forest, he kills the mountain lion and carries its body back to the village, earning him the title of War Chief. Convinced that there is a greater threat in the woods, Naru departs with her dog, Sarii. She stumbles into a bog pit and narrowly escapes before being attacked by a grizzly bear; she is able to escape after it is attacked and killed by the Predator. Shortly after, she runs into a group of Comanche sent to find her. The Predator, which Naru calls a "Mupitsi", (Note: Named after Pia Mupitsi ('Mother owl'), a monster in Comanche folklore.) ambushes and kills the men. While running away, she is caught in a foothold trap.

French voyageurs, who had set the trap, find Naru, and cage her and Sarii. Their interpreter, Raphael Adolini, questions Naru about the Predator, whom the Frenchmen have encountered before. When she refuses to talk, the lead voyageur reveals that Taabe is also their captive. The next morning, the Frenchmen use both siblings as bait for the Predator, which they intend to capture. The Predator ignores Taabe and Naru and kills most of the Frenchmen. During the battle, Raphael's leg is cut off. Freeing themselves by using a foothold trap to cut the ropes, Taabe and Naru split up to get horses, and find Sarii, respectively. Naru rescues Sarii from the French camp and sends him to find Taabe.

A maimed Raphael, having dragged himself back to the camp, teaches Naru how to use his flintlock pistol (Note: The engraving on the gun reveals it is the same weapon that a Predator gives to Mike Harrigan in 1997 at the end of Predator 2 (1990).) in exchange for medical treatment of his severed leg. As part of the treatment, Naru gives him herbs that have the side effect of reducing his body heat. The Predator arrives and tracks the blood from Raphael's leg, but does not see Raphael, leading Naru to realize that his reduced heat must have made him invisible to the Predator. The Predator then kills Raphael after accidentally stepping on him. Sarii returns with Taabe, who fights the Predator on horseback. During the fight, Naru notices that the Predator's spears are aimed using its mask. Although able to wound it several times, Taabe is killed by the Predator, but not before giving Naru time to escape.

Naru finds the surviving lead voyageur and uses him as bait for the Predator. After consuming the herbs to hide her body heat, she ambushes it, using Raphael's pistol, and removes its mask. Stealing the device, she positions it to face the bog in which she had previously been caught. Naru battles the Predator and lures it into the bog, where it becomes mired. It fires the spear gun at Naru and the mask guides the projectile back into its head, killing it. Naru severs its head and paints her face with its glowing green blood. She returns with its head to her village, where she is declared the new War Chief. Naru informs her tribe that it is time for them to move.

During the credits, the narrative is summarized in a series of ledger art paintings that ends with a depiction of three Predator vessels descending towards the tribe. (Note: Identified as the Predator ships from Predator: Killer of Killers (2025))

== Cast ==
- Amber Midthunder as Naru, a young Comanche warrior who protects her tribe against a Predator.
- Dakota Beavers as Taabe, Naru's brother and a skilled hunter who becomes a war leader. In August 2022, Bennett Taylor confirmed that the script for Prey revealed Billy Sole, a Native American tracker and scout played by Sonny Landham in the original Predator (1987), to be a reincarnation of Taabe, reframing his "last stand" with that film's Predator as being due to subconscious memories of a past life.
- Dane DiLiegro as the Feral Predator, shown to wield primitive versions of the advanced weaponry used by Predators in previous future-set films, which Naru calls a Mupitsi after a monster in Comanche folklore.
- Michelle Thrush as Aruka, Naru and Taabe's mother
- Julian Black Antelope as Chief Kehetu
- Corvin Mack as Paaka
- Coco as Sarii, Naru's dog companion
- Stormee Kipp as Wasape, a Comanche hunter who looks down on Naru
- Mike Paterson as Big Beard
- Bennett Taylor as Captain Raphael Adolini, an Italian translator hired by the French. This character was first alluded to in Predator 2 (1990) and later depicted in the comic book Predator 1718 (1996), which Taylor read as the basis for his performance, Trachtenberg permitting him to rewrite his lines based on the storyline.
- Nelson Leis as Waxed Mustache
- Troy Mundle as Spyglass
- Harlan Blayne Kytwayhat as Itsee

== Production ==
=== Development and casting ===
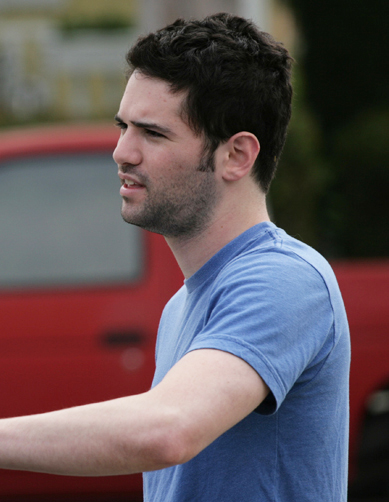
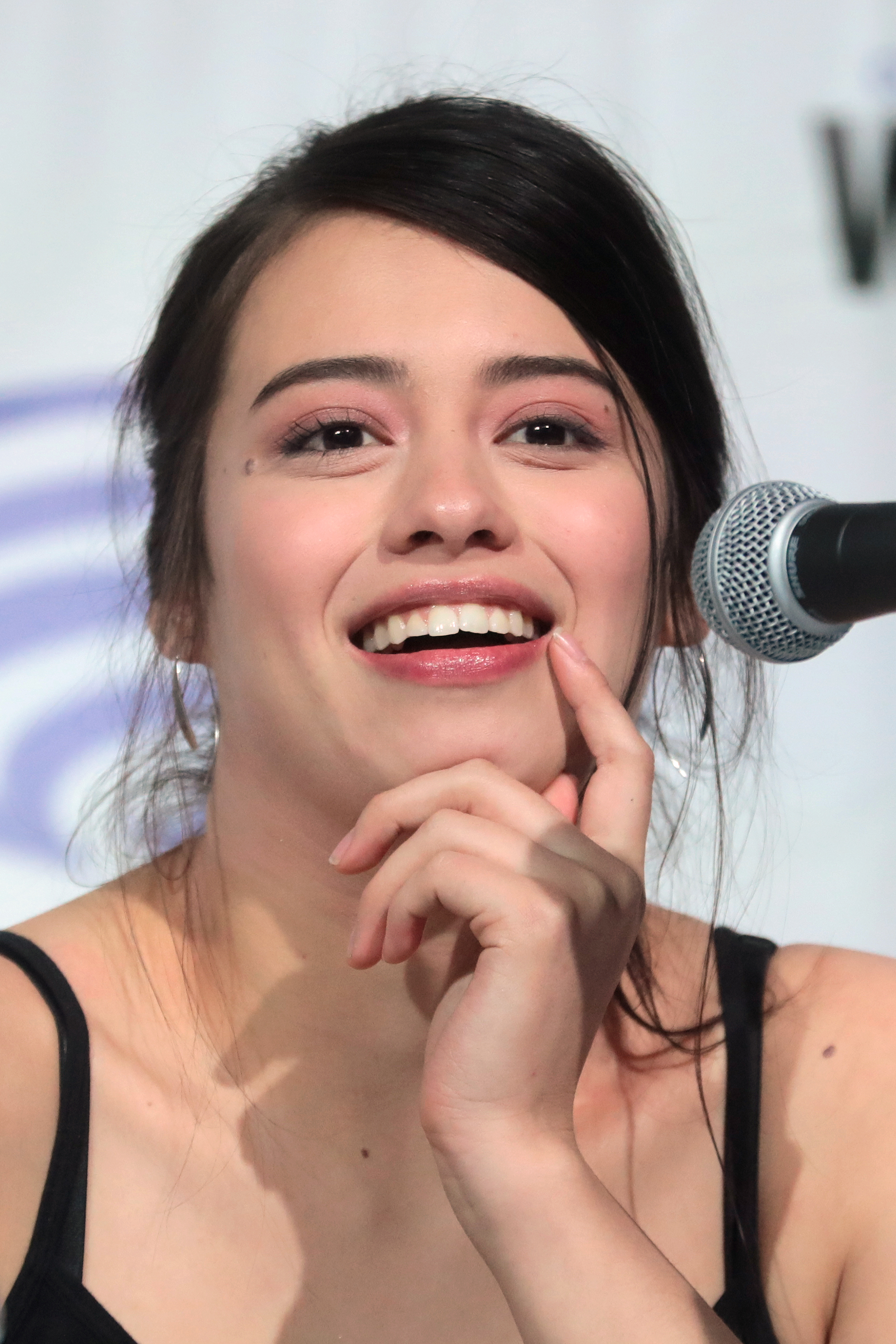
Prey is the second feature film from director Dan Trachtenberg (left) after 10 Cloverfield Lane. It stars Amber Midthunder (right) in the lead role as Naru.

The film began development during the production of the prior Predator film, titled The Predator (2018), when producer John Davis was approached by Dan Trachtenberg and screenwriter Patrick Aison, with a concept they had been working on since 2016. Trachtenberg said that he only had an idea about "someone trying to prove themselves and what they could be up against," that turned out to fit well into the Predator franchise, as showing a Native American "using your smarts and ingenuity" against more technologically advanced adversaries showed that "there's no set of brawn other than fortitude that can allow you to succeed against the impossible". He also said that it was an attempt at giving a full movie to a character similar to Billy from the original Predator, a Native American who decides to stand up against the alien. 20th Century Studios production president Emma Watts fast-tracked the development of the film, which was expected to be R-rated.

In December 2019, the film was initially under wraps, going by the name of Skulls. The film reportedly was to "follow a Comanche woman who goes against gender norms and traditions to become a warrior". It was to be directed by Trachtenberg and written by Aison. Cast auditions were held in February 2020, before pre-production was shut down by the COVID-19 pandemic. In November 2020, Skulls was revealed to be a codename for a fifth installment in the Predator franchise, with the same creative team working on the film. Upon the announcement, Trachtenberg indicated that the original intention was to market the film with no reference to the Predators, something no longer possible with the confirmation of the film's place in the franchise. Prey had been the first title for the film that Trachtenberg proposed, serving as "a mirror to the main franchise" and intending for it to serve as a standalone installment due to production of Shane Black's The Predator (2018). He also chose the title as he wanted to avoid traditional naming conventions for franchise films and considered there was sufficient precedent to do so. The Comanche were chosen as the central tribe because Trachtenberg considered them "the most fierce warriors to walk this continent, arguably, and they were incredibly innovative." He also wished to portray them as the heroes instead of their usual portrayal as sidekicks or villains.

In May 2021, Amber Midthunder was announced to star. On November 12, 2021, Disney+ Day, the film was given the title Prey, and announced for a mid-2022 release on Hulu and Disney+ internationally. Trachtenberg explained his goal for the film was to get back to the roots of the franchise: "the ingenuity of a human being who won't give up, who's able to observe and interpret, basically being able to beat a stronger, more powerful, well-armed force". Dane DiLiegro ended up becoming the Predator because Dan Trachtenberg sought a different type compared to the original portrayer Kevin Peter Hall's "WWF 1987 wrestler standoff type thing", leading to someone with a more 'feline' athletic body, that would also allow what effects artist Alec Gillis described as "some elegance and fluidity of movement as opposed to the Hulking Stuntman School of Suit Performance."

=== Filming ===
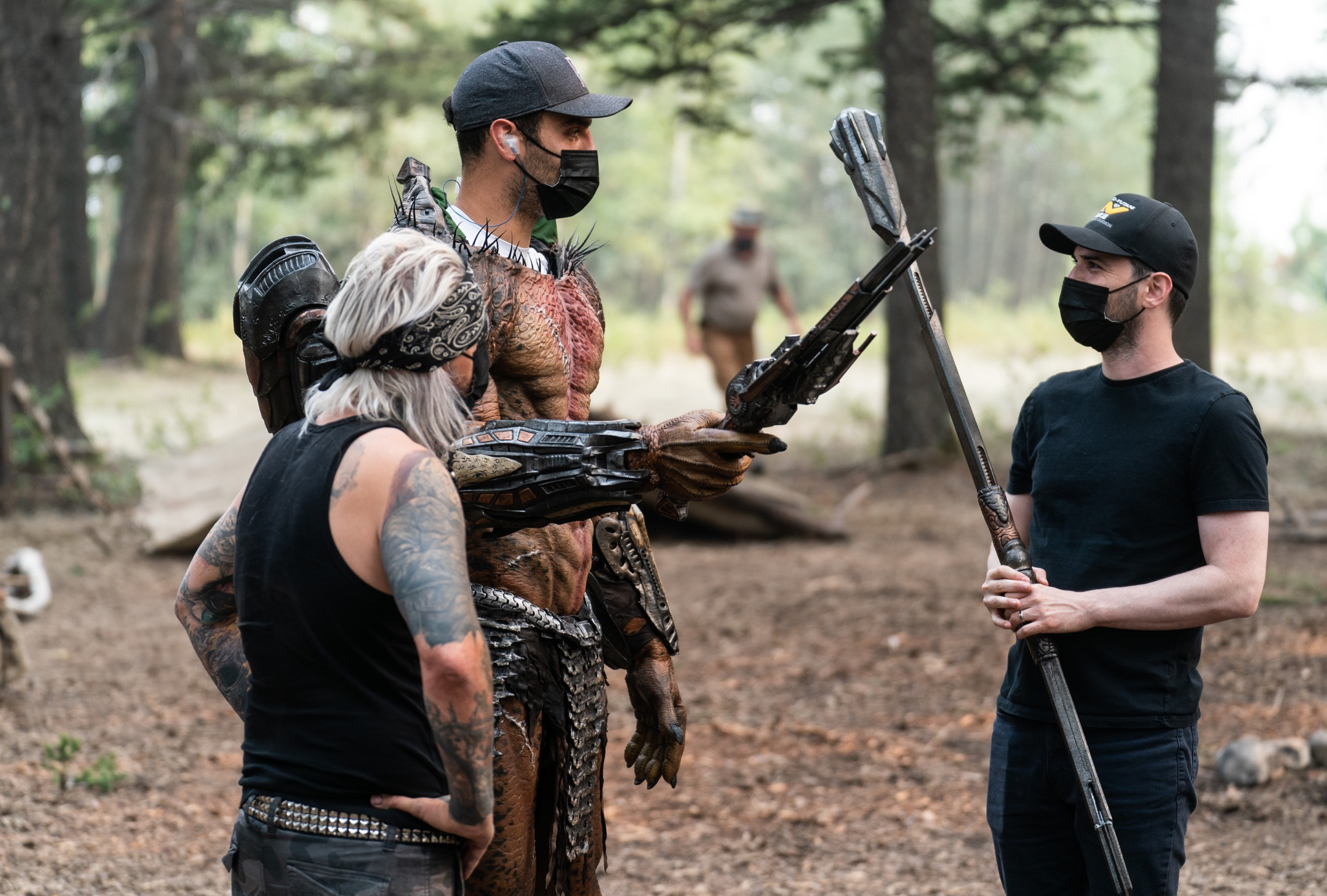
Dane DiLiegro (center), in Predator costume, and Dan Trachtenberg (right) discuss a scene while shooting.

Filming began in June 2021 in Calgary, Alberta primarily in Stoney Nakoda First Nation land 45 minutes outside the city, with studio set pieces including the beaver dam where the protagonist Naru hides from a bear and the fur trapper camp where she baits the Predator. Additional locations include Moose Mountain and Elbow River. The cast preceded filming with four weeks of training camp, working with weapons and personal trainers, and while team-building they conceived a sign language for the characters to communicate non-verbally. Midthunder had a particular focus on axe throwing, with a rope being attached to the axe's end in order for it to be quickly obtained. Jhane Myers, a member of both the Comanche Nation and the Blackfeet Nation, served as a producer on the film. Describing filming near Calgary, Myers stated, "We were shooting on Stoney Nakoda land. [Midthunder] is part Nakoda, even I am on my grandmother's side. Usually, when we start a production, someone [from the Native community] comes in and does a cedar ceremony and blesses everything. But because we had so many Indigenous people on the cast, First Nation people too, and since we were on true plains land, they sent out two pipe carriers and two smudge people to have a pipe ceremony." The pipe ceremony was conducted outside Calgary by local Indigenous leaders and attended by Midthunder and her co-stars Beavers and Kipp, as well as Myers and Trachtenberg, among others. The first scenes filmed involved the Comanche camp, including the ending right in the second week, before moving onto parts focusing on Naru solo and the French trappers prior to actually featuring the Predator on the set.

Cinematographer Jeff Cutter filmed in the anamorphic format to better depict the vast locations, using a relatively naturalistic approach without much artificial lighting, "to respect nature and to respect the landscapes", which in the night sequences relied mostly on torches along with "soft, low underexposed amounts of blue" to replicate moonlight. For added illumination in the actors' faces, the torches would also have LED strips on the end that faced away from the camera. The day scenes took advantage from how daylight lasts "close to 14 or 15 hours a day" in Calgary during the summer, along with how the magic hour lasted twice as long as in Los Angeles. Cutter found the scene where the Predator engages in a fight with the French trappers to be the most difficult to film, being shot across eight days in a 250 square feet (23 m^{2}) area with a hundred scenographic trees and three smoke machines. The scenes depicting the Predator vision were filmed with a thermographic camera lying on top of the regular one. The scene with the skinned bison was added as a red herring to evoke how the Predators skinned the dead humans in the previous movies, only for it to turn out to be the French expeditionaries culling the buffalo to harm the Comanche.

In July 2021, Davis revealed that the film was officially three-quarters of the way finished. In September, filming wrapped and the castings of Dakota Beavers and Dane DiLiegro were confirmed. Sarii, Naru's dog companion, was played by a Carolina dog named Coco who was adopted and trained specifically for the film. The idea of giving Naru a dog companion was inspired by Mad Max 2. Initially, Coco was to be in fewer scenes, but they found with her training and energy they were able to include the dog in several more scenes, including some of the action sequences.

=== Language ===
Trachtenberg said they discussed whether they should start the film with characters speaking the Comanche language before switching to English for the benefit of the audience, similar to the Russian language in The Hunt for Red October (1990). They considered a similar approach at first but ultimately felt it did not work. The film was shot in English and later dubbed in Comanche, with the entire cast performing an alternate all-Comanche dub of the film. The film is the first feature film to have a full Comanche language dub. Both language versions, Comanche and English, are available on Hulu and Disney+.

=== Visual effects ===
Amalgamated Dynamics Inc. (ADI) was hired to work on the visual and creature effects on the film, having previously worked on The Predator and the crossover films Alien vs. Predator (2004) and Aliens vs. Predator: Requiem (2007). The Predator's new design aimed to make him scarier and also take advantage of the leaner physique of portrayer Dane DiLiegro. To make him less humanoid, there were changes to the face like more spaced eyes that led to a head fully made of animatronics standing atop DiLiegro's own, reducing his sight to two small holes in the neck piece. The costume, which had the challenge of being flexible for the fight choreography while resistant enough to withstand the location's weather, weighed 80 pounds (36 kg) and was primarily made out of foam latex, which DiLiegro noted as being "essentially a sponge" getting heavier and wetter as he sweated under the summer sun. The helmet was especially difficult, with DiLiegro's vision almost completely obscured save for two small slits. This required him to rehearse his movements beforehand and rely on directions via radio. At one point the wiring caused the helmet to catch fire.

During post-production, Moving Picture Company (MPC) was the main company for the visual effects; these included a full digital recreation of the Predator, mostly for scenes where he is invisible or to augment or replace parts of the animatronic suit, along with computer-generated animals, blood, arrows and environmental enhancements. DiLiegro himself provided the digital Predator's motion capture. Additional visual effects were provided by Industrial Light & Magic (ILM), Track VFX, and Pixel Light Effects. The Third Floor, Inc. provided previsualization reels. The film's main and end titles were done by Filmograph in collaboration with Native American illustrators, who provided an animated version of a Plains-style hide painting, which depicts the film's entire narrative. At the very end, the painting includes action not shown in the film: Naru, Sarii and three other Comanche are gathered around the severed head of the Predator. They look up and, amid lightning, see three Predator spaceships headed down from the sky towards them.

== Music ==
Sarah Schachner composed the musical score. Trachtenberg hired her after playing Assassin's Creed: Valhalla during pre-production and being impressed with her score for the game. Schachner said the music had to play a big role given the film's sparse dialogue, with the challenge of "feeling equally large and expansive as well as intimate and raw", as it featured both "fun gory action and suspense" and Naru's emotional character arc. Trachtenberg worked closely with Schachner to develop Naru's theme, as the director "was adamant that it should feel like a journey; that it starts small and really take you somewhere." Schachner recorded most of the strings herself, and Native American musician Robert Mirabal provided flute and vocals. The soundtrack album was released by Hollywood Records on August 5, 2022.

== Historical and scientific accuracy ==
During the film's production, Myers provided binders of reference materials to the production team. She also advised the production on creating a period-accurate toothbrush, which Midthunder can be seen using in the film. An early draft of the script did not include mention of horses; Myers insisted that horses be added, later stating, "We're a horse culture, so you can see that in [the character of] Taabe and his horse riding. And then you can see that in the camps where we have horses. When I originally saw the first script, there were no horses in it. And I said, 'You can't have Comanches without horses!' So that's where that came in, and when we wrote the Taabe scene."

As for the plant called orange totsiyaa (the latter purportedly meaning simply "flower"), it has been compared to calendula and was possibly inspired by it, both in floral appearance and similar medicinal effects.

== Release ==
=== Streaming ===
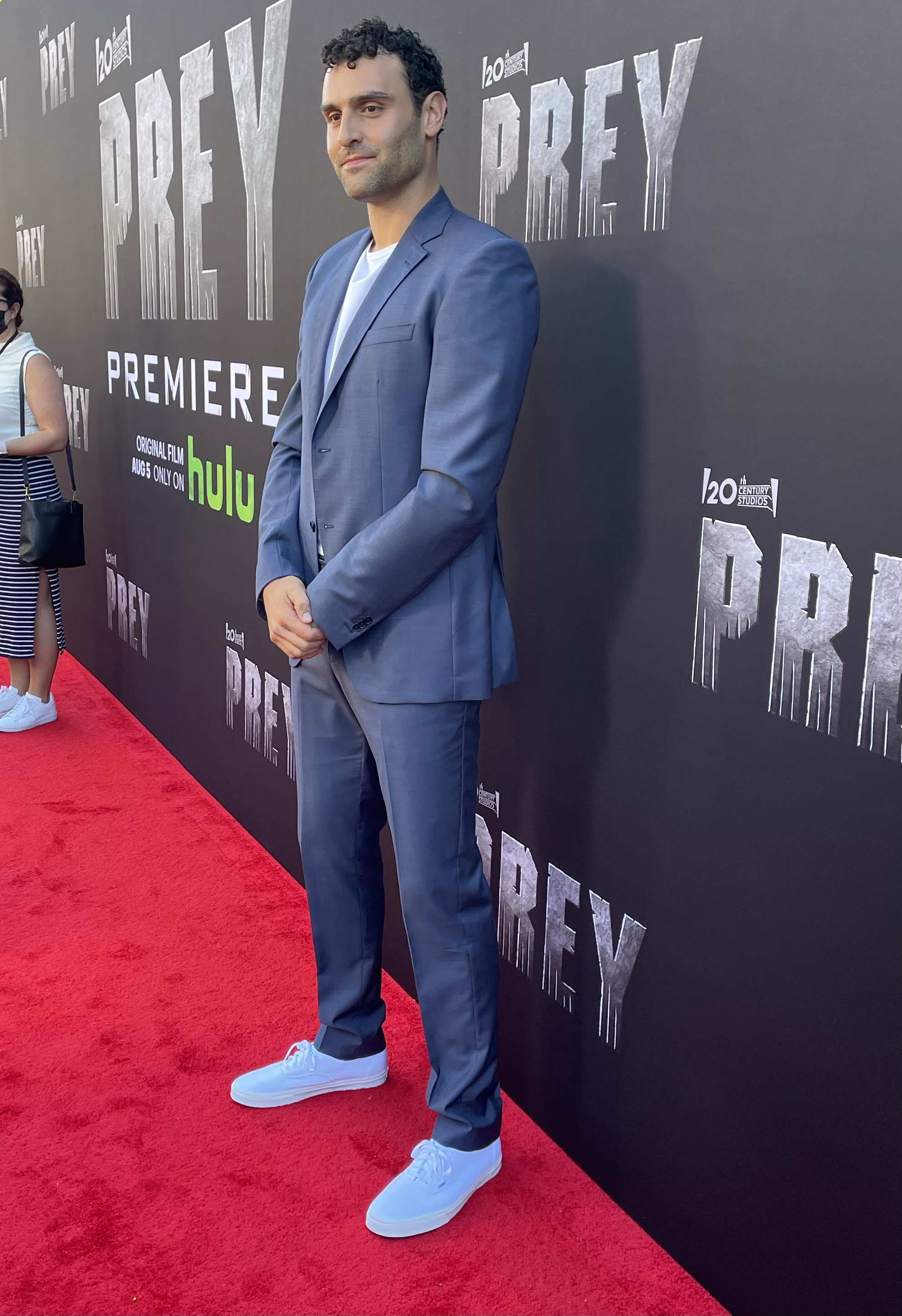
Dane DiLiegro at the premiere of Prey

Prey premiered at San Diego Comic-Con on July 21, 2022, during an exclusive screening hosted by Collider, and was released by 20th Century Studios as a Hulu original film on August 5. It was also released on Disney+ Hotstar in Southeast Asian territories, on Star+ in Latin America and on Disney+ as part of the Star content hub in other international territories.

=== Home media ===
The film was released on DVD, Blu-ray, and Ultra HD Blu-ray on October 3, 2023.

== Reception ==
=== Audience viewership ===
According to 20th Century Studios, Prey was the most-watched premiere across all films and television series on Hulu in the United States, as well as the most-watched film premiere on Star in international markets, and on Star+ in Latin America. According to streaming aggregator Reelgood, Prey was the most watched program across all platforms during the week of August 12, 2022. According to Whip Media, Prey was the most watched movie in the United States from August 5 to August 7, 2022.

=== Critical response ===
On the review aggregator website Rotten Tomatoes, 94% of 291 critics' reviews are positive, with an average rating of 7.7/10. The website's consensus reads: "The rare action thriller that spikes adrenaline without skimping on character development, Prey is a Predator sequel done right." Metacritic gave the film a weighted average score of 71 out of 100, based on 43 critics, indicating "generally favorable reviews". It became the highest-rated Predator film on both websites with many critics calling it the best Predator installment since the first film. Two stars from the original Predator film commented positively. Jesse Ventura praised Amber Midthunder and the director: "Thank you for making such a thoughtful, creative, and wonderful film." Bill Duke was also enthusiastic about the film: "It's an amazing film and @AmberMidthunder is phenomenal."

David Fear of Rolling Stone referred to the film as a "long-awaited masterpiece" and "series highlight" and compared Midthunder's character favorably to Ellen Ripley of the Alien films. Andrew Webster of The Verge admired "how patient it is", adding, "What makes Prey work is its simplicity. It never strays from its concept, instead slowly building up the tension before reaching a very exciting battle." Belen Edwards of Mashable called it "intimate and character-driven, with more than enough action to satisfy the most die-hard Predator fans ... even if you've never watched a Predator movie, chances are you'll love Prey. It's just that good."

In a 3.5-out-of-4-star review, Odie Henderson of RogerEbert.com praised Naru's character and the representation of the Comanche Nation and called the film a "scary and fun amusement park ride that also elicits a surprisingly tender emotional response". Tom Jorgensen of IGN rated it 8 out of 10, commended the level of violence and tension depicted across the action sequences, and felt the story was simple without being simplistic. James Dyer of Empire rated the movie 4 out of 5 stars and found it to be the best Predator since the original, with a "ferocious heroine, authentic period setting, and a bloody string of inventive action beats".

Wendy Ide, in a 4-out-of-5-star review in the Observer, said that Prey "stays true to the essence of the original – stylishly violent, stickily graphic, impossibly tense" but that it was also successful "as a self-contained entity". Clarisse Loughrey gave the film 4 stars out of 5 in a review in the Independent praising the lighting and sound design while also hailing the film's message of empowerment. Kevin Maher in the Times enjoyed the jeopardy of the film with characters being "in actual danger of harm, injury or even death".

Benjamin Lee for the Guardian gave the film 3 stars out of 5 but said, "It feels genuinely new to see a genre film of this scale centred on an almost entirely Native cast." The New York Times's Jeannette Catsoulis disliked the film's editing, plot, and antagonists but commended Midthunder's performance, Cutter's cinematography, and the authentic depiction of Native American culture. Writing for Slant Magazine, Chuck Bowen was critical of Trachtenberg's direction as he did not like the costumes or the depiction of the Predator, feeling it to be a "dull matter-of-factness". Going on to rate the film 1 star out of 5, he negatively compared the film to Predator and opined the predator motif was treated in a literal manner, resulting in "a mess of anonymous action sequences and half-baked symbolism".

=== Accolades ===
Prey was nominated for six Primetime Emmy Awards, winning one for Outstanding Sound Editing for a Limited or Anthology Series, Movie or Special marking the first Emmy win for the Predator franchise.

Award	Date of ceremony	Category	Recipient(s)	Result	Ref.
Alliance of Women Film Journalists Awards	January 5, 2023	Best Woman Breakthrough Performance	Amber Midthunder	Nominated	
Austin Film Critics Association Awards	January 10, 2023	The Robert R. "Bobby" McCurdy Memorial Breakthrough Artist Award	Amber Midthunder	Nominated	
Cinema Audio Society Awards	March 4, 2023	Outstanding Achievement in Sound Mixing for a Non-Theatrical Motion Pictures or Limited Series	Ron Osiowy, Craig Henighan, Chris Terhune, Joel Dougherty, Frank Wolf, Jamison Rabbe, Connor Nagy	Nominated	
Critics' Choice Awards	January 15, 2023	Best Movie Made for Television	Prey	Nominated	
Critics' Choice Awards	January 15, 2023	Best Actress in a Limited Series or Movie Made for Television	Amber Midthunder	Nominated	
Critics' Choice Super Awards	March 16, 2023	Best Science Fiction/Fantasy Movie	Prey	Nominated	
Critics' Choice Super Awards	March 16, 2023	Best Actress in a Science Fiction/Fantasy Movie	Amber Midthunder	Nominated	
Hollywood Critics Association TV Awards	January 8, 2024	Best Streaming Movie	Prey	Nominated	
Hollywood Critics Association TV Awards	January 8, 2024	Best Actress in a Streaming Limited or Anthology Series or Movie	Amber Midthunder	Nominated	
Hollywood Critics Association TV Awards	January 8, 2024	Best Directing in a Streaming Limited or Anthology Series or Movie	Dan Trachtenberg	Nominated	
Primetime Emmy Awards	January 15, 2024	Outstanding Directing for a Limited or Anthology Series or Movie	Dan Trachtenberg	Nominated	
Primetime Emmy Awards	January 15, 2024	Outstanding Writing for a Limited or Anthology Series or Movie	Patrick Aison, Dan Trachtenberg	Nominated	
Primetime Creative Arts Emmy Awards	January 6–7, 2024	Outstanding Television Movie	Prey	Nominated	
Primetime Creative Arts Emmy Awards	January 6–7, 2024	Outstanding Music Composition for a Limited or Anthology Series, Movie or Special	Sarah Schachner	Nominated	
Primetime Creative Arts Emmy Awards	January 6–7, 2024	Outstanding Picture Editing for a Limited or Anthology Series or Movie	Angela M. Catanzaro, Claudia Castello	Nominated	
Primetime Creative Arts Emmy Awards	January 6–7, 2024	Outstanding Sound Editing for a Limited or Anthology Series, Movie or Special	Chris Terhune, William Files, Jessie Anne Spence, James Miller, Diego Perez, Lee Gilmore, Christopher Bonis, Daniel DiPrima, Stephen Perone, Leslie Bloome, Shaun Brennan	Won	
Fangoria Chainsaw Awards	May 22, 2023	Best Streaming Premiere Film	Prey	Won	
Fangoria Chainsaw Awards	May 22, 2023	Best Lead Performance	Amber Midthunder	Nominated	
Fangoria Chainsaw Awards	May 22, 2023	Best Costume Design	Stephanie Portnoy Porter	Won	
Fangoria Chainsaw Awards	May 22, 2023	Best Creature FX	Alec Gillis, Tom Woodruff	Won	
Golden Reel Awards	February 26, 2023	Outstanding Achievement in Sound Editing – Non-Theatrical Feature	Chris Terhune, Will Files, James Miller, Christopher Bonis, Diego Perez, Lee Gilmore, Jessie Anne Spence, David Bach, Korey Pereira, Nick Seaman, Roni Pillischer, Annie Taylor, Leslie Bloome, Shaun Brennan	Won	
Hollywood Music in Media Awards	November 16, 2022	Best Original Score – Streamed Live Action Film (No Theatrical Release)	Sarah Schachner	Won	
Hugo Awards	October 21, 2023	Best Dramatic Presentation (Long Form)	Prey	Declined nomination	
Producers Guild of America Awards	February 25, 2023	Best Streamed or Televised Movie	Prey	Nominated	
Saturn Awards	February 4, 2024	Best Science Fiction Film	Prey	Nominated	
Saturn Awards	February 4, 2024	Best Actress in a Film	Amber Midthunder	Nominated	
Saturn Awards	February 4, 2024	Best Film Make-Up	Alec Gillis & Tom Woodruff	Nominated	

== Animated film and sequel ==
In June 2022, Trachtenberg stated that there are discussions for additional installments to be developed after the release of Prey, saying their intent was to "do things that have not been done before" in the franchise. In August, Taylor expressed interest in reprising his role as Raphael Adolini in a potential Prey prequel, intending for the project to serve as a loose adaptation of the comic book storyline Predator 1718 (1996), where Adolini is initially introduced. In October 2023, Trachtenberg confirmed the studio's interest in continuing the franchise with ongoing discussions as to how it can be done properly. The filmmaker stated that discussions of where to take Predator next have occurred since production on Prey ended, looking for ways to live up to the quality of Prey while also adapting something new for the franchise. Production Weekly listed a follow-up project as being in development by September 2023, revealed to be two stand-alone films titled Predator: Killer of Killers and Predator: Badlands, again directed by Dan Trachtenberg, with Elle Fanning cast as two Weyland-Yutani androids in the latter. Predator: Killer of Killers was released on June 6, 2025, on Hulu and Disney+ and outside of the United States via the Star hub, while Predator: Badlands was theatrically released in the United States on November 7, 2025.
