= Predator: Badlands =

2025 film by Dan Trachtenberg

- Theatrical release poster
- Directed by: Dan Trachtenberg
- Screenplay by: Patrick Aison
- Story by: Patrick Aison; Dan Trachtenberg
- Based on: Characters by: Jim Thomas; John Thomas
- Produced by: John Davis; Brent O'Connor; Marc Toberoff; Dan Trachtenberg; Ben Rosenblatt
- Starring: Elle Fanning; Dimitrius Schuster-Koloamatangi
- Cinematography: Jeff Cutter
- Edited by: Stefan Grube; David Trachtenberg
- Music by: Sarah Schachner; Benjamin Wallfisch
- Production companies: 20th Century Studios; Davis Entertainment; Lawrence Gordon Productions; Toberoff Entertainment
- Distributed by: 20th Century Studios
- Release dates: November 3, 2025 (TCL Chinese Theatre); November 7, 2025 (United States)
- Running time: 107 minutes
- Country: United States
- Languages: English; Fictional language
- Budget: $105 million
- Box office: $184.6 million

Predator: Badlands is a 2025 American science fiction action film directed by Dan Trachtenberg and written by Patrick Aison from a story by Trachtenberg and Aison. It is the seventh installment in the Predator franchise. The film stars Elle Fanning and Dimitrius Schuster-Koloamatangi in leading roles. The story follows Dek, a young exiled Yautja, who crash-lands on a hostile planet and must prove himself worthy of the hunt by killing an apex predator, leading him to form an alliance with Thia, a Weyland-Yutani Corporation android.

Following the success of Prey (2022), Trachtenberg returned to direct two additional films in the franchise. Badlands was announced to be releasing in 2025 after another Predator film, which would later turn out to be adult animated film Predator: Killer of Killers (2025).

Predator: Badlands premiered at the TCL Chinese Theatre on November 3, 2025, and was released in the United States on November 7, by 20th Century Studios. The film received generally positive reviews from critics and grossed over $184 million worldwide.

== Plot ==
Yautja are prey to none. Friend to none. Predator to all.

— "Yautja Codex 0422/25", Opening epigraph

Dek, a Yautja runt, seeks approval from his father and clan leader, Njohrr. Dek plans to hunt the Kalisk, an apex predator on the "death planet" Genna. However, Njohrr orders Dek's brother Kwei to kill him, deeming him too weak for the clan. Defying the order, Kwei activates his ship to transport Dek to Genna, fighting Njohrr only to be defeated; Dek watches helplessly as Njohrr executes Kwei.

Upon crash-landing, Dek faces numerous dangers from Genna's flora and fauna, losing almost all of his gear. He reluctantly allies with Thia, a damaged Weyland-Yutani Corporation android, whose team was destroyed by the Kalisk. Thia offers to help Dek track the Kalisk. Later, they are joined by a friendly creature that Thia names Bud, who marks Dek with her saliva out of gratitude for Dek having saved and fed her. Meanwhile, Thia's "sister", Tessa, is retrieved by Weyland-Yutani and repaired at their main base and is told of Dek and Thia's presence on Genna. Joined by a Weyland-Yutani team, Tessa begins searching for Dek's group, stumbling across his crashed ship and finding his lost equipment.

After discovering the remains of her team, Thia attempts to repair herself, revealing that Tessa and her team aim to capture the Kalisk, and she urges Dek to flee. Feeling betrayed, Dek challenges the Kalisk alone. The two fight, and though Dek manages to sever its head and tail, the Kalisk regenerates itself and subdues him. Unexpectedly, it spares him after smelling him, but Tessa and her team arrive; she captures both of them with cryogenic explosives.

Tessa reveals to Thia the Kalisk's regenerative powers could be a miracle for humanity. Tessa begins experimenting on Dek, and when Thia tries to intervene, Tessa orders her deactivation. However, Thia helps Dek escape. He comes across his crashed ship, heals his wounds, and uses Genna's natural environment to create improvised weapons. While searching for Thia, he reunites with Bud and realizes she is the child of the Kalisk, who had smelled her scent on him.

Dek and Bud infiltrate the Weyland-Yutani base, kill most of the guards, and free Thia. While Thia and Bud search for the Kalisk, Dek kills the remaining guards before being confronted by Tessa, who pilots a mech. The Kalisk, freed by Thia, joins the fight and swallows Tessa, who kills the creature from inside. As Tessa prepares to kill Thia, Dek stabs Tessa and Bud fully destroys her.

Sometime later, Dek returns home to Yautja Prime. He presents Tessa's skull to his father as a trophy and demands his own cloaking device as a reward, but Njohrr orders his bodyguards to kill Dek. Quickly dispatching the bodyguards, Dek challenges and defeats his father in a duel, restraining him with his own trap. Njohrr attempts to barter for his life by offering Dek a place in the clan. Dek rejects the offer and a now grown Bud bites Njohrr's head off, with Thia standing alongside her. Dek takes the cloaking device for himself and declares Bud and Thia as his clan. As a large Yautja ship appears on the horizon, Dek announces it is his mother's.

== Cast ==
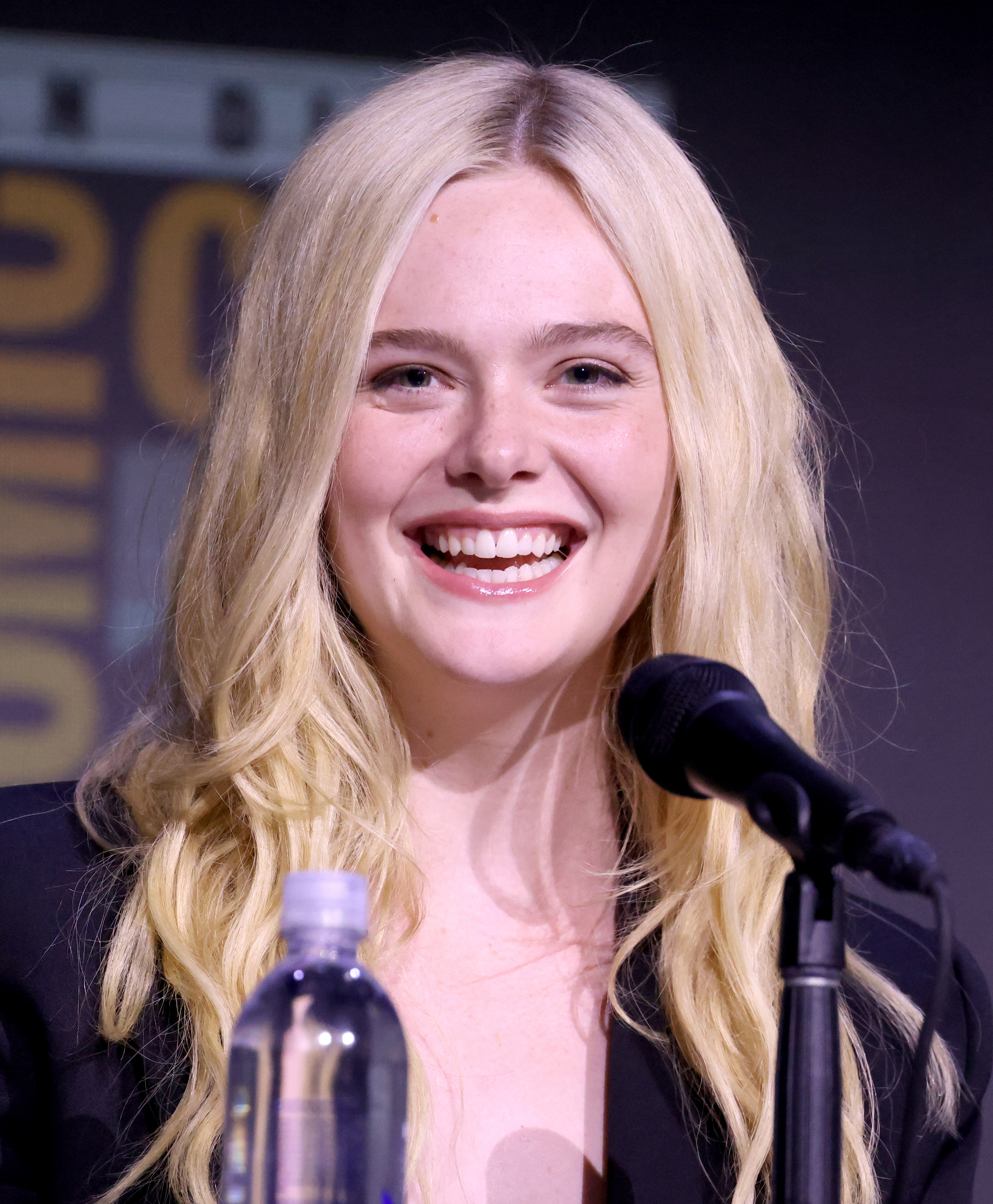
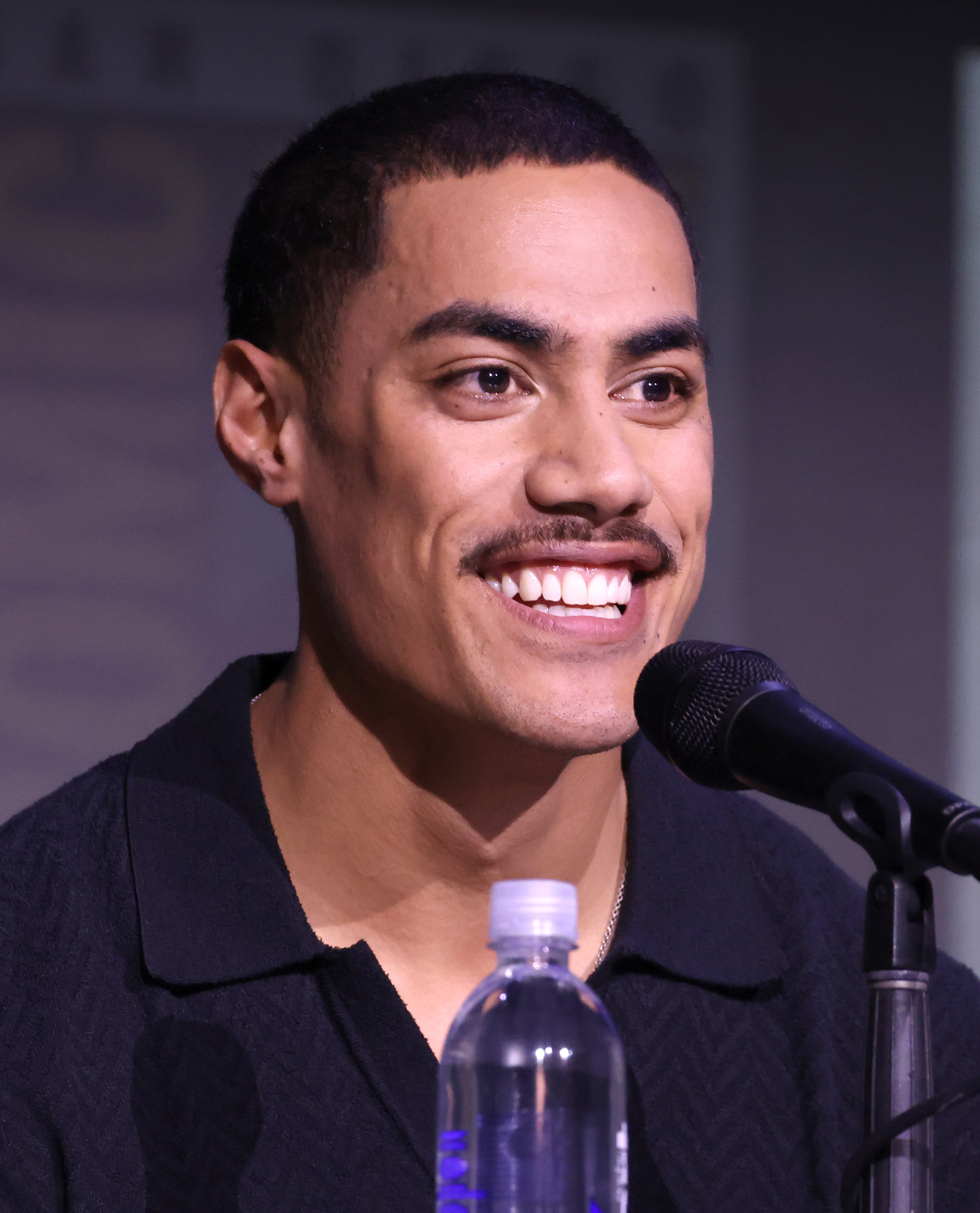
Elle Fanning (left) and Dimitrius Schuster-Koloamatangi promoting the film at the 2025 San Diego Comic-Con
- Elle Fanning as:
  - Thia, a damaged Weyland-Yutani Corporation synthetic who partners with Dek
  - Tessa, a Weyland-Yutani synthetic and Thia's "sister" who opposes her and Dek
- Dimitrius Schuster-Koloamatangi as Dek, a young Yautja outcast for being a runt
- Reuben de Jong as Njohrr, Dek and Kwei's father and leader of their clan, who believes Dek should be culled because he is a runt
  - Dimitrius Schuster-Koloamatangi as the voice of Njohrr
- Mike Homik as Kwei, Dek's protective older brother, who helps him prepare for his first hunt
  - Stefan Grube as the voice of Kwei
- Rohinal Narayan as Bud, a creature of the planet Genna
- Cameron Brown as Smyth and other male Weyland-Yutani drone synthetics
- Alison Wright as the voice of MU/TH/UR, the A.I. overseer of Weyland-Yutani and Tessa's superior

The Duffer Brothers provided the voice of the onboard computer for Kwei's ship. Trachtenberg was originally set to direct the third episode of Stranger Things 5, but was unable to when Badlands got greenlit for production.

== Production ==
In February 2024, it was revealed that a standalone film in the Predator franchise titled Badlands was in development, set to be directed by Dan Trachtenberg, who previously directed and co-wrote the story of Prey (2022) and Predator: Killer of Killers (2025), and co-written by Patrick Aison, who wrote Prey. Writers Brian Duffield, Bryan Fuller, Patrick Somerville, and Ben Schwartz are credited for "additional literary material (not on-screen)." The director cited stylistic and thematic influences from the works of Frank Frazetta and Terrence Malick, Conan the Barbarian, Drax the Destroyer, the films Shane (1953), Mad Max 2 (1981), The Book of Eli (2010), as well as Clint Eastwood Westerns, and the video game Shadow of the Colossus (2005). In June, Elle Fanning was in talks to join the film in a dual role, with her casting confirmed in August.

Drawing influence from the franchise's expanded universe, Badlands is intended to be a self-contained entry in the series, set on the Predators' homeworld and focusing on the culture of their species. To this end, a consistent written and verbal language for the Predators was developed for the film by linguist Britton Watkins. A substantial portion of the film's dialogue is the fictional Yautja language. In creating the language, Watkins drew influence from previous depictions of the Predators' language, but redesigned the language to have consistent rules of grammar: the Predators numerical system was influenced by the self destruct timer in the original 1987 Predator film, the written language from symbols seen in Aliens vs. Predator: Requiem (2007), and their spoken language from a brief depiction in The Predator (2018). Consideration was also made for the type of sound a Predator's mouth design could realistically make, as well as the Predators typical clicking noises.

The film adds the terms "Yautja" and "Yautja Prime" to the Predator film series to refer to the Predator species and their homeworld, respectively. These terms were introduced in the franchise's expanded universe, first appearing in the 1994 novel Aliens vs. Predator: Prey authored by S.D. Perry and Steve Perry, which itself was a spinoff of the Aliens vs. Predator comic book series published by Dark Horse Comics. In a departure from previous films, the Predator, Dek, is the protagonist rather than an antagonist. Dek is portrayed by stuntman Dimitrius Schuster-Koloamatangi, who also learned the Predator language specifically for the role. To create Dek's physical appearance, Studio Gillis designed a creature suit to portray Dek's body, while Dek's face was digitally enhanced using motion capture computer animation to convey more subtle emotional expression. Wētā Workshop also contributed to the film's practical effects and designs. The fictional Weyland-Yutani Corporation featured in the Alien franchise (and created by screenwriters Dan O'Bannon and Ronald Shusett for the 1979 film Alien) appears in the film.

Principal photography began in New Zealand by August 27, 2024, under the working title Backpack, and wrapped in late October. Jeff Cutter served as the cinematographer, after previously working with Trachtenberg on Prey. Olivier Dumont and Kathy Siegel served as the film's production visual effects supervisor and visual effects producer, respectively, creating the film's computer-generated imagery through visual effects vendors Industrial Light & Magic (ILM), Wētā FX, Rising Sun Pictures, Trixter, Important Looking Pirates, The Yard VFX, and Framestore. According to Trachtenberg, every shot of the film required visual effects work.

== Music ==
In October 2025, Sarah Schachner and Benjamin Wallfisch were revealed to have composed the musical score, having previously worked with Trachtenberg on Prey and Predator: Killer of Killers, respectively.

== Release ==
=== Theatrical ===
In June 2025, Disney announced that Predator: Badlands would receive a Hall H presentation at San Diego Comic-Con later that year. The film held its UK premiere at the BFI IMAX in London on October 28, 2025. It subsequently had its world premiere at the TCL Chinese Theatre on November 3, 2025, before being theatrically released in the United States on November 7, 2025, in RealD 3D and IMAX. Excluding Alien vs. Predator (2004), Predator: Badlands is the first film in the mainline Predator series to receive a PG-13 rating from the Motion Picture Association; all prior installments in the series were rated R. Producer Ben Rosenblatt justified the lower rating on the grounds that as the film has no human characters, the film can be violent while technically having no gore, as Predators have green blood, androids white blood, and the alien fauna purple blood.

=== Home media ===
Predator: Badlands was released on digital platforms on January 6, 2026, and was released on 4K Ultra HD Blu-ray, Blu-ray, and DVD on February 17, 2026.

In the United States, Predator: Badlands topped Fandango at Home's weekly digital sales and rental chart for the week ending January 11, following its premium digital release on January 6. The film remained in first place for the weeks ending January 18 and January 25. It subsequently remained within the top ten from the week ending February 1 through March 1. On physical media, the film debuted at No. 1 on Circana's VideoScan chart, which tracks combined sales of all disc formats, as well as on the dedicated Blu-ray sales chart, for the week ending February 21. It was also the top-selling title on the 4K Ultra HD disc format during the same week. For February 2026, the film placed No. 1 on the monthly physical media sales chart and No. 2 on the year-to-date chart through February.

Streaming analytics firm FlixPatrol, which monitors daily updated VOD charts and streaming ratings across the globe, reported that Predator: Badlands ranked No. 1 on the U.S. Apple TV chart for the week ending January 11. As of January 13, the film placed first on multiple on-demand platforms, including Amazon, Apple TV, and Vudu, and also held the top position in several international markets, including the United States, the United Kingdom, Australia, and Canada. On Hulu, the film recorded 9 million views during its first five days of streaming, becoming the platform's most-watched film premiere since Prey (2022). Nielsen Media Research, which records streaming viewership on certain U.S. television screens, announced that Predator: Badlands accumulated 587 million minutes of viewing time between February 9–15, ranking as the third most-streamed film during that period. The following week, between February 16–22, the film recorded 343 million minutes of viewing time, again placing third. Between February 23 and March 1, Predator: Badlands garnered 165 million minutes of viewing time, ranking ninth.

== Reception ==
=== Box office ===
Predator: Badlands grossed $91.1 million in the United States and Canada, and $93.5 million in other territories, for a worldwide total of $184.6 million.

In the United States and Canada, Predator: Badlands was released alongside Christy, Die My Love, Nuremberg and Sarah's Oil, and was initially projected to gross $25–30 million in its opening weekend. The film made $15.6 million on its first day (including $4.8 million from Wednesday and Thursday box office previews), rising estimates to $36–38 million, a record for the Predator franchise. It would end up debuting to $40 million at the domestic box office in its opening weekend, overtaking the previous franchise record held by Alien vs. Predator, which made $38 million in 2004. The film collected an additional $40 million from international markets, for a worldwide total debut of $80 million.

=== Critical response ===
On the review aggregator website Rotten Tomatoes, 86% of 277 critics' reviews are positive, with an average rating of 7.2/10. The website's consensus reads: "Director Dan Trachtenberg continues to take the Predator franchise in exciting new directions with Badlands, a rollicking adventure that transforms one of cinema's most iconic brutes into a hero worth rooting for." Metacritic, which uses a weighted average, assigned the film a score of 71 out of 100, based on 43 critics, indicating "generally favorable" reviews. Audiences polled by CinemaScore gave the film an average grade of A− on an A+ to F scale, the highest in the Predator franchise to date, and it received a 78% "definite recommend" on PostTrak.

Liz Shannon Miller of Consequence gave the film an "A−," stating that "Badlands flips the approach and finds something fresh and wonderful and bold as a result — as if James Cameron had made Terminator 2 entirely from the T-800's point of view." Tim Robey of The Telegraph gave the film 4 out of 5 stars, praising Badlands' ability to "humanise a film in which not a single human features." Not all reviews were positive however, with Hindustan Times reviewer Abhimanyu Mathur referring to the movie as a "bland" spin-off that "nobody asked for." Whilst supportive of the choice to focus on the runt of a litter, Mathur described Dek as a "whiny teenager," rather than as an "underdog," awarding Badlands 2 stars. Luca Fontana of Galaxus and Manohla Dargis of The New York Times also acknowledged Dek's reversed role as the prey, with the Kalisk instead becoming the underdog. Écran Large writer Geoffrey Crété described Badlands as a big leap from Trachtenberg's previous work in the franchise, describing the planet Genna as a "savage world," that is complemented by "high-quality visual effects." Crété criticized the characterization however, describing them as remaining "the same puppets serving the same eternal stories of identity quest and blended families." Giving the film 2 stars out of 5, Peter Bradshaw of The Guardian similarly criticized the characterization of Dek, putting his humanization down to "the service of narrative development," concluding that "it ceases to be the Predator."

Elle Fanning was described as a "sprightly breath of fresh air, winsomely cutting through the grit-and-honor stolidity of the Predator mindset" by Richard Lawson of The Hollywood Reporter, going on to say that her character "steers the film away from impossible bleakness." Dustin Rowles, reviewing for Pajiba, also praised Fanning's performance, referring to her as "the glue holding it all together," remarking on her performance as humorous, intelligent and including "jaw-dropping action scenes involving her detached legs." Matthew Turner of Nerdly gave special mention to Badlands screenwriter Patrick Aison for making Dek sympathetic to the audience before Thia's first appearance.

Meredith Loftus of Offscreen Central gave Badlands a B+ rating, stating that "the only aspect that will get any attention this awards season is the visual effects." ScreenCrush writer Matt Singer commended the design of Dek, remarking that "it looks so convincing that the viewer simply accepts it as a living, flesh-and-blood creature." David Crow, reviewing for Den of Geek, credited the performance of Schuster-Koloamatangi for being able to act despite heavy CGI and prosthetics, remarking that Dek "looks unconvincingly alien, but there is a more human tactile performance in those eyes," making a comparison to prior Predator franchise entries. IGN writer Clint Gage scored Badlands 8 out of 10, complimenting the creature design, comparing them to those seen in Avatar and describing Genna as an "alien death planet populated with ravenous flora and fauna." Variety writer Peter Debruge compared the plot of Badlands to a live-action version of the poem "Jabberwocky" by author Lewis Carroll, naming Badlands the strongest entry in the Predator franchise since the original. Alan Ng writing for Film Threat enjoyed the action sequences but criticized the story "for lacking deeper meaning."

=== Accolades ===
Award	Date of ceremony	Category	Recipient(s)	Result	Ref.
Austin Film Critics Association	December 18, 2025	Dual Threat Special Award	Elle Fanning	Honored (Note: This award does not have a single winner, but recognizes multiple individuals.)	
Critics' Choice Super Awards	August 6, 2026	Best Science Fiction/Fantasy Movie	Predator: Badlands	Nominated	
Critics' Choice Super Awards	August 6, 2026	Best Actress in a Science Fiction/Fantasy Movie	Elle Fanning	Nominated	
Fangoria Chainsaw Awards	October 25, 2026	Best Supporting Performance	Elle Fanning	Nominated	
Fangoria Chainsaw Awards	October 25, 2026	Best Creature FX	Studio Gillis and Wētā Workshop	Nominated	
Golden Trailer Awards	May 28, 2026	Best Sound Editing in a TV Spot	"Silence Your Phones" (The Walt Disney Studios / Tiny Hero)	Nominated	
Las Vegas Film Critics Society	December 19, 2025	Best Stunts	Predator: Badlands	Nominated	
Las Vegas Film Critics Society	December 19, 2025	Best Action Film	Predator: Badlands	Nominated	
Saturn Awards	March 8, 2026	Best Science Fiction Film	Predator: Badlands	Nominated	
Saturn Awards	March 8, 2026	Best Film Direction	Dan Trachtenberg	Nominated	
Saturn Awards	March 8, 2026	Best Actress in a Film	Elle Fanning	Won	
Saturn Awards	March 8, 2026	Best Film Editing	Stefan Grube and Dave Trachtenberg	Nominated	
Saturn Awards	March 8, 2026	Best Film Costume Design	Ngila Dickson	Nominated	
Seattle Film Critics Society	December 15, 2025	Best Action Choreography	Jacob Tomuri	Nominated	
Seattle Film Critics Society	December 15, 2025	Best Visual Effects	Olivier Dumont, Alec Gillis, Sheldon Stopsack, and Karl Rapley	Nominated	
Taurus World Stunt Awards	February 22, 2026	Best Stunt Rigging	Matthew Campbell, James McCready, Nooroa Poa, Vega Poa, and Beau Weston	Nominated	

== Comic book ==
A tie-in prequel comic book, set shortly before the events of the movie, written by Ethan Sacks and illustrated by Elvin Ching, was published on November 12, 2025, by Marvel Comics.

== Future ==
In an interview in the July 2025 SFX magazine, Trachtenberg stated he had three initial Predator films in mind to make: Predator: Killer of Killers, Predator: Badlands, and a third that he intends to direct if Predator: Badlands is successful. Discussions are ongoing with original franchise star Arnold Schwarzenegger about reprising his role as Dutch in a future installment. In a January 2023 interview, Prey star Amber Midthunder said the cast of that film was in talks with Trachtenberg for a sequel.
