= Predator: Killer of Killers =

2025 film by Dan Trachtenberg

- Promotional release poster
- Directed by: Dan Trachtenberg
- Screenplay by: Micho Robert Rutare
- Story by: Dan Trachtenberg; Micho Robert Rutare
- Based on: Characters by: Jim Thomas; John Thomas
- Produced by: John Davis; Dan Trachtenberg; Marc Toberoff; Ben Rosenblatt
- Starring: Lindsay LaVanchy; Louis Ozawa; Rick Gonzalez; Michael Biehn
- Edited by: Stefan Grube
- Music by: Benjamin Wallfisch
- Production companies: 20th Century Animation; Lawrence Gordon Productions; Davis Entertainment; Toberoff Entertainment
- Distributed by: Hulu
- Release date: June 6, 2025
- Running time: 85 minutes
- Country: United States
- Languages: English; Japanese; Old Norse; Spanish
- Budget: $50 million

Predator: Killer of Killers is a 2025 American animated science fiction horror film directed by Dan Trachtenberg from a screenplay by Micho Robert Rutare, based on a story by Trachtenberg and Rutare. It is the sixth installment in the Predator franchise and its first animated installment.

By October 2024, Trachtenberg, who previously directed Prey (2022), had made a secret film in the franchise, set to be released prior to Predator: Badlands (2025). In April 2025, the film's title and release date were revealed. Animation was provided by The Third Floor.

Predator: Killer of Killers was released on June 6, 2025, in the United States on Hulu and internationally on Disney+. The film received positive reviews from critics, with praise for its animation, Trachtenberg's direction, writing, action sequences, musical score, and voice cast.

== Plot ==
=== The Shield ===
In Karelia in the year 841, Viking warrior Ursa leads her son Anders and their clan on an expedition to destroy the Krivich tribe and their leader, Zoran, who forced Ursa to kill her own father, Einar, the previous Earl of Ladoga, when she was a child. They slaughter Zoran's clan, and Ursa confronts him in his fortress. Initially unable to recognize Ursa, Zoran mocks her for her father's death before Anders beheads him. Immediately after the battle, a Predator ambushes the group with a sonic weapon, killing Ursa's clan members one by one and seriously injuring Anders. Ursa manages to defeat and kill the Predator after a fierce underwater duel, but Anders succumbs to his wounds and dies in her arms.

=== The Sword ===
In 1609 in Japan, brothers Kenji and Kiyoshi, sons of a samurai warlord, are ordered to duel to determine their father's successor. Kenji refuses to fight, but Kiyoshi attacks and defeats him, scarring his face; disgraced, Kenji flees. Twenty years later, with their father having died, Kiyoshi has become lord of the region, while Kenji has lived in exile as a shinobi. Kenji returns to confront his brother, unaware that a Predator is hunting him. He stealthily infiltrates his brother's castle and defeats Kiyoshi in a sword fight, paying him back for scarring his face by doing the same to him. After Kiyoshi falls into the castle's moat, the Predator ambushes Kenji and kills the remaining guards. Kenji escapes and rescues the injured Kiyoshi, and they briefly clash before the Predator arrives and mortally injures the latter. The brothers join forces and succeed in killing the Predator, and Kenji comforts his brother before he dies of his wounds.

=== The Bullet ===
In 1942, John J. Torres is drafted into the U.S. Navy as a mechanic under the command of Captain "Vandy" Vandenburg. During the North African campaign, his squadron investigates a mysterious aircraft that destroyed another unit and has been attacking the Allies. Taking a battered Grumman F4F Wildcat, he attempts to warn the others, but arrives too late as his squadron is systematically slaughtered by a Predator fighter pilot in an starship until only he and Vandy remain. Vandy sacrifices himself to buy time for Torres, who outmaneuvers the Predator and tricks it into destroying itself with a harpoon; after falling into the water, he fires a flare and is presumably saved by a rescue team. Sometime after World War II ends, Torres is working in his garage, having finished his service and been rewarded with a medal before he is abducted by another Predator ship that leaves behind crop circles in the field.

=== Epilogue ===
Awakening aboard the ship, Torres is thrown into a prison cell alongside Ursa and Kenji, all three having been placed in suspended animation by the Predators after having killed their respective Predators, although they all find that they cannot communicate due to a language barrier. (Note: As depicted in Predator: The Preserve (2023) and Predator: The Last Hunt (2024).) They are all fitted with explosive collars, taken to a gladiatorial arena on an arid, desert alien world, and presented to a Predator warlord Ursa calls the "Grendel King," who commands them to fight to the death, with the winner to fight him. Ursa initially attacks Torres and Kenji, but they convince her to join forces and escape. The Grendel King unleashes a massive alien beast into the arena, which swallows Torres. Ursa and Kenji work together to kill the creature and Torres escapes, stealing a hoverbike and deactivating the explosive collars when the Grendel King attempts to kill them. Finally deciding to work together, the three flee toward the Grendel King's spaceship, although the Grendel King destroys the hoverbike with a thrown bone ax.

Ursa and Kenji battle the Grendel King and badly damage him while Torres tries to figure out how to fly his ship. The Grendel King gains the upper hand against the two warriors and nearly kills them, but Torres uses the engines to blast the Grendel King away; as they attempt to flee, the Grendel King severs Kenji's right arm with a thrown spear and Predator soldiers ground the ship with a harpoon launcher. Telling Torres and Kenji not to avenge her, Ursa uses her shield to slide down the harpoon cable and destroy the launcher, sacrificing herself to let the others escape as the Grendel King rallies his tribe to pursue the fugitives. Ursa is placed back in suspended animation and stored alongside other captives (human and alien alike) that have also killed Predators, including Naru, (Note: As depicted in Prey (2022).) Mike Harrigan, (Note: As depicted in Predator 2 (1990). This appearance is only in the film's extended cut.) and Alan "Dutch" Schaefer. (Note: As depicted in Predator (1987). This appearance is only in the film's extended cut.)

== Voice cast ==
- Lindsay LaVanchy as Ursa, an aggressive, violent and temperamental 9th century Scandinavian Viking hunter who seeks vengeance on a warlord who killed her father.
  - Cherami Leigh as young Ursa
- Louis Ozawa Changchien as Kenji Kawakami, a stoic and quiet 17th century Japanese shinobi who is the disgraced son of a samurai warlord; and Kiyoshi Kawakami, Kenji's ambitious samurai brother who succeeds him as their father's successor. Ozawa previously portrayed the yakuza enforcer Hanzō in Predators.
- Rick Gonzalez as John J. Torres, a cheery and upbeat 20th century Latino mechanic who is drafted as an Allied fighter pilot during World War 2.
- Michael Biehn as Vandenberg "Vandy", a fighter pilot and the commander of the Texas Aces, who serves as Torres's mentor.
- Doug Cockle as Einar, Ursa's father and the Earl of Ladoga who was killed long ago by Zoran.
- Damien Haas as Anders, Ursa's young son and Einar's grandson.
- Lauren Holt as Freya, one of Ursa's Viking warriors and the only other named female member in her tribe.
- Jeff Leach as Ivar, a bald Viking warrior who wields an axe.
- Piotr Michael as Gunnar, a Viking warrior who wears wolf pelt clothing.
- Andrew Morgado as Chief Zoran, a powerful Krivich chieftain who killed and then usurped Einar, and the target of Ursa's revenge.
- Alessa Luz Martinez as Delgado, a young World War 2 mechanic who is friends with Torres.
- Felix Solis as Mr. Torres, Torres's strict father who works as a mechanic. He initially does not allow his son to serve as a pilot because he thinks his son abuses his vehicles' functions without concern.
- Britton Watkins as the Yautja warlord dubbed the "Grendel King", the ruthless leader of a Yautja war band who kidnaps powerful warriors from all walks of life and time periods and pits them against each other in combat to find the most powerful being in the galaxy.

The uncredited animated likenesses of Amber Midthunder, Danny Glover and Arnold Schwarzenegger are featured at the film's conclusion, representing Naru from Prey, Mike Harrigan from Predator 2 and Dutch Schaefer from Predator respectively.

== Production ==
In October 2024, during an interview with The Hollywood Reporter, 20th Century Studios president Steve Asbell revealed that Prey (2022) director Dan Trachtenberg had written, directed and made a secret film in the Predator franchise, that would be released prior to his other announced Predator film, Predator: Badlands (2025). In April 2025, the film was revealed to be animated and officially titled Predator: Killer of Killers, with Lindsay LaVanchy, Louis Ozawa Changchien, Rick Gonzalez, and Michael Biehn leading the cast. Changchien previously portrayed Hanzo Kawakami in Predators (2010).

Production included Micho Robert Rutare serving as screenwriter, while the productions were created simultaneously. Benjamin Wallfisch serves as the film's composer, marking his first composition for an animated film. The soundtrack was released on June 6, 2025. The film was animated using Unreal Engine, one of the first feature films to do so, and drew stylistic influences from Katsuhiro Otomo’s Akira (1988) and Netflix's Arcane (2021–2024), aiming to embrace both stylized violence and visual spectacle in ways Trachtenberg felt would be less effective in live-action. Several artists from Arcane contributed to the production, including lead character animator Steven J. Meyer. Trachtenberg also cited Christopher Guest's Best in Show (2000) as a structural inspiration, aiming for emotional ambiguity by encouraging empathy with all three protagonists.

Trachtenberg and the animation team sought to make each Predator antagonist distinct, wanting individuals of their species to be "as varied, at least, as we are." In doing so, Trachtenberg hoped to avoid the Star Wars trope in which all individuals of a species look identical: "I get a little bored when we see Kashyyyk, the Wookiee planet or whatever, and they're all just a bunch of Chewbaccas. Some have a little bit of a gray fur and some of them [don't], but they're all basically just Chewbacca, just standing around being Wookiees."

On July 25, 2025, an extended cut of the film was released, which adds the characters Dutch Schaefer from Predator (1987) and Mike Harrigan from Predator 2 (1990) to the suspended animation chambers at end of the film.

== Music ==
Benjamin Wallfisch serves as the film's composer, marking his first composition for an animated film. The soundtrack was released on June 6, 2025.

== Release ==
=== Streaming ===
Predator: Killer of Killers was released on June 6, 2025, on Hulu and Disney+ and outside of the United States via the Star hub. On July 25, 2025, an extended ending was added to the film which features the return of Arnold Schwarzenegger as Dutch Schaefer and Danny Glover as Mike Harrigan.

== Reception ==
=== Viewership ===
Streaming analytics firm FlixPatrol, which monitors daily updated VOD charts and streaming ratings across the globe, reported that Predator: Killer of Killers was the top streaming film on Hulu the day following its release on the platform. JustWatch, a guide to streaming content with access to data from more than 45 million users around the world, estimated that Predator: Killer of Killers was the third most-streamed film in the U.S. from June 9–15.

=== Critical response ===
On the review aggregator website Rotten Tomatoes, 95% of 110 critics' reviews are positive, with an average rating of 7.7/10. The website's consensus reads: "Plunking the Predator into a series of inspired matchups with a striking visual palette, Killer of Killers is a lean, mean, and just plain awesome addition to the iconic sci-fi franchise." Metacritic, which uses a weighted average, assigned the film a score of 78 out of 100, based on 18 critics, indicating "generally favorable" reviews.

Toussaint Egan of The A.V. Club praised the film's "frenetic violence and novel cinematography" and efficient storytelling with "little to no fat". Writing for IndieWire, David Ehrlich called it "an awesomely violent and artfully staged piece of animated pulp" that answers burning questions like, "Who would win in a fight: a Predator or a ninja? What about a Predator or a Viking?" Jim Vorel of Paste criticized the film's "iffy animation" but described its story as "pulpy sci-fi goodness that longtime series fans have likely been craving". In a mixed review, Catherine Bray of The Guardian also described the animation as lacking a "spark of life and ingenuity", speculating that AI might have been used. In Screen Rant, Grant Hermann criticized the film's ending as "a blatant setup for a sequel [that] actively ruined much of my love for Prey". Aidan Kelley of Collider, in contrast, praised the final segment as pleasantly surprising and setting up interesting future developments in "a new golden age for the Predator franchise".

=== Accolades ===
Award	Date of ceremony	Category	Recipient(s)	Result	Ref.
New York Film Critics Online	December 15, 2025	Best Animation	Predator: Killer of Killers	Nominated	
San Diego Film Critics Society	December 15, 2025	Best Animated Film	Predator: Killer of Killers	Nominated	
Kansas City Film Critics Circle	December 21, 2025	Best Animated Feature	Predator: Killer of Killers	Nominated	

== See also ==
- Grendel – a character in the Anglo-Saxon epic poem Beowulf
