= Dimitrius Schuster-Koloamatangi =

Aotearoa (New Zealand) actor (born 2001)

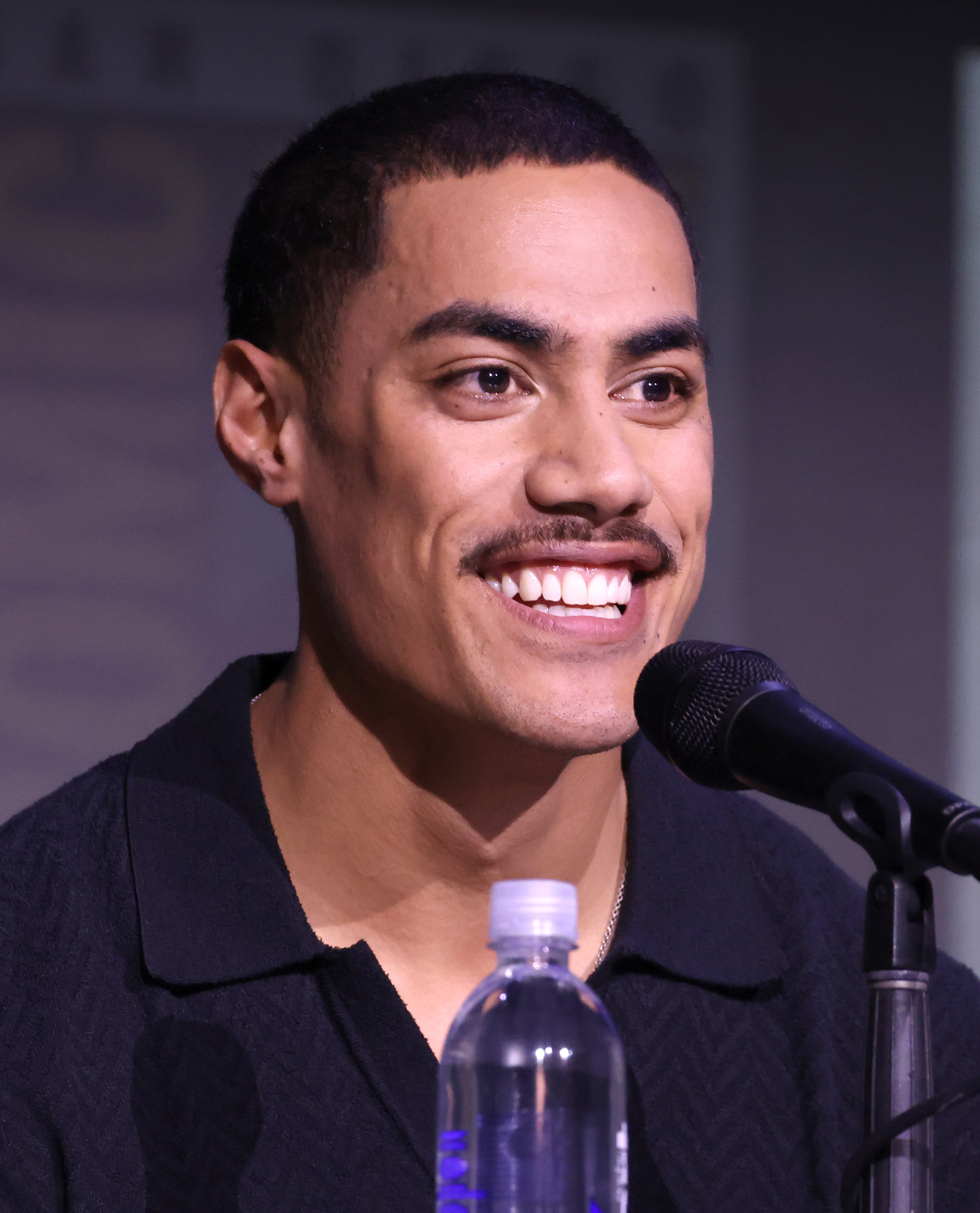
- Schuster-Koloamatangi in 2025
- Born: Dimitrius Schuster-Koloamatangi; 6 February 2001 (age 25); Auckland, New Zealand
- Education: St Peter's College; Auckland University of Technology (AUT)
- Occupation: Actor
- Years active: 2019–present

Dimitrius Schuster-Koloamatangi (born 6 February 2001) is a New Zealand actor.

== Early life ==
Schuster-Koloamatangi was born on 6 February 2001 in Auckland, New Zealand to a Samoan mother and a Tongan father.

== Filmography ==
=== Film ===
Year	Title	Role	Notes
2023	Red, White & Brass	Veni	
2025	Predator: Badlands	Dek	
TBA	God Bless You, Mr. Kopu †	Mafu	Post-production
TBA	Whyte Christmas †		Filming

=== Television ===
- Jonah (2019) as Drew
- The Panthers (2021) as Will 'Ilolahia
- Upright S2 (2022) as Jaxon
