= Dane DiLiegro =

American actor and basketball player

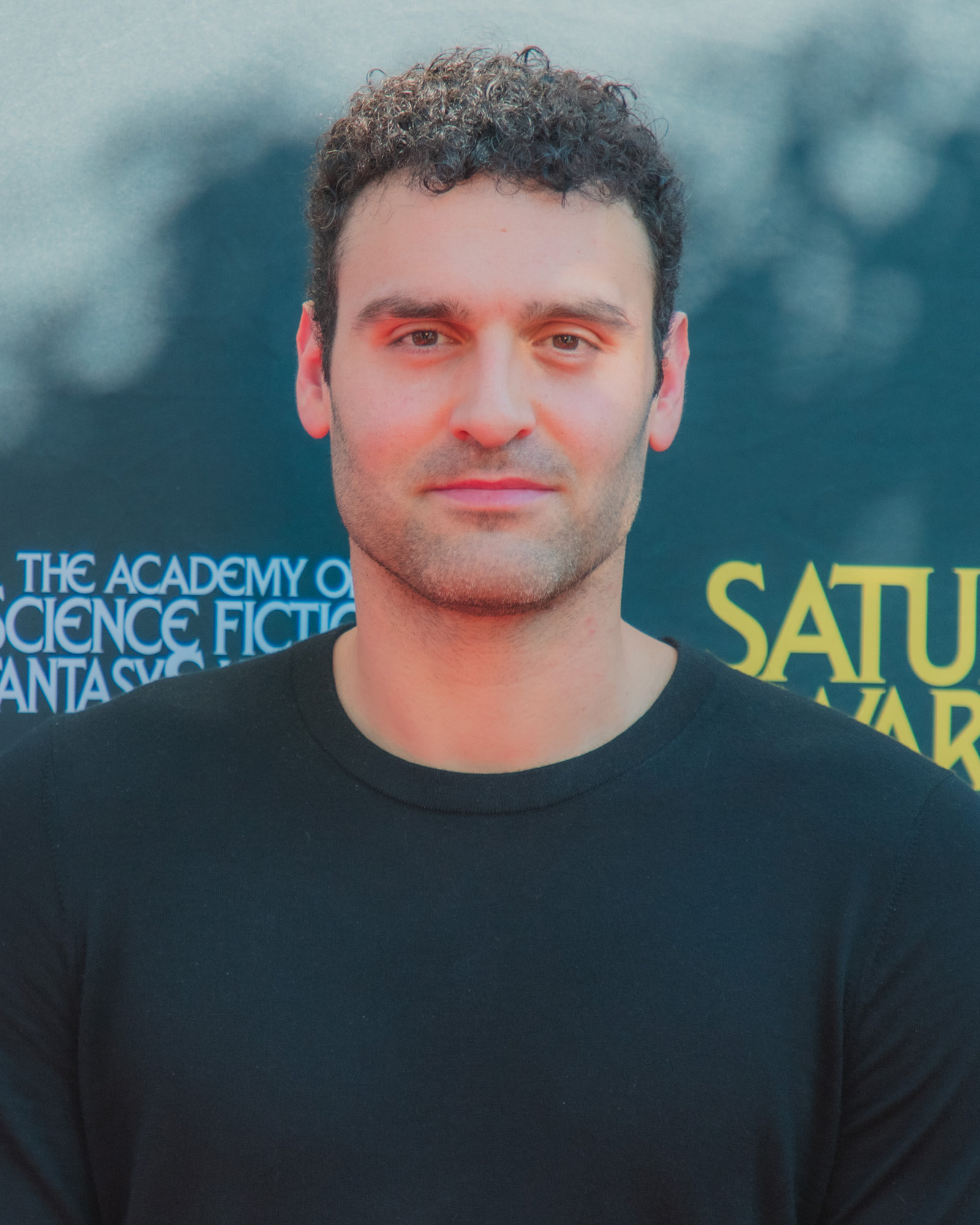
- DiLiegro in 2026
- Born: Dane Robert DiLiegro; August 6, 1988 (age 38); Lexington, Massachusetts, U.S.
- Citizenship: United States, Italy
- Occupations: Actor, Basketball player
- Years active: 2007–2019 (basketball); 2019–present (acting)
- Basketball career

Personal information
- Listed height: 6 ft 8 in (2.03 m)
- Listed weight: 245 lb (111 kg)

Career information
- High school: Lexington (Lexington, Massachusetts); Worcester Academy (Worcester, Massachusetts)
- College: New Hampshire (2007–2011)
- NBA draft: 2011: undrafted
- Playing career: 2007–2019
- Position: Center / power forward
- Number: 1, 7, 12, 24

Career history
- 2011–2012: Assi Basket Ostuni
- 2012–2013: Dinamo Sassari
- 2013–2014: Pallacanestro Trieste
- 2014–2015: Hapoel Gilboa Galil
- 2015–2016: Mens Sana 1871 Basket
- 2016–2017: Scaligera Verona
- 2017–2019: Pallacanestro Forlì 2.015

Dane Robert DiLiegro (/dɪleɪɡroʊ/ dill-EGG-row; born August 6, 1988) is an American actor and former professional basketball player. DiLiegro played professional basketball for eight seasons for teams in Italy and Israel. DiLiegro has appeared in productions such as Only Murders in the Building, Running Point, and American Horror Stories, and starred as the Feral Predator in the 2022 film Prey.

== Early life and education ==
DiLiegro was born in Lexington, Massachusetts, on August 6, 1988, to Cheryl DiLiegro (née Moll), an artist and calligrapher, and Frank DiLiegro, an early employee at Nike. He attended Lexington High School, where he played football and basketball, and later Worcester Academy. DiLigero has admitted that he neither cared for nor was ever great at sports at a young age. He got serious about basketball only at age 15 and did not make the varsity of his high school team until his junior year.

== Career ==
=== Basketball ===
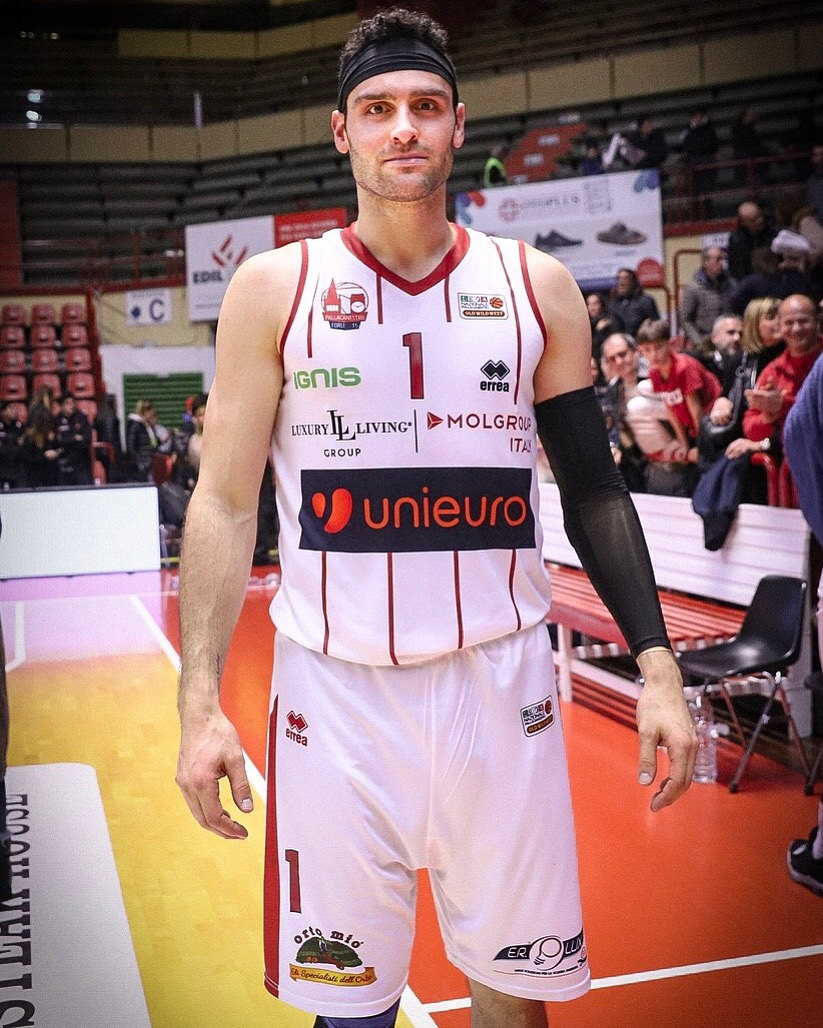
Dane DiLiegro after a game in Forli, 2019

After graduating from Lexington High School in 2006, DiLiegro went on to spend a year at Worcester Academy, where he refined his skills as a basketball player in the school's postgraduate program. He averaged 11 points, 10 rebounds, and 4 blocks at Worcester. This led to DiLiegro receiving a full athletic scholarship to play at the University of New Hampshire.

As a four-year starter for the New Hampshire Wildcats from 2007 to 2011, DiLiegro found his place on the team through defense, rebounding, and outworking his opponents. He graduated from UNH in May 2011 with the second-highest number of rebounds in program history. DiLiegro made ESPN's Top Ten plays of the day on February 19, 2009, for a dunk.

After going undrafted in the 2011 NBA draft, DiLiegro went on to play in Europe, being a part of Assi Basket Ostuni, (Ostuni, Italy), Dinamo Sassari (Sassari, Sardinia, Italy), Pallacanestro Trieste (Trieste, Italy), Hapoel Gilboa Galil, (Gan Ner, Israel), Mens Sana 1871 Basket (Siena, Italy), Tezenis Verona (Verona, Italy), and Pallacanestro Forlì (Forlì, Italy).

DiLiegro won a gold medal with Team USA as a basketball player at the 18th Maccabiah Games in 2009 in Israel.

=== Acting ===
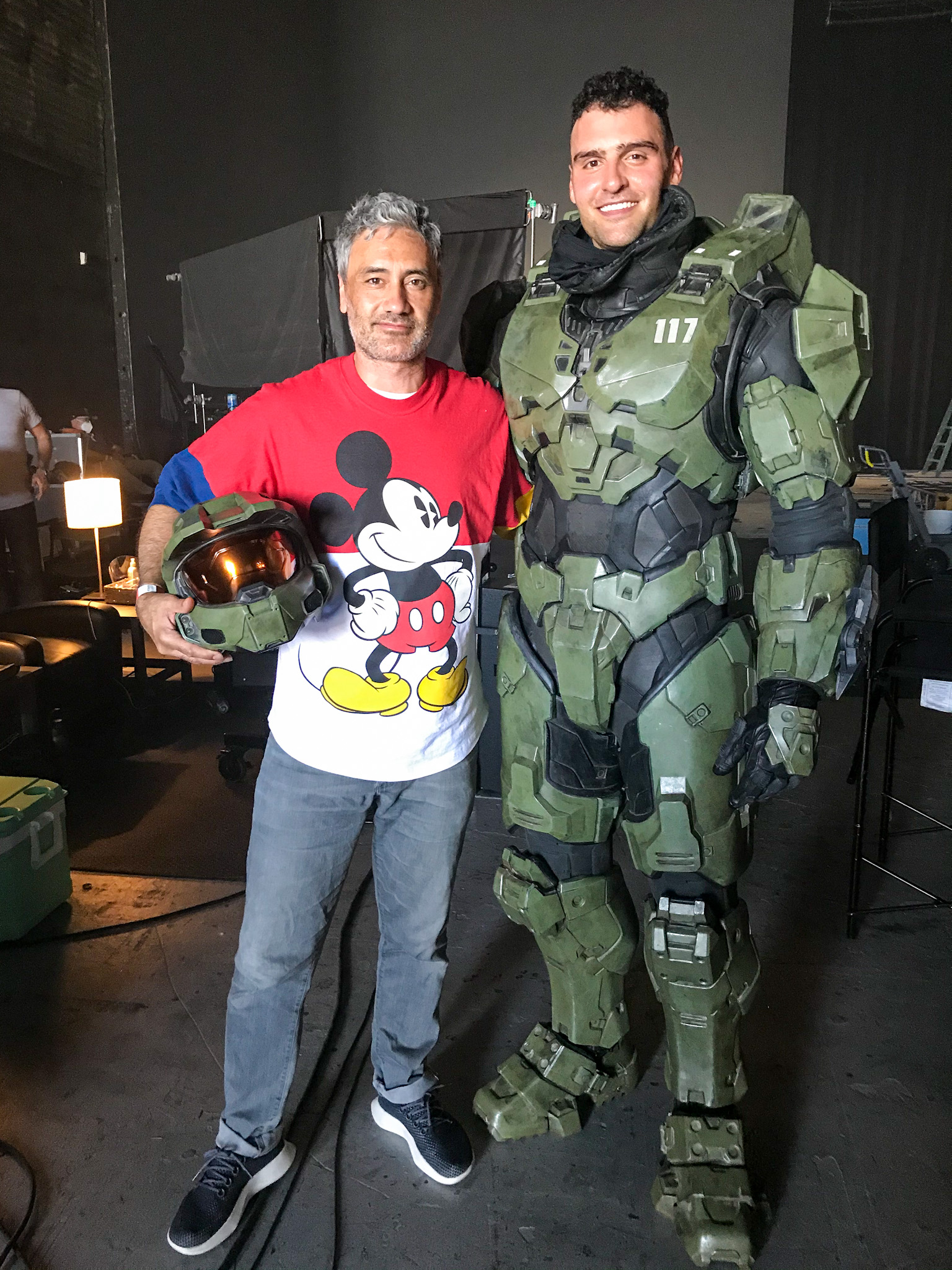
Dane DiLiegro and Taika Waititi on set while shooting an Xbox production

In 2019, DiLiegro was invited to work as a stand-in on Free Guy, which was filming in his native Boston. While on the set, stunt coordinator Chris O'Hara suggested to DiLiegro to look into acting. Just two weeks later, DiLiegro was cast to play Protein in the Netflix show Sweet Home. The role required him to wear a foam latex suit weighing 80 pounds. He followed it by playing Master Chief in an Xbox commercial. In 2021, he portrayed the titular character Ba'al in the fifth episode of American Horror Stories. He starred as the main antagonist in the 2022 Doja Cat music video for "Get Into It (Yuh)". DiLiegro appeared in the Tom DeLonge-directed Monsters of California.

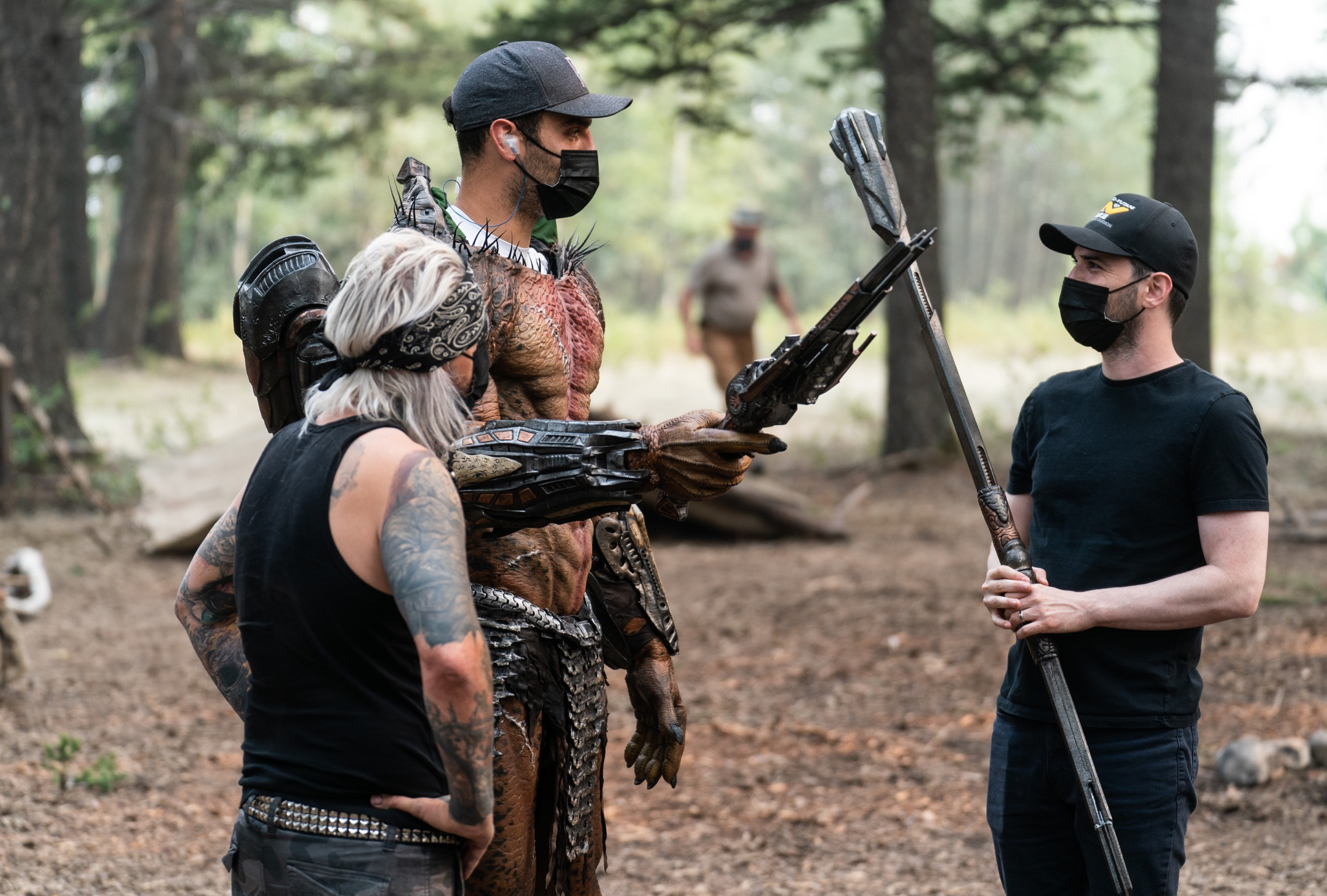
Dane DiLiegro and Dan Trachtenberg discuss a scene while shooting Prey.

He stars in the Predator film Prey as the Predator; He performed all the acting, stunts and motion capture of the creature. Prior to filming, he lost 25 pounds and spent months training parkour, martial arts and strengthening his neck due to the new design of the Predator, which sat the 15 pound animatronic head on top of his head, forcing him to shoot every scene essentially blind.

In 2022, Comic Book Resources named DiLiegro among the top ten monster actors of all time.

DiLiegro appeared in the 2023 Marvel film Guardians of the Galaxy Vol. 3. In 2024, DiLiegro starred in the Blumhouse film Imaginary as the final antagonist, Chauncey Bear. DiLiegro also appeared in the Lucasfilm production, Star Wars: Skeleton Crew.

DiLiegro appears in the series Running Point, as a recurring character Badrag Knauss, a Slovenian player who, although massive in stature and at times quite blunt, often surprises the team with his thoughtfulness. The series premiered in 2025 and is penned by Mindy Kaling, Ike Barinholtz, and David Stassen, for Netflix. He has a role in season five of Only Murders in the Building.

== Personal life ==
DiLiegro resides in Los Angeles. His father is of Italian descent, with roots in Gaeta and Canosa di Puglia, and his mother is Jewish. He holds American and Italian citizenships, and is Jewish.

DiLiegro's father played basketball and wrestled at the University of New Hampshire, and his brother played basketball for the Syracuse Orange from 2003 to 2007.

Starting in 2016, in his off time, DiLiegro served as an apprentice under famed Tuscan butcher Dario Cecchini for multiple years; they maintained a close friendship after. As of 2019, DiLiegro hosts a culinary travel series on YouTube called Adventure Monday.

In August 2022, DiLiegro officiated the wedding of his friend, Kelly Olynyk.

== Filmography ==
=== Film ===
Key
†	Denotes films that have not yet been released

Year	Title	Role	Director	Notes
2022	Prey	The Predator	Dan Trachtenberg	
2023	Guardians of the Galaxy Vol. 3	Unsavory Octopus	James Gunn	
2023	Monsters of California	Bigfoot	Tom Delonge	
2023	Stay Out	Graham	Jared Safier	
2024	Imaginary	Chauncey	Jeff Wadlow	
2024	V/H/S/Beyond	Stork	Jordan Downey	Segment: "Stork"
2024	Werewolves	Lead Wolf	Steven Miller	
2026	River	The Man	Josh Giuliano	
2027	Seasons †	TBA	Drew Hancock	

=== Television ===
Year	Title	Role	Notes
2020	Sweet Home	Protein	2 episodes
2020	The Walking Dead	Hero Walker	Episode: "A Certain Doom"
2021	Side Hustle	Zeke	Episode: "Jag-Jitsu"
2021	American Horror Stories	Ba'al	2 episodes
2022	The Quest	Dragior	Episode: "The Weight of the World"
2023	That Girl Lay Lay	Kevin	Episode: "The Packer Packer Bowl"
2024	Skeleton Crew	Greasy	Episode: "Way, Way Out Past the Barrier"
2025	Cóyotl	Cimerron	Guest star
2025	Running Point	Badrag Knauss	8 episodes – Guest Star
2025	Only Murders in the Building	Johnny Caccimelio	4 episodes – Guest Star

=== Music video ===
Year	Title	Role	Director	Artist
2020	"Blackout"	Beelzebub	Ian Rowe	Mothica
2022	"Get Into It (Yuh)"	Alien Overlord	Mike Diva	Doja Cat
2023	"Headspace/Bent"	Habib	Kate Arizmendi	Benjamin Earl Turner

=== Commercial ===
Year	Title	Role	Director	Notes
2020	Lucid Odyssey	Master Chief	Taika Waititi	Xbox
2023	No Sweat	Basketball Player	Max Gutierrez	Draft Kings
