= Mike Homik =

New Zealand basketball player

Personal information
- Born: 6 July 1978 (age 48) Hamilton, New Zealand
- Listed height: 204 cm (6 ft 8 in)
- Listed weight: 115 kg (254 lb)

Career information
- High school: St John's College (Hamilton, New Zealand)
- College: West Valley JC (1997–1999); College of Idaho (2000–2002)
- Playing career: 1996–2015
- Position: Power forward

Career history
- 1996–1997: Waikato Warriors
- 2003–2005: Auckland Stars
- 2003–2004: New Zealand Breakers
- 2006: Harbour Heat
- 2007–2010: Waikato Pistons
- 2007–2008: Perth Wildcats
- 2011–2012: Manawatu Jets
- 2013: Wellington Saints
- 2015: Manawatu Jets

Career highlights
- 4× NZNBL champion (2004, 2005, 2008, 2009)
Medals
Men's basketball
Representing New Zealand
Commonwealth Games
Silver medal – second place	2006 Melbourne	Team competition

Michael George Homik (born 6 July 1978) is a New Zealand former basketball player. He played 14 seasons in the National Basketball League (NZNBL) and won four championships. He also played for the Tall Blacks and won a silver medal at the 2006 Commonwealth Games.

== Early life ==
Homik was born and raised in Hamilton, New Zealand, where he attended St John's College.

== Basketball career ==
In 1996, Homik debuted in the NBL for the Waikato Warriors. He played seven games in both 1996 and 1997, before moving to the United States for college. He played two seasons of college basketball for West Valley College before transferring to Albertson College of Idaho.

Homik returned from the United States in 2003 and joined the Auckland Stars. He later joined the New Zealand Breakers for their inaugural season in the Australian NBL in 2003/04. In 2004 and 2005, he was a member of the Stars' back-to-back championship teams.

For the 2006 New Zealand NBL season, Homik played for the Harbour Heat. He went on to spend the next four NBL seasons playing for the Waikato Pistons, including winning championships in 2008 and 2009. During this time, he played a second season in the Australian NBL, this time with the Perth Wildcats in 2007/08.

For the 2011 New Zealand NBL season, Homik joined the Manawatu Jets. However, he played just two games after suffering a broken left ankle. He re-joined the Jets for the 2012 season.

For the 2013 New Zealand NBL season, Homik played for the Wellington Saints.

In April 2015, Homik had a one-game stint with the Manawatu Jets to help them deal with numerous injuries.

== Personal life ==
Off the basketball court, Homik has been a stunt man in films such as The Hobbit as well as various television commercials. In 2016, Homik played the role of a villain in the Bollywood film Mohenjo Daro starring Hrithik Roshan. He also played the role of Kwei in the 2025 film Predator: Badlands.
