= Commando (1985 film) =

1985 American action film by Mark L. Lester

- Theatrical release poster
- Directed by: Mark L. Lester
- Screenplay by: Steven E. de Souza
- Story by: Jeph Loeb (Note: Credited as "Joseph Loeb III."); Matthew Weisman; Steven E. de Souza
- Produced by: Joel Silver
- Starring: Arnold Schwarzenegger; Rae Dawn Chong
- Cinematography: Matthew F. Leonetti
- Edited by: Mark Goldblatt; Glenn Farr; John F. Link
- Music by: James Horner
- Production company: Silver Pictures
- Distributed by: 20th Century Fox
- Release date: October 4, 1985
- Running time: 90 minutes
- Country: United States
- Languages: English; Spanish
- Budget: $10 million
- Box office: $57.5 million

Commando is a 1985 American action film directed by Mark L. Lester and produced by Joel Silver. It stars Arnold Schwarzenegger and Rae Dawn Chong and follows the retired United States Army Special Forces colonel who attempts to find his abducted daughter at the hands of his former subordinates. The musical score was composed by James Horner.

Commando was released in the United States by 20th Century Fox on October 4, 1985, where it received praise for the action sequences and humor. The film became a commercial success at the box office and was nominated for a Saturn Award for Best Special Effects, but lost to Back to the Future.

== Plot ==
In upstate California, former United States Army Special Forces colonel John Matrix is informed by his former superior Major General Franklin Kirby that unknown mercenaries have killed all the other members of his former unit. The assassins attack Matrix's secluded mountain home and kidnap his young daughter, Jenny. While trying to intercept them, Matrix is tranquilized and abducted by the mercenaries, led by Bennett, an ex-member of Matrix's team discharged for excessive violence.

Bennett had faked his death and is now working with the mercenaries as revenge against the latter. Matrix is taken before their commander, Ernesto Arius, a former South American dictator whom Matrix removed from power. Arius blackmails Matrix into carrying out a political assassination in his home country of Val Verde, where he wishes to lead a military coup.

With Jenny's life on the line, Matrix seemingly agrees to fulfill the demand. After boarding a flight to Val Verde, Matrix kills his guard, Henriques, and jumps off the plane just as it is taking off. Realizing that Arius will kill Jenny, regardless of whether or not he does the job, and approximately 11 hours before the plane is scheduled to land, Matrix sets out after Arius's associate, Sully. Matrix enlists the aid of an off-duty flight attendant named Cindy, whom he saw Sully harass, and instructs her to follow Sully to a shopping mall.

Cindy initially assumes that Matrix is a madman, but after seeing Sully pull a gun on Matrix in the ensuing shootout during which Sully's contact is killed, she promises to assist him in his endeavor. After a lengthy car chase, Matrix catches up with Sully and interrogates him on Jenny's whereabouts by dangling him over a cliff face. Sully tells Matrix that Cooke understands Jenny's whereabouts and Matrix drops him off the cliff to his death. After taking a motel key from Sully's pocket, Matrix goes to the motel where Cooke, a former Green Beret in Arius's employ, is staying. The two fight until Matrix impales Cooke on a table leg. He then attempts to interrogate Cooke on Jenny's whereabouts but Cooke dies before he can answer.

With evidence discovered in Cooke's car, Matrix and Cindy break into a nearby warehouse owned by Arius that supplies weapons for his army. They learn where Jenny is being held after tracing Arius's island (San Nicolas Island) base using a coastal region map. Matrix breaks into a surplus store to equip himself with military weaponry, but is arrested by the police. Cindy helps him escape, and after commandeering a seaplane from a nearby Arius-controlled marina, Matrix and Cindy land the plane off the coast of Arius' island hideout.

Matrix instructs Cindy to contact General Kirby and then proceeds to Arius's villa, killing Arius and his army. Jenny escapes to the villa's basement but is eventually recaptured by Bennett. Matrix tracks them down, and after a lengthy showdown, Matrix finally kills Bennett by impaling him with a steam pipe. Kirby arrives with a military detachment and asks Matrix to rejoin the unit, but Matrix declines and departs the island aboard the seaplane with Jenny and Cindy.

== Cast ==
- Arnold Schwarzenegger as Colonel John Matrix
- Rae Dawn Chong as Cindy
- Alyssa Milano as Jenny Matrix
- Dan Hedaya as General Arius
- Vernon Wells as Captain Bennett
- James Olson as Major General Franklin Kirby
- David Patrick Kelly as Sully
- Bill Duke as Cooke
- Drew Snyder as Lawson
- Michael Delano as Forrestal
- Charles Meshack as Henriques
- Carlos Cervantes as Diaz
- Chelsea Field as Brunette Stewardess
- Bill Paxton as Intercept Officer
- Ava Cadell as Girl in Bed at Motel
- Branscombe Richmond as Vega

== Production ==
=== Development ===
Writer Jeph Loeb said his original script was about an Israeli soldier who had renounced violence. The lead role was originally written for Gene Simmons, but Simmons turned it down. Steven E. de Souza rewrote the script, tailoring it to Schwarzenegger.

=== Casting ===
Vernon Wells was the first choice to be cast as Captain Bennett, mostly because of his role in Mad Max 2 (1981). Mark L. Lester stated that Wells was "the only one that could have played against him [Schwarzenegger]". He further added Bennett was "in love with Matrix but he hated him, too. He wanted to kill him but he was in love with him."

=== Filming ===
Principal photography began on April 22, 1985, and wrapped on June 6, 1985, after 45 days of filming. The film was shot on location in California. San Nicolas Island off the coast of Santa Barbara, to which Matrix flies to rescue his daughter, was filmed on the Pacific coast at San Simeon. The barracks that are "attacked" are beach properties belonging to the Hearst Castle estate. The log cabin scenes, where Jenny is abducted, were filmed at Mt. Baldy.

The house that Matrix storms at the film's climax was the former main residence of the Harold Lloyd Estate in the Benedict Canyon district of Beverly Hills. The car chase scene between Sully and Matrix starts on Ventura Boulevard and moves into the hills on Benedict Canyon. The Sherman Oaks Galleria, in Sherman Oaks, California, served as the film's shopping mall location, and was used for six days after 9 p.m., when stores were closed. The film was originally set to cost $8 million, but it went over budget and cost $10 million once filming ended.

== Music ==
=== Soundtrack ===
Commando

Soundtrack album by James Horner
- Released: December 2003
- Genre: Soundtrack
- Length: 43:21
- Label: Varèse Sarabande

Professional ratings
Review scores
Source	Rating
AllMusic	link

A soundtrack album was released by Varèse Sarabande on December 2, 2003, as part of the label's CD Club and was limited to 3,000 copies. The score, composed by James Horner, is notable for its prominent use of steel drums and for reusing motifs from Horner's soundtrack for 48 Hrs. (which would be again recycled to varying degrees in Red Heat and Another 48 Hrs.).

Track listing

1. "Prologue/Main Title" – 3:58
2. "Ambush and Kidnapping" – 2:35
3. "Captured" – 2:14
4. "Surprise" – 8:19
5. "Sully Runs" – 4:34
6. "Moving Jenny" – 3:44
7. "Matrix Breaks In" – 3:30
8. "Infiltration, Showdown and Finale" – 14:32

Commando

Soundtrack album by James Horner
- Released: August 2011
- Genre: Soundtrack
- Length: 61:48
- Label: La-La Land Records

La-La Land Records released a limited edition of James Horner's score in August 2011. The release features approximately 62 minutes of music across 24 tracks and includes "We Fight for Love" by The Power Station.

== Release ==
=== Home media ===
In May 1999, the first DVD of Commando was released in region 1 in the United States. Common with early DVD releases, the disc featured a non-anamorphic video transfer, a basic 2.0 surround track, and only the US theatrical trailer as an extra. DVDs released in other regions soon followed, some with anamorphic transfers.

The 2001 United Kingdom region 2 DVD was censored by the British Board of Film Classification (BBFC), with 12 seconds of cuts to an arm severing and closeups of the impaled Bennett. These cuts were brought over from the 1985 original theatrical release. A German master was used for the UK DVD, meaning the film was cut even more than it should have been, leading to 56 seconds of cuts instead of the BBFC's 12 seconds. If the film had been resubmitted to the BBFC, it would be passed uncut under the BBFC's new, more liberal rules. This has proven to be the case as the BBFC's website indicates that both versions of the film, the U.S. theatrical cut and the unrated edition, for the DVD were passed in June 2007. With the unrated edition released, the film is available in its entirety, a first for the UK.

In September 2007, a completely unedited and unrated director's cut of the film was released on region 1 DVD. Through seamless branching, this disc features an unrated cut (which was claimed to run at 95 minutes, but is only 91 minutes, with 92 seconds of extra footage), and also contains the original 90-minute, R-rated US theatrical version. Aside from this, the DVD is a special edition, featuring an audio commentary from director Mark L. Lester (only on the theatrical cut), additional deleted scenes, a Pure Action featurette, a Let Off Some Steam featurette, and four photo galleries with over 150 photos. The transfer is anamorphically enhanced and features a 5.1 audio mix.

In April 2008, the 90-minute theatrical version of the film was released to consumers on the high definition Blu-ray Disc format.

In May 2015, as part of the film's 30th anniversary, the director's cut of Commando was released on Blu-ray Disc, in a limited edition, collectible metalpak as a Best Buy exclusive. It contains all of the special features that were included in the 2007 DVD release, including the 90-minute theatrical version of the film.

== Reception ==
=== Box office ===
Commando was a box office success, grossing over $57.5 million against a $9 million budget. The film debuted at number one on the weekend of October 4–6, 1985 in the United States and spent three consecutive weeks at the top position

=== Critical response ===
Review aggregation website Rotten Tomatoes gives the film a rating of 70% based on reviews from 40 critics, with an average rating of 6/10. The website's critical consensus reads, "The ultimate '80s Schwarzenegger movie, replete with a threadbare plot, outsized action, and endless one-liners." On Metacritic, the film has a rating of 51 out of 100, based on 7 critics, indicating "mixed or average" reviews.

D. J. R. Bruckner of The New York Times wrote that "two-thirds of this 90-minute film is mayhem unrelieved by humor and untouched by humanity," and suggested that if sequels were to be made, "more clever writers and subtler directors will have to be found. Even a cinematic comic book needs more artful care than this one was given." Variety wrote, "While it's not in the class of Schwarzenegger's last hit (The Terminator), Commando is actually superior to Rambo: First Blood Part II because of its deft mixture of humor and action (with most of the action brushed with humor) and its deliberate evasion of any political message."

Patrick Goldstein of the Los Angeles Times wrote, "Full of spectacular stunts and shootouts, it's a gory crowd-pleaser, directed with jolting efficiency by low-budget veteran Mark L. Lester. If his scenarists had only given Lester a finale with as much explosive punch as his opening scenes, the film could have been a real treat instead of a glorified fireworks display."

Gene Siskel of the Chicago Tribune gave the film 2 stars out of 4 and wrote that "Schwarzenegger plays his action scenes both with vengeance and a comic-book laugh, but the mix never gels," adding, "The concluding battle scenes are wimpy by comparison with the action in Rambo. All we see is a half-dozen barracks blown up, shot from four different angles. Wow, look at all of the splintered wood." Paul Attanasio of The Washington Post wrote that the film "starts out fun and ends up dreary—how long can you watch this stony Austrian take target practice?"

=== Interviews ===
In 1985, Schwarzenegger was interviewed by Gene Siskel about his role in Commando. During the interview, Siskel played a clip from the movie showing Matrix chasing Sully through the mall. In one of the scenes, Matrix picked up an entire telephone booth with Sully in it and flipped it over. Siskel asked how much the telephone booth weighed to which Schwarzenegger responded, "270 pounds (120 kg)" and answered that the stuntman in the booth weighed "130 pounds (59 kg)". When asked if he could lift 400 pounds (180 kg), Schwarzenegger responded, "Yeah sure, I mean God I've been lifting my whole life so it's no problem".

=== Legacy ===
Commando inspired many other action films, including Strike Commando (1987), Commando Squad (1987), and When Eagles Strike (2003).

Lester said: "There's a new book that came out about the child African fighters and how they get weapons. And there's a section in there about how they show kids the end of Commando to get them enthusiastic. I thought 'Wow – that's disturbing.' I guess we don't realize the effect our movies have on people."

== Sequel plans ==
A sequel was planned for 1987 and a script that included Schwarzenegger, Chong, and Milano was written, but Schwarzenegger declined. Original scriptwriter de Souza has debunked a rumor this script, when the project did not go ahead, morphed into the Die Hard script.

In 2010, Fox announced a remake with David Ayer at the helm, but nothing came out of it.

== See also ==
- List of American films of 1985
- Arnold Schwarzenegger filmography
