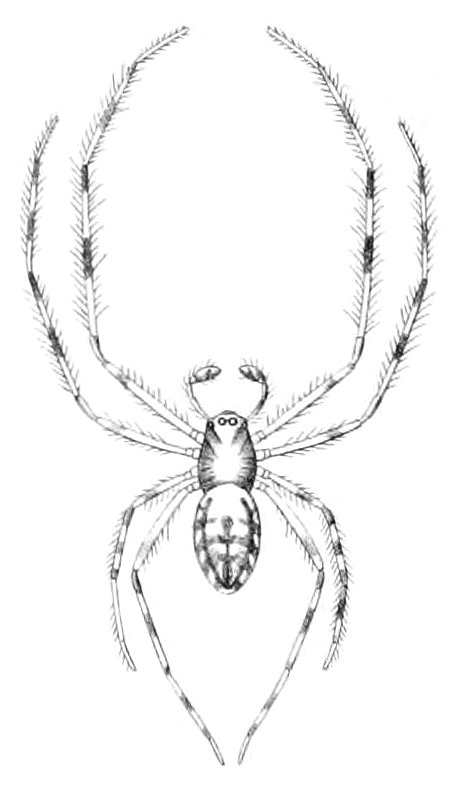
- Orsonwelles graphicus

Scientific classification
- Kingdom: Animalia
- Phylum: Arthropoda
- Subphylum: Chelicerata
- Class: Arachnida
- Order: Araneae
- Infraorder: Araneomorphae
- Family: Linyphiidae
- Genus: Orsonwelles; Hormiga, 2002

Type species
- O. polites Hormiga, 2002

Species
- 13, see text
- Range of Orsonwelles in the Hawaiian Islands

= Orsonwelles =

Genus of spiders

Orsonwelles is a genus of American dwarf spiders that was first described by G. Hormiga in 2002. They are all native to the Hawaiian Islands, each species occurring on a single island, often at high elevations. One species has not been collected since the 1890s, and is believed to be extinct. The name honors the actor and film-maker Orson Welles. Many of the species names commemorate elements from Welles' films, radio productions, or roles.

The first species were described in 1900 by the French naturalist Eugène Simon, who described Orsonwelles malus (as Labulla torosa) and Orsonwelles graphicus (as Labulla graphica). In 2002, Gustavo Hormiga described eleven new species, establishing the new genus Orsonwelles. The Labulla species became torosus and graphicus because Orsonwelles is a masculine noun.

== Description ==
The carapace and abdomen are dark brown to gray. A light band runs down the middle of the carapace. The abdomen is oval-shaped, and sometimes has light blotches or chevron-shaped markings on the dorsal surface. The second limb segments on the third and fourth leg pairs have one to six trichobothria, a trait unique among the Linyphiidae. Their chelicerae are massive and have many cheliceral teeth.

They are nocturnal, remaining hidden during the day and appearing upside down in the center of their webs at night. Large chelicerae with teeth allow them to be generalist predators, feeding on a variety of arthropods, including moths and terrestrial amphipods. Several species of Argyrodes, a genus of smaller spiders and occasional kleptoparasites of Orsonwelles, have been found caught in their webs.

They primarily live in remnants of rainforests and mixed mesic forests. Many are restricted to higher elevations, where environmental disturbance is less severe and non-native species less common, but some species occur in disturbed areas as low as 500 m (1,600 ft) above sea level.

In part, due to island gigantism, a phenomenon causing lineages on islands to evolve larger than their mainland relatives, Orsonwelles contains the largest known members of the family Linyphiidae. Females reach body lengths of 8.06 to 14.07 millimetres (0.317 to 0.554 in), and males reach 6.2 to 11.35 millimetres (0.244 to 0.447 in). The largest individuals recorded are in the species O. malus. The next largest is Laminacauda gigas, attaining body lengths of just under 10 millimetres (0.39 in).

== Species ==
Each species is endemic to a single island, with six species on Kauai, three on Oahu, two on Molokai, and one each on Maui and the Island of Hawaii. The species O. torosus of Kauai is believed to be extinct, as it was last collected in the 1890s and has not been collected since.

As of May 2019 it contains thirteen species:

- Orsonwelles ambersonorum Hormiga, 2002 – Oahu (Named for Welles' 1942 film The Magnificent Ambersons)
- Orsonwelles arcanus Hormiga, 2002 – Oahu (Named for Welles' 1955 film Mr. Arkadin (also known as Confidential Report; arcanus meaning "hidden" or "confidential" in Latin))
- Orsonwelles bellum Hormiga, 2002 – Kauai (Named for Welles' 1938 radio drama The War of the Worlds (bellum meaning "war" in Latin))
- Orsonwelles calx Hormiga, 2002 – Kauai (Named for Harry Lime, Welles' character in Carol Reed's 1949 film The Third Man (calx meaning "lime" in Latin))
- Orsonwelles falstaffius Hormiga, 2002 – Maui (Named for the character Falstaff, played by Welles in his 1966 film Chimes at Midnight)
- Orsonwelles graphicus (Simon, 1900) – Hawaii (Graphicus, Latin: "belonging to painting or drawing")
- Orsonwelles iudicium Hormiga, 2002 – Kauai (Named for Welles' 1962 film The Trial (iudicium meaning "judgement" or "trial" in Latin))
- Orsonwelles macbeth Hormiga, 2002 – Molokai (Named for Welles' 1948 film Macbeth)
- Orsonwelles malus Hormiga, 2002 – Kauai (Named for Welles' 1958 film Touch of Evil (malus meaning "evil" in Latin))
- Orsonwelles othello Hormiga, 2002 – Molokai (Named for Welles' 1952 film Othello)
- Orsonwelles polites Hormiga, 2002 (type) – Oahu (Named for Welles' 1941 film Citizen Kane (polites meaning "citizen" in Greek))
- Orsonwelles torosus (Simon, 1900) – Kauai (Torosus, Latin for "muscular" or "fleshy")
- Orsonwelles ventus Hormiga, 2002 – Kauai (Named for Welles' unfinished film The Other Side of the Wind (ventus meaning wind in Latin))

== See also ==
- Endemism in the Hawaiian Islands
- List of organisms named after famous people (born 1900–1924)
- Predatoroonops, a genus of spiders with species named after characters from the 1987 film Predator
