= Upstate =

The term upstate may refer to the northerly portions of several U.S. states. On the east coast, upstate generally refers to places away from the Atlantic Ocean. It also can refer to parts of states that have a higher elevation, away from sea level. These regions tend to be rural; exceptions include Delaware and Illinois.

Places

- Maine, except for "Down East"
- Upstate California, a 2001 marketing campaign to promote the northern half of Northern California
- Upstate New York, much of New York north of the New York City metropolitan area
- Upstate South Carolina, the northwestern "corner" of South Carolina
- Upstate Pennsylvania, a tourism region that includes much of Northeastern Pennsylvania

Other

- SUNY Upstate Medical University, often referred to as "Upstate"
  - Upstate University Hospital, Syracuse, New York
- A term used to refer to going to the penitentiary in New York, as all of New York's state prisons are upstate.

== See also ==
- Articles beginning with "Upstate"
- Downstate (disambiguation)
- Up North (disambiguation)
- Down south (disambiguation)
