= Downstate =

Downstate may refer to:

- Downstate Illinois, the portion of the U.S. state of Illinois south of the Chicago metropolitan area
  - Downstate (play), a 2018 tragicomedy about sex offenders set in Downstate Illinois
- Downstate New York, the southeastern portion of the U.S. state of New York, including New York City
  - SUNY Downstate Medical Center, sometimes referred to as "Downstate"

== See also ==
- Upstate (disambiguation)
- Down south (disambiguation)
