= List of Symphogear episodes =

Symphogear or Senki Zesshō Symphogear is a 2012 anime television series produced by Satelight with production assistance from Encourage Films during the first season. In the near future, musical warriors wielding armor known as Symphogear fight against an alien race known as the Noise. Hibiki Tachibana, a girl who was rescued from the Noise two years ago by a Symphogear user named Kanade, who died in the ensuing battle, ends up inheriting her power to fight against the Noise.The first season aired in Japan on Tokyo MX between January 6, 2012, and March 30, 2012, and was licensed in North America and simulcast on Niconico by Funimation Entertainment. The opening theme is "Synchrogazer" by Nana Mizuki whilst the ending theme for the first 12 episodes is "Meteor Light" by Ayahi Takagaki, and for episode 13, "Gyakkou no Flügel" by Nana Mizuki & Minami Takayama.

A second season, Senki Zesshō Symphogear G, aired in Japan between July 4, 2013, and September 26, 2013. The opening theme is "Vitalization" by Mizuki whilst the ending theme is "Next Destination" by Takagaki. Bonus OVA episodes were included with the fifth and sixth BD/DVD volumes.

A third season, Senki Zesshō Symphogear GX, aired between July 4, 2015, and September 25, 2015, and was simulcast by Crunchyroll. The opening theme is "Exterminate" by Mizuki while the ending theme is "Rebirth-day" by Takagaki.

A fourth and fifth season were announced at Symphogear Live 2016. The fourth season, Senki Zesshō Symphogear AXZ, aired between July 1, 2017, and September 30, 2017. The opening theme is "TESTAMENT" by Mizuki while the ending theme is "Futurism" by Takagaki.

The fifth and final season, Senki Zesshō Symphogear XV, aired between July 6, 2019, and September 28, 2019. The opening theme (episodes 2–11; ending for episode 12) is "METANOIA" by Mizuki, while the ending theme (episodes 2–11; opening for episode 12) is "Lasting Song" by Takagaki. The season was initially scheduled to start airing in April.

The OVAs, Senki Zesshou Shinai Symphogear, started to be included with G's BDs. The G OVAs are included in the two last BD volumes of the series, while from GX onwards the OVAs are included in the last 4 BD volumes. The first two OVAs have no ending theme, while in the GX and AXZ's ones the ending theme is "Itsuka no Niji, Hana no Omoide" by Aoi Yuuki and Yuka Iguchi, except the last AXZ's OVA, which ending theme is "Todoke Happy Uta Zukin!" by Takagaki.

From G to AXZ, the ending theme for every season finale is "Nijiiro no Flügel", performed by Aoi Yuuki, Nana Mizuki, Ayahi Takagaki, Yoko Hikasa, Yoshino Nanjo, Ai Kayano & Minami Takayama; and for the series finale, the ending theme is "Ashita e no Flügel", performed by Aoi Yuuki, Nana Mizuki, Ayahi Takagaki, Yoko Hikasa, Yoshino Nanjo, Ai Kayano & Yuka Iguchi.

== Series overview ==
Season	Episodes	Originally released	
Season	Episodes	First released	Last released
1	13	January 6, 2012	March 30, 2012
2	13	July 4, 2013	September 26, 2013
3	13	July 4, 2015	September 26, 2015
4	13	July 1, 2017	September 30, 2017
5	13	July 6, 2019	September 28, 2019

== Episode list ==
=== Symphogear (2012) ===
No. overall	No. in season	Title	Directed by (Note: Production staff information is taken from the ending credits of each episode)	Storyboarded by	Original release date
1	1	"Awakening Heartbeat"; Transliteration: "Kakusei no Kodō" (Japanese: 覚醒の鼓動)	Yasushi Moroya	Tatsufumi Itou	January 6, 2012
A girl named Hibiki Tachibana attends a concert held by Tsubasa Kazanari and Kanade Amō, who form the pop duo, Zwei Wing. In the middle of the concert, the stadium is attacked by an alien race known as Noise who begin killing the attendees. Tsubasa and Kanade summon mechanical battle armor known as Symphogear to fight off the Noise, but soon find themselves in a pinch. As Kanade tries to protect Hibiki, a stray fragment of her armor comes off and hits Hibiki. With her suit losing power, Kanade sings the superb song, a powerful song that destroys all the Noise at the cost of her own life, leaving Tsubasa devastated. Two years later, Hibiki, who was able to survive, is attending Lydian Music Academy alongside her friend, Miku Kohinata, while Tsubasa, who goes to the same school, continues to fight the Noise alone. As Hibiki goes into town to buy a new CD, she comes across a Noise attack and tries to help a young girl get to safety. When they become cornered, she sings the song she heard Kanade sing that day, which ends up giving her Kanade's Gungnir Symphogear.
2	2	"Noise and Disharmony"; Transliteration: "Zatsuon to Fukyōwaon to" (Japanese: 雑音と不協和音と)	Tomoaki Koshida	Kenji Yasuda	January 13, 2012
Hibiki uses her newfound ability to protect the girl from the Noise before Tsubasa arrives on the scene to defeat them. Afterwards, Hibiki is taken to the underground headquarters for the Mobile Disaster Response Corps Section Two to run a medical checkup. They soon reveal Hibiki's ability to summon Symphogear comes from fragments of a relic Kanade possessed that entered Hibiki's body during the battle two years ago. As Tsubasa is shocked by the news, Hibiki agrees to fight against the Noise. A large Noise monster appears in the city which Tsubasa defeats, before telling Hibiki that she wants to fight her.
3	3	"Passing in the Night"; Transliteration: "Yoru ni Surechigau" (Japanese: 夜にすれ違う)	Toruu Yoshida	Masami Shimoda	January 20, 2012
Tsubasa attempts to attack Hibiki, refusing to accept her as Kanade's replacement, but the fight is halted by Section Two's commander, Genjuro Kazanari. One month later and the two have still been unable to get along with each other. As the Section Two discuss the recent outbreaks of Noise, they theorize the Noise are targeting a collection of relics known as Durandal hidden beneath Lydian Academy. As Hibiki makes plans to watch shooting stars with Miku, she is called away to another Noise outbreak, forcing her to cancel to both girls' ire. After Hibiki and Tsubasa defeat the Noise, they are confronted by a new enemy wearing the Nehushtan Armor that was stolen two years ago.
4	4	"Falling Tears"; Transliteration: "Rakurui" (Japanese: 落涙)	Katsumi Ono	Tatsufumi Itou	January 27, 2012
Five years ago, Kanade was brought to Section Two after her family was killed by the Noise. Wanting to get revenge on the Noise, she underwent harsh medical treatment to become compatible with the Gungnir relic and gain Symphogear. As she began fighting alongside Tsubasa, she grew an appreciation for sharing her music with others and formed Zwei Wing with her. Back in the present, Tsubasa faces off against the girl in the Nehushtan Armor who reveals her goal is to capture Hibiki. As her opponent starts to overwhelm her, Tsubasa sings her superb song, which forces the armored girl to flee, whilst Tsubasa barely survives the damage done to her body. As Tsubasa slowly recovers, Hibiki hears about how she was affected following Kanade's death two years ago and becomes depressed, feeling everything has been her fault. After some encouraging words from Miku, Hibiki resolves to be herself and become stronger to protect others and begins training with Genjuro.
5	5	"From the Bottom of Darker Depths"; Transliteration: "Nao Kuraki Shinen no Soko Kara" (Japanese: なお昏き深淵の底から)	Kazunobu Shimizu	Tatsufumi Itou	February 3, 2012
As Chris, the wielder of the Nehushtan Armor, is punished for the failure of her mission by her mysterious mistress, Tsubasa regains consciousness after speaking with Kanade in her dream about how she should live. Meanwhile, the Minister of Defense is assassinated by terrorists, targeting a case that Ryoko manages to recover. Ryoko explains the case contains a chip pertaining to the Durandal sword hidden beneath the base. Hibiki accompanies Ryoko on a mission to escort Durandal to a safe location, but they are soon confronted by Chris and a group of Noise which Hibiki fights off. The Durandal responds to Hibiki's voice and activates, and despite Chris' attempt to grab it, Hibiki grabs it instead, giving her a brief moment of incredible power which drives off Chris.
6	6	"Where Omens Lead"; Transliteration: "Kizashi no Yukue wa" (Japanese: 兆しの行方は)	Yasushi Moroya	Kenji Yasuda	February 10, 2012
As Chris vows to her mistress, revealed to be named Finé, that she will take Hibiki down with her own power, Hibiki is asked to help look after Tsubasa whilst she recovers. As Tsubasa asks to hear from Hibiki about what she fights for, Miku spots the two together and becomes determined to talk with Hibiki. When Miku ends up getting caught in the battlefield when Chris appears, Hibiki is forced to reveal her secret to save her. Luring her away, Hibiki attempts to reason with Chris, but she is unwilling to listen. Being unable to construct an Armed Gear like Tsubasa, Hibiki instead uses the required energy to power her punch and break through Chris' armor.
7	7	"Fate Just Keeps Firing"; Transliteration: "Uchiteshi Yamanu Unmei no Motoni" (Japanese: 撃ちてし止まぬ運命のもとに)	Daisuke Tsukushi	Masami Shimoda	February 17, 2012
As Hibiki tries to reach Chris' feelings, Chris activates her own relic, Ichaival, and attacks using her own Symphogear. Just as Tsubasa arrives on the scene to back Hibiki up, Finé arrives and breaks up the fight, taking the Nehushtan Armor and telling Chris that she no longer has use for her. Later that night, Chris comes across a pair of siblings and helps reunite them with their father. Meanwhile, Miku is mad at Hibiki for lying to her, telling her they can no longer be friends. As Chris tries to confront Finé over abandoning her, Finé dons the Nehushtan Armor and attacks her.
8	8	"No Shadows in the Sunlight"; Transliteration: "Hidamari ni Kageri Naku" (Japanese: 陽だまりに翳りなく)	Kiyoshi Egami	Kenji Yasuda	February 24, 2012
Whilst having a walk, Miku encounters Chris, who had become exhausted from being chased by the Noise, and decides to help nurse her back to health. As Chris explains her troubled childhood to Miku, a Noise alert appears, with Chris blaming herself for bringing them there. When Chris has trouble transforming, Genjuro appears to defend her whilst she transforms and leads the Noise away. Meanwhile, Hibiki encounters Miku and an okonomiya shop owner as they are trapped by an octopus-like Noise who detects noises. After apologizing to Hibiki, Miku decides to lead the Noise away to give Hibiki a chance to transform, arriving just in time to defeat the Noise and save Miku. After Miku confesses the reason she was angry was because she was fearful for Hibiki's safety, the two make up with each other.
9	9	"Protector's Song"; Transliteration: "Sakimori no Uta" (Japanese: 防人の歌)	Katsumi Ono	Naotaka Hayashi	March 2, 2012
After Miku joins the second division, Genjuro goes to see Chris, explaining how he was to become her guardian after she was rescued from trafficking two years ago, but she refuses his help. Having fully recovered from her injuries, Tsubasa is invited by Hibiki and Miku to spend the day together, where she comes to understand some of Kanade's words. Tsubasa decides to participate in a music festival taking place at the arena where that fateful incident took place. On the night of the concert, Hibiki decides to take on a Noise case on her own, where she teams up with Chris. Following the concert, Tsubasa decides to take on an overseas contract.
10	10	"What Only Clasped Hands Can Create"; Transliteration: "Tsunaida Te Dake ga Tsumugu Mono" (Japanese: 繋いだ手だけが紡ぐもの)	Kenji Yasuda	Masami Shimoda	March 9, 2012
Ryoko is attacked by some American terrorists while working in Finé's mansion, but she fuses with the Nehushtan Armor in a desperate move and kills them. As Chris and Genjuro come across the scene, Genjuro helps Chris understand what her parents fought for. As the Second Division investigate a clue given to them by Chris, Kadingir, a group of large airborne Noise appears over Tokyo Sky Tower, with Chris arriving to assist Hibiki and Tsubasa. Despite some hostility from Chris, Hibiki helps her and Tsubasa get along and together they defeat the Noise. Afterwards, however, Hibiki receives a distressing call from Miku that the academy is under attack by the Noise.
11	11	"Shoot the Moon"; Transliteration: "Tsuki o Ugatsu" (Japanese: 月を穿つ)	Yoshihiro Mori	Kenji Yasuda	March 16, 2012
As Ogawa tries to get Miku to safety to the Section Two headquarters, they are attacked by Finé, who is revealed to be Ryoko as Genjuro arrives on the scene to fight against her. However, Finé manages to critically wound Genjuro and goes on to take the Durandal. As Finé goes on to confront Hibiki, Tsubasa and Chris as they arrive on the scene, she explains how she is an ancient priestess who possessed Ryoko's body twelve years ago thanks to Tsubasa's accidental awakening of the Ame no Habakiri. Finé then proceeds to bring out the Kadingir, a huge cannon that she had been building in the Section Two's elevator shaft all this time, which she plans to use to destroy the moon to remove the Curse of Balal that had caused humanity to lose the one only language it could converse with God and each other, and at the same time create worldwide chaos due to the gravity collapse brought by its destruction, which she hopes to force humanity to bow to her in their fear. As the cannon prepares to fire, Chris sings her superb song and sacrifices herself to stop the beam from completely destroying the moon, to the shock of Hibiki.
12	12	"Symphogear"; Transliteration: "Shinfogia" (Japanese: シンフォギア)	Kazunobu Shimizu	Fumitoshi Oizaki	March 23, 2012
Shocked by Chris' supposed death, Hibiki goes berserk and loses control, attacking relentlessly at both Finé and Tsubasa. As Kadingir prepare to fire another shot at the moon, Tsubasa takes the full brunt of Hibiki's attack in order to hold her in place before standing to face against Finé in order to try and launching a kamikaze attack which destroys Kadingir. As Finé turns her anger on Hibiki, who is not sure what to fight for anymore, the girl Hibiki had previously saved gives Miku the idea to, with the help of her friends, send Hibiki everyone's words of support. Upon hearing her classmates sing her school's anthem, Hibiki, along with Tsubasa and Chris who had survived, unleash the Symphogear's true potential.
13	13	"Meteoroids Falling, Burning, Disappearing, and then..." Transliteration: "Nagareboshi, Ochite Koete Kotogotokite, Soshite—" (Japanese: 流れ星、堕ちて燃えて尽きて、そして—)	Tatsufumi Itou	Tatsufumi Itou	March 30, 2012
As Finé summons an entire army of Noise, Hibiki, Tsubasa and Chris work together to fight them off. Just then, Finé fuses herself with Durandal and the remaining Noise to become the Red Dragon of Revelations. Working together, Tsubasa and Chris manage to retrieve Durandal from Finé and pass it on to Hibiki who manages to control its power thanks to Miku and the others and defeats Finé. Unwilling to listen to Hibiki's words, Finé uses the last of her strength to pull the loose fragment of the moon towards the earth. However, Hibiki asks Finé to, when she reincarnates, pass on the message that people will one day understand each other. Finé, moved by Hibiki's kindness, tells her to believe in the song of her heart, before fading away into dust. As Hibiki goes alone to stop the fragment using her superb song, Tsubasa and Chris join her and together they sing the ultimate superb song to destroy the fragment. Some time later, as Miku finds herself cornered by Noise, Hibiki, Tsubasa and Chris return safe and sound.

=== Symphogear G (2013) ===
No. overall	No. in season	Title	Directed by	Storyboarded by	Original release date
14	1	"The Gungnir Girl"; Transliteration: "Gangunīru no Shōjo" (Japanese: ガングニールの少女)	Ayumu Suzuki	Katsumi Ono	July 4, 2013
Three months following the battle with Finé, Hibiki and Chris work together to fight off the Noise and protect a transport carrying the Solomon's Cane, which scientist Dr. Ver believes could hold the key to fighting the Noise. However, before they can leave to see Tsubasa's concert alongside diva Maria Cadenzavna Eve, the base they are delivering it to is attacked by the Noise, with Dr. Ver and Solomon's Cane going missing. As the concert reaches its climax, Maria suddenly summons a group of Noise, holding the audience hostage and using the worldwide broadcast to prevent Tsubasa from using her Symphogear. Maria then reveals she possesses a black Gungnir Symphogear armor, proclaiming herself and her group to be the successors of Finé.
15	2	"Power and Lies in Her Heart"; Transliteration: "Mune ni Chikara to Itsuwari to" (Japanese: 胸に力と偽りと)	Yoshihide Yuuzumi	Katsumi Ono	July 11, 2013
After giving the world leaders 24 hours to relinquish their territory, Maria decides to release the hostages in the arena so she can fight against Tsubasa, preventing her from escaping to where she can safely transform. Just as Tsubasa is knocked towards a group of Noise, Ogawa manages to shut down the cameras in time, allowing Tsubasa to activate her Symphogear and fight back. Before Tsubasa can get the upper hand on Maria, two more enemy Symphogear users, Shirabe Tsukuyomi and Kirika Akatsuki, arrive on the scene, although Hibiki and Chris arrive shortly after to back Tsubasa up. The head of Maria's operations, Professor Nastassja, sends in a giant regenerating Noise to allows Maria's team to retreat. To prevent in from escaping and endangering the public, Hibiki, Tsubasa and Chris use a combined superb song to expose its core, allowing Hibiki to destroy it. As the battle comes to an end, Hibiki feels hurt by Shirabe's words claiming she her ideals are merely the words of a hypocrite, bringing up some traumatic memories of her past.
16	3	"Those Who Long for the End, Those Who Challenge the End"; Transliteration: "Shūen o Nozomumono, Shūen ni Nozomumono" (Japanese: 終焉を望む者、終焉に臨む者)	Naomichi Yamato	Kurio Miyaura	July 18, 2013
A week following the incident, and Hibiki is still concerned over what Shirabe said whilst Tsubasa and Chris, who had enrolled into the academy, help with preparations for an upcoming school festival. Later that night, Hibiki, Tsubasa and Chris are sent to infiltrate an abandoned hospital filled with Noise, affected by a gas that decreases their sync with the Symphogears. Dr. Ver soon appears, revealing he stole Solomon's Cane for himself and is working with the enemy. As Chris starts to become affected by the feedback on her Symphogear's attacks, Ver plans to unleash an experimental new creature known as a Nephilim onto the city, forcing Tsubasa to chase after it. Before Tsubasa can destroy the Nephilim, Maria appears before her once again, with Ver announcing her to be the reincarnation of Finé.
17	4	"The Place I Call Home"; Transliteration: "Atashi no Kaeru Basho" (Japanese: あたしの帰る場所)	Hidetoshi Takahashi	Atsushi Wakabayashi	July 25, 2013
Tsubasa engages in battle with Maria whilst Shirabe and Kirika arrive to fight off Hibiki and Chris whilst they retrieve Ver. Nastassja soon arrives and assists Maria and the others in their retreat, taking Ver and the Nephilim with them and evading pursuit using stealth technology. The next day, as the festival gets under the way and Hibiki and Miku watch their friends perform, Shirabe and Kirika are sent on a mission to infiltrate the school and steal the Symphogear pendants to use as food for the Nephilim. Meanwhile, Chris is dragged in by her new classmates to perform for a karaoke contest, where she finds herself having fun. After her performance, however, Shirabe and Kirika reveal themselves and prepare to challenge her.
18	5	"Bloodstained Serenade"; Transliteration: "Chishibuki no Sayokyoku" (Japanese: 血飛沫の小夜曲)	Kazuhide Kondo	Kouji Yoshikawa	August 1, 2013
Shirabe and Kirika decide to enter the karaoke contest themselves, singing one of ZweiWing's songs so that they can win Chris' pendant. Meanwhile, armed forces approach a warehouse where Maria and Nastassja are hiding, but are confronted by Ver and his Noise army. Maria breaks down when she sees Ver mercilessly kill a group of children who happened to stumble upon the base, prompting Nastassja to have Shirabe and Kirika retreat before they can be declared winners. Hibiki, Tsubasa and Chris briefly catch up to them, questioning why they fight when they seem to enjoy singing, to which they say they will settle things in a duel. they are called to HQ where it is revealed Hibiki and Maria's Gungnirs share the same resonance pattern. Meanwhile, Nastassja recalls how Maria's sister, Serena, had used her superb song to stop a rampaging Nephilim prototype, ending her life in the process. Later that day, the girls head to the former site of Kadingir for their arranged duel, only to find Ver, who states that the moon will fall towards Earth once more before sending the Nephilim to attack them. Hibiki fights against the Nephilim but becomes distracted by Ver's words, leading to her arm being bitten off by the Nephilim.
19	6	"A Miracle is a Cruel Thing"; Transliteration: "Kiseki – Sore wa Zankoku na Kiseki" (Japanese: 奇跡ーーそれは残酷な軌跡)	Kazunobu Shimizu	Osamu Tadokoro	August 8, 2013
The Nephilim evolves from the energy gathered from Hibiki's arm, but Hibiki enters her berserk state again, regenerating her arm in the process, and rips out the Nephilim's heart before completely annihilating it. As Hibiki undergoes recovery, she recalls how she was unfairly treated like a murderer by her old classmates due to being the only survivor of the ZweiWing incident. Meanwhile, Tsubasa learns from Genjuro that Hibiki's constant use of Gungnir is causing it to spread across her body, fearing that it may end up killing her, or otherwise leaving her inhuman. Keeping this a secret from Hibiki, Tsubasa tells her that she should not use her Symphogear again, using the berserk state as an excuse. Elsewhere, as Nastassja's illness starts to develop, Shirabe and Kirika search for Ver, who finds the Nephilim's heart and attacks near the school, prompting Hibiki to go into action.
20	7	"When You Stop Being You"; Transliteration: "Kimi de Irare Nakunaru Kimi ni" (Japanese: 君でいられなくなるキミに)	Yuki Arie	Kurio Miyaura	August 15, 2013
Brimming with more power than usual, Hibiki fights through Ver's defenses, only to be stopped by Shirabe and Kirika. As Hibiki suddenly feels a pain in her chest, Ver injects Shirabe and Kirika with an overdose of LiNKER serum so they can use the superb song against Hibiki. In order to stop them from dying the same way Kanade did, Hibiki uses her own superb song to cancel theirs out, firing off their excess energy into the sky. After Shirabe and Kirika retreat with Ver so he can treat Nastassja, wondering why Hibiki was trying to protect them, Tsubasa arrives on the scene to stop Hibiki from overheating. As Ver reveals his plan to use the Nephilim's heart with the Senshou Jing artifact they had retrieved, Genjuro informs Chris and Miku about Hibiki's condition, asking Miku to keep Hibiki from fighting so it spreads no further. Coming to understand Maria's kind heart, Nastassja informs her that she no longer has to play the role of Finé. Elsewhere, Kirika ends up protecting Shirabe from some falling pipes with a strange power.
21	8	"Hand in Hand for Me, As I Waver..."; Transliteration: "Tsunagu Te to Te... Tomadou Watashi no Tame..." (Japanese: 繋ぐ手と手...戸惑うわたしのため...)	Daisuke Chiba	Atsushi Wakabayashi	August 22, 2013
It is revealed that Nastassja has merely told Maria to play the role of Finé's successor in order to gain Ver's co-operation. As Kirika starts to realize the cause of her new power, that she herself is Finé's vessel, Hibiki is informed of her condition and is told to take things easy until they can find a cure. Meanwhile, Nastassja's group use their relics to try and unleash something known as Frontier, only for it to fail to Ver's dismay, as they lack sufficient power. The next day, as Hibiki and Miku go to the Sky Tower, Nastassja and Maria also go there to negotiate with some US government agents, which is interrupted when Ver sends Noise after them just as they turn on them. As Maria makes her escape, fighting through both Noise and army soldiers, Hibiki and Miku work to help evacuate some of the citizens, which leads to Hibiki being knocked off the building. Activating her Symphogear to break her fall, Hibiki is shocked to see an explosion where Miku was standing.
22	9	"The Origin of a Hero"; Transliteration: "Eiyū Koji" (Japanese: 英雄故事)	Shunsuke Ishikawa	Osamu Tadokoro	August 29, 2013
As Tsubasa and Chris arrive to finish off the Noise, Hibiki falls into depression, believing Miku to have been killed. Meanwhile, Maria reveals to the others that she is not Finé, whilst still stating her desire to cooperate with Ver. The next day, Genjuro reveals they have found a GPS left behind by Miku, revealing she had survived the explosion, as she was rescued by Maria and is currently being held on their ship. Thankful that Miku is still alive, Hibiki and the others train their bodies with Genjuro. The next day as the Noise launch an attack on an aircraft carrier, Shirabe, not wanting Maria to suffer from seeing more people die, decides to fight against them. However, Ver instructs Kirika to inject Shirabe with Anti-LiNKER to knock her out of her Symphogear state. However, just as Tsubasa and Chris arrive on the scene, Ver reveals his latest experiment, in which Miku has been made into a Symphogear user.
23	10	"Countdown to Loss"; Transliteration: "Sōshitsu made no Kauntodaun" (Japanese: 喪失までのカウントダウン)	Yasuo Iwamoto	Jin Inai	September 5, 2013
A brainwashed Miku, who was experimented on by Ver with LiNKER to make her compatible with the Shen Shōjing relic, battles against Chris, initially taking the brunt of her attacks before unleashing a powerful laser capable of destroying Symphogear armor, forcing Chris to block against it to protect Shirabe before Tsubasa gets them to safety. As HQ takes Shirabe into custody whilst Chris fights against the Noise, Kirika stands in Tsubasa's way, leading Hibiki to confront Miku herself. Miku states she desired the Symphogear's power to keep Hibiki from fighting, but Hibiki states it is not worth having a world without Miku in it and transforms to fight against her, given under three minutes before she overheats. Despite the Gungnir relic spreading through her body, Hibiki struggles to reach Miku's humanity, using Miku's own laser to destroy her relic. As an ancient civilization rises from the ground, Chris suddenly shoots Tsubasa.
24	11	"Destiny Ark"; Transliteration: "Disutinī Āku" (Japanese: ディスティニーアーク)	Kazuhide Kondo & Shunsuke Ishikawa	Atsushi Wakabayashi	September 12, 2013
As Miku makes a full recovery, it is revealed the blast she and Hibiki took both freed Miku from her mind control and removed Hibiki's relic, curing her condition. Meanwhile, Chris joins the FIS as they explore Frontier, which Ver powers up using the Nephilim heart. Injecting himself with LiNKER, Ver activates the Frontier, using the moon itself to pull it out of the sea, before destroying many fleets with its gravitational power. With the moon brought even closer to Earth, Ver reveals to Maria that his vision of saving mankind is to destroy all humanity and repopulate the Earth himself, leaving Maria devastated. As Tsubasa heads off towards Frontier, Hibiki encourages Shirabe to do what she thinks is right and go as well, hitching a ride with her. Arriving at Frontier, Tsubasa soon faces Chris as Shirabe faces Kirika, whilst Hibiki pushes ahead to find Maria, who is informed by Nastassja that her song may be able to stop the moon from falling.
25	12	"Striking Spear"; Transliteration: "Gakisō" (Japanese: 撃槍)	Yoshihiko Iwata	Kurio Miyaura	September 19, 2013
Hoping to use the power of song to reactivate functions on the moon to bring it back into orbit, Maria broadcasts her song across the world. Meanwhile, Tsubasa, noticing an explosive collar on Chris' neck, realizes that she's been enslaved by Ver and is being forced by him to eliminate Tsubasa in exchange for Solomon's Cane. Tsubusa assures her that she always has a place to belong to and can rely on others, before their battle reaches their climax. Kirika and Shirabe's battle escalates to the point of using their superb songs, where it is discovered that Shirabe was actually the one who possesses Finé's power. Feeling guilty, Kirika attempts to kill herself, but Shirabe takes the hit. Chris, having supposedly defeated Tsubasa, appears before Ver demanding the cane, but he double crosses her; however, he finds himself unable to detonate her collar as it is revealed to have been destroyed by Tsubasa. Having known that he would betray her, she counters his Anti-LiNKER by bursting out of her gear, before she is rescued by Tsubasa (who faked her defeat to trick Ver), recovering the cane in the process. In her conscience, Shirabe is approached by the soul of Finé who, having taken Hibiki's words to heart, gives her own life to save Shirabe so that she and Kirika can help save Maria. Back in the control center, Ver launches the dome where Nastassja is towards the moon, but Hibiki stops Maria from killing Ver, instead taking on the power of Maria's Gungnir relic, reviving her Symphogear.
26	13	"In the Distance, That Day, When the Star Became Music..."; Transliteration: "Haruka Kanata, Hoshi ga Ongaku to Natta... ka no Hi" (Japanese: 遥か彼方、星が音楽となった...かの日)	Kenji Yasuda	Kenji Yasuda	September 26, 2013
As Ver escapes and starts bringing Frontier up towards space, Genjuro pursues him whilst Hibiki joins Tsubasa and Chris to search for the Nephilim heart powering Frontier, facing a giant Nephilim Ver sends after them. Meanwhile, Maria is greeted by the spirit of Serena, who sings alongside her and the world, providing Nastassja with the energy she needs to put the moon back into orbit. As Shirabe and Kirika join Hibiki and the others in fighting the Nephilim, Maria uses the relic Serena left behind to combine the power of everyone's song and defeat the Nephilim. His plans failed, Ver attempts to overload the Nephilim heart, unleashing its true form, which can absorb the power of Symphogears. Using Solomon's Cane, the girls open a gate to the Noise's dimension, pushing the Nephilim inside it, entering the dimension themselves when Maria is dragged inside too. After combining their power to break through the Nephilim and return to Earth, Miku manages to seal the gate before the Nephilim explodes, taking out all of the Noise inside the dimension. With the world safe again, Maria expresses her gratitude towards Hibiki, letting her keep the Gungnir relic.

==== Bonus episodes ====
No.	Title	Original release date
OVA1	"Not-So-Superb Songs of the Valkyries: Symphogear 1"; Transliteration: "Senki Zesshōshinai Shinfogia 1" (Japanese: 戦姫絶唱しないシンフォギア1)	February 5, 2014
A series of short skits depicting the events between the first two seasons. The girls deal with hiding out following the moon attack, Hibiki has a heartful reunion with Miku, Chris goes shopping for a peculiar item, and Tsubasa is asked to appear in a quiz show.
OVA2	"Not-So-Superb Songs of the Valkyries: Symphogear 2"; Transliteration: "Senki Zesshōshinai Shinfogia 2" (Japanese: 戦姫絶唱しないシンフォギア2)	March 5, 2014
More skits taking place at various points during the events of Symphogear G. Miku becomes jealous of Hibiki going on a mission with Chris, Maria has an awkward first impression with Tsubasa, Shirabe and Kirika sort out dinner, and Hibiki's lyrics appear to hold a particular meaning to Miku.

=== Symphogear GX (2015) ===
No. overall	No. in season	Title	Directed by	Storyboarded by	Original release date
27	1	"Murderer of Miracles"; Transliteration: "Kiseki no Satsuriku-sha" (Japanese: 奇跡の殺戮者)	Katsumi Ono	Katsumi Ono	July 4, 2015
When a shuttle bringing Nastassja's body down from the Moon starts burning up upon reentry, Hibiki, Tsubasa, and Chris are sent in to help the shuttle slow down and land safely without any casualties, promptly lopping off part of K2 in a rare appearance of Pakistan in anime. Three months later, Section Two has been reorganized into the S.O.N.G. task force, who provide disaster relief around the world, while Shirabe and Kirika join Hibiki and the others at Lydian Academy. As they get together with their friends to watch Tsubasa and Maria performing a concert in London, Hibiki and Chris are called in to rescue civilians from a fire, triggered by someone chasing after a hooded girl carrying a box. Meanwhile, Maria is attacked by a mysterious doll-like 'Autoscorer' named Phara Suyuf who can suck the life energy out of people, with Tsubasa coming to her aid. After rescuing everyone from the fire, Hibiki is confronted by a girl named Carol Malus Dienheim, who states her desire to destroy the world and attacks her with a mysterious magic.
28	2	"Before I Destroy the World..."; Transliteration: "Sekai o Kowasu, Sono Mae ni" (Japanese: 世界を壊す—その前に)	Takumi Narita	Kenji Yasuda	July 10, 2015
As Hibiki tries to reason with Carol, refusing to don her Symphogear, Chris comes into contact with another Autoscorer, Leiur Darahim. When a second enemy attacks, Chris is able to escape harm thanks to a girl named Elfnein, who reveals she comes from a world of alchemy. Meanwhile, Carol tells Hibiki that destroying the world is task given to her before retreating, leaving Hibiki shocked with thoughts of her own father before passing out. Meanwhile, as Tsubasa and Maria attempt to flee from Phara, Maria suspects that Tsubasa is the one being targeted, lamenting how she herself has been forced by the government to pretend to be an agent. Both Tsubasa and Chris are soon put into a pinch when their opponents summon Alca-Noise, a new breed of Noise that has the power to destroy their Symphogear armor.
29	3	"Twilight of the Wielders"; Transliteration: "Sōshatachi no Tasogare" (Japanese: 奏者たちの黄昏)	Tohru Ishida	Kurio Miyaura	July 17, 2015
With Tsubasa and Chris' Symphogear destroyed by the Alca-Noise, Shirabe and Kirika, despite being hindered by being unable to use LiNKER, step in to help Chris and Elfnein escape safely while the enemy dolls, having completed their mission, retreat. Later, after Tsubasa and Maria return to Japan, Elfnein explains Carol's motives to the others, presenting them with a relic known as the Dáinsleif. The next day, as Hibiki and her friends are confronted by the third Autoscorer, Garie Tuman, who summons more Alca-Noise, Hibiki, who had been conflicted about using Gungnir to fight, suddenly finds herself unable to sing the chant needed to transform.
30	4	"Gungnir, Once More"; Transliteration: "Gangunīru, Futatabi" (Japanese: ガングニール、再び)	Jin Inai	Jin Inai	July 24, 2015
As Hibiki and her friends are forced to flee, Maria arrives and uses Hibiki's relic to fight off the Alca-Noise with her Black Gungnir armor. Garie fights back, but Maria loses sync with the relic before she can destroy it, retreating instead. Wanting Hibiki to be able to sing again, Miku takes her on a walk to try to help her remember the reason she sings, only to come under attack by the fourth Autoscorer, Micha Jawkan. Pushed into a corner, Miku reminds Hibiki of all the people she saved with her power, giving her the resolve to transform once more. However, she is caught off guard by Garie's illusions and is dealt a critical blow to her relic by Micha. Determined to save Hibiki, Tsubasa and Chris prepare to go along with Elfnein's plan to counter the Alca-Noise; Project Ignite.
31	5	"Edge Works"	Shunsuke Ishikawa	Shunsuke Ishikawa	July 31, 2015
A week later, as Hibiki is still in a coma following her battle with Micha, Elfnein works on upgrading the relics with her Project Ignite, briefly experiencing some of Carol's memories of her father. When Alca-Noise attack generators to cut off the base's power supply, Shirabe and Kirika steal some LiNKER and go into battle in order to buy Elfnein some time, facing Micha in the process. As both Shirabe and Kirika's relics are destroyed by Micha and her Alca-Noise, they are saved by the arrival of Tsubasa and Chris wielding their new and improved Symphogear armor.
32	6	"Drawn Blade"; Transliteration: "Bakken" (Japanese: 抜剣)	Kazuhide Kondo	Susumu Nishizawa	August 7, 2015
Using their enhanced Symphogears, Tsubasa and Chris manage to withstand the effects of the Alca-Noise. Just then, Carol appears, using the Faust Robe of Daurdabla relic to transform into an adult form which uses her own memories as fuel for her power. Pushed by Carol's attacks, Tsubasa and Chris activate their relics' Ignite Module, in which they must fight their own impulses in order control the raw power previously seen in Hibiki's berserk form. As the two struggle to face their own burdens and regrets, they manage to snap each other out of it before they lose control. With her relic repaired, Hibiki joins the others and encourages them to try the Ignite Module once more, this time managing to overcome it and enter new forms that have the power to fight back against Carol. Having burned up the memories of her own motivation, Carol taunts Hibiki about her own cursed memory before using a capsule to burn herself to ashes.
33	7	"Carry on the Shining Light, and Stay True to Yourself"; Transliteration: "Kagayaki wo Tsugu, Kimi Rashiku" (Japanese: 輝きを継ぐ、君らしく)	Takumi Narita	Kurio Miyaura	August 15, 2015
After Maria, Shirabe, and Kirika's relics are repaired by Elfnein, everyone is sent on a training camp at the beach in order to master the upgraded Symphogear. Just as they are enjoying themselves, they come under attack by Garie, who appears to be acting without Carol's orders. Determined to prove her strength, Maria attempts to activate the Ignite Module against her, but ends up going berserk instead and winds up losing. Lamenting her defeat, Maria spends time with Elfnein, where they are once again confronted by Garie, with Phara using the distraction to sneak into their base to obtain some data. With Elfnein echoing her own advice to stay true to herself, Maria finds strength in accepting her own weakness and overcomes the Ignite Module, using her new form to defeat Garie. Later that night, as Hibiki and Miku make a run to the convenience store, Hibiki is shocked to see her father is one of the clerks.
34	8	"The Courage to Face It"; Transliteration: "Mukiau Yūki" (Japanese: 向き合う勇気)	Satoshi Oosedo	Kiyoshi Egami	August 21, 2015
Hibiki meets up with her father but refuses to hear him out, feeling he is unchanged since the day he left her family amidst all the harassment she faced following the ZweiWing incident. Joining Shirabe and Kirika on a mission to defeat some Alca-Noise attacking some underground conduits, Hibiki's anger towards both her father and herself puts her at a disadvantage against Micha, prompting Shirabe to step in to protect her and Kirika. As Shirabe and Kirika end up arguing with each other following the incident, Genjūrō determines Micha's purpose was to download conduit route data to locate hidden entrances. Later, Leiur attacks the HQ while Micha targets Shirabe and Kirika, who learn that the reason they were arguing as being unwilling to burden each other. Realizing that people get mad at them because they care, the two activate their Ignite Modules and combine their strengths to defeat Micha. Meanwhile, Carol reawakens in a spare body, able to see what the enemy is doing through Elfnein's eyes.
35	9	"The Middle of a Dream"; Transliteration: "Yume no Tochū" (Japanese: 夢の途中)	Shunsuke Ishikawa	Susumu Nishizawa	August 28, 2015
Learning that the Autoscorers may be simultaneously targeting two locations, Chris, Shirabe, and Kirika go to the Undersea Dragon's Palace, where many relics are sealed, while Tsubasa accompanies Maria to her family's mansion, where she is met with disdain from her father, Yatsuhiro. Tsubasa soon faces Phara, who overwhelms her with her ability to destroy anything defined as a sword before destroying her family's keystone. Afterwards, Tsubasa explains how the decisions of her grandfather, revealed to be her biological father, left her in a poor relationship with Yatsuhiro. When Phara attacks again later that night, she receives encouragement from Yatsuhiro to focus on her own dreams, showing that he had always cared for his daughter, allowing her to overcome her own definition as a sword and defeat Phara. Meanwhile, Chris' team confront Carol and Leiur to stop them stealing a relic, only to suddenly face Dr. Ver, who had been held captive in the palace.
36	10	"It's So Cruel, But..."; Transliteration: "Konna ni mo, Zankoku dakedo" (Japanese: こんなにも、残酷だけど)	Shigeki Hatakeyama	Kurio Miyaura	September 4, 2015
With Shirabe and Kirika unable to bring themselves to attack Ver, since he is the only one who can produce LiNKER, Chris is scolded for using her ability recklessly in trying to stop them. Meanwhile, Carol reveals to HQ that she had been using Elfnein as a mole without her knowing, while Tsubasa and Maria learn from Phara that Carol's plan is to make the wielders use Ignite Modules on the Autoscorers. Unaware of any of this, Chris, reminded of the warmth she had been seeking by Shirabe and Kirika, activates her Ignite Module and works with the others to fight back against Leiur, after which they retreat back to HQ and prepare to fight against Leiur's giant form.
37	11	"It's All Right. Everything is Just Fine."; Transliteration: "Heiki, Hecchara" (Japanese: へいき、へっちゃら)	Yuusuke Onoda	Yukio Nishimoto	September 11, 2015
Chris manages to destroy Leiur while Elfnein gets injured protecting one of the staff from the damage caused by her attacks on HQ. Meanwhile, Hibiki meets up with her father again, telling him he needs to be the one to take the first step in getting their family back together. Just then, Carol's Chateau appears in the sky, powered by both the cursed melodies gathered by the Autoscorers and the assistance of Ver. After deeming Ver of no further use and seemingly dispatching him, Carol turns her attention towards Hibiki, knocking away her relic. While seemingly running away in fear at first, Hibiki's father manages to distract Carol long enough to retrieve Hibiki's relic, helping Hibiki realise that he had always been protecting her in her own way. Hibiki is soon joined by the other wielders as they get her father to safety and once again confront Carol, as she uses her relic's Burst Mode to resonate with the Chateau as it spreads a photosphere across the entire planet. While Hibiki, Tsubasa, and Chris fight against Carol, Maria, Shirabe, and Kirika head inside the Chateau to try and shut it down, where they suddenly find themselves in the presence of what appears to be Nastassja.
38	12	"GX"	Ryota Miyazawa	Susumu Nishizawa	September 19, 2015
Maria's group flee from the fake Nastassja before them and come across Ver, who leads them to the Chateau's center. While Maria and the others face against the Chateau's defense, which takes the form of their past sins, Ver rewrites the Chateau's program with support from Elfnein in order to stop the disintegration, with the Chateau exploding with everyone still inside as a result. As Carol laments her failed plans, Elfnein explains what her father really wanted was to bring harmony to the world and give the world forgiveness. Refusing to accept this, Carol prepares to burn away all of her memories to exact her revenge, prompting Hibiki and the others to fight back with the Ignite Modules, releasing all of its safeties to try and match Carol's output. When this proves to be insufficient as well, Maria and the others arrive and combine their powers with everyone, using Carol's own phonic gain to surpass the Ignite Modules' limits and unleash their true form.
39	13	"Believe in Justice and Hold It Close"; Transliteration: "Seigi wo Shinjite, Nigirishimete" (Japanese: 正義を信じて、握り締めて)	Takumi Narita & Takashi Kobayashi	Susumu Nishizawa	September 25, 2015
Believing miracles were the thing that condemned her father to death, Carol spreads Alca-Noise across the city, the Symphogear wielders, sensing that Carol is feeling alone, fight against them. Just then, Carol prepares her ultimate weapon, a giant metal beast, but Hibiki, supported by her friends and her Armed Gear, powers through to defeat it. Just as the beast is about to explode into a miniature sun, Hibiki reaches out to save Carol, who finally remembers her father's goal; to help people understand each other. Three days later, as Carol's whereabouts remain unknown, Hibiki laments over not being able to do much for Elfnein's declining condition, but Miku gives her some support. Later that night, Elfnein is approached by Carol, who appears to have lost all of her memories, stating her desire to live and merging with Carol to become one. Afterwards, Hibiki rekindles her relationship with her father and helps their family reunite, while Elfnein becomes a member of S.O.N.G., who analyze the data left behind by Ver.

==== Bonus episodes ====
No.	Title	Original release date
OVA1	"Not-So-Superb Songs of the Valkyries GX: Symphogear"; Transliteration: "Senki Zesshōshinai Shinfogia GX" (Japanese: 戦姫絶唱しないシンフォギアGX)	November 25, 2015
Series of events taking place between G and GX. Both Hibiki's group and Maria's group pass New Year's Eve in their own ways, before Tsubasa has her graduation.
OVA2	"Not-So-Superb Songs of the Valkyries GX: Symphogear"; Transliteration: "Senki Zesshōshinai Shinfogia GX" (Japanese: 戦姫絶唱しないシンフォギアGX)	December 23, 2015
OVA3	"Not-So-Superb Songs of the Valkyries GX: Symphogear"; Transliteration: "Senki Zesshōshinai Shinfogia GX" (Japanese: 戦姫絶唱しないシンフォギアGX)	January 27, 2016
Series of short events focused on Carol, Elfnein and the Autoscorers.
OVA4	"Not-So-Superb Songs of the Valkyries GX: Symphogear"; Transliteration: "Senki Zesshōshinai Shinfogia GX" (Japanese: 戦姫絶唱しないシンフォギアGX)	February 24, 2016
Series of events taking place in various points during the first 7 episodes of Symphogear GX.

=== Symphogear AXZ (2017) ===
No. overall	No. in season	Title	Directed by	Storyboarded by	Original release date
40	1	"Val Verde Hell Screen"; Transliteration: "Baruberude Jigokuhen" (Japanese: バルベルデ地獄変)	Katsumi Ono	Katsumi Ono	July 1, 2017
The Symphogear users are dispatched to Val Verde, where a mysterious German organisation known as the Bavarian Illuminati is providing enemy forces with weaponized Alca-Noise technology. While the girls partake in various missions to stop the enemy while protecting the innocent, Chris has harsh memories of when her parents died. Meanwhile, three Bavarian Illuminati alchemists: Saint-Germain, Prelati, and Cagliostro, attack the enemy president and convert him and his subordinates into energy. When SONG agents stumble across them trying to retrieve an Autoscorer known as Tiki encased in crystal from the president's opera house hideout, the alchemists use the energy and summon a giant serpent to attack them. Just as the agents are driven into a corner, Maria, Shirabe, and Kirika arrive to help them out.
41	2	"Last Resort"; Transliteration: "Rasuto Rizōto" (Japanese: ラストリゾート)	Takumi Narita	Kenji Yasuda	July 8, 2017
Maria's team fight against the alchemists' snake monster, only to discover it can regenerate itself, forcing them to retreat until the alchemists call it back. Meanwhile, Hibiki's team follow a boy named Stephan Virena back to his village, which has been taken hostage by enemy forces. Upon distracting the enemy so that the Symphogear users can attack, Stephan gets caught by a Noise, forcing Chris to shoot off his leg to save him from disintegrating entirely. This decision leads to Chris getting lashed at by Stephan's sister, Sonia, who she used to be friends with until her parents' death. While Chris and the others rush Stephan to the hospital, Maria's team face Prelati and Cagliostro as they launch a Noise attack on an airport. Despite running low on LiNKER, the girls manage to surpass their limits thanks to Elfnein's encouragement. The alchemists summon the serpent again, but it is quickly destroyed after Hibiki arrives on the scene.
42	3	"The Horoscope Drawn By Gears"; Transliteration: "Haguruma ga Kaku Horosukōpu" (Japanese: 歯車が描くホロスコープ)	Hirokazu Yamada	Katsumi Ono	July 15, 2017
After Tsubasa and Chris join Hibiki on the scene, Saint-Germain joins Prelati and Cagliostro, revealing that they know of Finé and stating that they are fighting for the future before retreating. While Saint-Germain revives Tiki, Prelati and Cagliostro launch an Alca-Noise attack on Tsubasa and Maria as they are sent to escort an important briefcase containing intel from Val Verde, but they safely make it through and deliver the briefcase to SONG. Afterwards, as Hibiki and the others are called out to another Alca-Noise attack, Saint-Germain uses a new type of Alca-Noise to surround them in a subspace pocket that makes the Alca-Noise resistant to normal Symphogear attacks, forcing the girls to activate their Ignite Modules to hold them off. With Elfnein's help, however, Chris manages to use everyone's singing as a sonar to locate the Alca-Noise creating the barrier and destroy it.
43	4	"Gold Making"; Transliteration: "Ougon Rensei" (Japanese: 黄金錬成)	Takahiro Tamano	Kenji Yasuda	July 22, 2017
While SONG investigates a special code from the intel they received, Maria, Shirabe, and Kirika are sent to help evacuate citizens when they are confronted by Cagliostro. With Maria and the others unable to fight due to lacking LiNKER, Chris arrives on the scene to help them out, soon joined by Hibiki and Tsubasa, forcing Cagliostro to retreat. Later, as Hibiki's team use their Ignite Modules to fight off some Alca-Noise, Saint-Germain's team activate Faust Robes of their own, which manage to force the girls out of their Ignite states. Just then, Saint-Germain's leader, Adam Weishaupt, arrives on the scene and unleashes a powerful attack, forcing Maria's group to overcome their lack of LiNKER to rescue their comrades.
44	5	"Risking Your Life in a Fictional Theater"; Transliteration: "Kyokō Sen'iki ni Inochi o Toshite" (Japanese: 虚構戦域に命を賭して)	Keiichi Matsuki	Kenji Yasuda	July 29, 2017
The Symphogear users narrowly escape Adam's blast, with Maria managing to avoid heavily damaging feedback from their rescue. The next day, as Shirabe and Kirika try risky training in order to fight without relying on LiNKER, Elfnein theorises that the final key to analysing Ver's LiNKER formula lies in a power that awakened in Maria's Symphogear during desperate times. To investigate this possibility, Elfnein uses a mind transfer machine to enter Maria's memories, experiencing all the hardships while training under Nastassja. As Elfnein manages to join up with Maria's fighting spirit, they are both caught up in a strange field where they encounter Dr. Ver. Meanwhile, the alchemists summon another beast to attack SONG headquarters, prompting Hibiki and the others into action.
45	6	"Emerging From the Deathbed"; Transliteration: "Kesshi-ken Kara no Fujō" (Japanese: 決死圏からの浮上)	Shunsuke Ishikawa	Shunsuke Ishikawa	August 5, 2017
Maria and Elfnein find themselves in the depths of Maria's heart containing all of her fears and doubts. Just as she becomes swallowed up by the thoughts, she comes to understand that Nastassja cared more for her than she realized, giving Elfnein the key to finishing the LiNKER formula; love. Meanwhile, Hibiki's team are brought to exhaustion upon fighting a regenerating Alca-Noise, at which point the alchemists launch another Alca-Noise fortress towards Lidia. However, the fortress is stopped by the arrival of Maria's team, who are now able to fight freely thanks to Elfnein's completed LiNKER formula. Afterwards, the girls confront the alchemists, who reveal the purpose of their plan.
46	7	"ARCANA No.00"	Takumi Narita	Susumu Nishizawa	August 12, 2017
The alchemists revealed the purpose of their plan, which is to use the power of the Gods to destroy the curse of Balal, by seizing the Lunar Ruins. After that, they attacked the girls, and when Kirika and Shirabe activated their Ignite Modules, Prelati immediately deactivated their Ignite states with her Faust Robe, defeating both Kirika and Shirabe easily. Hibiki then tries to reason with Saint-Germain, but Saint-Germain still refuses to join forces with her and vows to destroy her and the rest of the Symphogear just before the alchemists retreated. Later that night, Hibiki asked Miku if her choices are reckless, in which Miku responds that she likes the way she was doing to help people. Meanwhile, Elfnein just witnessed a clump of waste matter that was transmuted by Hibiki, so she proposed a Symphogear upgrade plan in order to cancel the Philosopher's Stone's effects. In the next day, the girls went out to search for that waste matter known as the "Fool's Stone", as named by Chris. Just then, Cagliostro and Prelati ambushed Chris, Kirika, and Shirabe, while Hibiki, Tsubasa, and Maria are underwater trying to find that stone. Prelati gained the upper hand against Shirabe, but Kirika, with the help of Chris and by distracting Cagliostro, managed to save Shirabe just in time. Together, Kirika and Shirabe combined their Symphogear attacks, defeating Prelati as she explodes, forcing Cagliostro to retreat. Elsewhere, Adam wants Saint-Germain to sacrifice one of the alchemists in order to complete the altar ritual, however, she remains unsure.
47	8	"Between the Past and the Future"; Transliteration: "Kako to Mirai no Hazama de" (Japanese: 過去と未来の狭間で)	Takahiro Tamano	Kurio Miyaura	August 19, 2017
The girls find the ultimate weapon against the Philosopher's Stone that is the Fool's Stone. Later, Genjuro has the girls train so they can realise they cannot rely only on the stone against the Alchemists. Meanwhile, even though Cagliostro overheard Adam telling Saint-Germain about sacrificing either her or Prelati, Cagliostro went out to destroy the Symphogears. The next day, Chris and Tsubasa went to a restaurant to meet with Stephan and Sonia. Just as Chris was about to say something to Sonia regarding the past, Cagliostro ambushed Chris and Tsubasa. The rest of the girls showed up for battle, but Cagliostro sends four girls to the subspace, leaving only Chris and Maria. Cagliostro was about to finish Chris off, however, Stephan managed to save Chris and tells her, as well as Sonia, to stop thinking about the past and that he will live on for the better future. Thanks to Stephan's words, Chris, along with Maria, activated their Ignite modes, only this time, Cagliostro's Faust Robe has no effect on it due to the Fool's stone upgrade. Together, Chris and Maria killed Cagliostro, while the rest of the girls return from the subspace. Later that night, Tiki notices that Cagliostro is dead, meaning that Adam will now sacrifice Prelati to complete the altar ritual, but when Saint-Germain tries to stop him, he warns her that she does not wield the power of the Gods.
48	9	"Blue Rabbit"; Transliteration: "Aoi Usagi" (Japanese: 碧いうさぎ)	Daisuke Tsukushi	Daisuke Tsukushi	August 26, 2017
Shirabe and Tsubasa train for their unison attack, but even after Shinji Ogawa trained her, Shirabe is not used to work together with anyone else but Kirika. Later, the girls went to a shrine that has rabbit statues where a priest lives there and explains to them about the Hikawa shrines and the gate to the divine power. Later that night, Shirabe is still being troubled with being unwilling to work with others, so the priest tries to make her understand that she cannot reject help. Meanwhile, Prelati knew that Adam was planning to sacrifice her after hearing Cagliostro's words while she was injured. Feeling betrayed, she ran away to warn Saint-Germain about Adam's plan. When Shirabe finds out that Prelati is on the road, she confronts her, with Tsubasa following Shirabe. Prelati begins attacking them, and Shirabe is once again being troubled, but after Tsubasa encouraged her that she has the power to protect everyone, Shirabe and Tsubasa activated their upgraded Ignite modes, in which Prelati's Faust Robe has no effect on it. With their combined powers, Tsubasa and Shirabe killed Prelati. Elsewhere, Adam and Tiki called Saint-Germain to inform her that Prelati is dead, and since she is the only Alchemist left alive, Adam wants her to come back to him. The next day, the priest gives Shirabe a good-luck charm before she and the rest of the girls return to SONG headquarters.
49	10	"An Tiki Tira"; Transliteration: "An Tiki Tira" (Japanese: アン・ティキ・ティラ)	Keiichi Matsuki	Susumu Nishizawa	September 9, 2017
With Hibiki's birthday coming up, Kirika decides to plan for her birthday party, though Chris reminds her about her past mistake during her fight against Cagliostro. Meanwhile, despite feeling uncomfortable by Adam's plan, Saint-Germain decides to sacrifice her own life to complete the altar ritual for Tiki in order to open the gate to the divine power. However, Genjuro and Yatsuhiro activate the keystone, stopping the ritual on time. Hibiki and Kirika then arrive and activate their upgraded Ignite modes to fight Saint-Germain one last time. Saint-Germain gains the upper hand, but in a last ditch effort, Hibiki and Kirika defeat Saint-Germain with their unison attack. However, rather than killing her, Hibiki spares Saint-Germain's life and wants her to join forces with her, to which Saint-Germain agrees to do so. Just then, Adam appears and re-activates the altar ritual by the stars to open the Divine Gate. He then uses Tiki to fire the massive laser to kill the girls and Saint-Germain, but then, Kirika sings her Superb Song to stop the energy blast, only for her to fall in battle. With Kirika brutally wounded due to an overdose of LiNKER, Hibiki and Saint-Germain fight Adam to prevent Tiki from opening the Divine Gate.
50	11	"Pinnacle of Divine Might"; Transliteration: "Kamoi Kakuyaku no Kiwami ni Tasshi" (Japanese: 神威赫奕の極みに達し)	Yuusuke Onoda	Kurio Miyaura	September 16, 2017
In order to completely stop Tiki from opening the Divine Gate, Hibiki and Saint-Germain have to get through Adam. As the fight begins, Adam gains the upper hand, but Hibiki and Saint-Germain work together to fight back. Although Saint-Germain manages to cut his arm, she and Hibiki soon realize that Adam is a robot made and rejected by the Custodians, as he called them 'they.' However, Hibiki and Saint-Germain are too late, Tiki opens the Divine Gate and transformed into a Divine Weapon. As Tiki is about to destroy the city, Hibiki punches her to stop her, but in the process, a satellite is destroyed, and Hibiki falls unconscious. Back at SONG HQ, Genjuro receives a message from Shinji with information about the "God-Slayer". Shinji then tells him that the "God-Slayer" is, in fact, Gungnir. Back on the battlefield, Hibiki regains consciousness and continues to fight Tiki while Saint-Germain deals with Adam, who uses his robotic arm as a sword. Thanks to the power of Gungnir, Tiki cannot regenerate herself when damaged. Hibiki then uses all the power she had to destroy Tiki once and for all. When Adam has no use for the dying Tiki anymore, he tries to use his robotic arm to absorb the power of the Gods released from her. However, that power is transferred to Hibiki instead, transforming her into a giant cocoon.
51	12	"AXZ"	Takahiro Tamano	Kurio Miyaura	September 23, 2017
With Hibiki turned into a giant cocoon, the UN prepares for combat. Meanwhile, Elfnein has found out a way to turn Hibiki back to normal, which is injecting her with an Anti-LiNKER. Genjuro then calls Miku as their "trump card" in order to bring Hibiki back. Later, Saint-Germain agrees to assist SONG HQ, though she would prefer to do it on her own. As the army began to attack the cocoon, it soon hatches and Hibiki has now transformed into a Divine Weapon, and is out of control when she begins to attack. with the girls and Saint-Germain arriving, they hold Hibiki off, giving the members of SONG HQ a chance to inject her with an Anti-LiNKER. Despite their best efforts, Hibiki has broken free from the girls. However, after hearing Miku's voice and being reminded that it is her birthday, Hibiki finally breaks free from the Divine Power. Unfortunately, a nuclear missile has been launched by America, heading straight to the location where the girls are. With no other choice, Saint-Germain decides to stop the missile while singing, with the help of Cagliostro and Prelati, who had faked their deaths after their last battles. The Alchemists sacrifice themselves to completely stop a massive explosion. Just as it is all over, Adam uses his robotic arm to finally absorb the Divine Power. However, Tiki, who is somehow alive, stops him from acquiring the Divine Power, giving Hibiki a chance to destroy Adam's arm, along with the Divine Power itself, permanently.
52	13	"By Shedding Many Tears, the Reality You Face is..." Transliteration: "Namida wo Kasaneru Tabi, Shōmei sareru Genjitsu wa" (Japanese: 涙を重ねる度、証明される現実は)	Takumi Narita & Katsumi Ono	Katsumi Ono	September 30, 2017
After destroying the Divine Power, Hibiki briefly grieves over Saint-Germain's death. At S.O.N.G. headquarters, Elfnein and the others realize that the Alchemists used their Philosopher's Stones perfect purification to nullify the missile, but at a great cost of losing their lives in the process. Hibiki wanted to socialize with Saint-Germain when she wished none of it had happened and they could have found mutual understanding. Then, as Adam destroys the remains of Tiki, he told the girls that because the Curse of Balal, no one will never reach mutual understanding. However, Hibiki lectures Adam that trying to understand people were never in vain and the girls also told him that failure leads to success. Furious that he was lectured by the girls, Adam summons an entire army of Alca-Noise. The girls managed to destroy the Alca-Noise, while Hibiki gets through them to fight Adam. When he is finally weakened, Hibiki used all of her power to hit him. However, Adam's new arm was regenerated, and with that, he showed his true form: A giant robotic demon (as he said that he will have to don the Devil's horns). Adam easily overpowers the girls. While in the decisive battle with Adam, Hibiki heard Saint-Germain's voice and saw her spellcaster gun. As Hibiki tries to get the gun, Adam grabs it and uses the Faust Robe's manifestation energy against Hibiki. When Adam makes his finishing blow, the girls are forced to sing their Superb Song to drain the Faust Robe's energy, with the help of Elfnein and the other operators who used a bypass to divert some of the strain to the Dainsleif in order for them to not explode. Afterwards, the girls transform their Symphogears into their Last Ignition mode. They manage to fight back Adam, but Hibiki is left vulnerable when her gear was uncleaned of the aftereffects. As Adam makes his finishing blow again, the other girls manage to save Hibiki by transferring their Symphogear powers to her. Hibiki, in her Armed Gear form, used all of the powers from the girls to fight back Adam, but he grabs her in attempting to crush her. While doing that, Adam told Hibiki and girls that the Custodians (or Annunaki) were coming to earth (in response to the first and second season when the Curse of Balal is in danger). Fortunately, Chris tells Hibiki break free from Adam's grasp with Armor Purge. After Hibiki transforms one more time, only this time with the help of the spirits of the Alchemists (who will live inside of Hibiki from now on), Hibiki's Gungnir is now turned into a Chrysopoeia form. With that power from the Alchemists, Hibiki finally destroys Adam once and for all when she unleashes a fury of punches that raise him in the air and punches his chest one more time to powering her fists and getting through his torso. Before he explodes into oblivion, Adam share his last words and said: "You may have slaughtered me, but there is no hope for this world. In your tomorrow, in your future lies only despair." Three days later after Adam's death, Elfnein wants to investigate the events about how Hibiki manage to become a vessel for the Divine Power and S.O.N.G. were working with intelligence agencies to hunt down the remnants of the Pavarian Illuminati after their organization is left divided. Genjuro wonders if what Adam said the threat of the Custodians and how to deal with them in the future. At evening, Fudou and Yastuhiro are discussing that America is prohibited from intervening with other countries for the period of a century. Fudou witnessed the Divine Power that rivaled the gods and recommends that Japan should have that kind of power so they could deal with invaders or the loss of others who got killed in further supernatural disasters. Later that night, the girls celebrate Hibiki's birthday at Miku's house. Afterwards, Hibiki asks Miku if what she was doing was right, in which Miku responds that she will always believe in her no matter what. In the epilogue, Elfnein informs Genjuro about Hibiki and the Curse of Balal, and that another besides Hibiki was struck by the Shenshou Jing's light, the other person who was also struck by it was none other than Miku.

==== Bonus episodes ====
No.	Title	Original release date
OVA1	"Not-So-Superb Songs of the Valkyries AXZ: Symphogear"; Transliteration: "Senki Zesshōshinai Shinfogia AXZ" (Japanese: 戦姫絶唱しないシンフォギアAXZ)	November 29, 2017
Series of events taking place between GX and AXZ.
OVA2	"Not-So-Superb Songs of the Valkyries AXZ: Symphogear"; Transliteration: "Senki Zesshōshinai Shinfogia AXZ" (Japanese: 戦姫絶唱しないシンフォギアAXZ)	December 27, 2017
OVA3	"Not-So-Superb Songs of the Valkyries AXZ: Symphogear"; Transliteration: "Senki Zesshōshinai Shinfogia AXZ" (Japanese: 戦姫絶唱しないシンフォギアAXZ)	January 31, 2018
Series of events focused on the alchemists, taking place before and after the Symphogear 3.5 story arc (exclusive of the game Symphogear XD Unlimited, which takes place between GX and AXZ), and right before the events of AXZ.
OVA4	"Not-So-Superb Songs of the Valkyries AXZ: Symphogear"; Transliteration: "Senki Zesshōshinai Shinfogia AXZ" (Japanese: 戦姫絶唱しないシンフォギ AXZ)	February 28, 2018
Series of events taking place in various points during and after the events of Symphogear AXZ.

=== Symphogear XV (2019) ===
No. overall	No. in season	Title (Note: All English titles are taken from Crunchyroll.)	Directed by	Storyboarded by	Original release date
53	1	"From Beyond Human History"; Transliteration: "Jinrui-shi no Kanata kara" (Japanese: 人類史の彼方から)	Fumiaki Kouta	Katsumi Ono	July 6, 2019
Going off of data retrieved from Tiki's remains, the Symphogear users head to Antarctica, where they are confronted by a powerful automated "coffin" that Adam was investigating. Despite the overwhelming odds, Hibiki and the others manage to destroy the coffin, inside of which they find the corpse of a Custodian.
54	2	"The Day The Sky Falls"; Transliteration: "Sora ga Ochiru Hi" (Japanese: 天空(ソラ)が堕ちる日)	Hiroki Hirano	Hiroki Hirano	July 13, 2019
On the way back from Antarctica, a remnant alchemist of the Bavarian Illuminati, Elza, attempts to retrieve the Custodian's corpse, but is forced to retreat by Shirabe and Kirika. Later, as Tsubasa becomes too worried about the attack to focus on her concert, Maria gives her some encouragement and ends up performing with her during the concert. However, another alchemist, Millaarc, sends Alca-Noise to attack the concert, slaughtering practically everyone in attendance and placing a seal on Tsubasa, who is left emotionally devastated. Meanwhile, as the corpse is analysed by the Americans, it turns into dust when the bracelet on its wrist is scanned.
55	3	"Penny Dreadful"	Tenpei Mishio	Tomohiro Furukawa	July 20, 2019
Hibiki and Chris are sent into action after Elza and Millaarc attempt to silence a delinquent that witnessed a deal between them and some men in suits. Retrieving a briefcase filled with a rare type of blood that was dropped by Elza, S.O.N.G. deduce from the delinquent's account that an organization is helping the alchemists. Shortly after awakening from her ordeal, Tsubasa is further shaken from harsh words from Fudou, who states her strength is not enough to protect people. Later that night, Kirika and Shirabe confront Millaarc after she targets a hospital for more blood, but she escapes thanks to Vanessa, the third alchemist of their group known as Noble Red. Afterwards, it is revealed that Vanessa, who now possesses the Bracelet of Shem-Ha found on the corpse, is working together with Fudou.
56	4	"The Name of the Flower is Amalgam"; Transliteration: "Hana no Na wa, Amarugamu" (Japanese: 花の名は、アマルガム)	Ayataka Tanemura	Ayataka Tanemura	July 27, 2019
As Fudou and Noble Red attempt to activate the Bracelet of Shem-Ha, one of suited men before, who is about to be killed for his failure, attempts to use it for himself, only to be destroyed by it. With their hideout destroyed by the resulting explosion, Vanessa distracts Hibiki and Maria to help the others escape to a new location, revealing that she and others want to regain their human bodies. Discovering that Vanessa was planted with a tracking device during the battle, Noble Red lures the Symphogear wielders inside a labyrinth to attack them from all sides. However, Hibiki is aided by the spirit of Saint-Germain inside of her and granted a new power known as Amalgam. Just as Hibiki gains the upper hand and tries to reach out to Vanessa, S.O.N.G. is raided by the Japanese government, who demand that they abort their mission.
57	5	"The Hidden Thing in the Bag"; Transliteration: "Kaban no Kakushi Koto" (Japanese: かばんの隠し事)	Takumi Narita	Hiroki Hirano	August 3, 2019
Citing Hibiki's Amalgam as an unknown weapon, the supposed inspector from the Japanese government commences an inspection of S.O.N.G. HQ, forcing the wielders to take some days off. Meanwhile, it is revealed that Fudou convinced Noble Red to aid his plan in exchange for the blood they need to survive after they escaped the Bavarian Illuminati. As Hibiki and Miku invite Tsubasa and Elfnein to join them on their day off, Miku lashes out at Hibiki for not being considerate of Tsubasa's feelings. Just then, an Alca-Noise attack occurs nearby, with an illusional effect that Millaarc cast on Tsubasa during their last battle causing her to envision the enemy as Millaarc and go berserk in her attacks. Meanwhile, the real Millaarc uses the battle as a distraction to chase down Miku and Elfnein.
58	6	"Xenoglossia"; Transliteration: "Zenogurashia" (Japanese: ゼノグラシア)	Takahiro Tamano	Katsumi Ono	August 10, 2019
Miku and Elfnein are kidnapped by Noble Red and brought to the Chateau du Triffages to further their plans, involving both the Bracelet and a mysterious device. Meanwhile, as the wielders learn that Miku is a potential vessel for a god, Vanessa targets Shinji in order to retrieve some evidence that would link them back to their hideout. As Maria and Chris are sent to stop her, a golden light shines from the castle, where the mysterious Shem-Ha emerges.
59	7	"Cutting the Tangled Thread"; Transliteration: "Motsureta Ito o Tachikitte" (Japanese: もつれた糸を断ち切って)	Tenpei Mishio	Tenpei Mishio	August 17, 2019
After Millaarc attempts to use mind control to have Elfnein activate the Chateau, the bracelet goes out of control and spawns Shem-Ha, who proves too powerful for Hibiki to defeat. Retreating to base, the gang learn that the waveform used by the creature is similar to a song Maria used to sing. Back at the Chateau, Elfnein's plea for help causes the Autoscorers, whose spare bodies were chained to the reactor, to reactivate and come to her aid. As the Autoscorers are all defeated trying to hold off Noble Red until reinforcements arrive, Elfnein manages to call upon Carol's powers to defend herself.
60	8	"XV"	Hiroki Hirano	Hiroki Hirano	August 24, 2019
Reawakening inside Elfnein's body, Carol manages to fend off Noble Red and get in touch with SONG, instructing them to deal with Shem-Ha while she tries to rescue Miku. As the wielders struggle to utilize their phonic gain without Hibiki, Noble Red attempt a second attack on Carol by trapping her in the labyrinth, but Carol uses up her power to both break out of the labyrinth and provide the others with the phonic gain they need. Returning to the fray, Hibiki is aided by the others and uses Amalgam to break her way inside through the enemy's attack, only to discover that Shem-Ha has taken over Miku's body.
61	9	"I am a father"	Takumi Narita	Katsumi Ono	August 31, 2019
Just as Miku tries to resist Shem-Ha's control, Fudou uses the seal placed on Tsubasa by Millaarc to have her turn against the others and bring Miku to him as part of his plan. Joining a raid of the Kazanari household, Maria clashes off against Tsubasa, managing to slap some sense into her and break the seal on her. Fudou attempts to shoot Tsubasa for disobeying him, only for Yatsuhiro to sacrifice himself protecting her. Meanwhile, Noble Red, who were betrayed by Fudou, attempt to steal Miku to use Shem-Ha's power for their own gain, only for Miku to cut them down and break free. Standing against Fudou, Tsubasa manages to get approval to use Amalgam to overpower him, but Genjurou steps in to prevent her from killing him because if she were to kill Fudou then Tsubasa will turn out no better than her grandfather (which is why Yatsuhiro drove her out of the Kanzanari family). At that moment, a device activates on the Moon.
62	10	"Not a Crude Color of Rust"; Transliteration: "Iyashiki Sabiiro ni Hizu" (卑しき錆色に非ず)	Takahiro Tamano	Katsumi Ono	September 7, 2019
Maria attempts to take on Shem-Ha, only to discover she has revived Noble Red as more complete monsters and recruited them to her side, forcing Maria to retreat while Shem-Ha rises a tower known as Yggdrasil. Fudou was apprehended and awaiting trial for his crimes, cursing Genjurou that songs cannot save the world and the Power of God unifies humanity. With a research team scheduled to be sent to the moon to investigate lunar ruins that are reacting to Yggdrasil, the wielders are tasked with protecting the rocket from Noble Red, who have become more powerful due to Shem-Ha's improvements. Although the rocket is destroyed, Kirika and Shirabe use their Amalgams to overpower Elza before Tsubasa allows the wielders to hijack Noble Red's teleportation spell, sending them to the lunar ruins.
63	11	"In The Beginning Was The Word"; Transliteration: "Hajime ni Kotoba Ariki" (Japanese: ハジメニコトバアリキ)	Hiroki Hirano & Hiroyuki Takashima	Shunsuke Machitani	September 14, 2019
Both the wielders and Noble Red are spread across the lunar base Marduk, having to deal with its automated defenses. Meanwhile, Maria's relic leads her and Tsubasa to Marduk's core, whether they speak with an operating system based on the mind of Enki. Enki reveals that Shem-Ha had instilled herself a data fragment in all human beings, forcing him to seal her using the Curse of Balal, which Shem-Ha now seeks to destroy in order to control all of humanity with Yggdrasil. Tsubasa and Maria are confronted by Millaarc, who uses a clone of herself to fight against them, but the two use their unified songs and Amalgams to defeat her. Back on Earth, however, Yggdrasil towers start raising all over the planet.
64	12	"Senki Zessho"; Transliteration: "Senki Zesshō" (Japanese: 戦姫絶唱)	Tenpei Mishio	Hidekazu Sato & Masato Satou	September 21, 2019
Despite Elfnein and Carol's attempt to stop her, Shem-Ha begins using the world's computer networks to have Yggdrasil cover the entire globe in a barrier. Back on the moon, Hibiki and Chris face off against Vanessa, ultimately saving her and the others from being sucked into space. However, Shem-Ha takes control of Vanessa and uses her to install a virus in the Marduk's network in order to destroy it, forcing Noble Red to use the last of their strength to send the wielders back to Earth, resulting to their deaths similar to how Saint-Germain and her friends risked their lives to save the others. With humanity working together to hold back Shem-Ha's hacking attempt, the wielders activate their X-Drive in preparation for their final battle against Shem-Ha.
65	13	"Let's Make History With A Light That Even the Gods Don't Know"; Transliteration: "Kami-sama mo Shiranai Hikari de Rekishi o Tsukurō" (Japanese: 神様も知らないヒカリで歴史を創ろう)	Takumi Narita & Katsumi Ono	Katsumi Ono	September 28, 2019
As Shem-Ha brings out her final form to fight the wielders, Carol burns up her memories to protect them from Shem-Ha's attack. Shem-Ha then begins using her bio-terminal network to take control of all of humanity, but Hibiki (immuned to Shem-Ha's control due to the after effects of Shen Shou Jing), fueled by determination to save Miku, manages to disrupt Shem-Ha's power and finally drive her out of Miku's body. With Yggdrasil still active and is about to transform the entire Earth, Miku once again dons the Shen Shōjing armor. She was told by the late Carol and explained to the wielders that even if they managed to destroy one of Yggdrasil's core, another one will finish the job and will destroy the planet. Elfnein told the girls that their seven songs can overcome the will of god (just like what it did to Shem-Ha). The others use their united Climax Song, allowing them to simultaneously destroy all the Yggdrasil cores around the world, shutting down Yggdrasil permanently. Before, the girls escape, their symphogears are starting to break down due to their Swan Songs and what's worse is that Shem-Ha (who manage gather all her fragments to her body) captures the girls in order to take them to hell with her. Hibiki and Miku confronts Shem-Ha in a spiritual plane. Shem-Ha angrily asks Miku why did she refuse to become one with her. Miku lectures Shem-Ha that if she were to be one with her, then they will never understand each other anyway and Miku will never destroy the feelings of love and care for others. Hibiki tells Shem-Ha that even if everyone gets hurt, they will make a history with a light even Gods did not know. Giving up her life, Shem-Ha uses every last of her remains to save the girls entrusting them that the future is in their hands (The stain of holding her fragments causes them to disappear without a trace along with her soul, but her soul and fragments is all she needs to save the wielders from their doom). With Shem-Ha gone and the world finally restored to normal, Tsubasa and Genjirou visits Yatsuhiro's grave and bids him a last farewell. Later at night, Hibiki and Miku finally tell each other their true feelings.

==== Bonus episodes ====
No.	Title	Original release date
OVA1	"Not-So-Superb Songs of the Valkyries XV: Symphogear"; Transliteration: "Senki Zesshōshinai Shinfogia XV" (Japanese: 戦姫絶唱しないシンフォギアXV)	December 4, 2019
Series of events taking place between the first two episodes of XV, focusing particularly on Chris's birthday.
OVA2	"Not-So-Superb Songs of the Valkyries XV: Symphogear"; Transliteration: "Senki Zesshōshinai Shinfogia XV" (Japanese: 戦姫絶唱しないシンフォギアXV)	January 8, 2020
The events of the episode are set in part between AXZ and XV, and in part during the seventh episode of the latter. Elfnein tries to awake Carol's memories in her body, thought they did not want her to. In the meantime, Sakuya and Aoi are spending their night shift thinking about their last mission, which the former thinks as the cause of its recent nightmares. Time later, as Elfnein has been put in a corner by Noble Red, Carol's memories decide to awake to help her.
OVA3	"Not-So-Superb Songs of the Valkyries XV: Symphogear"; Transliteration: "Senki Zesshōshinai Shinfogia XV" (Japanese: 戦姫絶唱しないシンフォギアXV)	February 5, 2020
OVA4	"Not-So-Superb Songs of the Valkyries XV: Symphogear"; Transliteration: "Senki Zesshōshinai Shinfogia XV" (Japanese: 戦姫絶唱しないシンフォギ XV)	March 4, 2020
