= Laminacauda dysphorica =

Scientific classification
- Domain: Eukaryota
- Kingdom: Animalia
- Phylum: Arthropoda
- Subphylum: Chelicerata
- Class: Arachnida
- Order: Araneae
- Infraorder: Araneomorphae
- Family: Linyphiidae
- Genus: Laminacauda
- Species: L. dysphorica

Binomial name
- Laminacauda dysphorica (Keyserling, 1886)

Species of spider

Laminacauda dysphorica is a species of sheet weaver found in Bolivia and Peru.

== Taxonomy ==
Laminacauda dysphorica was first described by Eugen von Keyserling in 1886, as Erigone dysphorica. It was transferred to the genus Laminacauda by J. A. Miller in 2007.
