= Laminacauda vicana =

Scientific classification
- Domain: Eukaryota
- Kingdom: Animalia
- Phylum: Arthropoda
- Subphylum: Chelicerata
- Class: Arachnida
- Order: Araneae
- Infraorder: Araneomorphae
- Family: Linyphiidae
- Genus: Laminacauda
- Species: L. vicana

Binomial name
- Laminacauda vicana (Keyserling, 1886)

Species of spider

Laminacauda vicana is a species of sheet weaver found in Peru. It was described by Keyserling in 1886.
