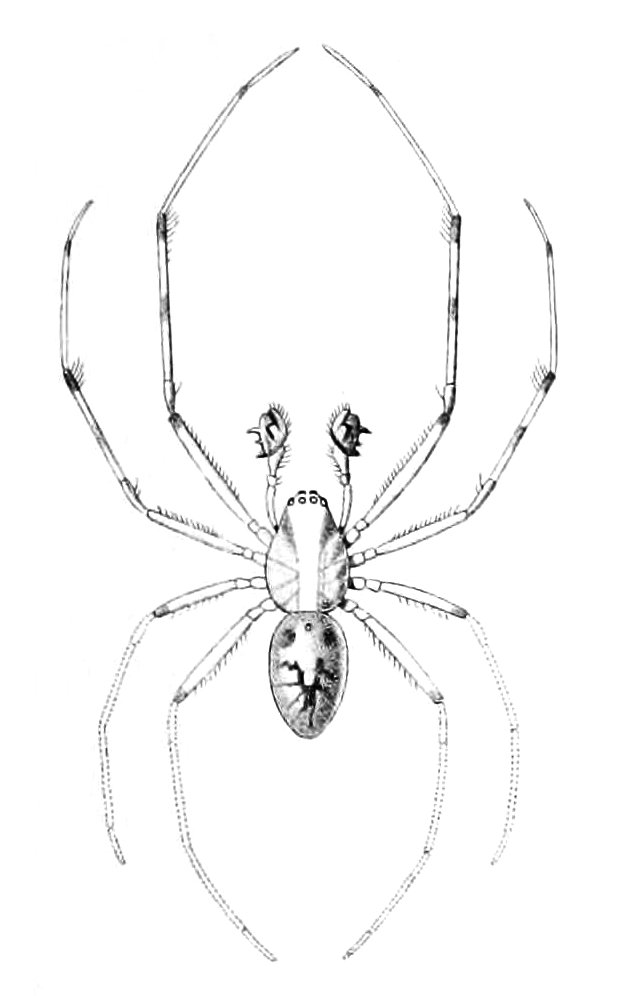
- Male, illustrated in 1900

Scientific classification
- Domain: Eukaryota
- Kingdom: Animalia
- Phylum: Arthropoda
- Subphylum: Chelicerata
- Class: Arachnida
- Order: Araneae
- Infraorder: Araneomorphae
- Family: Linyphiidae
- Genus: Orsonwelles
- Species: O. malus

Binomial name
- Orsonwelles malus Hormiga, 2002
- Distribution in the Hawaiian Islands

= Orsonwelles malus =

Species of spider

Orsonwelles malus is a species of spider endemic to Kauai in the Hawaiian Islands. It was described 2002, although the first individual of O. malus was collected in the 1890s. With individuals exceeding 14 mm (0.55 in), it is the largest species in the family Linyphiidae. Females range from 8.93 to 14.07 mm in total length (length of carapace + abdomen) while males range from 8.74 to 10.66 mm. O. malus spiders are found in northwest Kauai, in the Alakai Wilderness and Kona Nā Pali areas, at elevations of 985 to 1,263 m (3,232 to 4,144 ft), where webs are commonly found in the non-native New Zealand laurel (Corynocarpus laevigatus).
