= Laminacauda newtoni =

Scientific classification
- Domain: Eukaryota
- Kingdom: Animalia
- Phylum: Arthropoda
- Subphylum: Chelicerata
- Class: Arachnida
- Order: Araneae
- Infraorder: Araneomorphae
- Family: Linyphiidae
- Genus: Laminacauda
- Species: L. newtoni

Binomial name
- Laminacauda newtoni Millidge, 1985

Species of spider

Laminacauda newtoni is a species of sheet weaver found in Chile and Argentina. It was described by Millidge in 1985.
