= Orsonwelles torosus =

Scientific classification
- Kingdom: Animalia
- Phylum: Arthropoda
- Subphylum: Chelicerata
- Class: Arachnida
- Order: Araneae
- Infraorder: Araneomorphae
- Family: Linyphiidae
- Genus: Orsonwelles
- Species: O. torosus

Binomial name
- Orsonwelles torosus (Simon, 1900)
- Original range in the Hawaiian Islands

Synonyms
- Labulla torosa Simon, 1900

Species of spider

Orsonwelles torosus is a species of linyphiid spider endemic to Kauai in the Hawaiian Islands. It was described in 1900 by the French naturalist Eugène Simon based on a specimen collected in the 1890s, but has not been collected since, and is presumed extinct.
