= South Down =

South Down may refer to:

- South Down (Assembly constituency), for the Northern Ireland Assembly
- South Down (Northern Ireland Parliament constituency)
- South Down (UK Parliament constituency)
- South Down GAA, hurling team

== See also ==
- Southdown (disambiguation)
- South Downs, England, a range of hills
- Down south (disambiguation)
- Electoral district of Southern Downs, Queensland, Australia
- Arundel and South Downs (UK Parliament constituency)
