= Up North =

Up North may refer to:

== Regions ==
- Northern England
- Northern Wisconsin, including the Northern Highland, Lake Superior Lowland, Door County, and various other locations with an affluence of lakes and second homes, by residents of the Chicago and Milwaukee metropolitan areas.
- Northern Minnesota, including the North Shore, Boundary Waters Canoe Area Wilderness, Superior National Forest, and other areas north of the Twin Cities with an abundance of lakes and personal cabins, by residents of Minnesota.
- Northern Michigan, by residents of the lower peninsula of Michigan
- Northern Saskatchewan, by residents of Southern Saskatchewan

== Media ==
- Up North (book), a 1992 book by Charles Jennings
- Up North (film), a 2018 Nigerian film
- Up North, a comedy series on the Essex TV website, Sheffield Live
- Up North Combine, a British amalgamation of pigeon racing clubs
- "Up North (Down South, Back East, Out West)", a song by Wade Hayes from the album Highways & Heartaches

== Transportation ==
- Union Pacific North Line (UP North), a commuter rail line in the Chicago area

== See also ==
- Upstate (disambiguation)
