= Laminacauda =

Scientific classification
- Kingdom: Animalia
- Phylum: Arthropoda
- Subphylum: Chelicerata
- Class: Arachnida
- Order: Araneae
- Infraorder: Araneomorphae
- Family: Linyphiidae
- Genus: Laminacauda; Millidge, 1985

Type species
- L. diffusa Millidge, 1985

Species
- 40, see text

Genus of spiders

Laminacauda is a genus of dwarf spiders that was first described by Alfred Frank Millidge in 1985.

== Species ==
As of May 2021 it contains forty species, found in Argentina, Bolivia, Brazil, Chile, Colombia, Ecuador, Panama, Peru, and Uruguay:

- Laminacauda aluminensis Millidge, 1991 – Argentina
- Laminacauda amabilis (Keyserling, 1886) – Peru
- Laminacauda ansoni Millidge, 1991 – Chile (Juan Fernandez Is.)
- Laminacauda argentinensis Millidge, 1985 – Argentina
- Laminacauda baerti Miller, 2007 – Panama, Colombia, Galapagos Is.
- Laminacauda boliviensis Millidge, 1985 – Bolivia
- Laminacauda cognata Millidge, 1991 – Chile (Juan Fernandez Is.)
- Laminacauda dentichelis (Berland, 1913) – Ecuador
- Laminacauda diffusa Millidge, 1985 (type) – Chile, Argentina, Falkland Is.
- Laminacauda dysphorica (Keyserling, 1886) – Peru, Bolivia
- Laminacauda expers Millidge, 1991 – Peru
- Laminacauda fuegiana (Tullgren, 1901) – Chile, Falkland Is.
- Laminacauda gigas Millidge, 1991 – Chile (Juan Fernandez Is.)
- Laminacauda grata Millidge, 1991 – Colombia
- Laminacauda insulana Millidge, 1985 – Tristan da Cunha
- Laminacauda luscinia Millidge, 1985 – Tristan da Cunha
- Laminacauda magna Millidge, 1991 – Chile (Juan Fernandez Is.)
- Laminacauda malkini Millidge, 1991 – Chile (Juan Fernandez Is.)
- Laminacauda maxima Millidge, 1985 – Tristan da Cunha
- Laminacauda montevidensis (Keyserling, 1878) – Brazil, Uruguay, Argentina
- Laminacauda monticola Millidge, 1985 – Bolivia
- Laminacauda nana Millidge, 1991 – Chile
- Laminacauda newtoni Millidge, 1985 – Chile, Argentina
- Laminacauda orina (Chamberlin, 1916) – Peru
- Laminacauda pacifica (Berland, 1924) – Chile (Juan Fernandez Is.)
- Laminacauda parvipalpis Millidge, 1985 – Chile
- Laminacauda peruensis Millidge, 1985 – Peru
- Laminacauda plagiata (Tullgren, 1901) – Chile, Argentina, Falkland Is.
- Laminacauda propinqua Millidge, 1991 – Chile (Juan Fernandez Is.)
- Laminacauda rubens Millidge, 1991 – Chile (Juan Fernandez Is.)
- Laminacauda sacra Millidge, 1991 – Bolivia
- Laminacauda salsa Millidge, 1991 – Chile
- Laminacauda suavis Millidge, 1991 – Colombia
- Laminacauda sublimis Millidge, 1991 – Peru
- Laminacauda thayerae Millidge, 1985 – Chile
- Laminacauda tristani Millidge, 1985 – Tristan da Cunha
- Laminacauda tuberosa Millidge, 1991 – Chile (Juan Fernandez Is.)
- Laminacauda tucumani Millidge, 1991 – Argentina
- Laminacauda vicana (Keyserling, 1886) – Peru
- Laminacauda villagra Millidge, 1991 – Chile (Juan Fernandez Is.)
