= Southdown =

Southdown may refer to:

- Southdown sheep, a breed of sheep
- Southdown, Cornwall, England
- Southdown, a suburb of Harpenden, Hertfordshire, England
- Southdown, New Zealand, a suburb of Auckland
- Southdown Motor Services, a former bus company based in Sussex, England
- Southdown Power Station, a power station in Auckland
- Southdown, a cement company acquired by Cemex

== See also ==
- South Downs, England
- South Down (disambiguation)
- Down south (disambiguation)
- HMS Southdown
