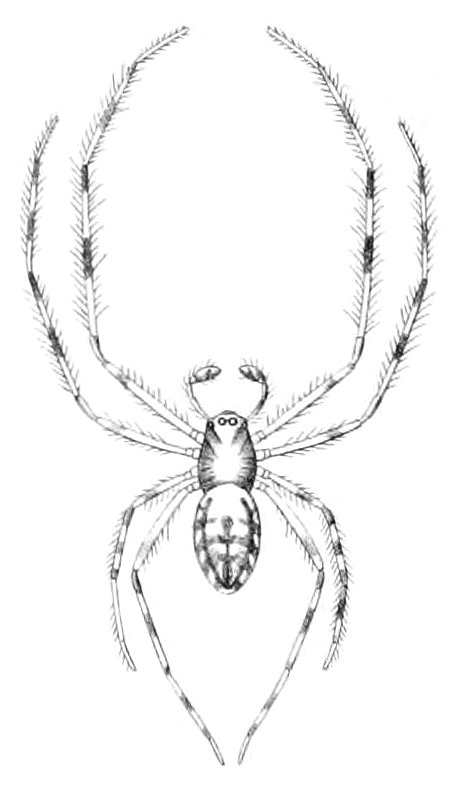

Scientific classification
- Kingdom: Animalia
- Phylum: Arthropoda
- Subphylum: Chelicerata
- Class: Arachnida
- Order: Araneae
- Infraorder: Araneomorphae
- Family: Linyphiidae
- Genus: Orsonwelles
- Species: O. graphicus

Binomial name
- Orsonwelles graphicus (Simon, 1900)
- Range in the Hawaiian Islands

Synonyms
- Labulla graphica Simon, 1900

= Orsonwelles graphicus =

Species of spider

Orsonwelles graphicus is a species of linyphiid spider endemic to the Big Island of Hawaii. It was described in 1900 by the French naturalist Eugène Simon.
