= Laminacauda montevidensis =

Scientific classification
- Domain: Eukaryota
- Kingdom: Animalia
- Phylum: Arthropoda
- Subphylum: Chelicerata
- Class: Arachnida
- Order: Araneae
- Infraorder: Araneomorphae
- Family: Linyphiidae
- Genus: Laminacauda
- Species: L. montevidensis

Binomial name
- Laminacauda montevidensis (Keyserling, 1878)

Species of spider

Laminacauda montevidensis is a species of sheet weaver found in Argentina, Brazil and Uruguay. It was described by Keyserling in 1878.
