= Laminacauda orina =

Scientific classification
- Kingdom: Animalia
- Phylum: Arthropoda
- Subphylum: Chelicerata
- Class: Arachnida
- Order: Araneae
- Infraorder: Araneomorphae
- Family: Linyphiidae
- Genus: Laminacauda
- Species: L. orina

Binomial name
- Laminacauda orina (Chamberlin, 1916)

Species of spider

Laminacauda orina is a species of sheet weaver found in Peru. It was described by Chamberlin in 1916.
