= Laminacauda fuegiana =

Scientific classification
- Domain: Eukaryota
- Kingdom: Animalia
- Phylum: Arthropoda
- Subphylum: Chelicerata
- Class: Arachnida
- Order: Araneae
- Infraorder: Araneomorphae
- Family: Linyphiidae
- Genus: Laminacauda
- Species: L. fuegiana

Binomial name
- Laminacauda fuegiana (Tullgren, 1901)

Species of spider

Laminacauda fuegiana is a species of sheet weaver found in Chile and the Falkland Islands. It was described by Tullgren in 1901.
