= Laminacauda pacifica =

Scientific classification
- Domain: Eukaryota
- Kingdom: Animalia
- Phylum: Arthropoda
- Subphylum: Chelicerata
- Class: Arachnida
- Order: Araneae
- Infraorder: Araneomorphae
- Family: Linyphiidae
- Genus: Laminacauda
- Species: L. pacifica

Binomial name
- Laminacauda pacifica (Berland, 1924)

Species of spider

Laminacauda pacifica is a species of sheet weaver found in the Juan Fernandez Islands. It was described by Berland in 1924.
