= Laminacauda baerti =

Scientific classification
- Domain: Eukaryota
- Kingdom: Animalia
- Phylum: Arthropoda
- Subphylum: Chelicerata
- Class: Arachnida
- Order: Araneae
- Infraorder: Araneomorphae
- Family: Linyphiidae
- Genus: Laminacauda
- Species: L. baerti

Binomial name
- Laminacauda baerti Miller, 2007

Species of spider

Laminacauda baerti is a species of sheet weaver found in Colombia, Panama, and the Galapagos Islands. It was described by Miller in 2007.
