= Laminacauda dentichelis =

Scientific classification
- Kingdom: Animalia
- Phylum: Arthropoda
- Subphylum: Chelicerata
- Class: Arachnida
- Order: Araneae
- Infraorder: Araneomorphae
- Family: Linyphiidae
- Genus: Laminacauda
- Species: L. dentichelis

Binomial name
- Laminacauda dentichelis (Berland, 1913)

Species of spider

Laminacauda dentichelis is a species of sheet weaver found in Ecuador. It was described by Berland in 1913.
