= Predatoroonops =

Scientific classification
- Kingdom: Animalia
- Phylum: Arthropoda
- Subphylum: Chelicerata
- Class: Arachnida
- Order: Araneae
- Infraorder: Araneomorphae
- Family: Oonopidae
- Genus: Predatoroonops; Brescovit, Rheims & Ott in Brescovit, Bonaldo, Santos, Ott & Rheims, 2012

Species
- See text

Genus of arachnids (goblin spiders)

Predatoroonops is a genus of goblin spiders endemic to the Brazilian Atlantic Forest. The genus is characterized by the extremely modified male chelicerae and long pairs of ventral spines. It is the first fully revised endemic Brazilian genus of spiders, uncovered in 2012 after two and a half years of research at São Paulo's Instituto Butantan.

The generic name is in honor of the Predator from the eponymous 1987 film, as the researchers found the spiders' chelicerae similar to the creature's unmasked face. All the specific names of the genus reference the film's cast, crew or fictional elements.

== Discovery ==
Predatoroonops was first published in the Bulletin of the American Museum of Natural History in June 2012. The genus is composed of seventeen new species. They are unique for the peculiar morphology of the male chelicerae and the lateral anterior borders of the carapace.

Members of the genus (all of which are endemic to Brazil) were discovered by a team of Brazilian scientists as part of the Planetary Biodiversity Inventory (PBI) project on the goblin spider family (Oonopidae). The team consisted of Alexandre B. Bonaldo, Adalberto J. Santos, Ricardo Ott, and Cristina A. Rheims. It was led by the arachnologist Antonio Domingos Brescovit of Instituto Butantan, who has been studying spiders in the Brazilian Atlantic Forest since 2006. According to Brescovit, the research took two and a half years. Publication was delayed because of the 2010 fire at the Instituto Butantan which destroyed a major part of the institute's specimen collections.

== Physiology ==
Members of Predatoroonops are small, ranging from 1.8 to 2.1 mm (0.071 to 0.083 in) in size. They are distinguished by the projected and articulated chelicerae of the males, the conspicuous posterior receptacle of the genitalia of the females, and the spines with pronounced bases on the legs of both sexes. They are usually found in the plant litter on the forest floor. Information on diet and behavior is currently unknown, however, given that all the research was done with dead specimens.

== Taxonomy ==
Predatoroonops schwarzeneggeri, sp. nov., is the type species of the genus. The generic name is a contraction of "Predator Oonops", in reference to the creature of the 1987 film Predator, as the scientists found the distinguished male chelicerae similar to the Predator's unmasked face. The specific names honor the film's cast, crew and elements. For instance, actor Arnold Schwarzenegger, who played protagonist 'Dutch' Schaeffer, was homaged with both Predatoroonops schwarzeneggeri and Predatoroonops dutch.

Two species groups within Predatoroonops were proposed, based on the presence or absence of a median furrow in the frontal median area of the male chelicerae. The schwarzeneggeri group presents both median and subdistal furrows, and a long lateral sclerotized groove at the anterior lateral border of the carapace in males; the peterhalli group lacks the median and distal furrows, and its species have the anterior lateral border of the carapace with an attenuated groove. The closest relatives of Predatoroonops are in the genera Orchestina and Cavisternum.

=== Species ===
Species of Predatoroonops
Species	Author	Distribution	Etymology
Group schwarzeneggeri
P. anna	Brescovit, Rheims & Bonaldo	Bahia	Anna Gonsalves, a guerrilla played by Elpidia Carrillo
P. billy	Brescovit, Rheims & Ott	Rio de Janeiro	Sgt. Billy Sole, played by Sonny Landham
P. blain	Brescovit, Rheims & Ott	Bahia	Sgt. Blain Cooper, played by Jesse Ventura
P. dillon	Brescovit, Rheims & Bonaldo	Alagoas	Capt. George Dillon, played by Carl Weathers
P. dutch	Brescovit, Rheims & Bonaldo	Bahia	Major 'Dutch' Schaeffer, the film's protagonist, played by Arnold Schwarzenegger
P. maceliot	Brescovit, Rheims & Ott	São Paulo	Sgt. 'Mac' Elliot, played by Bill Duke
P. poncho	Brescovit, Rheims & Ott	Rio de Janeiro	Lt. 'Poncho' Ramirez, played by Richard Chaves
P. rickhawkins	Brescovit, Rheims & Bonaldo	Espírito Santo	Sgt. Richard Hawkins, played by Shane Black
P. schwarzeneggeri	Brescovit, Rheims & Ott	Rio de Janeiro	Arnold Schwarzenegger, the lead actor from Predator
P. vallarta	Brescovit, Rheims & Bonaldo, 2012	Rio de Janeiro	Puerto Vallarta, Mexico, one of the filming locations for Predator
P. valverde	Brescovit, Rheims & Ott, 2012	Rio de Janeiro	Val Verde, the fictional country where Predator takes place
Group peterhalli
P. chicano	Brescovit, Rheims & Santos	Espírito Santo	An alternate nickname for Poncho given his Mexican-American origin
P. mctiernani	Brescovit, Rheims & Santos	São Paulo, Rio de Janeiro, Santa Catarina	John McTiernan, director of Predator
P. olddemon	Brescovit, Rheims & Santos	Rio de Janeiro	Anna says the Predator was referred in her village as a "demon who makes trophies of men"
P. peterhalli	Brescovit, Rheims & Santos	São Paulo	Kevin Peter Hall (1955–1991), the actor who played the Predator
P. phillips	Brescovit, Rheims & Santos	Bahia	General Homer Phillips, played by R.G. Armstrong
P. yautja	Brescovit, Rheims & Santos	Minas Gerais	The name used for the Predator species in the expanded universe
