= Laminacauda gigas =

Scientific classification
- Domain: Eukaryota
- Kingdom: Animalia
- Phylum: Arthropoda
- Subphylum: Chelicerata
- Class: Arachnida
- Order: Araneae
- Infraorder: Araneomorphae
- Family: Linyphiidae
- Genus: Laminacauda
- Species: L. gigas

Binomial name
- Laminacauda gigas Millidge, 1991

Species of spider

Laminacauda gigas is a species of sheet weaver found in the Juan Fernández Islands. It was described by Millidge in 1991.
