= Val Verde (fictional country) =

Fictional country used by Steven E. de Souza

Val Verde is a fictional country or city used by Hollywood writer and producer Steven E. de Souza when his stories require a South or Central American locale that will not cause legal or diplomatic problems. The location first appeared in his 1985 film Commando.

The name translates as "Green Valley" in multiple Romance languages, such as Portuguese, Italian, and Spanish.

== Appearances ==
Val Verde has appeared in a number of films, television programs, and comics by de Souza:

- Commando (1985): the exiled dictator Arius (Dan Hedaya) of Val Verde blackmails John Matrix (Arnold Schwarzenegger) into assassinating the current president. The country is an 11-hour flight from Los Angeles, placing it approximately 5,500 miles (8,900 km) from California.
- Supercarrier (1988): in the episode "Rest and Revolution", the USS Georgetown docks in Val Verde just as civil war breaks out.
- Die Hard 2 (1990): the former dictator of Val Verde, general Ramon Esperanza (Franco Nero), is being extradited to the United States.
- Adventure Inc. (2003): the episode "Plague Ship of Val Verde" concerned an outbreak of a highly-communicable disease on an island off Val Verde.
- Sheena (2007–2023): Devil's Due Publishing's contemporary reboot of the classic 1940s comic moved the setting from Africa to Val Verde.

There have also been appearances outside of de Souza's own work, linked either by shared personnel or by a direct reference. For example:

- Neither of the two countries in which Predator (1987) is set is named on-screen, but de Souza believes that the bulk of the movie takes place in Val Verde. Predator, like Commando, was produced by Joel Silver and starred Arnold Schwarzenegger. However, in Predators (2010), Isabelle (Alice Braga) states that the events of the original film took place in Guatemala, though part of the film's first act takes place in another unnamed country. The Predator novelization by Paul Monette also places the events in Guatemala, while the unnamed country of the first act is given the name "Conta Mana." Mark Verheiden's Predator comics for Dark Horse specify that the original movie took place in Colombia.
- In the 2020 video game Predator: Hunting Grounds, the events of the film are explicitly said to have taken place "over the border" in Val Verde, including in DLC audio logs voiced by Arnold Schwarzenegger.
- Broforce, a 2015 video game, which has characters that parody action heroes like John Matrix from Commando (as well as Dirty Harry, John Rambo, etc.), uses Val Verde as one of its settings.
- One of the desert courses in the 2017 racing game FlatOut 4: Total Insanity is named Val Verde.
- Val Verde appears in the anime Symphogear (2012). It is part of the backstory of Chris Yukine, where she lost her parents to war and was captured and enslaved for six years, before being rescued by the United Nations. The fourth season, Symphogear AXZ (2017), features the main characters visiting Val Verde as a key part of the season's plot arc, where Chris recalls her past.
- The film Jurassic Attack (2013) takes place entirely in Val Verde.
- Val Verde appears in the horror film The Theta Girl (2017). In a flashback sequence, the Papa Shogun character recalls discovering a hallucinogenic compound in the slime of an indigenous ground toad found in "this shit-hole country of Val Verde."
- Val Verde appears in the TV show NCIS ("Rendezvous", Season 14, Episode 24, 2017) as a remote part of Paraguay.
- Val Verde is one of the settings of the 2018 film Commando Ninja.
- Part of Hank Green's 2020 novel A Beautifully Foolish Endeavor is set in Val Verde.
- The podcast Action Boyz, a comedy podcast that focuses on action movies and stars Jon Gabrus, Ben Rodgers, and Ryan Stanger, refers to their studio as Val Verde.
- In Contra: Operation Galuga, when encountering Beowulf at the ruins, Beowulf tells the team that they had met once before, at Val Verde.
- The game Breezer takes place in Val Verde, with 'Land For Sale' signs branded as 'Val Verde Estates'.
- In the free and open-source kart racing video game SuperTuxKart, Val Verde is a country in a jungle similar to the Amazon.

== Origin ==
Steven de Souza explained his reason for using Val Verde in his Sheena comic:

It's something like Guyana, a country which encompasses lush Caribbean resorts popular with tourists, an unexplored mysterious rainforest, and a mix of Anglo, Spanish, African, Creole and indigenous cultures. This is a country of the imagination I've used in several films and TV programs, which I thought was my little inside baseball joke, but Eric Lichtenfield, the author of 'Actions Speak Louder,' recently sent me a Wikipedia page on it! Seriously, my Dad's family is from that part of the world and it's something I can write about with some familiarity.

== Portrayal ==
Val Verde has principally been used as a plot device or location in place of real Latin American countries in action and adventure movies, as a particular result of the United States' rocky relations with many nations in the region during the 1980s.

When glimpsed in Commando, it appears to be a poor nation, where subsistence agriculture (i.e., livestock) is side-by-side with military propaganda and constant military presence. Inhabitants appear poor but happy, and there is evidence of a trade embargo reminiscent of that placed on Cuba in the presence of battered but functional vintage 1950s cars.

== Locations ==
As well as studio shots, other locations have been used to portray Val Verde on film:

- The entrance to Long Beach Airport's passenger terminal was used for Val Verde's main airport in Commando.
- San Pedro, California, was used for the port of Val Verde on Supercarrier, while Valencia, California, stood in for the countryside.
- Puerto Vallarta was used as the principal filming location for Predator, despite the objections of John McTiernan and Donald McAlpine. The early beach shots were taken at Puerto Vallarta and jungle scenes were shot slightly further inland. When more money was released by Fox, McTiernan was able to shoot in his preferred location around Palenque (including the Misol-Ha waterfall) and about half of the final film came from this round of shooting.

== Legacy ==
The spider genus Predatoroonops, named after the spiders' similarity to the Predator himself, has a species named Predatoroonops valverde.

== See also ==
- List of fictional countries
- Banana republic
- 555 (telephone number)
- Oceanic Airlines
