= Seamless branching =

Space-saving mechanism on video discs

Seamless branching is a space-saving mechanism used on Blu-ray Discs and, rarely, DVDs, to allow multiple versions of a film to be stored on a disc without storing redundant scenes multiple times.

One example is the Signature Edition DVD of The Iron Giant, where the user can select between the original theatrical version and an extended version. The two versions differ only in a few scenes. The DVD player is instructed to play the film normally except for these scenes, then jump to the appropriate scene as selected by the user before the commencement of the film, and then jump back to play the rest of the film. The disc is authored in a way which allows the joins to be invisible, hence the term seamless (an example of a non-seamless branched title is the Platinum Edition DVD of The Lion King). Larger scale examples of the same technique are seen in the 2000 Ultimate Edition DVD of Terminator 2: Judgment Day, the 2007 DVD rerelease of Blade Runner, the Platinum and Diamond Edition DVDs of Beauty and the Beast, and the 4K Ultra HD version of Conan the Barbarian, in which three different cuts of the films are playable from the same discs.

Another possible use of seamless branching is for the localisation (translation) of on-screen visible text. The Star Wars DVDs with their opening crawl are a prime example. Normally, only the audio track of films is translated into other languages, but when text central to the plot is visible on-screen, the scene may be created once for every language, and the DVD player can be instructed to select the appropriate version of the scene depending on the user's language preference. However, for this purpose a technique called multi-angle is used more often.

== See also ==
- DVD
