= Upstate California =

2001 marketing campaign

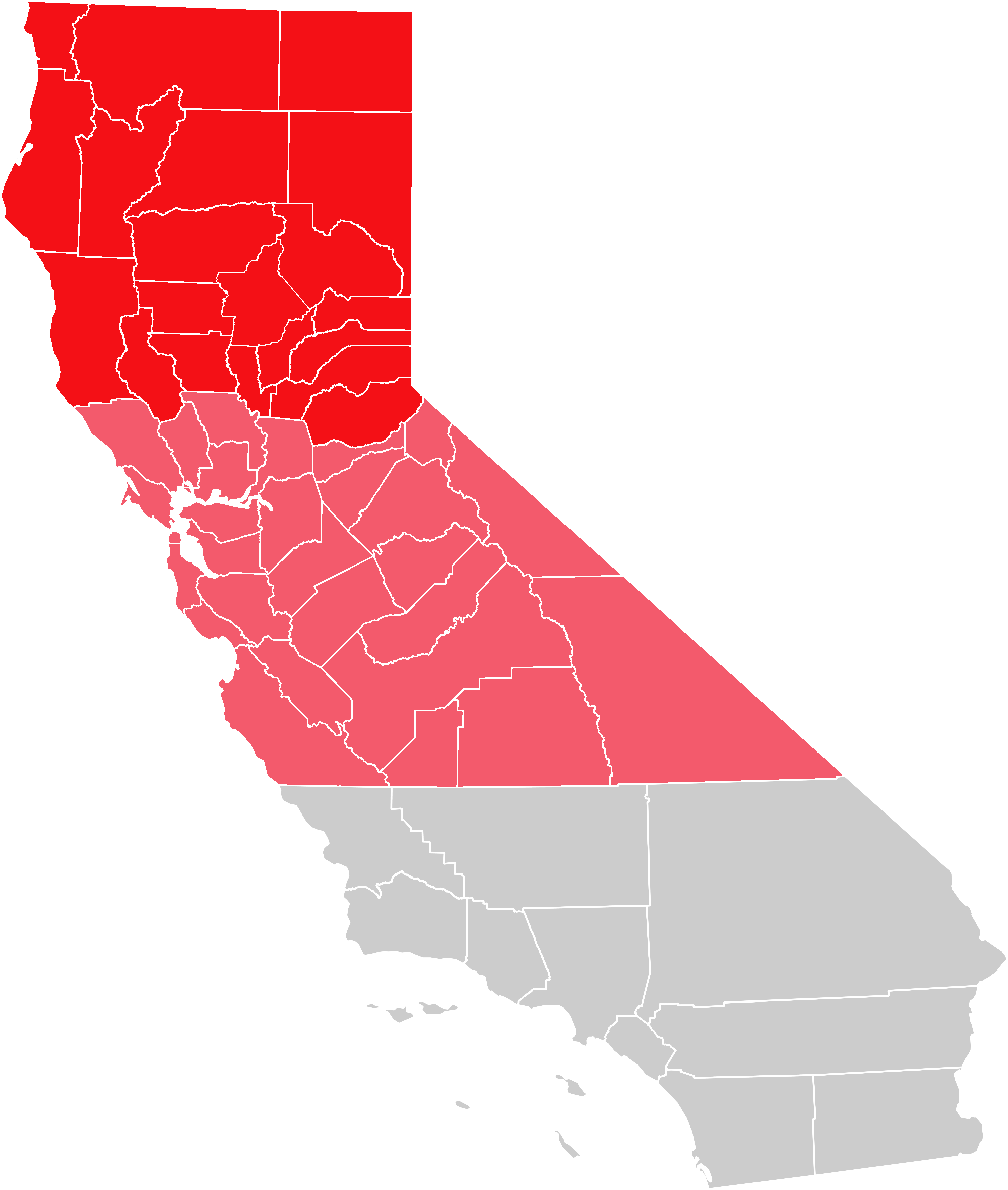
Map of California with "Upstate California" shown in dark red. Northern California includes both the red and the light red counties.

Upstate California is the name of a marketing campaign which seeks to promote business in the northernmost 20 counties of California. Roughly the upper half of Northern California, the "upstate" designation encompasses primarily rural areas which contain 4.5% of California's population. Outside of public relations, this area is often referred to as far Northern California.

== Context ==
The northernmost counties of California have had longstanding concerns about representation in California's government. Partition and secessionist movements have occasionally arisen in the region, often packaged with proposals to split California into multiple states. A 1941 movement to combine the northernmost counties of California and southernmost counties of Oregon into the State of Jefferson fell apart, as it was announced the day before the December 7 attack on Pearl Harbor which led to the US entry into World War II. In the early 1990s, California State Assemblyman Stan Statham led an unsuccessful effort to split the northern counties into a new state.

== Marketing ==
The term "Upstate California" was coined by Robert Berry, a marketing development specialist hired by a group of the northernmost counties of California. The name "Upstate California" was intended to draw upon the popular recognition of Upstate New York as a distinct region. The Upstate California campaign did not want to partition California to create a separate state or geopolitical entity. Instead the group wanted to encourage business investment in California's sparsely populated northernmost counties which were felt to be too often ignored within the Northern California designation—the population centers of the San Francisco Bay Area and the Sacramento metropolitan area received the most attention. The Upstate California promotional campaign officially began on September 10, 2001.

== Counties ==
- Butte
- Colusa
- Del Norte
- El Dorado
- Glenn
- Humboldt
- Lake
- Lassen
- Mendocino
- Modoc
- Nevada
- Placer
- Plumas
- Shasta
- Sierra
- Siskiyou
- Sutter
- Tehama
- Trinity
- Yuba
