= Down south =

Down South may refer to:

- Down South (film), a 1931 Toby the Pup cartoon
- Down South (album) or the title song, by Doc Watson, 1984
- Down South, an album by Rhett Akins, 2008
- "Down South", a song by Paul McCartney from The Boys of Dungeon Lane, 2026
- "Down South", a song by Tom Petty from Highway Companion, 2006

== See also ==
- Southdown (disambiguation)
- South Down (disambiguation)
- South (disambiguation)
