= List of Garfield characters =

List of characters in the Garfield strip

This is a list of characters in the Garfield comic strip, created by Jim Davis, organized by category and date of first appearance.

== Main characters ==
=== Garfield ===
First appearance: June 19, 1978

Garfield is the strip's title character and main protagonist. He is Jon's fat orange tabby cat. Some of his personality traits include laziness, cynicism, sarcasm, a hatred of Mondays, a tendency to be annoyed by Jon's dog Odie, an active imagination, a love for lasagna, and a hatred for Nermal. Despite his lazy, sarcastic and arrogant demeanor, he does possess a kind heart, though he very rarely shows it for fearing of coming off as "soft".

In February 2017, a dispute arose regarding Garfield's gender, owing to comments that the character's creator, Jim Davis, made in 2014. He said then, "Garfield is very universal. By virtue of being a cat, really, he's not really male or female or any particular race or nationality, young or old. It gives me a lot more latitude for the humour for the situations." Davis later clarified, however, that "Garfield is male".

=== Jon Arbuckle ===
First appearance: June 19, 1978

Jon Arbuckle is Garfield and Odie's dorky owner. He is shown as very clumsy and unintelligent, often getting himself hurt or getting injured by Garfield.

=== Lyman ===
First appearance: August 7, 1978

Last appearance: April 24, 1983

Cameos:

- Cameo in the tenth anniversary strip: June 19, 1988
- Cameo in a newspaper: April 2, 2013 and June 23, 2024

Lyman is Jon's former roommate and Odie's former owner. He was a main character along with Jon, Odie, and Garfield during the strip's early years. He was one of Jon's best friends from high school and was taken in by Jon when he needed a place to stay. Lyman, not aiming to trouble Jon too much, brought two things with him: a suitcase and Odie, much to Garfield's dismay. However, after the first few years of the strip, Lyman was gradually phased out of the main cast, mainly due to his role as the person that Jon would talk to being taken over by Garfield and Odie before disappearing from the strip entirely, at which point Odie's ownership was quietly transferred to Jon. His last regular appearance was in 1983 and he made a final cameo in the tenth-anniversary strip. Lyman's fate was left ambiguous by Jim Davis, who offered a variety of often humorous explanations for Lyman's disappearance over the years.

Lyman would eventually reappear in the online games Garfield's Scary Scavenger Hunt and Garfield's Scary Scavenger Hunt 2: Donuts of Doom in the early 2000s. In 2012, Lyman appeared in the The Garfield Show episode "Long Lost Lyman" (season 3) where he is portrayed as a wildlife photographer who left Jon and his home to go to a country called Franistan. The "Long Lost Lyman" version of Lyman has round eyes resembling Jon's, rather than the dot-eyes of his traditional comics design, and is voiced by Frank Ferrante.

=== Odie ===
First appearance: August 8, 1978

Odie is a yellow-furred, brown-eared dog described by Garfield to be a "purebred clown" and possibly a dachshund in the live-action movies that resides with Jon and Garfield and is, at times, Garfield's best friend. The name came from a commercial written by Davis, which featured Odie the Village Idiot. Davis liked the name and reused it. His birthday is August 8, likely as a nod to his debut date. Odie's main characteristic is his general "lack of intelligence and naiveté", which allows for Garfield to triumph over him in their prankings. However, this trait has been downplayed in recent years, particularly in The Garfield Movie, in which he is depicted as just as intelligent as Garfield. In "one glimpse at Odie's secret life", the dog is shown to be much more sophisticated when alone, and Davis lets "Odie get Garfield back every few months". While Garfield's "playful mistreatment" of Odie is a persistent element of the comic, some strips make it clear that "deep down he knows he loves the little scamp". Odie has been considered a "much-loved", "lovable and adorable" and "fan-favourite" character. Jessica Jalali from Screen Rant saw in Odie and Garfield "an iconic duo that made it hard to separate one from the other". Librarian and cartoonist Katy Kavanagh saw Odie as "the comic relief" used to create humor in opposition to Garfield, who is "represented as the curmudgeon".

In most of his animated appearances, he is voiced by Gregg Berger. In The Garfield Movie, he is voiced by Harvey Guillén. In the 2026 animated series, he is voiced by series executive producer Dave H. Johnson.

=== Pooky ===
First appearance: October 23, 1978

Pooky is Garfield's teddy bear that was found in a drawer by Garfield. Garfield often carries Pooky around and makes him interact with Jon.

=== Dr. Liz Wilson ===
First appearance: June 26, 1979

A veterinarian, Liz is Jon Arbuckle's love interest. Jon has attempted to ask her out on dates numerous times over the years, but rarely succeeded. When she did accept, the outings normally became disastrous (commonly because of Garfield coming on the date or Jon doing something embarrassing). Eventually in 2006 whilst on a date with an amnesiac Ellen, he discovers that Liz is at the same restaurant dating someone else. After an awkward encounter with each other, Liz finally admitted that she had feelings for Jon. The two have been portrayed as a couple since, though Jon's trademark geekiness continues to both amuse and embarrass Liz.

On Garfield and Friends, Dr. Liz Wilson was voiced by Julie Payne, occasionally appearing in the first two seasons and once in the fourth season. In the live-action/animated movies, she is played by Jennifer Love Hewitt. Her first, albeit brief, television appearance was on the second TV special, Garfield on the Town.

In The Garfield Show, she is once again voiced by Julie Payne. In The Garfield Movie, she is voiced by Dev Joshi.

=== Nermal ===
First appearance: September 3, 1979

Nermal is a grey tabby cat who is smaller than most and prefers to call himself "the world's cutest kitten" and the main antagonist of the franchise (though he isn't really evil) as well as Garfield's arch-rival. Nermal was first introduced as Jon's parents' kitten. A recurring theme is Nermal's persistent annoyance at Garfield, which usually results in Garfield retaliating, mostly by physical assault, including strangulation, severe beating, throwing through the door, and, as a running gag, mailing Nermal to Abu Dhabi, which he has done over 74 times.

In Garfield and Friends, he is played by Desirée Goyette. In Garfield: The Movie, Nermal is portrayed as a Siamese cat in the neighborhood, and is voiced by David Eigenberg. Nermal is voiced by Jason Marsden in The Garfield Show, as well as in the films Garfield Gets Real, Garfield's Fun Fest, and Garfield's Pet Force.

=== Arlene ===
First appearance: December 17, 1980

Arlene is a female pink-furred cat with thick eyelashes, large lips, and a gap between her two front teeth (a short-haired pinkish white Turkish Angora in the comics and most animated media and a Russian Blue cat in the live-action movies). She is Garfield's main love interest and his official girlfriend since 1980. (Jim Davis confirmed in February 2017 that the two were in an official relationship).

In Garfield: The Movie, she appears as a Russian Blue cat, voiced by Debra Messing. In Garfield Gets Real, Garfield's Fun Fest, Garfield's Pet Force, and The Garfield Show, she is played by Audrey Wasilewski.

=== Squeak ===
First appearance: October 30, 1984

Squeak is one of the many mice who live in Jon, Garfield, and Odie's house. He and the rest of the mice in Jon's house are close friends of Garfield's, with Garfield even being the one to give Squeak his name. Garfield and the mice often assist each other with their problems, Garfield often keeping them safe from Jon and other cats and the mice often helping Garfield's various schemes.

Squeak is replaced as Garfield's main mouse friend on Garfield and Friends, by a mouse named Floyd (voiced by Gregg Berger) and in the 2004 film by a mouse named Louis (voiced by Nick Cannon). Squeak appears fully in The Garfield Show, voiced by Berger.

== Arbuckle family ==
=== Mom ===
First appearance: February 13, 1980

Jon's unnamed mother who runs the Arbuckle farm with Jon's father. She is based on Jim Davis' own mother. She most commonly appears when Jon, Garfield, and Odie visit Jon's childhood home/the Arbuckle family's farm. In both A Garfield Christmas and The Garfield Show, she is voiced by Julie Payne.

=== Dad ===
First appearance: February 13, 1980

Jon's unnamed father who runs the Arbuckle farm with Jon's mother. He is based on Jim Davis' own father. In A Garfield Christmas, he is voiced by Pat Harrington Jr. and in The Garfield Show, he is voiced by Frank Welker. He most commonly appears when Jon, Garfield, and Odie visit Jon's childhood home/the Arbuckle family's farm.

=== Aunt Gussie ===
First appearance: August 14, 1981

Aunt Gussie was a relative of Jon's who he and Garfield would occasionally visit. Although portrayed as a stereotypical old woman, Gussie often indicates that she lives a less-than-reserved lifestyle, such as teaching slamdancing for extra money. She is often mean towards Garfield, at which Garfield comments that Gussie used to double-date with Lizzie Borden. Gussie also harbors a crush on John Travolta.

=== Grandma Arbuckle ===
First appearance: January 25, 1982

Jon's grandmother appears in Garfield's Thanksgiving and A Garfield Christmas, in which she is voiced by Pat Carroll.

=== Doc Boy ===
First appearance: May 17, 1983

Doc "Doc Boy" Arbuckle is Jon's younger brother (and only known sibling). He is named after and based on Jim Davis' own younger brother Dave "Doc Boy" Davis. In his first appearance, his mother mentions that Doc Boy recently moved back in with his parents and works on the farm as a hired hand. In The Garfield Show, Doc Boy is shown to have moved out and now has his own farm, with a comic appearance in 2022 implying that he still now lives alone (Doc Boy appears in a video call with Jon, Odie, Garfield, Liz, Arlene, & Nermal, and his and Jon's parents on his own camera, implying he no longer lives with his parents as they appear on a separate webcam). He also starts dating another woman named Gloria.

In both A Garfield Christmas and The Garfield Show, he is voiced by David Lander.

=== Drusilla and Minerva ===
Jon's nieces Drusilla and Minerva only appear in The Garfield Show and some Garfield comic books (e.g., Garfield: Snack Pack). Their only distinctive catchphrases are "We want to play with the kitty cat!" and "We want to play with the puppy dog!" They always want to dress Garfield and Odie up and frankly Garfield and Odie find them as an annoyance.

=== Long Jon Arbuckle ===
Jon Arbuckle's pirate ancestor mentioned in Garfield and Friends, and also the owner of Garfield's ancestor, Orange Beard. He was believed by villagers to have stolen George Washington's maps, while actually he was just safeguarding them. General Washington gives him a letter of commendation to prove his loyalty. He entrusts this letter to Orange Beard.

== Garfield's family ==
=== Garfield's Mother ===
First appearance: December 11, 1984

The mother of Garfield, and Arlene's mother-in-law who first appeared in the animated specials Garfield on the Town and Garfield: His 9 Lives. She has since made several cameos in the comic strip, including a December 1984 story that is a loose adaptation of Garfield on the Town. She also appeared once on Garfield and Friends, in an episode called "The Garfield Rap". Sandi Huge provided her voice in the specials.

=== Vic ===
Victor "Vic" is the father of Garfield, and Arlene's father-in-law, who was introduced in The Garfield Movie. Unlike his son, Vic is more of an outdoor cat who is very adventurous, with his voice provided by Samuel L. Jackson.

=== Garfield's Grandfather ===
First appearance: November 10, 1980

Garfield's grandpa first appeared in the strip on November 10, 1980.

In Garfield on the Town, a different-looking, rougher maternal grandfather is seen living with his son. Whether the comic strip's version is Garfield's paternal grandfather has not been explicitly clarified.

=== Ràoul ===
Ràoul (voiced by George Wendt) is Garfield's full brother, and the other known child of Vic and Garfield's Mother (whether they had any more children remains unknown), and only appears in the special Garfield on the Town. He looks a lot like Guido (see below for one-time characters).

=== Arno, Barney / Bernice, Berle, Bernie, Bob, Ed, Edna, Evelyn, Harry, Hubert, Nick, Patrick, Reba, Roy ===
These are all of Garfield's aunts and uncles on his mother's side.

=== Buchanan Feline ===
Garfield's grandfather's brother was the first cat on the moon and is featured in a flashback Garfield and Friends episode, called "Astro Cat".

=== Oslo Feline ===
First mentioned: January 30, 1994

Garfield mentions that his great-grandfather is named Oslo. In the comic, Garfield says Oslo was a pioneer, but crazy. He moved his family thousands of miles across uncharted territory because he thinks he hears a can opener.

=== Orange Beard ===
Orange Beard the Pirate Captain is an ancestor of Garfield's mentioned in a Garfield and Friends episode. He is the cat of Long Jon, a relative of Jon's.

=== Don Pedro Garfield ===
First appearance: Garfield Discovers America, published January 1, 1994

In the book "Garfield Discovers America", Garfield's ancestor Don Pedro Garfield serves as Christopher Columbus' cat on board the Niña, Pinta, and Santa Maria. While on board, he, and not Christopher Columbus, discovers the New World.

=== Rolo Polo ===
First appearance: August 9, 1979

Rolo Polo was an ancestor of Garfield's who was set to go sailing with Marco Polo. He didn't end up going to the Orient because motels wouldn't accept pets then.

=== "Long-tooth Cave Cat" ===
Garfield's Stone Age relative mentioned in Garfield: His 9 Lives is the Cave Cat with sabertooth tiger-like long teeth. His girlfriend was a Stone Age member of Arlene's family, named Girl Cat.

=== Org ===
First appearance: August 7, 1979

Org is a possible ancestor of Garfield who is the first cat to be adopted. Either he or the family dog ate Chuck, Org's owner.

== Odie's family ==
=== Big Bob ===
While most of Odie's ancestry, including his parents, is unknown, in Garfield: His 9 Lives, Cave Cat Garfield, a Stone Age ancestor of Garfield is friends with Big Bob, the Stone Age ancestor of Odie.

=== Bonzo Wag ===
First appearance: September 2, 1980

Bonzo Wag was a late Stone Age ancestor of Odie (a descendent of Big Bob) who realized that wagging his tail endeared him to humans. He also invented slobbering, to less acclaim.

== Minor recurring characters ==
=== Herman Post ===
First appearance: July 19, 1978

Jon Arbuckle's mailman is a character seen in the first four seasons of Garfield and Friends. In "The Mail Animal", he is fired because his boss, the postmaster, perceives him as being weak-willed. However, Garfield treats the postmaster even worse, resulting in the postmaster begging Post to return to work.

In The Garfield Show episode "Mailman Blues", he goes on vacation to Hawaii. Before Post goes on vacation, he warns his replacement, Stu, about Garfield, describing him as a "monster". While Herman Post is on his vacation, Garfield torments Stu. However, Stu quits, and Herman returns early only after receiving a raise. He reveals that this has happened every year for 13 years.

In Garfield and Friends and The Garfield Show, the mailman is voiced by Gregg Berger.

=== Irma ===
First appearance: June 9, 1979

Irma owns an unnamed diner in which Jon and Garfield often eat. Working 24/7 by herself, she is known for bad food that has unnamed ingredients, which even Garfield doesn't want to know. Garfield is quoted as saying, "She's the only person who could put me off food".

=== Binky the Clown ===
First animated appearance: October 30, 1985

First appearance: September 17, 1986

A television personality noted for his extremely loud and piercing greetings, most notably "HEEEEEEEY, KIDS!" He appears to be a parody of Bozo the Clown, and in the cartoons shares an exaggerated raspy voice with the Bob Bell portrayal of Bozo. He is often compared to Krusty the Clown from The Simpsons, who is also portrayed with an exaggeratedly raspy voice, based on Bell's.

The character first appeared in the animated TV special Garfield's Halloween Adventure.

He was first mentioned in the comic strip on March 13, 1985. Other clowns are seen prior to this mention, but appear to be different characters. Binky was first seen in the comics on September 15, 1986, then appeared in person on September 17, 1986.

=== The Big Vicious Dog/Luca ===
First appearance: September 12, 1995

A large guard dog who lives in Garfield's neighborhood who despite often coming into conflict with and harassing Garfield, is shown to be friendly with him. In the 2004 movie, he is a black Doberman Pinscher named Luca and voiced by Brad Garrett and has the same frenemy relationship with Garfield that he does in the comic.

=== Herman Vermin ===
First appearance: July 29, 1998

Herman Vermin is a second mouse in the Garfield comic strip who might be friends with Squeak Mouse, but never appears with him. He has a curly tail with one loop in it. When he moves in, he invites Garfield to his "hole-warming party". He also tells Garfield that his job is posing for anti-vermin posters.

=== Hubert and Reba ===
Hubert and Reba are an elderly couple who live near Jon. Hubert is often portrayed as an older man, while Reba is often either unseen or tending to household chores. The couple made an appearance in Here Comes Garfield. In the animated cartoon, Hubert is portrayed as hostile towards Garfield and Odie, after Garfield tore up their yard and knocked flowers and dirt on Hubert's head. He calls the animal shelter personnel to remove them. In the strips, Hubert is less hostile towards Garfield.

=== Kimmy ===
First appearance: November 23, 1990

Kimmy meets Jon at a pottery class and she actually asks Jon to ask her out. Later Jon finds out she was raised by wolves when she has an itch on her back and uses her foot to scratch it. Jon stops seeing her, but in a later comic he calls her on the phone out of desperation.

=== The Buddy Bears ===
A trio of bears that sing and appear in multiple episodes of Garfield and Friends. They are named Billy, Bobby and Bertie Buddy Bear. Their appearances usually involve them trying to educate their viewers and other characters, such as agreements, friendship and sweetness, but they are usually disturbing and contradictory at best. They have their own in-universe TV show called The Buddy Bears Show.

=== Vito ===
Vito Cappelletti (voiced by Jason Marsden) is an Italian chef who owns his own restaurant, Vito's Pizzeria, where Garfield was born. It's because he was born in an Italian restaurant that Garfield loves Italian food so much, especially lasagna and pizza.

== One appearance characters ==
=== Guido and Fluffy ===
First Appearance: January 25, 1981 (Guido), January 26, 1981 (Fluffy)

Guido and Fluffy are two cats that meet Garfield in the pound. Garfield says about them, "I met them when I had a brief stay behind bars." Both Guido and Fluffy help Garfield escape when Guido uses Garfield as a bashing ram to crash through the wall of the pound.

=== Biff ===
First Appearance: May 4, 1998

Garfield hires an intern named Biff Cat who he uses to do work for him. Biff is too nice. When Garfield tells him to, "Go practice your menacing glare", Biff stares at Jon and says, "Fear me, sir", while smiling.

=== Ellen ===
First Appearance: July 20, 2006

Ellen is a woman who Jon asks out many times on the phone before he meets Liz. She finally agrees to go out with him because she has amnesia and appears for the first time on July 20, 2006. In the same fortnight of strips, Jon realizes he really wants Liz when he sees her on a date with someone else, and Liz decides she really wants Jon. The man who was on a date with Liz then takes Ellen out instead as Jon and Liz get together.

=== Janice ===
First Appearance: February 12, 2011

Janice is sometimes referred to as Odie's girlfriend. She is a cute poodle who walks by him and says "Urf", as her only spoken word, leaving Odie looking lovestruck. Garfield tells him, "Don't fall in love Odie. You already act stupid enough."

=== Nunzio ===
Nunzio Cappelletti appears in The Garfield Show as Vito's cousin. While Vito thinks he's lazy, Nunzio is actually a good guy. He creates a scheme called the "Lasagna Tree" (see Garfield in the Lasagna Tree, Part 1-5) where he publicizes the Lasagna Tree and helps his aunt to share her lasagna recipe with the world. This allows Nunzio's aunt (Vito's mama) to share the recipe with Mama Meany (who actually is a man who wants to put every Italian restaurant out of business) while Garfield makes him broadcast to the world that his food is junk and overpriced.

== Appearing in the films ==
=== Billy Bear ===
First Appearance: Garfield Gets Real, 2007

Billy Bear (voiced by Fred Tatasciore) is a brown bear who is a showman and a trickster, often saying that blowing nose is "art", he is the star of the comic strip "Billy Bear Woods", and works along with his rabbit friend Randy Rabbit in the Comic Studio.

=== Randy Rabbit ===
First Appearance: Garfield Gets Real, 2007

Randy Rabbit (voiced by Stephen Stanton) is Billy Bear's best friend who co-stars in his friend's comic "Billy Bear Woods", he is often hyperactive and innocent.

=== Walter "Wally" Stegman ===
First Appearance: Garfield Gets Real, 2007

Walter "Wally" Stegman (voiced by Neil Ross impersonating Bill Thompson) is an inventor and co-star of the comic strip "Life Stinks" along with his wife Bonita, he is a nice man and often innocent, being often mistreated by his sarcastic wife.

=== Bonita Stegman ===
First Appearance: Garfield Gets Real, 2007

Bonita Stegman (voiced by Jennifer Darling) is Wally's wife and co-star of the comic strip "Life Stinks". She is often sarcastic and harsh in her words for her husband and is often grumpy. She also treats Wally like a child mostly.

=== Charles ===
First Appearance: Garfield Gets Real, 2007

Charles (voiced by Neil Ross) is the Director of the Comic Studio workers, who often tells the comic strip characters how they should pose and act, he is accompanied by his assistant Betty.

=== Betty ===
First Appearance: Garfield Gets Real, 2007

Betty (voiced by Audrey Wasilewski) is the dorky assistant of Charles, she helps in publishing the comic-strips and sending them to the real-world.

In Garfield's Pet Force, she falls in love towards Garzooka.

=== Shecky ===
First Appearance: Garfield Gets Real, 2007

Shecky (voiced by Gregg Berger) is a buck-toothed cat from the real world, who doesn't believe that Garfield is from a comic strip. At the end of the movie, he goes to live in the Comic World, often making small appearances in the sequels.

=== Zelda ===
First Appearance: Garfield Gets Real, 2007

Zelda (voiced by Audrey Wasilewski) works at the Comic Strip Cafeteria. She is known for her sarcastic personality and blunt manner (specially when Garfield playfully flirts with her). Despite her tired appearance, she is portrayed as gentle and easygoing.

=== Prop Boy ===
First Appearance: Garfield Gets Real, 2007

Prop Boy (voiced by Frank Welker) is a young worker in the Comic Studio known for being resourceful and efficient. he often has the appropriate tool or prop available. He cares a lot about his props like when he tells Odie to not get too attached to a bone prop he gave to him. He has super-speed as he is always ready to whoever calls him for the scene.

=== Eli ===
First Appearance: Garfield Gets Real, 2007

Eli (voiced by Greg Eagles) works as the Head Technician at the Comic Studio. He is responsible for operating the control panel and technical equipment. He is depicted as casual and supportive, and is portrayed as a good friend to Garfield. He is often shown giving advice and listening to Garfield’s complaints.

=== Freddy Frog ===
First Appearance: Garfield's Fun Fest, 2008

Freddy the Frog (voiced by Tim Conway) is a frog from a fairy tale that Garfield and Odie once read, he soon proves to be real, and he acts as a mentor for Garfield, in a self-discovery lesson for Garfield to learn what being "funny" is.
