= Garfield's Fun Fest =

- DVD cover
- Directed by: Mark A.Z. Dippé
- Written by: Jim Davis
- Based on: Garfield by Jim Davis
- Produced by: Jim Davis; John Davis
- Starring: Frank Welker; Gregg Berger; Tim Conway; Greg Eagles; Wally Wingert; Jason Marsden; Jennifer Darling; Neil Ross; Stephen Stanton; Fred Tatasciore; Audrey Wasilewski
- Narrated by: Tim Conway
- Edited by: Aaron Seelman
- Music by: Kenneth Burgomaster
- Production companies: Paws, Inc. The Animation Picture Company; Davis Entertainment
- Distributed by: 20th Century Fox Home Entertainment (United States/Canada)
- Release date: August 5, 2008
- Running time: 79 minutes
- Country: United States
- Language: English
- Box office: $3 million

Garfield's Fun Fest is a 2008 American animated comedy film based on the comic strip Garfield. It was produced by Paws, Inc., in cooperation with The Animation Picture Company. It was written by Garfield's creator Jim Davis as a sequel to Garfield Gets Real. The film was released on DVD in the United States on August 5, 2008, by 20th Century Fox Home Entertainment, and was pre-sold internationally by sales representative Velvet Octopus. It is the fourth Garfield film, and it was later followed by a fifth film, Garfield's Pet Force, in 2009.

== Plot ==
Garfield is reading a book about the origins of Freddy Frog, his pond, and the beginning of humor to Odie. At breakfast, Jon reminds Garfield that Arlene wants to do a dance with him this year for the Annual Fun Fest, but Garfield is not interested in changing his 29-year comedy routine, nor is he worried about losing, and believes he will win again, because he won the Fun Fest 29 times, and the 30th Annual Fun Fest is to come tomorrow night. Arlene finds a different dance partner, Ramone; a heartbroken Garfield leaves alone. Garfield attempts to perform a new act that is done by himself, but he bombs it due to Ramone's heckling, and his ego is deflated. Worse, Arlene and Ramone seem enamored.

At the studio's cafeteria, Odie gives Garfield a letter. When the duo opens it, they see that it's a map that leads to Freddie Frog's (from the opening scene) pond; Garfield plans to travel to the pond and drink the water in order to be funny and win the show, hoping to impress Arlene. Arlene watches him leave and realizes she has hurt Garfield's feelings. She then runs outside of the studio, but Garfield and Odie are already gone. Garfield and Odie follow the map and eventually, seemingly, make it to the pond after many obstacles and encountering the funny animals who have drunk from the pond. There, an oversized frog - Freddy - tells them that is not the pond they are looking for. Freddy agrees and leads them onto many trials that involve learning how to truly be funny. But Garfield fails to understand what the trials were about. They continue to the Funny Pond, with Garfield learning about self-deprecating humor. Meanwhile, Fun Fest director Charles worries, as Garfield was the main focus for Fun Fest and is missing. Ramone steps in and takes his place. While Arlene is disappointed that Garfield was gone and worried that he is jealous and hurt, Ramone manages to win over the audience and judges with his quips and accent.

Back in the forest, Garfield attains the pond, drinks from it, and begins to feel funny. Garfield dances around and moves playfully until he remembers Fun Fest. Garfield takes some pond water in a bottle, and Freddy gives Garfield and Odie a hang glider; they soar over the forest, thanking the animals that helped them along the way. They crash land at the Fun Fest just in time for Garfield's scheduled slot. Garfield prepares to drink the Funny Water he stored, but the bottle had been destroyed in the crash landing, and all the water is now gone. Feeling that he has lost his funny forever, Garfield gives up and leaves. From behind a curtain, Garfield watches Arlene and Ramone dance and slinks off heartbroken. Arlene and Ramone spot him as he leaves. Arlene tries to get to him, but she is pulled back by Ramone and back into dancing. Freddy shows up and tells Garfield that the funny water was just plain water and it was never the funny water that made him funny, but rather himself that was funny because of what he has done over his adventure; learning that humour is about honesty, heart, and humiliation. Freddy encourages Garfield to follow his heart by telling him that this should not even be about being funny and will be the only chance to prove himself. Knowing that Freddy's right, Garfield regains his hope. Determined to set things right with Arlene, Garfield goes back to the stage.

Arlene meets Garfield on stage in his costume, and they dance. Not wanting to be upstaged, Ramone confronts Garfield and the two cats fight. In the process, Garfield rips off Ramone's clothing, revealing Ramone to be a robot. Using one of Ramone's robotic arms, Garfield rips off the legs and robot face, revealing it to be Nermal in a robot suit, much to Garfield and Arlene's anger and to the shock of the crowd and judges. As the crowd cheers for Garfield's performance, they boo Nermal and force him to shamefully get off the stage, disqualifying him. Garfield and Arlene share an encore and Garfield apologizes to Arlene for not even trying to dance with Arlene, as this was more important than winning. However, the two win cheers from everyone and win the contest by getting the first perfect score in Fun Fest history. Garfield and Arlene are crowned winners of Fun Fest while Nermal starts thinking of other ideas for next year's Fun Fest, much to Odie's disapproval and disbelief. Freddy finishes the story and flies off on the hang glider back to the pond.

== Cast ==
- Frank Welker - Garfield, Jeff, Leonard, Delivery Gnome, Prop Boy
- Tim Conway - Freddy Frog, Gate Guard, Roger, Narrator
- Gregg Berger - Odie, Shecky
- Jennifer Darling - Bonita Stegman, Betty, Bonnie Bear
- Greg Eagles - Eli
- Jason Marsden - Nermal/Ramone
- Neil Ross - Walter "Wally" Stegman, Charles
- Stephen Stanton - Randy Rabbit, Stanislavsky
- Fred Tatasciore - Billy Bear, Junior Bear
- Audrey Wasilewski - Arlene, Momma Bear, Zelda
- Wally Wingert - Jon Arbuckle

== Release ==
Garfield's Fun Fest was released on DVD on August 5, 2008, by 20th Century Fox Home Entertainment. International sale rights were held by Velvet Octopus.

== Box office ==
The film opened in nine countries. Its most profitable market was Brazil, where the film generated $729,560 in revenue and opened at sixth place with $219,801. The film had a 2013 re-release in Portugal, and opened to $9,048, finishing eighth at the box office. The film dropped to 14th and 19th in its second and third weekends and finished with $21,705.

== Critical response ==
Paul Mavis of DVD Talk said in his review: "Maybe the problem is that Garfield creator Jim Davis, who wrote this movie, can't translate his humor into an 80 minute film. What's funny in a three-panel strip becomes drawn out and forced in a feature-length film. The obvious video-game structuring of the scenes is to be expected, I guess, in these days of rampant, voracious synergy, but that doesn't make the film any more palatable."

== Video game ==
A Nintendo DS game that is based on the film was released on July 29, 2008. It was developed by Black Lantern Studios and published by DSI Games in North America and Zoo Digital Publishing in Europe.

== Sequel ==
Following the success of Fun Fest, a sequel to the film, titled Garfield's Pet Force, was released on June 16, 2009. It is the final instalment in a trilogy of computer animation Garfield films, including Fun Fest and Garfield Gets Real.
