= The Animation Picture Company =

American animation studio

- Company type: Private; Animation Studio
- Industry: Animation
- Founded: Late 2006 (original); August 27, 2010 (revival)
- Defunct: July 2, 2010 (original)
- Headquarters: 13400 Ventura Blvd. Sherman Oaks, California, 91423 USA
- Key people: Dan Chuba; John Davis; Mark A.Z. Dippé; Brian Manis; Ash Shah
- Website: tapconline.com

The Animation Picture Company, formerly known as Hammerhead Studios, is an American animation studio based in Sherman Oaks, California.

== History ==
The company was founded in late 2006 by Dan Chuba, John Davis, Mark A.Z. Dippé, Brian Manis, and Ash Shah. In 2011, the company acquired E. L. Katz's Zombie Pet Shop screenplay and developed it into a 3D animated feature film. In 2012, the firm collaborated with SC Films to produce Flying South.

== Filmography ==
=== Video Game productions ===
Year	Title	Director	Publisher	Developer
2006	The Legend of Spyro: A New Beginning	Steve Stamatiadis	Sierra Entertainment	Krome Studios (console, GBA); Amaze Entertainment (DS)

=== Animation productions ===
Year	Title	Director	Distributor	Notes
2007	Crash Bandicoot web cartoons	Jamie Dixton	Sierra Entertainment	
2007	Garfield Gets Real	Mark A.Z. Dippé	20th Century Fox Home Entertainment	co-production with Paws, Inc. and Davis Entertainment
2008	Garfield's Fun Fest	Mark A.Z. Dippé	20th Century Fox Home Entertainment	co-production with Paws, Inc. and Davis Entertainment
2009	Garfield's Pet Force	Mark A.Z. Dippé; Kyung Ho Lee	20th Century Fox Home Entertainment	co-production with Paws, Inc. and Davis Entertainment
2010	Space Chimps 2: Zartog Strikes Back	John H. Williams	20th Century Fox Home Entertainment	
2012	The Outback	Kyung Ho Lee	Blue Sky Media	co-production with Digiart Productions, Lotte Entertainment and Anarchy Post
2014	The Reef 2: High Tide	Mark A.Z. Dippé Taedong Park	CJ Entertainment	
2022	Marmaduke	Mark Dippé	Netflix	

=== Special/VFX Effects productions ===
Year	Film	Director	Distributor
2008	Dr. Dolittle: Tail to the Chief	Craig Shapiro	20th Century Fox Home Entertainment
2009	S. Darko	Chris Fisher	20th Century Fox Home Entertainment
2009	Scooby-Doo! The Mystery Begins	Brian Levant	Warner Premiere
2010	Scooby-Doo! Curse of the Lake Monster	Brian Levant	Warner Premiere
2011	A Fairly Odd Movie: Grow Up, Timmy Turner!	Savage Steve Holland	Paramount Home Entertainment
2012	A Fairly Odd Christmas	Savage Steve Holland	Paramount Home Entertainment
2014	A Fairly Odd Summer	Savage Steve Holland	Paramount Home Entertainment
