= Garfield Gets Real =

- DVD cover
- Directed by: Mark A.Z. Dippé
- Written by: Jim Davis
- Based on: Garfield by Jim Davis
- Produced by: Jim Davis; John Davis
- Starring: Frank Welker; Gregg Berger; Audrey Wasilewski; Greg Eagles; Wally Wingert; Jason Marsden; Jennifer Darling; Pat Fraley; Neil Ross; Stephen Stanton; Fred Tatasciore
- Edited by: Rob Neal
- Music by: Kenneth Burgomaster
- Production companies: Davis Entertainment; Paws, Inc. The Animation Picture Company
- Distributed by: 20th Century Fox Home Entertainment
- Release date: August 9, 2007
- Running time: 77 minutes
- Country: United States
- Language: English
- Budget: $10 million
- Box office: $1.7 million

Garfield Gets Real (also known as Garfield 3D in some regions) is a 2007 American animated adventure comedy film based on the comic strip Garfield. It was produced by Paws, Inc. in cooperation with Davis Entertainment, and The Animation Picture Company and distributed by 20th Century Fox Home Entertainment. It was written by Garfield's creator Jim Davis, who started working on the script in the autumn of 1996. It is the third Garfield film, after Garfield: The Movie and Garfield: A Tail of Two Kitties. This was the first fully animated Garfield production since the 1991 television special Garfield Gets a Life, and the series finale of Garfield and Friends. The DVD was shipped to stores on August 9, 2007.

== Plot ==
Garfield lives with dog Odie and owner Jon Arbuckle in a world inhabited by cartoon characters. They work at the Comic Studios with other comic strip characters, such as his girlfriend Arlene, frenemy Nermal, Billy Bear, Randy Rabbit, & inventor Wally Stegman & his wife, Bonita, where the comics are made in their world. The comics are then sent to the real world where they're made in books & newspapers. Garfield is tired of the old jokes his friends crack and is bored with life in Toon World, so he longs to go to the real world. The Garfield Comic Strip requires a bone for Odie, but he does not want to return it to the prop boy and tries to hide it. However, he accidentally makes the bone go through the screen in the studio, causing it to be sucked into the real world.

Eli, the head technician, explains to the toons that the screen separates Toon World and the real world with no way back. Garfield sees his chance for a change in life and goes through the screen without anyone noticing. As soon as he enters the Real World, the characters discover this on their projector. Eli blocks the patch in the screen border by putting special tape on it so no one can gain access to the real world. However, Odie jumps onto the screen trying to get his bone, which is on the screen but actually is in the real world. He gets sucked there as well before the patch is sealed, making Garfield and Odie permanently stuck in the real world. Garfield tries to get Odie back to Toon World, but due to him not listening to Eli's warnings, fails to do so. Odie gets his bone back and finds some food with Garfield. While trying to get used to their new surroundings, Garfield meets an alley cat named Shecky who yearns to be a star. Meanwhile, Odie is chased by a gang of Chihuahuas who want his bone, but Garfield helps him by grabbing the bone and running through a hole in a tree that is small for the Chihuahua's fat owner to get through.

The duo learns from Shecky that strays get food by annoying the people who live in a building and the people start throwing food at Shecky. They then head to "Club Shecky", which is the alley Shecky lives in. Garfield and Odie then meet Sheila, a not-so-kind cat, and Waldo, a hound dog. After dinner, he brings the duo to their new home, an abandoned inn populated by colonies of stray pets called Hotel Muncie, where he invites them to join the family. The next day, the duo finds out that due to their absence, their comic is getting canceled. Garfield finds an article asking people to try out and replace him. The duo head for the place where they are doing try-outs and try to impress the judges, but fail due to the judges not realizing they're the real ones and they decide to hire Hale and Hardy, an equally muscular cat and dog, to replace them. However, after second thoughts, the judges come to their senses and give Garfield & Odie one more chance: if they do not make it back home in a day, Hale and Hardy will replace them. Garfield gives Wally an idea of building a big tunnel that can go through the screen after remembering one of Wally's latest inventions earlier. Wally shares the idea with his friends back in Toon World.

Later that night, Hale and Hardy, who are determined to stop the duo, capture everyone in the inn and set the hotel on fire. Billy Bear, Wally, and Jon go through the tunnel (which Wally dubs the Bonitanator due to the blade reminding him of his wife) to save the three friends, but all the exits are blocked. Luckily, Shecky finds a fireproof trash cart, and everyone is about to escape when Odie jumps to grab his bone on the chandelier. Garfield grabs Odie's paw on the second floor and tries to pull him onto the cart, but Odie pulls Garfield onto the chandelier instead, which is about to collapse. Garfield grabs Jon's hand, and the entire cart is flung into the air as the chandelier collapses, causing the cart to fall to the ground with the chandelier on it. The cart crashes out of the hotel and the group is flung into the big tunnel as it closes, disappears, and transported back to Toon World. Following this, Shecky then decides to stay with the group.

The next day, everyone from both worlds (except Hale & Hardy, who now live on the streets) celebrate Garfield & Odie's return and Shecky accomplishes his dream of making it to stardom. Later, the Chihuahuas who kept chasing Odie's bone in the real world are shown to have secretly stowed away on the tunnel.

== Cast ==
Cast	Role
Frank Welker	Garfield, Hardy, Keith, Prop Boy, Two Headed Guy, Goth Boy
Wally Wingert	Jon Arbuckle, Mike
Gregg Berger	Odie, Shecky, Hale
Jennifer Darling	Bonita, Bobby, Rusty, Mother
Pat Fraley	Sid, Delivery Gnome
Jason Marsden	Nermal
Neil Ross	Wally, Charles
Audrey Wasilewski	Arlene, Zelda, Betty, Ashley
Stephen Stanton	Randy Rabbit, Father
Greg Eagles	Eli
Fred Tatasciore	Billy Bear, Waldo, Eric
Rajia Baroudi	Sheila, Concertina Girl
Harold Perrineau	Husband
David Mitchie	Tape Holder

=== Cameos ===
Similar to Who Framed Roger Rabbit and Toy Story, Garfield Gets Real has a few cameo appearances by licensed comic strip characters:

- Dagwood Bumstead from Blondie
- Grimm from Mother Goose and Grimm

== Reception ==
=== Box office ===
The film was only released theatrically in Turkey. The film started at second in its opening weekend, grossing $592,974 from 130 theaters, with an average of $4,561 per theater. The film stayed second the next weekend, falling 34.1% to $390,688, before dropping down to third in its third weekend, decreasing 30.9% to $269,798. The film fell down to fifth in its fourth weekend, decreasing 40.8% to $159,768.

=== Critical reception ===
The film received generally negative reviews from critics. Brian Costello awarded the film 2 out of 5 stars, criticizing the juvenile humor, but writing, "this movie is best for younger children and fans of the Garfield comic strip".

== Video game ==
A video game for the Nintendo DS based on the film, Garfield Gets Real, was released in the United States on July 21, 2009 and received negative reviews.

== Sequels ==
Despite its negative critical reception, and only earning a total of $1.7 million on a budget of $10 million, the film was the first of a trilogy of computer-animated Garfield films, with a sequel, Garfield's Fun Fest, being released in 2008, and another, Garfield's Pet Force, in 2009.
