= Davis Entertainment =

American film and television production company

- On-screen logo used since 2010
- Type: Film and television production company
- Industry: Entertainment
- Founded: 1984; 42 years ago
- Founder: John Davis
- Headquarters: Los Angeles, California, United States
- Products: Motion pictures Television programs

Davis Entertainment (also known as Davis Entertainment Company) is an American independent film and television production company, founded by John Davis in 1984.

Davis's three divisions–feature film, independent film, and television–develop and produce film and television projects for the major studios, independent distributors, networks and cable broadcasters. The company itself has enjoyed a long-standing first-look production deal at 20th Century Studios, although it also produces projects for all studios and mini-majors.

== History ==
The company was founded in 1984 by filmmaker John Davis and it was incorporated in Nevada on December 2, 1985. The company was officially established on May 21, 1986, in order to produce mid-to-high budget action films that were financed entirely by a studio, starting with Predator, a co-production with Lawrence Gordon Productions and Silver Pictures, and a series of other films that were planned for release by 20th Century Fox. It was decided that it would be done independently with co-investors, and it would help anticipate the expansion of telefilms and sitcoms.

On February 18, 1987, Davis Entertainment partnered with Mark L. Lester of his Mark Lester Films company in order to handle the development of action-adventure films which were produced by the company, directed by Mark L. Lester, and it was independently financed by the two companies. The films that were made by the Lester/Davis alliance had ranked in the $5–10 million range, and would expect the co-venture to handle the production of two films before the yearend.

In 1994, it launched its first foray into interactive games, and launched Catapult Entertainment, Inc., intended to produce a modem that would link video game players by telephone lines; this would end up becoming the XBAND. That same year, Davis Entertainment Company signed a production deal with 20th Century Fox to develop feature films.

In 1995, Davis Entertainment launched its art-house division Davis Entertainment Classics, which was subsequently renamed Davis Entertainment Filmworks in 2002. In 1998, Davis Entertainment struck a deal with 20th Century Fox Television to produce television shows for its networks, both broadcast and cable.

In 2007, Michael Dorman joined its television division. At the same time, they signed a development pact with Fox Television Studios to produce series for television.

In 2011, John Fox, a former employee of 20th Century Fox, joined the company. In 2013, it signed a deal with Sony Pictures Television to develop television shows for platforms, broadcast, cable and streaming.

== Filmography ==
=== Theatrical films ===
==== 1980s ====
Year	Title	Director	Distributor	Notes
1987	Predator	John McTiernan	20th Century Fox	co-production with Lawrence Gordon Productions and Silver Pictures
1987	Three O'Clock High	Phil Joanou	Universal Pictures	uncredited; co-production with Aaron Spelling Productions
1988	License to Drive	Greg Beeman	20th Century Fox	co-production with Licht/Mueller Productions
1989	Little Monsters	Richard Alan Greenberg	MGM/UA Distribution Co.	co-production with Licht/Mueller Productions, Vestron Pictures and United Artists

==== 1990s ====
Year	Title	Director	Distributor	Notes
1990	The Last of the Finest	John Mackenzie	Orion Pictures	
1990	Predator 2	Stephen Hopkins	20th Century Fox	co-production with Gordon Company and Silver Pictures
1991	Shattered	Wolfgang Petersen	MGM/UA Distribution Co.	co-production with Capella International, Palace Pictures and Metro-Goldwyn-Mayer
1992	Fortress	Stuart Gordon	Dimension Films; Columbia Pictures	co-production with Village Roadshow Pictures
1992	Storyville	Mark Frost	20th Century Fox	
1993	The Firm	Sydney Pollack	Paramount Pictures	
1993	The Thing Called Love	Peter Bogdanovich	Paramount Pictures	
1993	Grumpy Old Men	Donald Petrie	Warner Bros.	
1994	Gunmen	Deran Sarafian	Dimension Films; LIVE Entertainment	
1994	Richie Rich	Donald Petrie	Warner Bros.	co-production with The Harvey Entertainment Company and Silver Pictures
1995	The Hunted	J.F. Lawton	Universal Pictures	co-production with Bregman/Baer Productions, Inc.
1995	Waterworld	Kevin Reynolds	Universal Pictures	co-production with Gordon Company and Licht/Mueller Film Corporation
1995	Grumpier Old Men	Howard Deutch	Warner Bros.	
1995	The Grass Harp	Charles Matthau	Fine Line Features	co-production with Alliance Communications
1996	Denise Calls Up	Hal Salwen	Sony Pictures Classics	co-production with Skyline Entertainment Partners, Dark Matters Productions, J. Thomas Harris Productions and Alliance Communications
1996	The Chamber	James Foley	Universal Pictures	co-production with Imagine Entertainment
1996	Daylight	Rob Cohen	Universal Pictures	co-production with Joseph M. Singer Entertainment
1996	Courage Under Fire	Edward Zwick	20th Century Fox	co-production with Fox 2000 Pictures, Joseph M. Singer Entertainment and Friendly Films
1997	Out to Sea	Martha Coolidge	20th Century Fox	co-production with Friendly Films
1998	Dr. Dolittle	Betty Thomas	20th Century Fox	co-production with Joseph M. Singer Entertainment and Friendly Films
1999	Dudley-Do-Right	Hugh Wilson	Universal Pictures	co-production with Jay Ward Productions and Joseph M. Singer Entertainment

==== 2000s ====
Year	Title	Director	Distributor	Notes
2001	Heartbreakers	David Mirkin	MGM Distribution Co.	co-production with Metro-Goldwyn-Mayer and Winchester Films
2001	Dr. Dolittle 2	Steve Carr	20th Century Fox	
2001	Behind Enemy Lines	John Moore	20th Century Fox	
2002	Life or Something Like It	Stephen Herek	20th Century Fox	co-production with Aei Entertainment, Regency Enterprises and New Regency
2003	Daddy Day Care	Steve Carr	Sony Pictures Releasing	co-production with Columbia Pictures and Revolution Studios
2003	Paycheck	John Woo	Paramount Pictures	co-production with DreamWorks Pictures and Lion Rock Productions
2004	Garfield	Peter Hewitt	20th Century Fox	co-production with Paws, Inc.
2004	I, Robot	Alex Proyas	20th Century Fox	co-production with Mediastream IV, Laurence Mark Productions and Overbrook Films
2004	Alien vs. Predator	Paul W.S. Anderson	20th Century Fox	co-production with Brandywine Productions, Impact Pictures and Stillking Films
2004	First Daughter	Forest Whitaker	20th Century Fox	co-production with Regency Enterprises and New Regency
2004	Fat Albert	Joel Zwick	20th Century Fox	
2004	Flight of the Phoenix	John Moore	20th Century Fox	
2006	When a Stranger Calls	Simon West	Sony Pictures Releasing	co-production with Screen Gems
2006	Garfield: A Tail of Two Kitties	Tim Hill	20th Century Fox	co-production with Paws, Inc.
2006	Eragon	Stefen Fangmeier	20th Century Fox	
2007	Norbit	Brian Robbins	Paramount Pictures	co-production with DreamWorks Pictures and Tollin/Robbins Productions
2007	Daddy Day Camp	Fred Savage	Sony Pictures Releasing	co-production with TriStar Pictures and Revolution Studios
2007	The Heartbreak Kid	Farrelly brothers	Paramount Pictures	co-production with DreamWorks Pictures, Radar Pictures and Conundrum Entertainment
2007	Aliens vs. Predator: Requiem	Strause brothers	20th Century Fox	co-production with Brandywine Productions and Dune Entertainment
2008	The Express: The Ernie Davis Story	Gary Fleder	Universal Pictures	co-production with Relativity Media

==== 2010s ====
Year	Title	Director	Distributor	Notes
2010	Marmaduke	Tom Dey	20th Century Fox	co-production with Dune Entertainment and Regency Enterprises
2010	Predators	Nimród Antal	20th Century Fox	co-production with Dune Entertainment and Troublemaker Studios
2010	Gulliver's Travels	Rob Letterman	20th Century Fox	co-production with Dune Entertainment
2011	Mr. Popper's Penguins	Mark Waters	20th Century Fox	co-production with Dune Entertainment
2011	A Little Bit of Heaven	Nicole Kassell	Millennium Entertainment	co-production with The Film Department
2012	Chronicle	Josh Trank	20th Century Fox	co-production with Dune Entertainment
2014	Devil's Due	Matt Bettinelli-Olpin; Tyler Gillett	20th Century Fox	co-production with Radio Silence Productions
2015	The Man from U.N.C.L.E.	Guy Ritchie	Warner Bros. Pictures	co-production with RatPac-Dune Entertainment, Ritchie/Wigram Productions and Turner Entertainment Co.
2015	Victor Frankenstein	Paul McGuigan	20th Century Fox	
2015	Joy	David O. Russell	20th Century Fox	co-production with Annapurna Pictures and Fox 2000 Pictures
2017	Ferdinand	Carlos Saldanha	20th Century Fox	co-production with Blue Sky Studios and 20th Century Fox Animation
2018	Game Night	John Francis Daley; Jonathan Goldstein	Warner Bros. Pictures	co-production with New Line Cinema, Access Entertainment and Aggregate Films
2018	The Predator	Shane Black	20th Century Fox	
2019	Shaft	Tim Story	Warner Bros. Pictures	co-production with Netflix and New Line Cinema

==== 2020s ====
Year	Title	Director	Distributor	Notes
2021	Jungle Cruise	Jaume Collet-Serra	Walt Disney Studios Motion Pictures	co-production with Walt Disney Pictures, Seven Bucks Productions and Flynn Picture Company
2024	Harold and the Purple Crayon	Carlos Saldanha	Sony Pictures Releasing	co-production with Columbia Pictures
2025	Flight Risk	Mel Gibson	Lionsgate	co-production with Icon Productions, Hammerstone Studios, Flight Risk Films and Media Capital Technologies
2025	The Pickup	Tim Story	Amazon MGM Studios	co-production with The Story Company and Eddie Murphy Productions
2025	Predator: Badlands	Dan Trachtenberg	Walt Disney Studios Motion Pictures	co-production with 20th Century Studios and Lawrence Gordon Productions
2025	Song Sung Blue	Craig Brewer	Focus Features	
2026	72 Hours	Tim Story	Netflix	co-production with Sony Pictures, Hartbeat Productions, Counterbalance Entertainment, and The Story Company

=== Direct-to-video films ===
==== 1990s ====
Year	Title	Director	Distributor	Notes
1990	Enid Is Sleeping	Maurice Phillips	Live Home Video	co-production with Vestron Pictures

==== 2000s ====
Year	Title	Director	Distributor	Notes
2000	The Settlement	Mark Steilen	MTI Home Video	co-production with CineTel Films, Dosgmile Pictures and JeanRoy Entertainment
2000	Labor Pains	Tracy Alexson	USA Home Entertainment	uncredited; co-production with Dogsmile Pictures and Prosperity Pictures
2006	Dr. Dolittle 3	Rich Thorne	20th Century Home Entertainment	
2007	Garfield Gets Real	Mark A.Z. Dippé	20th Century Home Entertainment	co-production with The Animation Picture Company and Paws, Inc.
2008	Dr. Dolittle: Tail to the Chief	Craig Shapiro	20th Century Home Entertainment	
2008	Garfield's Fun Fest	Mark A.Z. Dippé	20th Century Home Entertainment	co-production with The Animation Picture Company and Paws, Inc.
2009	Dr. Dolittle: Million Dollar Mutts	Alex Zamm	20th Century Home Entertainment	
2009	Garfield's Pet Force	Mark A.Z. Dippé; Kyung Ho-Lee	20th Century Home Entertainment	co-production with The Animation Picture Company and Paws, Inc.

=== Television/streaming films ===
==== 1990s ====
Year	Title	Director	Network	Notes
1990	Curiosity Kills	Colin Bucksey	USA Network	co-production with MTE
1990	Dangerous Passion	Michael Miller	ABC	co-production with Stormy Weather Productions and Carolco Pictures
1990	Silhouette	Carl Schenkel	USA Network	co-production with Faye Dunaway Productions and MTE
1992	Wild Card	Mel Damski	USA Network	co-production with MTE
1993	The Last Outlaw	Geoff Murphy	HBO	co-production with HBO Pictures
1993	Voyage	John Mackenzie	USA Network	co-production with ITC Entertainment, Quinta Communications and USA Pictures
1994	This Can't Be Love	Anthony Harvey	CBS	co-production with World International Network and Pacific Motion Pictures
1994	One Christmas	Tony Bill	NBC	co-production with Karpf Productions
1994	Tears and Laughter: The Joan and Melissa Rivers Story	Oz Scott	NBC	
1994	New Eden	Alan Metzger	Sci-Fi Channel	co-production with MTE
1997	Asteroid	Bradford May	NBC	co-production with NBC Studios
1997	Volcano: Fire on the Mountain	Graeme Campbell	ABC	co-production with Pacific Motion Pictures and World International Network
1998	Miracle at Midnight	Ken Cameron	ABC	co-production with Walt Disney Television
1999	The Jesse Ventura Story	David Jackson	NBC	co-production with NBC Studios

==== 2000s ====
Year	Title	Director	Network	Notes
2000	Little Richard	Robert Townsend	NBC	co-production with Fox Television Studios
2001	Sunk on Christmas Eve	Bill Jardine	National Geographic Channel	
2005	Nadine in Date Land	Amie Steir	Oxygen	co-production with Departure Studios
2005	Life Is Ruff	Charles Haid	Disney Channel	co-production with Salty Pictures
2007	Jump In!	Paul Hoen	Disney Channel	co-production with Hop, Skip and Jump Productions

==== 2010s ====
Year	Title	Director	Network	Notes
2011	Locke & Key	Mark Romanek	Fox	television pilot; co-production with 20th Century Fox Television, DreamWorks Television and K/O Paper Products
2017	Behind Enemy Lines	McG	Fox	television pilot; co-production with 20th Century Fox Television and Temple Hill Entertainment
2019	Dolemite Is My Name	Craig Brewer	Netflix	limited theatrical release

==== 2020s ====
Year	Title	Director	Network	Notes
2020	Echo	TBA	NBC	pilot order; co-production with Universal Television
2022	Prey	Dan Trachtenberg	Hulu	co-production with 20th Century Studios and Lawrence Gordon Productions
2024	Uglies	McG	Netflix	co-production with Anonymous Content, Industry Entertainment, YRF Entertainment and Wonderland Sound and Vision
2025	Predator: Killer of Killers	Dan Trachtenberg	Hulu	co-production with 20th Century Studios, 20th Century Animation and Lawrence Gordon Productions

=== Television series ===
==== 2010s ====
Year	Title	Creators	Network	Notes
2013–2023	The Blacklist	Jon Bokenkamp	NBC	co-production with Open 4 Business Productions, Universal Television and Sony Pictures Television
2013	Ironside	based on the 1967 series by: Collier Young developed by: Michael Caleo	NBC	co-production with Post 109, Yellow Brick Road Productions and Universal Television
2015	The Player	John Rogers; John Fox	NBC	co-production with Kung Fu Monkey Productions, Universal Television and Sony Pictures Television
2015–2017	Dr. Ken	Jared Stern; Ken Jeong; John Fox	ABC	co-production with Old Charlie Productions, ABC Studios and Sony Pictures Television
2016–2018	Timeless	Eric Kripke; Shawn Ryan	NBC	co-production with Kripke Enterprises, MiddKid Productions, Universal Television and Sony Pictures Television
2017	The Blacklist: Redemption	Jon Bokenkamp; John Eisendrath; Lukas Reiter; J. R. Orci	NBC	co-production with John Eisendrath Productions, Flatwater Scribe, Open 4 Business Productions, Universal Television and Sony Pictures Television
2018	Alex, Inc.	Matt Tarses based on StartUp podcast by: Gimlet Media, Inc.	ABC	co-production with Two Soups Productions, ABC Studios and Sony Pictures Television
2018–2024	Magnum, P.I.	based on the 1980 TV series by: Donald P. Bellisario; Glen A. Larson developed by: Peter M. Lenkov; Eric Guggenheim	CBS/NBC	co-production with 101st Street Entertainment, Perfect Storm Entertainment, Universal Television and CBS Studios

==== 2020s ====
Year	Title	Creators	Network	Notes
2021–2025	The Equalizer	based on the 1985 TV series by: Michael Sloan; Richard Lindheim developed by: Queen Latifah; Richard Lindheim	CBS	co-production with Flavor Unit Entertainment, Martin Chase Productions, Milmar Pictures (seasons 1–2), Wilson Avenue (season 3), Shattered Glass (season 3), Universal Television and CBS Studios
2021	Rebel	Krista Vernoff	ABC	co-production with ABC Signature, Sony Pictures Television and Trip The Light Productions
2022	Blockbuster	Vanessa Ramos	Netflix	co-production with Universal Television, Fat Paws and Shark vs. Bear Productions
2024	Laid	based on the 2011 Australian TV series by: Marieke Hardy; Kirsty Fisher developed by: Nahnatchka Khan; Sally Bradford McKenna	Peacock	co-production with Universal Television, Porchlight Films, All3Media International, That's Bananas and Fierce Baby Productions

== Highest-grossing films ==
Highest-grossing films in the United States
Rank	Title	Year	Domestic gross	Notes
1	The Firm	1993	$158,348,367	
2	I, Robot	2004	$144,801,023	co-produced by Overbrook Entertainment
3	Dr. Dolittle	1998	$144,156,605	co-produced by Friendly Films
4	Jungle Cruise	2021	$116,987,516	co-produced by Walt Disney Pictures, Flynn Picture Company and Seven Bucks Productions
5	Dr. Dolittle 2	2001	$112,952,899	
6	Daddy Day Care	2003	$104,297,061	co-produced by Revolution Studios
7	Norbit	2007	$95,673,607	co-produced by DreamWorks Pictures and Tollin/Robbins Productions
8	Predator: Badlands	2025	$91,075,083	co-produced by 20th Century Studios and Lawrence Gordon Productions
9	Waterworld	1995	$88,246,220	co-produced by Gordon Company and Licht/Mueller Film Corporation
10	Ferdinand	2017	$84,410,380	co-produced by Blue Sky Studios
11	Alien vs. Predator	2004	$80,282,231	co-produced by Brandywine Productions
12	Garfield: The Movie	2004	$75,369,589	co-produced by Paws, Inc.
13	Eragon	2006	$75,030,163	
14	Game Night	2018	$69,179,066	co-produced by New Line Cinema, Access Entertainment and Aggregate Films
15	Mr. Popper's Penguins	2011	$68,224,452	co-produced by Dune Entertainment
16	Chronicle	2012	$64,575,175	co-produced by Dune Entertainment
17	Predator	1987	$59,735,548	co-produced by Lawrence Gordon Productions and Silver Pictures
18	Courage Under Fire	1996	$59,031,057	co-produced by Fox 2000 Pictures, Joseph M. Singer Entertainment and Friendly Films
19	Behind Enemy Lines	2001	$58,856,790	
20	Joy	2015	$56,451,232	co-produced by Annapurna Pictures and Fox 2000 Pictures
21	Predators	2010	$52,000,688	co-produced by Dune Entertainment and Troublemaker Studios
22	The Predator	2018	$51,024,708	
23	Fat Albert	2004	$48,116,322	
24	When a Stranger Calls	2006	$47,860,214	co-produced by Screen Gems
25	The Man from U.N.C.L.E.	2015	$45,445,109	
