= Shark Bait =

Shark Bait may refer to:

- Shark baiting, a procedure to attract sharks
- Shark Bait (film), a 2006 animated film
