= Koala Kid =

- Theatrical release poster
- Hangul: 코알라 키드: 영웅의 탄생
- RR: Koalla kideu: yeongungui tansaeng
- MR: K'oalla k'idŭ: yŏngungŭi t'ansaeng
- Directed by: Kyung Ho Lee
- Written by: Scott Clevenger; Chris Denk; Timothy Wayne Peternel
- Produced by: Daniel Chuba; Mark A.Z. Dippé; Ash R. Shah; Joshua Sohn; Alex J. Yoo
- Starring: Rob Schneider; Bret McKenzie; Yvonne Strahovski; Alan Cumming; Frank Welker; Norm Macdonald; Jenni Pulos; Tim Curry
- Narrated by: Rob Schneider
- Edited by: Tom Sanders
- Music by: Michael Yezerski
- Production companies: Lotte Entertainment; The Animation Picture Company; Digiart Production; Stonebridge Capital; MVP Capital
- Distributed by: 20th Century Fox Home Entertainment (USA) (video)
- Release date: January 12, 2012
- Running time: 85 minutes
- Countries: South Korea; United States
- Languages: Korean; English
- Budget: ₩5.3 million
- Box office: $8.1 million

Koala Kid (also known as Outback or The Outback; Korean: 코알라 키드: 영웅의 탄생 in South Korea) is an animated action comedy film directed by Kyung Ho Lee and released on January 12, 2012. The English dub cast consists of Rob Schneider, Bret McKenzie, Frank Welker, Yvonne Strahovski, Alan Cumming, Tim Curry, and Chris Edgerly.

== Plot ==
In Australia, a white koala named Johnny is teased about his color, so he joins a traveling circus with the help of Hamish the Tasmanian Devil, and Higgens the spider monkey photographer. He is disappointed that he is part of the freak show instead of the main acts in the big tent. The top act is "Wild Bushman" which takes all the audience from the freak show. Johnny checks out the show and accidentally becomes part of it, and The Wild Bushman saves him.

While traveling to a new location, their wagon train car becomes unattached and crashes in "The Outback". On their quest to go to the next location of the traveling circus, "Precipice Lake", they come upon a billabong. They witness from their cliff location a pack of dingos, Blacktooth, Loki, Cutter, and Butch, as well as their thylacine ally Hex, chasing a bilby but is rescued by a kangaroo named Mac, a wombat army, and Miranda, a vine-swinging female koala talented at throwing a boomerang. A vulture named Boris reveals that the Saltwater crocodile Bog intends to take over the billabong. When their rescue goes wrong, and the dingos threaten to take over, Johnny then escapes and slips down the cliff and ends up rolling on top of a boulder, chasing the dingos away. Hamish introduces the now-famous white koala as "Koala Kid". Miranda is unimpressed, but Johnny watches her from a tree as she practices. When noticed, Miranda breaks the branch he is on with her boomerang and complains about him watching in secret. He tries to lie out of that accusation but ends up suggesting he is an expert at the boomerang and is proven wrong when offered to try it himself.

Hamish plans to take photos of Johnny doing heroic stuff and make him famous as Koala Kid, so when they get back to the circus, they can get in the main act rather than the freak show and earn Hamish more money. Bog is not impressed with his gang getting chased by a koala, so he orders them to capture Koala Kid. In the chase, Miranda's younger sister Charlotte gets covered with cosmetic powder and mistaken for the Koala Kid resulting in her getting kidnapped. The billabong residents plan to rescue Charlotte but must cross the dangerous "Bungle Bungles" on their way to Precipice Lake, while at the same time, Johnny is almost devoured by the mulga snakes Monty and Merlin. This convinces Hamish to go along with Johnny's conscience and join the team to rescue Charlotte.

Johnny accidentally saves the day a few times during the trip, but Miranda is still not impressed. The two fall into a sinkhole and tell the rest of them to go on ahead. A giant monitor lizard befriends Johnny and names her Bull, he and Miranda ride it out of the caves. Just as Miranda starts to take a liking to Johnny, Boris then reveals that Johnny is just a freak show act and the "Koala Kid" thing is just a lie. Miranda tells him to leave but finds out that the gang will need to bring a koala to Bog instead of the real Koala Kid, and Charlotte will have to do. Miranda offers to take her place. Charlotte goes to find Johnny while the kangaroo and the wombat army manage to distract and capture all the gang but the vulture.

Charlotte finds Johnny along with Hamish, Higgens, and a prophetic peg-leg wombat named Quint, and they decide to help Johnny get what he wants: Miranda. Johnny calls Bull and rides off, saving Miranda. Bog shows up and gives chase, so they head to the circus hoping the Wild Bushman will be able to tame Bog. Bog proves too powerful until Johnny uses the boomerang to bring down the big top on top of Bog (and himself).

Johnny, Miranda, and Bull become the main attraction, and the bad guys are sold as pets. Johnny asks Miranda if she likes her new life, but she is unsure. Plan B is they ride off into the sunset together.

== Cast ==
- Rob Schneider as Johnny, Mac, Boy No. 1, narrator
- Bret McKenzie as Hamish
- Frank Welker as Higgens, Bull, Bully Koala No. 1, Bully Koala No. 3, Ringmaster
- Alan Cumming as Bog, Bully Koala No. 2
- Yvonne Strahovski as Miranda
- Tim Curry as Blacktooth
- Chris Edgerly as Boris
- Jenni Pulos as Charlotte, Lady, Old Lady
- Charlie Bewley as Loki
- Norm Macdonald as Quint the Peg-Leg Wombat
- Eric Lopez as The Wild Bushman, Bill, Merlin
- Nolan North as Hex the Thylacine
- Phil Proctor as Lug
- Neil Ross as Monty
- Fred Tatasciore as Cutter
- Lielle Tova Blinkoff as Little Girl

== Reception ==
The film has grossed $4.6 million at the South Korean box office.
