= Shark Bait (film) =

2006 animated film

- South Korean theatrical release poster
- Hangul: 파이 스토리
- RR: Pai seutori
- MR: P'ai sŭt'ori
- Directed by: John Fox; Howard E. Baker
- Written by: Scott Clevenger; Chris Denk; Anurag Mehta; Timothy Wayne Peternel
- Produced by: Mark A.Z. Dippé; Youngki Lee; Ash R. Shah
- Starring: Freddie Prinze, Jr. Evan Rachel Wood; Donal Logue; Andy Dick; Fran Drescher; John Rhys-Davies; Rob Schneider
- Edited by: Tom Sanders
- Music by: Christopher Lennertz
- Production companies: WonderWorld Studios; DigiArt; FXDigital
- Distributed by: CJ Entertainment (South Korea); The Weinstein Company (United States)
- Release dates: July 7, 2006 (South Korea); October 9, 2007 (United States)
- Running time: 78 minutes
- Countries: South Korea; United States
- Languages: English; Korean
- Budget: $2.5 million
- Box office: $13.6 million

Shark Bait (The Reef: Shark Bait in the UK, Australia and North America, Pi's Story (Korean: 파이 스토리) in South Korea) is a 2006 animated adventure film.

Despite being an American-South Korean co-production, the movie did not receive a theatrical release in the United States. Instead it was released direct to DVD in 2007.

A direct-to-DVD sequel, The Reef 2: High Tide was released in 2012.

== Plot ==
Pisces, known as Pi, resides with his parents, Pike and Piper, in the murky waters of Boston until one day they are captured by a fishing net. His parents help him escape the net, but are unable to escape themselves. Before being taken away, Piper makes Pi promise to stay with his aunt Pearl. Pi’s new porpoise friend Percy and his mother, Meg, offer to escort him, but Pi declines, clinging to the hope that his parents will come back. Meg sadly informs him that once trapped in a net, there’s no way to survive.

Devastated by his loss, Pi travels with Meg and Percy to the Caribbean where Pearl resides. Upon arrival, Pi meets three elderly marlins—Moe, Jack, and Manny who guide him toward Pearl’s home. On the way, he becomes enamoured with Cordelia, an angelfish model featured in National Geographic, and befriends his cousin Dylan. However, Pi soon encounters Troy, a tiger shark intent on making Cordelia his mate, and gets attacked when he confronts Troy. Cordelia tells him the real danger on the reef is anything that blocks Troy’s goal, advising him to stay away if he genuinely wants to help her.

Pi and Dylan return home, where Pearl warmly welcomes Pi. A fortune-teller assisted by her starfish assistant Madge, Pearl uses a pink pearl gifted to her by Dylan’s late father as a crystal ball. She foretells that Pi will discover his destiny on the reef, cautioning him to avoid an abandoned shipwreck and a forbidden area known as “Flat Bottom.” Leaving Dylan to guide Pi, she departs. Dylan recounts tales of Nerissa, a wise old turtle residing in the shipwreck who practices martial arts, sparking rumours of his wizardry. Pi and Dylan reach Flat Bottom, where humans fish freely. After Dylan leaves, Pi helps Cordelia, who gets caught in a lure. He takes her to Buddy and Lou, who free her. Grateful, Cordelia invites him to a concert. Later, Pi reunites with Dylan, and they see Nerissa defending his blue pearl from a gang of squids.

That night at the amphitheatre with Cordelia, Pi learns of Thornton, a seal who once claimed to have battled a colossal beast. While gazing at the stars, Cordelia realizes she has fallen in love with Pi. Suddenly, Troy aggressively confronts them. Cordelia agrees to accept Troy's pearl as a proposal if he spares Pi, but Troy knocks Pi out, and the current sweeps him to Nerissa’s shipwreck.

The next day, after hearing Nerissa's story, Pi asks him to teach him the ocean's ways to confront Troy, but he refuses. Desperate, Pi seeks help from the marlins, but they decline, revealing they once sailed with Nerissa. Thornton also refuses until Pi reminds him of his own embellished story. After Pi protects Nerissa’s pearl from Bart and Eddie attempting to steal it, he finally agrees to train him.

On Pi's first day of training, Pearl voices her deep concern, stating she could not bear it if he were killed. Pi reminds his aunt of her earlier words that he would find his destiny on the reef: Cordelia—and laments that he is losing her as he lost his parents. Though unlike them, he still has a chance to save her. Nerissa guides Pi through a perilous valley filled with hazards: razor-sharp elkhorn coral, burning fire coral a dark tunnel known as Bottleneck Alley, and finally, the West Indies current teeming with dangerous Portuguese man o' war.

Cordelia finds Pi and begs him to reconsider, willing to sacrifice herself for his life. That night, Troy’s henchmen steal Pearl’s cherished pearl, leaving her heartbroken. Determined to confront Troy, Pi continues his training, and on his final day, Pearl expresses her pride in him.

When Troy returns, Pi begins a chase through the valley where Nerissa trained him. Troy crashes into obstacles until he reaches Flat Bottom. Meanwhile, Nerissa and Dylan push Bart and Eddie into a lobster hole to retrieve Pearl’s pearl. Troy slams Pi into a cliff, pinning him and injuring Nerissa. Just when things seem dire, Thornton arrives with the marlins, who apologize for not intervening sooner. Percy and Meg return to rescue Pi, who cleverly leads Troy into a net and narrowly escapes. Trapped, Troy begs for mercy as fishermen pull him from the sea.

The reef’s inhabitants hail Pi as a hero and ridicule Troy, convinced he will become seafood. Nerissa tells Pi he is like a son and presents him with his pearl. Pi offers the pearl to Cordelia, who accepts it, sealing the moment with a kiss as the reef celebrates, including a reformed Bart and Eddie, grateful for their freedom.

In the mid-credits scene, Thornton recounts Pi’s tale to the entire reef, proud to share a true story, concluding, “Pi was determined; he refused to despair. I know it’s all true, for you see, I was there…”

== Voice cast ==
=== English dub ===
- Freddie Prinze, Jr. as Pi (Pisces), an orange Carpenter's flasher wrasse that was orphaned when his parents were caught in a fishing net.
  - Jimmy Bennett plays Young Pi.
- Evan Rachel Wood as Cordelia, a carnation pink angelfish who acts as a model for National Geographic and Pi's love interest.
- Rob Schneider as Nerissa, a widowed loggerhead sea turtle and Pi's mentor.
  - Schneider also voices Bart and Eddie, Troy's henchmen, Bart is a smart barracuda, while Eddie is a dimwitted wolf eel. Schneider also voices other characters like a conch shell, an Indian crab, a lobster, Madge the starfish, and a pelican.
- Donal Logue as Troy, a tiger shark that terrorizes the entire population of the reef. He is Pi's nemesis.
- Andy Dick as Dylan, a teal Elongate surgeonfish and Pi's cousin.
- Fran Drescher as Aunt Pearl, a purple Elongate surgeonfish who is Dylan's widowed mother and Pi's maternal aunt. She is a fortune teller and has a sea star assistant named Madge.
- John Rhys-Davies as Thornton, an elderly storytelling harbor seal.
- R. Lee Ermey as Jack, an overweight marlin.
- Richard Epcar as Moe, an elderly marlin.
- Mel Rodriguez as Manny, a Spanish marlin.
- David Fickas as Max, a French-accented decorator crab who is Cordelia's boss.
- Trent Ford as Percy, a porpoise who is Pi's surrogate brother.
  - Dylan Cash plays Young Percy.
- Megahn Perry as Meg, Percy's mother and Pi's surrogate mother.
- Lena Gleen as Buddy, a flamboyant fiddler crab and Lou's boss.
- Joel Michaely as Lou, a sawfish and Buddy's assistant.
- Bruno Alexander as Pike, Pi's deceased father.
- Reedy Gibbs as Piper, Pi's deceased mother.

=== South Korean cast ===
- Kim Hyung-jun as Pisces ("Pi")
- Im Chae-moo as Nerissa
- Park Myeong-su as Troy
- Kim Kyu-jong as Dylan
- Kim Hyun-joong as a crab and Max
- Park Jung-min as Percy

== Reception ==
The film was panned by critics, and was deemed a rip-off of DreamWorks' Shark Tale and Pixar's Finding Nemo as it heavily borrows from both films along with Disney's The Little Mermaid. Its animation was also deemed poor and outdated.

On Rotten Tomatoes it has 4 reviews, 3 negative, and 1 positive.

eFilmCritic.com's David Cornelius described it as "undoubtedly one of the cheapest, ugliest cartoon features ever produced", criticizing its CGI, graphics, and animation. He also criticized its plot, saying, "the script also rehashes every conceivable cliché in the kid flick book".

Vince Leo from Qwipster's Movie Reviews gave the movie 2 out of 5 stars, saying, "Shark Bait (aka The Reef in some markets) certainly is testing the limits. It's easily the worst CG-animated adventure to date (up to 2007), burdened with lame puns...". He criticized the animation, calling the character designs "lackluster" and the background "overly simplistic".

Louise Keller of Urban Cinefile gave the film a positive review, saying "The Reef" (the alternative title used in some regions) was a much better title than "Shark Bait" and that it was a "colourful and family friendly animated ocean tale".

Tracy Moore of Common Sense Media gave the film two stars out of five, saying that it was "an animated ocean tale has lots of scuffles and bullying."
