= The Reef 2: High Tide =

- South Korean theatrical release poster
- Directed by: Mark A.Z. Dippé; Taedong Park
- Written by: Chris Denk; Johnny Hartmann
- Produced by: Daniel Chuba; Youngki Lee; Ash Shah; Mark A.Z. Dippé
- Starring: Drake Bell; Jamie Kennedy; Rob Schneider
- Edited by: Jim Flynn; Michael Rafferty; Tom Sanders
- Music by: Todd Haberman
- Production company: WonderWorld Studios
- Distributed by: CJ Entertainment (South Korea); Arc Entertainment (United States and Canada); SC Films (International)
- Release dates: October 30, 2012 (United States); January 10, 2013 (South Korea)
- Running time: 80 minutes
- Countries: South Korea; United States
- Languages: Korean; English
- Box office: $8,829,781

The Reef 2: High Tide (Korean: 파이스토리: 악당상어 소탕작전; lit. 'Pi's Story: Operation To Wipe Out The Evil Sharks') is a 2012 animated adventure comedy film and the sequel to 2006's Shark Bait. It was directed and produced by Mark A.Z. Dippé and co-director Taedong Park, and written by Chris Denk and Johnny Hartmann. The English dub stars the same actors as last time, except Freddie Prinze Jr. and Evan Rachel Wood, who are replaced by Drake Bell and Busy Philipps. Although Donal Logue reprised his role as Troy, he replaces John Rhys-Davies as Thornton. Rob Schneider reprised his role as Nerissa, Bart, Eddie, and many more.

A sequel titled Around the World in 80 Days: The Reef 3 is in development.

== Plot ==
Troy is revealed to be alive but imprisoned by the Marines who captured him, locked in a cage and subjected to painful injections. With the help of Ronny, a small, cunning con-artist shark, he manages to escape and sets his sights on revenge against Pi.

Meanwhile, life at the reef has been calm for Pi, who is enjoying fatherhood with no sharks in sight. That peace is shattered when Troy and his gang appear at the reef wall, warning that in four days, the water will rise enough for them to swim over. Nerissa urges Pi to train the other fish to fight, but Troy blackmails Ronny into sabotaging the training efforts in exchange for his freedom. Disguised, Ronny watches the training sessions fall apart and suggests an “underwater extravaganza” to showcase each fish's unique talents and attract human protection. Everyone loves the idea—except Pi. When he confronts Nerissa, the wise turtle wizard hints that Ronny might help reveal something in Pi that he has not allowed to show.

Pi insists he has tried to train the fish, but Nerissa explains that he should help them become their best selves rather than just copies of him. She then reveals the image of the legendary Sea Dragon, a power only the worthy can command.

Pi devises a plan to build a shark trap to launch Troy out to sea, sending two companions for supplies. After setting it up with his son Junior, he assigns Bart and Eddie to guard the cave. However, Ronny overhears the plan and, on Troy’s orders, sabotages the trap by tricking the reef fish into the cave. Bart and Eddie inform Pi, who confronts Ronny, but Cordelia defends Ronny, saying he accepts them as they are. Later, Troy has Ronny lure Cordelia outside the reef and reveals Ronny's true role, shocking her. Although Ronny tries to explain himself, Troy kidnaps Cordelia, sparing Ronny as he no longer finds him useful.

As Pi lies injured amid the wreckage of Nerissa’s ship, a sudden commotion draws attention to Bart and Eddie, who have captured Ronny after revealing his true identity as a shark. Feeling guilty, he confesses that Troy had pressured him and promises to help Pi save Cordelia. Moved by his contrition, the group grants the remorseful dwarf shark a second chance. As Pi struggles to free Cordelia, Ronny boldly steps in to confront the Hench-sharks, encouraging them to turn against their Troy. However, overhearing the betrayal, Troy devours Ronny in anger. Meanwhile, as battle preparations intensify, Nerissa enters a mysterious volcano, where arcane energies swirl around the turtle as he begins the ritual to summon the sea dragon.

Troy and his sharks storm the reef, but many fish cleverly evade them. Troy bites and overpowers Pi; however, before he can finish the job, Nerissa swoops in on his mighty sea dragon, scattering the other sharks. Sneaking up from behind, Troy knocks Nerissa off the dragon, causing it to vanish. Just as he is about to hurt Nerissa, Pi blasts him with a Water Ball, redirecting his focus back to his main rival. Troy chases Pi until Pi, Cordelia, and Junior spring the shark trap, launching him out of the sea and onto a ship. As humans close in on the captured shark, Ronny slips free from Troy’s jaws and back into the water. The humans then give Troy another vaccine, making him howl in pain.

With Troy defeated once again, the fish rejoice, and Nerissa commends Pi for proving himself to be a true leader. Pi and his friends thank Nerissa for risking his life, and the wise turtle responds that it was his “part to play.” Nerissa then joins the celebration, dancing with the fish as a reformed Ronny joins in.

== Voice Cast ==
=== English cast ===
- Drake Bell as Pi, an orange wrasse fish who is the new leader of the reef, Cordelia's husband and Junior's father. He was previously voiced by Freddie Prinze Jr. in the first film.
- Busy Philipps as Cordelia, a carnation pink angelfish who is Pi's wife and Junior's mother. She was previously voiced by Evan Rachel Wood in the first film.
- Frankie Jonas as Pi Jr., a young orange wrasse fish who is the son of Pi and Cordelia.
- Donal Logue as Troy, an evil tiger shark and Pi's archenemy who now has an identity number "Alpha 010", as Ronny calls him. He seeks revenge on Pi for tricking him into going near a massive fishing net. He makes a cameo in Marmaduke. Logue reprised his role from the first film.
  - Logue also voices Thornton, an elderly storytelling harbor seal and a resident of the Reef. He was previously voiced by John Rhys-Davies in the first film.
- Rob Schneider as Nerissa, an old loggerhead sea turtle and Pi's mentor.
  - Schneider also voices Bart and Eddie, Troy's former henchmen who now serve as Pi's personal assistants and sidekicks. Bart is a smart barracuda while Eddie is a dimwitted wolf eel. Schneider also voices other characters like Bud, Doom, a hammerhead shark who is a member of Troy's gang, a lobster, Madge the starfish, Max the French-accented decorator crab, a pelican, and a sea sponge.
- Andy Dick as Dylan, a teal Elongate surgeonfish who is Pi's cousin and Junior's uncle
- Audrey Wasilewski as Aunt Pearl, a purple Elongate surgeonfish who is Dylan's mother, Pi's aunt and Junior's great aunt. She was previously voiced by Fran Drescher in the first film.
- Jamie Kennedy as Ronny, a purple dogfish who was used by Troy to stop Pi's coaching skills.
- Jack Mullins as Navy diver
- Stephen Stanton as Jack, one of the marlins.
- Matthew Willig as Bronson, a great white shark and a member of Troy's gang.
- Eric Lopez as Hector, a bull shark and a member of Troy's gang.
- Neil Ross as Schliemann, a lemon shark and a member of Troy's gang.

== Reception ==
Tracy Moore of Common Sense Media give a rate two stars out of five, saying that the "Sequel is less intense than the original but still menacing." Starburst Magazine's Paul Mount reviewed the film and said that it was "clearly one for the kids with its bright colours and endless knockabout humour, there are a few sly gags and references which might amuse patient adults who are along for the ride and who might otherwise be spending their time glancing at their wristwatches and waiting for the end credits to roll." He also noted that the animation is "rarely better than cheap and cheerful" and voice talents are "not exactly A-list." He gave a rating of five out of ten.
