= Dusty (G.I. Joe) =

Character from the G.I. Joe franchise

- G.I. Joe character
- First appearance: 1985
- Voiced by: Neil Ross (Sunbow/Marvel); Maurice LaMarche (DiC series); Alessandro Juliani (Spy Troops); Andrew Toth (Valor vs. Venom); Joe Zieja (G.I. Joe: Operation Blackout)

In-universe information
- Affiliation: G.I. Joe
- Specialty: Desert Trooper
- File name: Tadur, Ronald W.
- Birth place: Las Vegas, Nevada
- SN: 371-11-4605
- Rank: E-4 (Corporal); E-5 (Sergeant) (1991); E-7 (Sergeant First Class) (2000)
- Primary MOS: Infantry
- Secondary MOS: Refrigeration and Air-Conditioning Maintenance
- Subgroups: Tiger Force; Desert Patrol Squad

Dusty is a fictional character from the G.I. Joe: A Real American Hero toyline, comic books and animated series. He is the G.I. Joe Team's desert trooper and debuted in 1985.

== Profile ==
Dusty's real name is Ronald W. Tadur, which is based on an anagram of Hasbro artist Ron Rudat. Born in Las Vegas, Nevada, he grew up in the desert and became intimately familiar with it. After high school, he worked as a refrigeration repairman by day, while studying the ecology of the desert in his spare time. He went through basic training at Fort Bliss, Texas, and is a qualified expert with the M-14, M-16, M-16A2, M-60, M-1911A1 auto pistol and M-203 40 mm grenade launcher. Dusty is an Army Ranger who specializes in desert warfare and survival.

An excellent tracker, he is fluent in Arabic and Hebrew, conversant in Kazakh and the Oirat-Khalkha languages of Central Asia, and is also noted for his patience, strong leadership qualities, and excellence for sneaking up behind enemies in the desert, and popping a can of firefight. When the G.I. Joe Team was disbanded, Dusty signed up for a tour in Israel, in order to keep his skills sharp. He returned to active duty when the team was reinstated, and can usually be found leading new recruits in target practice.

== Toys ==
Dusty was first released as an action figure in 1985. It sports the chocolate-chip camouflage BDU, and hooded desert headgear. The same figure was recolored, and released as a member of the G.I. Joe subgroup "Tiger Force" in 1988.

A new version of Dusty was released in 1991. Inspired by the Persian Gulf War, this version came packaged with a pet coyote, Sandstorm. He wears a light-yellow shirt and light-yellow pants with brown splotches, and a light-yellow beret. This release also listed Dusty's Rank as Sergeant E-5 but all other releases still list him as E-4. This version was recolored and released in 2000, in a two-pack with Law & Order.

Four different versions of Dusty were released in 2002, the first one packaged with the "Night Rhino" vehicle. The latter three were different colorings of the same design, packaged with the "Sand Razor" vehicle, in a two-pack with Desert Cobra C.L.A.W.S., and in a two-pack with a new version of the Shock Viper.

In 2004, he was released as part of the Toys R Us exclusive "Desert Patrol Squad" set, which also included the figures Ambush, Gung Ho, Snake Eyes, Stalker and Tunnel Rat. He was also released carded in a two-pack with Zartan, as part of the "Valor vs Venom" toyline.

A new version of Dusty was designed and released in 2010, for the "Pursuit of Cobra" toyline.

== Comics ==
=== Marvel Comics ===
In the Marvel Comics G.I. Joe series, he first appears in issue #58 (April 1987). He is teamed up with Mainframe and a local soldier, in order to infiltrate a foreign-based pre-fab Cobra base called a Terror Drome. The local soldier admires Dusty, despising Mainframe's simple computer skills. All three fight their way past many enemies and the man gains an admiration for both Joes.

In G.I. Joe Special Missions #13, Dusty, Outback, Lightfoot and Mangler are sent to destroy a weapons cache in Eastern Africa. Lightfoot is tortured by the local militia and breaks, giving out valuable information. The team is abandoned in the desert by a slightly sympathetic militia member. They accomplish their mission with the fortunate find of a broken jeep's water-filled radiator. Mangler, angry at his own berating of Lightfoot for breaking, saves the rest of the team by causing a crash of pursuing forces. He does not survive. Dusty later goes on a mission with "Tiger Force".

Dusty leads base security for the Joe's new Utah based headquarters, called "The Pit". He leads resistance, when Cobra Python Patrol members attack the base. The Joes manage to capture one Tele-Viper.

Dusty is featured in the "Invasion of Benzheen" storyline. The storyline involves Cobra invading the desert kingdom of Benzheen, and focuses on Dusty's deep friendship with fellow Joe Sneak-Peek. Flashbacks show Sneak-Peek's mother talking with Dusty during a family visit; she asks him to keep an eye on her son. During the Benzheen mission, Cobra forces, including a Range-Viper and Alley Viper, use a civilian to trick Sneak-Peek into a cross-fire and he is badly injured. All the Vipers are later killed. Dusty carries Sneak-Peak's body for many miles back to a temporary G.I. Joe base camp. Stretcher, a Joe medic, says that Sneak-Peek died while Dusty was carrying him.

=== Action Force ===
Dusty is part of the European G.I. Joe continuity called 'Action Force'. He assists a squad of Joes in stopping a Crimson Guard plot to blow up the Eiffel Tower.

=== Devil's Due ===
Dusty returns in the new Joe series published by Devil's Due. Dusty is one of the many veterans to return when G.I. Joe is re-instated to meet the threat of a revived Cobra. He had been spending time in Israel. The veteran Joes meet many new members who are collectively referred to as "Greenshirts". His mission was training new Joe recruits until its second disbandment.

== Animated series ==
=== Sunbow ===
Dusty first appeared in the Sunbow-produced mini-series "The Pyramid of Darkness", and often appeared in the first season. Dusty's air conditioning and refrigeration repair skills were acknowledged in the series. In keeping with his primary duties, he is also able to parlay with local inhabitants of the desert with considerable grace. He was voiced by Neil Ross. Oddly for a character who is supposed to be from Nevada, he speaks with a southern accent, though it is possible that Dusty was only born in Las Vegas and was raised somewhere else. In this series, Dusty's last name is Rudat instead of Tadur.

Dusty had a major role in the episode "Hearts and Cannons". In the episode, he and Footloose jump out of a damaged Joe cargo plane and find themselves in a desert, where Cobra is testing their new Plasma Cannon weapon. They rescue Dr. Nancy Winters, a beautiful scientist who was tricked into designing the Plasma Cannon for Destro, and compete for her affection. While they escape through a dust storm, Dusty holds off Cobra forces and steals a Cobra Stinger. Dusty and Dr. Winters later help Footloose destroy Destro's plasma tank, liberating an Arabian country from Cobra as well. The episode ends with Dusty disappointed at Dr. Winters falling in love with the country's king instead of him.

Dusty's most memorable appearance was in the two-part episode "The Traitor", in which he seemingly accepts help from Tomax and Xamot to pay his mother's medical bills, in exchange for information regarding G.I. Joe's experimental armor formula. In reality, Dusty is under orders from Duke to infiltrate Cobra as a double agent, but before Duke can inform G.I. Joe of this, he is injured and placed in a coma. Dusty is found guilty of treason, but is freed by Cobra agents before being incarcerated. After gaining the trust of Cobra Commander, Dusty is given the task of gassing captured G.I. Joe members with a mind control gas, which he secretly tampers with. As a final act of his loyalty, Dusty instead frees his teammates, and uses the gas to neutralize the Joes' armor treatment.

=== G.I. Joe: The Movie ===
Dusty also appeared briefly in the 1987 animated film G.I. Joe: The Movie. He is part of a unit of Joes led by Roadblock who go after the fleeing Cobra forces after Cobra's first attempt to steal the Broadcast Energy Transmitter (B.E.T.) and become captives of Cobra-La.

=== DiC ===
He appeared again in the DiC-produced G.I. Joe animated series, voiced by Maurice LaMarche.

=== Spy Troops and Valor vs. Venom ===
Dusty appeared in the Reel FX's direct-to-video movie G.I. Joe: Spy Troops voiced by Alessandro Juliani, and in G.I. Joe: Valor vs. Venom voiced by Andy Toth.

== Video games ==
Dusty appears as a non-playable supporting character in the video game G.I. Joe: The Rise of Cobra.
