= Audrey Wasilewski =

American actress

- Occupation: Actress
- Years active: 1994–present
- Website: www.audreywasilewski.com

Audrey Wasilewski is an American television, film and voice actress. She is known for her prolific voice work including Arlene in the Garfield franchise, Stealth Elf in the Skylanders video games, and roles in My Life as a Teenage Robot, Psychonauts 2, Breadwinners, Fallout 3, and Infinity Train.

She has also appeared in a supporting role in several live-action projects, including Mad Men, Big Love, Mosquito State, Fancy Dance, and Everything Everywhere All At Once.

== Career ==
=== Voice over ===
Wasilewski's first role was as Tucker Carbunckle in My Neighbor Was a Teenage Robot in the Nickelodeon anthology Oh Yeah! Cartoons; she would later reprise the role as well as voice Misty, XJ-7 and XJ-8 for the animated series My Life as a Teenage Robot in 2002. She has worked on 3 projects in the Scooby-Doo franchise: Scooby-Doo and the Alien Invaders, Scooby-Doo! Mystery Inc Grasp of the Gnome, and Scooby-Doo! and the Gourmet Ghost. In 2004, she did additional voices for the 1994 Japanese animated film Heisei Tanuki Gassen Ponpoko. She voices a veterinarian named Dr. Glove in Back at the Barnyard. In 2007, opposite Frank Welker she voiced Garfield's love interest Arlene in the animated direct-to-video film Garfield Gets Real, and reprised the character on The Garfield Show. The following year. Wasilewski also voiced Bessie in Random! Cartoons, had a recurring role as Barb in Sym-Bionic Titan, and she also voices Terk in a Tarzan video game. Once again voicing the love interest to a Frank Welker character, she is Ortensia, Oswald the Lucky Rabbit's cat wife in Epic Mickey 2: The Power of Two. League of Assassins member in Batman: Arkham City, Police Chief Rambamboo for Nickelodeon's Breadwinners and characters in Infinity Train, Disney Infinity 3.0 and the Skylanders series.

In 1997, Wasilewski became the official voice of E.T. the Extra-Terrestrial for DreamWorks voicing the iconic alien for various commercials, toys, video games with a debut at Super Bowl XXXIII.

In 2022, Wasilewski began voicing multiple roles on the Disney Junior series Alice's Wonderland Bakery including Alice's cat Dinah, Chamomille the door mouse and Threeanne of Hearts.

=== Film and television ===
In 2008, Wasilewski played the supporting role of Heidi in the feature film Clear Lake, WI, starring Michael Madsen.

In the 2010 film Red, Wasilewski appeared in a cameo alongside Bruce Willis and John Malkovich in which she played a doomed "gun for hire" sent to assassinate them. Also in 2010, she played the character of Deb in the film Lying to be Perfect.

Wasilewski is known for her roles on the drama series Big Love as Pam Martin and on Mad Men as Anita Olson Respola member of the cast earning the Screen Actors Guild Award for Outstanding Ensemble in a Television Drama.

Wasilewski plays Alpha Officer in the 2022 Academy Award-winning film Everything Everywhere All at Once. The Screen Actors Guild Awards honored this cast with Outstanding Ensemble in a Motion Picture.

The award-winning 2022 film North Star, written and directed by PJ Palmer, has Wasilewski starring opposite Colman Domingo, Malcom Gets, Kevin Bacon, and Laura Innes.

Writer/director Filip Jan Rymsza cast Wasilewski as Sally the secretary in his 2020 psychological thriller Mosquito State.

She has made over 100 guest appearances in TV series, such as, 9-1-1, Homecoming, Defending Jacob, Love, Victor, Young Sheldon, Ghosted, Friends, Two and a Half Men, Ally McBeal, George & Leo, Total Security, Saved by the Bell, Party of Five, Diagnosis Murder, State of Grace, The Nightmare Room, Providence, Charmed, Cold Case, ER, General Hospital, Push, The West Wing, Wonderfalls, The Bernie Mac Show, Boston Legal, Scandal, Family Guy, Monk, Mad, The Inside, Without a Trace, and many more.

== Filmography ==
=== Film ===
Year	Title	Role	Notes
2000	Scooby-Doo and the Alien Invaders	Laura	Voice, direct-to-video
2002	Terminal Error	Kathy	
2004	Catch That Kid	Nurse	
2006	Queer Duck: The Movie	Rosie O'Donnell	Voice
2007	Garfield Gets Real	Arlene, Zelda, Betty, Ashley	Voice
2008	3 Pigs and a Baby	Hamlet, Contractor Cow	Voice
2008	Garfield's Fun Fest	Arlene, Zelda, Momma Bear	Voice
2008	The Goldilocks and the 3 Bears Show	Rhonda, Heather, Construction Cow	Voice
2009	Garfield's Pet Force	Arlene, Starlena	Voice
2010	Hesher	Coleen Bolder	
2010	Lying to Be Perfect	Deb	
2010	Red	Businesswoman	
2011	About Fifty	Becky	
2012	Santa Paws 2: The Santa Pups	Dorothy Bright	
2012	The Reef 2: High Tide	Pearl, Shrimps	Voice
2014	The Boxcar Children	Baker's Wife	Voice
2017	Tom and Jerry: Willy Wonka and the Chocolate Factory	Mrs. Gloop	Voice, direct-to-video
2017	A Crooked Somebody	Cynthia	
2018	Lego DC Comics Super Heroes: The Flash	Mayor Wimbley	Voice, direct-to-video
2018	Scooby-Doo! and the Gourmet Ghost	Chef Sue, Librarian	Voice, direct-to-video
2019	DC Showcase: Sgt. Rock	Nurse	Voice, short film
2020	Mosquito State	Sally the Secretary	
2022	Everything Everywhere All at Once	Alpha RV Officer	
2022	Doctor Strange in the Multiverse of Madness	Souls of the Damned	Voice
2023	Fancy Dance	Nancy	

=== Television ===
Year	Title	Role	Notes
1997	Party of Five	Waitress	Episode: "Significant Others"
1997	Saved by the Bell: The New Class	Lucille Schmidlap	Episode: "Boy II Man"
1997	George & Leo	Female Class Member	Episode: "The Baby-Care Class"
1997	Total Security	Lawanda Loris	Episode: "Citizen Canine"
1998	Sunset Beach	Bride	Uncredited, episode: "Episode #1.372"
1998	Push	Gwen Sheridan	Main role
1999	Sabrina the Teenage Witch	Clerk	Episode: "Little Orphan Hilda"
1999	Oh Yeah! Cartoons	Tucker	Voice, episode: "My Neighbor Was A Teenage Robot"
1999	It's Like, You Know...	Woman	Episode: "Summer of '42'"
2000	Party of Five	Mistress Trudy	Episode: "Dog Day After New Year"
2000	Johnny Bravo	Dr. Rachel Levy	Voice, episode: "Biosphere Johnny"
2000	Ally McBeal	Maureen Ringer	Episode: "Sex, Lies and Second Thoughts"
2001	FreakyLinks	Beret Lady	Episode: "Subject: The Harbingers"
2001	Charmed	Natalie	Episode: "Blinded By The Whitelighter"
2001	Even Stevens	Irene Roman	Uncredited, episode: "A Weak First Week"
2001	Diagnosis Murder	Bank Manager	Episode: "No Good Deed"
2001–2002	State of Grace	Sister Margaret / Sister Celine	2 episodes
2002	The Nightmare Room	Nurse	Episode: "My Name is Evil"
2002	Providence	Nurse	Episode: "Smoke and Mirrors"
2002	V.I.P.	Forewoman	Episode: "Valley Wonka"
2002	General Hospital	Sister Dymphna	Episode: "Episode #1.10042"
2002	Lizzie McGuire	Robyn	Episode: "Party Over Here"
2002	The Agency	Female Customer	Episode: "French Kiss"
2002	For the People	Iris Lowell	Episode: "Honor Thy Mother"
2002	7th Heaven	Mrs. Brand	Episode: "Regarding Eric"
2002	ER	Officer Wetterling	Episode: "One Can Only Hope"
2002	The West Wing	Janice Trumbull	Episode: "Arctic Radar"
2002–2006	My Life as a Teenage Robot	Tucker "Tuck" Carbuckle, Misty, XJ-7, XJ-8, various voices	Voice, 37 episodes
2003	Friends	Sarah	Episode: "The One in Barbados Part 1"
2003	Tremors	Rosie Landers	Episode: "A Little Paranoia Among Friends"
2003	Out of Order	Hamster, Plant	Voice, 6 episodes
2003	Monk	Caucasian Nurse	Episode: "Mr. Monk and the Very, Very Old Man"
2004	The Bernie Mac Show	Kathy Alhorn	Episode: "It's Mac-ademic"
2004	Wonderfalls	Cindy Bradley / Yvette LaJimodiere	Episode: "Crime Dog"
2004	NCIS	Shirley Wilkes	Episode: "See No Evil"
2004	Two and a Half Men	Megan	Episode: "Yes, Mosignor"; Voice only
2005	Without a Trace	Olivia Daniels	Episode: "Lone Star"
2005	Cold Case	Sandra Riley 1998	Episode: "Revenge"
2005	Gilmore Girls	Sandra	Episode: "To Live and Let Diorama"
2005	The Inside	Ellen Olsen	Episode: "Everything Nice"
2005	Six Feet Under	Masha	Episode: "The Silence"
2005	Inconceivable	Pam	Episode: "Pilot"
2005	Strong Medicine	Marti	Episode: "Rhythm of the Heart"
2005	Close to Home	Pam	2 episodes
2006	Boston Legal	Traci Carpenter	Episode: "Helping Hands"
2006	Danger Rangers	Julie, Kareen, Denny, Dex	Voice, 2 episodes
2006–2007	Family Guy	Mia Farrow, Rhea Perlman, Bimbo #3, Mrs. Cordray, Timmy Cordray, Lisa Simpson	Voice, 4 episodes
2006–2011	Big Love	Pam Martin	21 episodes
2007	The Wedding Bells	Dr. Pam Fields	Episode: "The Fantasy"
2007	General Hospital: Night Shift	Sondra Minx	Episode: "Bed, Bath and Be Gone"
2007	Pushing Daisies	Madeline McLean	Episode: "Corpsicle"
2007	Random! Cartoons	Bessie	Voice, episode: "Call Me Bessie"
2008	Eli Stone	Emily	Episode: "Father Figure"
2008	Back at the Barnyard	Stage Hand, Dr. Betty, Vet	Voice, 3 episodes
2008	Private Practice	Janet	Episode: "Nothing to Talk About"
2008–2010	Mad Men	Anita Olson Respola	7 episodes
2009	Monk	Gloria Kasinsky	Episode: "Mr. Monk and the Lady Next Door"
2009	Bones	Trysta	Episode: "The Doctor in the Den"
2009	The Mighty B!	Bibi	Voice, episode: "Dragonflies"
2009	Saving Grace	Lita Mae	Episode: "Watch Siggybaby Burn"
2009	10 Things I Hate About You	Carla	Episode: "I Want You to Want Me"
2009–2016	The Garfield Show	Arlene, Gloria, Newscaster	Voice, 30 episodes
2010	Archer	Elke Hubsch	Voice, episode: "Killing Utne"
2010	The Middle	Jody	Episode: "Signals"
2010	Scooby-Doo! Mystery Incorporated	Queen Amanda, Girlfriend, Female Pirate	Voice, episode: "The Grasp of the Gnome"
2010	Grey's Anatomy	Nicole Waldman	Episode: "These Arms of Mine"
2010–2011	Sym-Bionic Titan	Barb	Voice, 3 episodes
2011	Outsourced	H.R. Lady	Episode: "Gupta's Hit & Manmeet's Missus"
2011	Last Man Standing	Kim	Episode: "Good Cop, Bad Cop"
2012	Southland	Doctor	2 episodes
2012	Hart of Dixie	Dotty Sunberg	Episode: "Aliens & Aliases"
2012	Unsupervised	Mrs. Petters, Aimee Savarese	Voice, 2 episodes
2012	Mad	Grammy Norma, Gloria Pritchett, Thelma	Voice, episode: "I Am Lorax / Modern Family Circus"
2012	Scandal	Alison Becker	Episode: "All Roads Lead to Fitz"
2012–2020	Doc McStuffins	Penny, La Donna	Voice, 4 episodes
2012, 2015	The Penguins of Madagascar	Blue Hen	Voice, 2 episodes
2013	The Mindy Project	Lizzy	Episode: "My Cool Christian Boyfriend"
2014	Shameless	Ann Matlock	Episode: "Iron City"
2014	Stalker	Ellen Meyers	Episode: "Pilot"
2014	Over the Garden Wall	Tavern Keeper	Voice, episode: "Songs of the Dark Lantern"
2014–2016	Breadwinners	Rambamboo	Voice, 19 episodes
2014–2017	Clarence	Kellen Kellerman, additional voices	Voice, 9 episodes
2015	Justified	Lorna	Episode: "Collateral"
2015	The Night Shift	Kaylee's Mother	Episode: "Aftermath"
2016	Bunnicula	Cassandra	Voice, episode: "Alligator Tears"
2016	Ben 10	Maxine Sez, Mom	Voice, episode: "Adventures in Babysitting"
2017	Stuck in the Middle	Leo	Voice, episode: "Stuck in a Commercial"
2017	Brooklyn Nine-Nine	Cindy Shatz	Episode: "Cop-Con"
2017	Uncle Grandpa	Additional voices	Voice, episode: "More Director Shorts"
2017	Disjointed	Pete's Mother	Voice, episode: "The Worst"
2017–2018	Miles from Tomorrowland	Miss Baker, Wilo Villagers, Technician Bot, Lodos	Voice, 11 episodes
2018	Lethal Weapon	Helen	Episode: "Double Shot of Baileys"
2018	Corporate	Jill	Episode: "Trademarq"
2018	My Dead Ex	Mary Bloom	4 episodes
2018	American Woman	Anne	Episode: "Changes and The New Normal"
2018	Ghosted	Celeste	Episode: "The Premonition"
2018	Spider-Man	Wake Rider, Gabby Flenkman, Girl #1	Voice, episode: "Rise Above It All"
2018	Criminal Minds	Dr. Jennifer Brentwood	Episode: "Ashley"
2018	The Epic Tales of Captain Underpants	Other Sophie	Voice, recurring role
2019	Guardians of the Galaxy	The Black Vortex	Voice, episode: "Black Vortex"
2019	ctrl alt delete	Gina	3 episodes
2019–present	The Loud House	Geo, Nacho, additional voices	Voice, 5 episodes
2019–2021	Infinity Train	Megan Olsen	Voice, 6 episodes
2019–2020	Rise of the Teenage Mutant Ninja Turtles	Guardsman 2, Yokai Pedicurist, Guardsman 1, Hidden City Police	Voice, 3 episodes
2020	9-1-1	Joan Wallace	S03 E12 "Fools"
2020	Defending Jacob	Jeanine	Episode: "Damage Control"
2020	Homecoming	Officer Donna Posenaz	2 episodes
2020–2021	Good Girls	Jenny	2 episodes
2020–2021	Summer Camp Island	Yeti Nurse / Red Haired Moom	Voice, 2 episodes
2021	Young Sheldon	Joann	Episode: "Pish Posh and a Secret Back Room"
2022	Love, Victor	Biology Teacher	Episode: "Agent of Chaos"
2022	NCIS: Los Angeles	Meredith Huxley	Episode: "Glory of the Sea"
2022–2023	Spidey and His Amazing Friends	Judge	Voice, 2 episodes
2022–2024	Alice's Wonderland Bakery	Dinah, Three Anne Card Guard	Voice, 41 episodes
2023	The Rookie: Feds	Madame Montclairé	Episode: "Burn Run"
2023	S.W.A.T.	Armoured Car Driver	Episode: "Genesis"
2024	Ted	Muriel	Episode: "My Two Dads"
2024	Ark: The Animated Series	Annika, Audience Member	Voice, 2 episodes
2024	High Potential	Glenda Walker	Episode: "Dirty Rotten Scoundrel"
2025–2026	RoboGobo	Marcy, Eunice, Matilda, Lulu, JJ, various voices	Voice, 10 episodes
2025	Wylde Pak	Parrot, Possession Pile, TV Woman	Voice, episode: "Sad, Single, and Stranded"
2025	It's Always Sunny in Philadelphia	Nurse	Episode: "Frank Is In a Coma"
2026	Rock Paper Scissors	Doctor, Lagoon Monster	Voice, episode: "The Bedtime Story"

=== Video games ===
Year	Title	Role	Notes
1999	Disney's Tarzan	Terk	
2000	Mickey Mouse Preschool	Customers	
2007	Spider-Man: Friend or Foe	Black Cat	
2008	Fallout 3	Tulip, Greta, Carol	
2009	Are You Smarter Than a Fifth Grader? Game Time	Female Contestant	
2009	Dragon Age: Origins	Nesiara / Robbed Elf Woman	
2010	Clash of the Titans	Cassiopeia, Enyo, Spirits	
2010	Epic Mickey	Ortensia	
2011	Knights Contract	Trendula	
2011	L.A. Noire	Jennifer Horgan	
2011	Captain America: Super Soldier	Madame Hydra	
2011	Might & Magic Heroes VI	Airini	
2012	Epic Mickey 2: The Power of Two	Ortensia	
2012	Resistance: Burning Skies	Minutemen, Civilians	
2012	Skylanders: Giants	Stealth Elf	
2013	Skylanders: Swap Force	Stealth Elf	
2014	Skylanders: Trap Team	Stealth Elf, Head Rush	
2014	Lightning Returns: Final Fantasy XIII	Additional Voices	English dub
2015	Minecraft: Story Mode	Em	
2015	Skylanders: SuperChargers	Stealth Elf, Head Rush	
2015	Fallout 4	Alexis Combes, Darcy Pembroke, Female Child of Atom	
2015	Lego Dimensions	E.T.	
2016	Skylanders: Imaginators	Stealth Elf, Head Rush	
2017	Horizon Zero Dawn: The Frozen Wilds	Laura Vogel	
2018	The Elder Scrolls Online: Summerset	Jurisreeve Lorne, Courtier Vindilween	
2019	Kingdom Hearts III	Additional Voices	English dub
2021	Psychonauts 2	Nona Aquato, HQ Receptionist	
2021	Mass Effect Legendary Edition	Kate Bowman	
2023	Disney Speedstorm	Ortensia	
2026	Grand Theft Auto VI	The Local Population	

=== Radio ===
Year	Title	Role	Notes
2005–present	Adventures in Odyssey	Katrina Meltsner	58 episodes
