= Neil Ross =

British actor

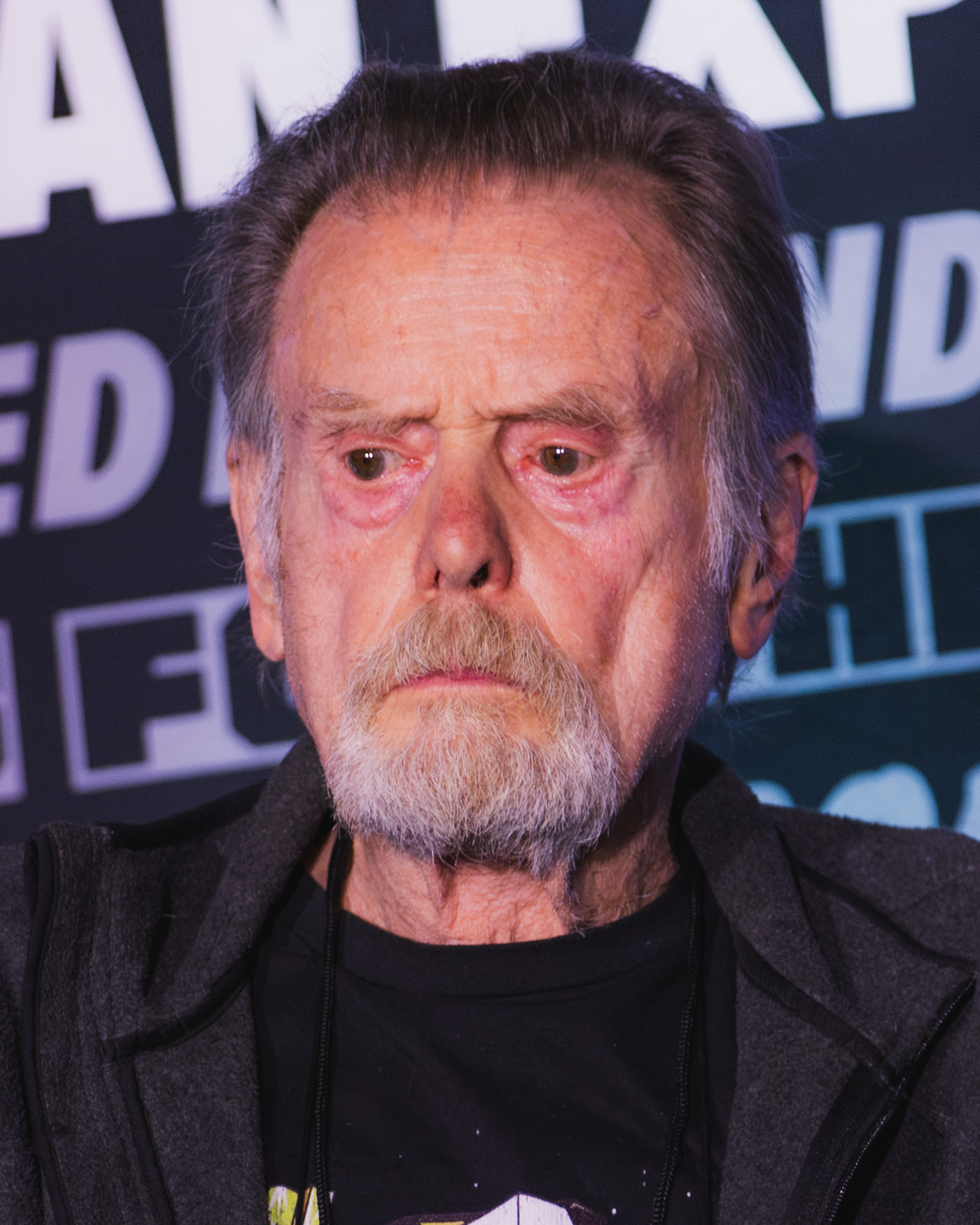
- Ross in 2026
- Born: London, England
- Occupations: Actor; announcer
- Years active: 1978–present
- Children: 1
- Website: www.neilross.com

Neil Ross is a British actor. Noted for his Trans-Atlantic accent, he has provided voices in many American cartoons, most notably G.I. Joe, Spider-Man: The Animated Series, My Life as a Teenage Robot, Voltron, and Transformers, as well as video games. Ross has also provided voice roles (such as radio announcers) for many movies, including Back to the Future Part II, Babe, and Quiz Show. He served as announcer for ABC's prime time revival of the classic game show Press Your Luck from 2019 to 2023, as well as the voice of its villainous character The Whammy.

Ross was the co-announcer for the 75th Annual Academy Awards Telecast in 2003, and the announcer for the 56th Annual Prime Time Emmy Awards Telecast in 2004. He has also narrated numerous episodes of A&E's Biography, and many editions of NOVA on PBS (including Mars – Dead or Alive, which was nominated for an Emmy Award in 2004).

== Early life ==
Ross was born in London, England. He was subsequently raised in Montreal, Quebec, Canada. His family relocated to California when he was 12 years old, eventually settling in San Diego.

== Career ==
=== Radio ===
Ross started working in radio when he finished school. His first station was KMUR in Salt Lake City, Utah. Following this, he moved on to KORL, KGMB and KKUA in Honolulu, Hawaii, before moving to KCBQ in San Diego in 1969. He stayed in California, working on KYA San Francisco and KMPC Los Angeles. He made his last broadcast in 1985.

=== Voice acting ===
He began his voice-over work in 1978 when he moved to Los Angeles. His first role was as a salesman in an episode of Richie Rich for Hanna-Barbera. Ross has voiced radio and television commercials for companies including Wal-Mart, AT&T, Volkswagen, Coca-Cola, Mattel, Goodyear, Disney, Hoover, Anheuser-Busch, Southwest Airlines, and Kellogg's, and has done promo work for CBS, NBC, ABC, TBS and Fox Kids, using an American accent in all of his performances. For five years he was the promotional announcer for Game Show Network.

Ross voiced the Green Green/Norman Osborn in Spider-Man: The Animated Series, Shipwreck, Buzzer, Monkeywrench, Dusty, Thunder, and Heavy Metal in G.I. Joe: A Real American Hero, and Commander Keith and Pidge in Voltron: Defender of the Universe. In The Transformers, he voiced Springer, Hook, Slag, and Bonecrusher, reprising these roles in The Transformers: The Movie (1986).

=== Announcing and narration ===
Ross served as co-announcer on the 75th Annual Academy Awards telecast in March 2003 and as announcer on the 56th Annual Prime Time Emmy Awards telecast in September 2004. He narrated numerous episodes of A&E's Biography and many editions of NOVA for PBS.

In 2019, Ross became the announcer and voice of the Whammy character for the ABC primetime revival of Press Your Luck, hosted by Elizabeth Banks. He served in this role for four seasons until 2023.

== Filmography ==
=== Animation ===
Year	Title	Role	Notes	References
1982–84	Pac-Man	Clyde	19 Episodes	
1983–86	G.I. Joe	"Buzzer", "Dusty", "Heavy Metal", "Monkeywrench", "Shipwreck", "Thunder"	Unknown episodes	
1984–85	Voltron	Keith / Jeff / Pidge / Chip / Prince Bandor	Unknown episodes	
1984–87	The Transformers	Bonecrusher, Hook, Springer, Slag, Sixshot, Pointblank, Fracas	Unknown episodes	
1985–92	Cap'n O. G. Readmore	Cap'n O. G. Readmore	Animated specials only	
1985–86	Jem	Howard Sands, Hector Ramirez	Unknown episodes	
1985–86	Hulk Hogan's Rock 'n' Wrestling	Mean Gene Okerlund	26 episodes	
1985–88	Kissyfur	Duane the Pig	26 episodes	
1985–95	Robotix	Jerrok / Flexor / Gaxon / Steggor	Unknown episodes	
1986	Galaxy High	Rotten Roland	13 episodes	
1986	Inhumanoids	Herc Armstrong, Tank, Ssslither, Sabre Jet, Ronald Reagan, Hector Ramirez	Unknown episodes	
1986	Rambo: The Force of Freedom	John J. Rambo	65 episodes	
1986	The Centurions	Ace McCloud	Unknown episodes	
1987	Bionic Six	F.L.U.F.F.I.	Unknown episodes	
1987	The Little Troll Prince	Prag No. 1	Television special	
1987	Visionaries: Knights of the Magical Light	Leoric	Unknown episodes	
1987	Spiral Zone	Overlord, Wolfgang 'Tank' Schmidt	Unknown episodes	
1988–94	Garfield and Friends	Jon's cousin, Paco, announcer		
1989	X-Men: Pryde of the X-Men	Nightcrawler	Television pilot	
1990–91	Attack of the Killer Tomatoes: The Animated Series	Whitley White	Unknown episodes	
1990–91	Zazoo U	Logan Chomper	Unknown episodes	
1991–93	The Legend of Prince Valiant	Duncan Draconarius	Unknown episodes	
1991–99	Little Dracula	Maggot	Unknown episodes	
1991	Yo Yogi!	Baba Looey	Unknown episodes	
1991–2004	Rugrats	Professor, Western Union Man, Scientist, Santa Claus, Announcer, Clerk, Clown, Mr. Namby, Reporter, President, Dr. Ventnor, The Changeling, F. Lee Barnum, Judge, Press, Various TV Announcers, Fisherman, Policeman, Prince	11 episodes	
1992–93	Wild West C.O.W.-Boys of Moo Mesa	Bat Blastagun	Unknown episodes	
1992–94	Batman: The Animated Series	Dealer, Ratso, Jake	The Cat and the Claw: Part I, The Cat and the Claw: Part II, Pretty Poison, Harley and Ivy, Birds of a Feather, Read My Lips, Harlequinade	
1993	Secret Squirrel	Morocco Mole	Unknown episodes	
1993–94	SWAT Kats: The Radical Squadron	Mac Mange	5 episodes	
1994	Fantastic Four	Puppet Master, Super-Skrull (Season 1)	Unknown episodes	
1994–96	Iron Man	Fin Fang Foom, Wellington Yinsen, Blizzard	Unknown episodes	
1995–97	The Mask: The Animated Series	Lt. Kellaway, Sly Eastenegger	Unknown episodes	
1995	Freakazoid!	Board Member	Episode: "The Chip: Part 1"	
1995–98	Spider-Man: The Animated Series	Norman Osborn/Green Goblin	Unknown episodes	
1995–98	Pinky and the Brain	Marvin the Martian	Unknown episodes	
1995–96	The Adventures of Hyperman	Narrator	13 episodes	
1996	Mortal Kombat: Defenders of the Realm	Shang Tsung		
2000	Oh Yeah! Cartoons	Al, Pirate	Ep. Sick 'n' Tired in Bug Bite!	
2000–07	Harvey Birdman, Attorney at Law	Vulturo	Unknown episodes	
2003–09	My Life as a Teenage Robot	Dr. Phineas Mogg, Redneck, Barber, Monitor Voice, Special Agent #1	Unknown episodes	
2003–05	Jakers! The Adventures of Piggley Winks	Mr. McGandry, Mr. O'Hopper	Unknown episodes	
2004	The Adventures of Jimmy Neutron: Boy Genius	Announcer	Episode: "The Junkman Cometh"	
2007	Ben 10	Wainwright, Guard #2, Radio Chatter #1	Ep. "Ben 4 Good Buddy"	
2010–13	Planet Sheen	Helmb		
2012	The Avengers: Earth's Mightiest Heroes	William Cross / Crossfire, Thug 1, Security Guard	Ep. "To Steal an Ant-Man"	
2012–13	Kung Fu Panda: Legends of Awesomeness	Constable Hu	7 episodes	
2017	Be Cool, Scooby-Doo!	Scrooge, Symposium Head	Ep. "Scroogey Doo"	

=== Live action ===
- Press Your Luck – Announcer / Whammy (voice)
- Superhuman Samurai Syber-Squad – Skorn ("His Master's Voice", "An Un-Helping Hand", "Loose Lips Sink Microchips"), Stupid Virus ("Cheater, Cheater, Megabyte Eater") (voices)

=== Movies ===
- Lifepod (1981) – Main Cerebral (voice)
- The Transformers: The Movie (1986) – Bonecrusher / Hook / Springer / Slag (voice)
- An American Tail (1986) – Honest John (voice)
- G.I. Joe: The Movie (1987) – Buzzer / Dusty / Monkeywrench / Shipwreck (voice)
- Innerspace (1987) – Pod Computer (voice)
- Little Nemo: Adventures in Slumberland (1989) – Oompa (voice)
- Back to the Future Part II (1989) – Biff Tannen Museum Narrator (voice)
- Dick Tracy (1990) – Radio Announcer #3 (voice)
- Gremlins 2: The New Batch (1990) – Announcer (voice)
- The Little Engine That Could (1991, Short) – Doc / Control Tower / Handy Pandy (voice)
- FernGully: The Last Rainforest (1992) – Elder (voice)
- The Town Santa Forgot (1993) – Pout the Elf (voice)
- Batman: Mask of the Phantasm (1993) – (voice)
- Thumbelina (1994) – Mr. Bear / Mr. Fox (voice)
- A Troll in Central Park (1994) – Pansy (voice)
- Quiz Show (1994) – Twenty-One Announcer
- The Pebble and the Penguin (1995) – Scrawny (voice)
- Babe (1995) – (voice)
- The Secret of NIMH 2: Timmy to the Rescue (1998) – Doctor Valentine's assistant
- Scooby-Doo! and the Witch's Ghost (1999) – Mayor Corey (voice)
- Scooby-Doo and the Alien Invaders (2000) – Sergio (voice)
- It's the Pied Piper, Charlie Brown (2000, TV Movie) – Interviewer (voice)
- The SpongeBob SquarePants Movie (2004) – Cyclops Diver (voice)
- Son of the Mask (2005) – Deep Alvey Avery (voice)
- Tom and Jerry: The Fast and the Furry (2005) – Dr. Professor (voice)
- The Ant Bully (2006) – Wasp #1 / Wasp #5 (voice)
- Codename: Kids Next Door - Operation Z.E.R.O. (2006) – Grandfather (voice)
- Garfield Gets Real (2007) – Wally / Charles (voice)
- Dragonlance: Dragons of Autumn Twilight (2008) – Fizban / Paladine (voice)
- Garfield's Pet Force (2009) – Wally / Charles (voice)
- The Outback (2012) – Monty (voice)
- The Reef 2: High Tide (2012) – Schliemann (voice)

=== Video games ===
- Call of Duty – Announcer, Narrator
- Command & Conquer: Renegade – Additional Voices
- Command & Conquer: Generals – Additional Voices
- Disney Universe – VIC
- Doom 3 – Sergeant Kelly
- Eternal Darkness: Sanity's Requiem – Dr. Edwin Lindsey
- Final Fantasy VII Remake – Mayor Domino
- Legacy of Kain – Malek the Paladin, King Ottmar, Elzevir the Dollmaker, Rahab
- Leisure Suit Larry 6: Shape Up or Slip Out! – Narrator
- Leisure Suit Larry: Love for Sail! – Narrator
- Metal Gear Solid 2: Sons of Liberty – Navy SEAL
- Metal Gear Solid 3: Snake Eater – Colonel Volgin
- Monkey Island 2 Special Edition: LeChuck's Revenge – Wally B. Feed
- The Curse of Monkey Island – Wally B. Feed
- Ninja Gaiden – Murai
- Onimusha 3 – Guildenstern
- Onimusha Blade Warriors – Guildenstern
- RAGE 2 – Dr. Kvasir, Wellspring Guard
- Return to Monkey Island – Wally B. Feed
- Revenant – Sardok, Verhoevan, Townsmen
- Rosewater – Doc Sedgwick, Oberlin, Quentin Ellis, Perry Cloud Smith, Buford, Roderick Nethersole
- Spyro: Year of the Dragon – Moneybags, Bentley
- Spyro: Enter the Dragonfly – Moneybags
- Spider-Man 3 – Luke Carlyle
- Star Wars: Rogue Squadron – Han Solo, General Rieekan
- Star Wars: Rebellion – Han Solo, Stormtrooper, Imperial Command Center Communications Officer
- Star Wars: X-Wing Alliance – Admiral Nammo, Concourse PA Announcer, Imperial Officer, Rebel Pilot
- The Bard's Tale – Additional voices
- Vampire: The Masquerade – Bloodlines – Gary Golden
