= Jennifer Darling =

American actress (born 1946)

- Born: Joan Darling; June 19, 1946 (age 80); Pittsburgh, Pennsylvania, U.S.
- Education: Carnegie Institute of Technology
- Occupation: Actress
- Years active: 1960–2017
- Known for: The Six Million Dollar Man; The Bionic Woman
- Children: 1

Jennifer Darling (born Joan Darling; June 19, 1946) is an American retired actress. Her best-known role on screen was as Peggy Callahan in The Six Million Dollar Man and its spin-off The Bionic Woman. In animation, she voiced Irma Langenstein on the original Teenage Mutant Ninja Turtles. In anime, she is the voice of Ayeka in the English dub of Tenchi Muyo! for most of the English adaptions. She provided additional voices in A Bug's Life, Tarzan, The Iron Giant, The Emperor's New Groove, Spirited Away, Monsters, Inc., and Treasure Planet.

== Early life ==
Born on June 19, 1946, and a native of Pittsburgh, Pennsylvania, Darling began taking dancing classes when she was 3 years old. She sang and danced on The Original Amateur Hour when she was 14. While she attended Carnegie Tech, she met Paul Itkin, and they married before they graduated. They have a daughter. She was born Joan Darling, but she had to change her name for professional purposes because another actress named Joan Darling had already registered that name with Actors' Equity Association.

== Filmography ==
=== Anime ===
- Astro Boy – Nora
- Blood+ – Ms. Lee
- Hello Kitty – Mama
- Tenchi Muyo! series – Ayeka Masaki Jurai, Tokimi (OVA 2)

=== Animation (non-anime) ===
- Aladdin – Hippsodeth
- MoonDreamers – DreamGazer
- Annabelle's Wish – Star
- Bump in the Night – The Cute Dolls
- Bionic Six – Madame O
- Capitol Critters – Berkeley
- Care Bears: Welcome to Care-a-Lot – Grams Bear
- Dink, The Little Dinosaur – Ariel the Parasaurolophus
- The Centurions – Amber
- Christmas in Tattertown – Muffet
- Darkwing Duck – Dr. Rhoda Dendron
- The Dukes - Additional Voices (Season 1)
- Foofur - Additional Voices
- Galaxy High – Booey Bubblehead, Mertyl Blastermeier, Wendy Garbo
- G.I. Joe: The Movie – Pythona
- Hound Town – Muffin
- James Bond Jr. - Additional Voices
- Mighty Orbots – Dia
- Visionaries: Knights of the Magical Light – Virulina, Fletchen
- Space Cats - Additional voices
- The Gary Coleman Show – Angelica
- The Grim Adventures of Billy & Mandy – Miss Holly Pollywinkle
- Iron Man – Scarlet Witch
- Poochie – Koom
- Rugrats – Hat Kid
- The Smurfs – Princess Sabina
- TaleSpin – Mrs. Snarly
- Teenage Mutant Ninja Turtles – Irma Langenstein
- Trollkins – Pixlee Trollsom, Deputroll Dolly
- The Biskitts – Wiggle
- The Mask: Animated Series - Additional Voices
- The Tick – Mynda
- Where's Waldo? – Additional Voices

=== Live-action ===
- The Secret Storm – Irene (1970–71)
- The Six Million Dollar Man – Peggy Callahan (4 episodes, 1975–76)
- The Bionic Woman – Peggy Callahan (7 episodes, 1976–78)
- The Incredible Hulk (Episode: "Never Give a Trucker an Even Break") – Joanie
- Eight Is Enough – Donna (19 episodes, 1977–80)
- The New Adventures of Wonder Woman (Episode: "Death in Disguise") – Violet Louise Tree, 1978
- The Fall Guy (Episode: Wheels S03E12) - Mary Jo
- You Are There – Peggy Arnold
- Mad About You – Mrs. Bluestone, aka Marvin's Mom. 1999

=== Film ===
- Aladdin – Arabian Woman
- An American Tail: Fievel Goes West - Female Mice #2
- Beauty and the Beast – French Woman #3
- Brother Bear - Female Bear
- A Bug's Life - Female Ants, Fly Mom
- Garfield Gets Real – Bonita, Bobby, Rusty, Mother
- Happily N'Ever After - Additional voices
- Lilo & Stitch - Female Officer
- Hercules - Woman pointing at Young Hercules
- Little Nemo: Adventures in Slumberland – Nemo's Mother
- Madagascar - Crowd Member
- Monsters, Inc. – Female Monster
- Atlantis: The Lost Empire - Queen Kashem Nedakh
- Ponyo - Additional voices (English dub)
- Porco Rosso – Additional voices (English dub)
- Roadside Romeo — Additional voices
- Kaena: The Prophecy – Reya (English dub)
- Spirited Away – Additional voices (English dub)
- Spirit: Stallion of the Cimarron – Female Horse 3
- Tarzan – Female Gorilla #2
- The Emperor's New Groove – Female Villager #1
- The Hunchback of Notre Dame – Woman #3
- The Iron Giant - Woman
- The Little Mermaid - Female Mermaid
- Toy Story - Additional voices
- Toy Story 2 - Additional voices
- Treasure Planet - Female Alien

=== Video games ===
- Baldur's Gate – Shar-Teel Dosan, Kaishas
- Final Fantasy Type-0 HD - Commissar
- King's Quest VIII: The Mask of Eternity – Lady of the Lake, Swamp Wisp, Unicorn/Ugly Beast
- Leisure Suit Larry: Love for Sail! – Victorian/Vikki Principles
