= Stephen Stanton =

American voice actor

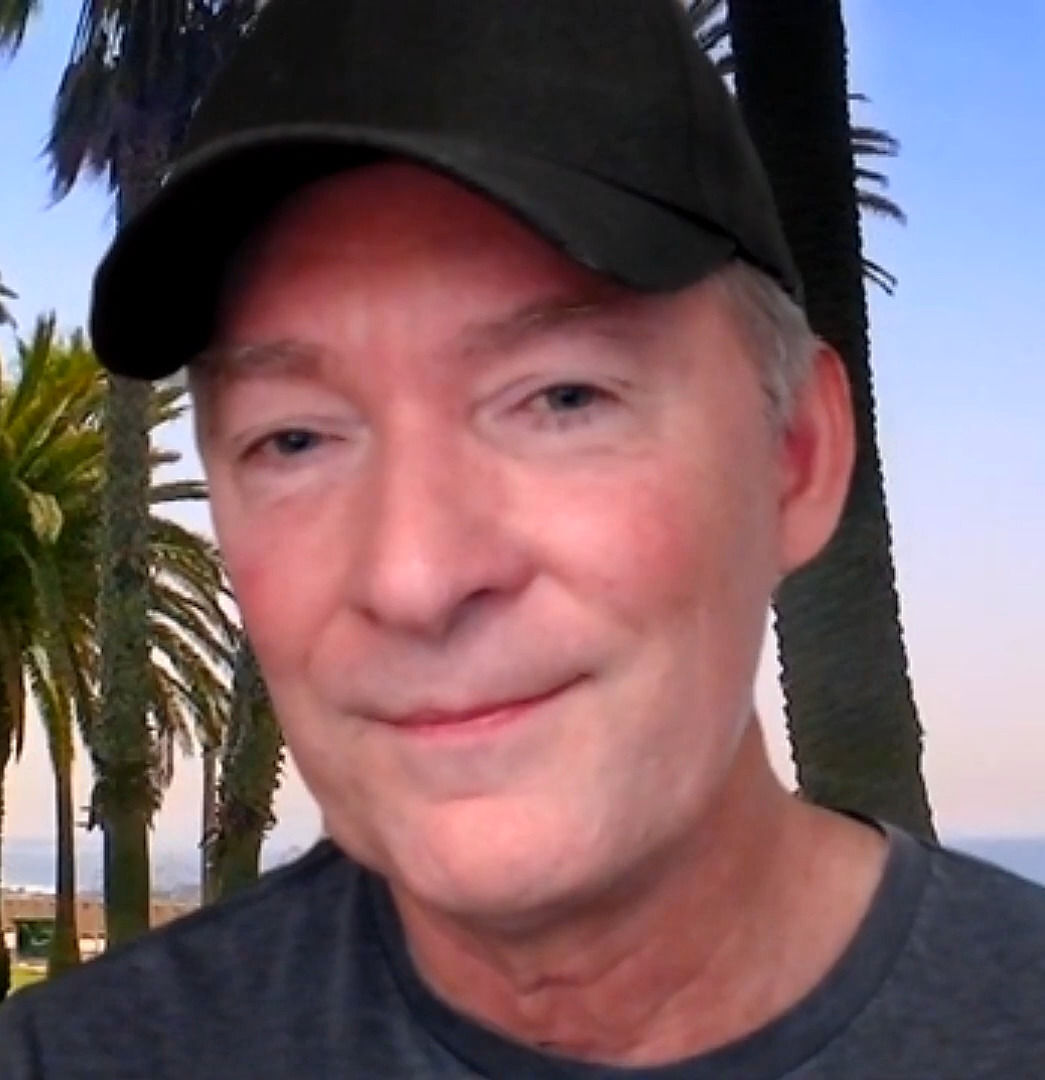
- Stanton in 2022
- Born: Stephen Walter Stanton
- Other names: Steven Stanton; Steven W. Stanton
- Occupations: Voice actor; visual effects artist
- Years active: 1985–present
- Website: www.stephenstanton.com

Stephen Walter Stanton is an American voice actor and visual effects artist. His roles include Sasha Nein in Psychonauts and Psychonauts 2, Grand Moff Tarkin in the Star Wars franchise, Ben Kenobi in Star Wars Rebels (for the episode "Twin Suns"), Admiral Raddus in Rogue One and Griff Halloran on Star Wars Resistance.

== Career ==
Stanton is well-known as a voice double for Tim Allen, Nicolas Cage, John Cusack, Peter Cushing, Robert Downey Jr., Roger Ebert, Jeff Goldblum, Alec Guinness, Clive Owen, Vincent Schiavelli and Bruce Willis, among others. He also provides original voices for Disney television series and theme park attractions.

He voiced Admiral Tarkin and Mas Amedda in Star Wars: The Bad Batch.

== Filmography ==
=== Film ===
Year	Title	Role	Notes
2000	Titan A.E.	Colonist, Alien Prisoner	
2004	Starship Troopers 2: Hero of the Federation	FedNet	Direct-to-video
2004	Pink Five Strikes Back	Obi-Wan Kenobi	Short film
2005	Sith Apprentice	Yoda	Short film
2006	Return of Pink Five	Yoda	Short film
2008	Garfield's Fun Fest	Randy Rabbit, Stanislavsky	Direct-to-video
2009	Imagine That	Additional Voice-Over	Uncredited
2009	Garfield's Pet Force	Randy, News Guy, Skinny Guard	Direct-to-video
2010	Secretariat	Triple Crown Race Announcer	Uncredited
2010	Yogi Bear	Additional Voice-Over	Uncredited
2011	The Green Hornet	Breaking News Announcer	Uncredited
2011	Mr. Popper's Penguins	Security Guard	Uncredited
2011	Trespass	Additional Voices	
2012	Foodfight!	Mr. Clean, Lord Flushington, Additional Voices	
2012	Superman vs. The Elite	Bialyian Ambassador, Cartoon Superman, Manchester Black's Father	Direct-to-video
2012	The Amazing Spider-Man	Additional Voices	Uncredited
2012	Total Recall	Additional Voices	Uncredited
2012	Looper	Additional Voices	
2012	The Reef 2: High Tide	Jack	
2012	Playing for Keeps	Additional Voices	Uncredited
2013	47 Ronin	Additional Voices	Uncredited
2014	Life Itself	Roger Ebert	Documentary
2014	Godzilla	Muto Team Member, Soldier	Uncredited
2014	Unbroken	Olympics Radio Announcer	
2015	My All American	Play-by-Play Broadcaster	Uncredited
2016	Get a Job	Additional Voices	Uncredited
2016	Rogue One	Admiral Raddus	Played on-set by Paul Kasey
2017	All About the Money	Voice Over	
2017	The Dark Tower	Rat Man	Uncredited
2018	The Boxcar Children: Surprise Island	Captain Daniel	
2018	Bad Times at the El Royale	J. Edgar Hoover	Uncredited
2019	Joker	Gotham City Health Commissioner, GCR Radio Announcer	Uncredited
2021	The Guilty	Additional Voices	
2022	Tom and Jerry: Cowboy Up!	Virgil, Prairie Dog Dad	Direct-to-video
2022	Marmaduke	King Tut	Netflix film
2024	Wicked	Fiyero's Horse (voice)	

=== Television ===
Year	Title	Role	Notes
2005–present	Robot Chicken	Various Voices	
2006	Medium	Monkeyheads	Ep. "Four Dreams (Part I and II)"
2007	All Grown Up!	Mantooth, Mr. Plank, Announcer	Ep. "Super Hero Worship"
2007–2017	Family Guy	Various	
2008	Seth MacFarlane's Cavalcade of Cartoon Comedy	Jeff Goldblum	Ep. "Jeff Goldblum Wafers"
2008–2009	Wolverine and the X-Men	Fred Dukes / Blob, William Drake	
2009	Random! Cartoons	Frank	Ep. "Mr. Flavio"
2009	King of the Hill	Heck Dorland	Ep. "Born Again on the Fourth of July"
2010	Black Panther	Klaw	
2010–2012	Hero Factory	Jimi Stringer	
2010–2013	Mad	Various Voices	
2010–2020	Star Wars: The Clone Wars	Wilhuff Tarkin, Moralo Eval, Meebur Gascon, various characters	
2010, 2016	Archer	Captain Lammers, Ken Hinkins, Narrator	
2011	G.I. Joe: Renegades	Tomax and Xamot	
2011	It's Always Sunny in Philadelphia	Barry	Ep. "The Gang Gets Trapped"
2012	Parks and Recreation	Political Ad Announcer	Ep. "Campaign Shake-Up"
2012	Doc McStuffins	Gustav	Ep. "Gulpy Gulpy Gators!/One Note Wonder"
2013	The Legend of Korra	Air Lion Turtle, Old Wan	Ep. "Beginnings, Part 2"
2013	Raising Hope	Voiceover, Narrator	
2014	Kirstie	Tony Award Announcer	Ep. "When They Met"
2014	Girl Meets World	Frank Mantucci	Ep. "Girl Meets Father"
2014	Sofia the First	Jade Jaguar	Ep. "Princess to the Rescue!"
2014	Grumpy Cat's Worst Christmas Ever	Jojo the Dog	Television film
2014–2016	The 7D	Sleepy	
2015	Tosh.0	Football Radio Announcer	Ep. "High School Football Fan"
2015	Halt and Catch Fire	Commercial Announcer	Ep. "SETI"
2015–2016	Breadwinners	Judge Pobun, Helmsman Rock, Mr. Chert	
2015–2018	Star Wars Rebels	AP-5, Grand Moff Tarkin, Ben Kenobi	
2016–2018	Bunnicula	Knight Owl	2 episodes
2016	All the Way	Newscaster, Convention Announcer	Television film
2016	Stuck in the Middle	Man vs. Dumpster Announcer	Ep. "Stuck with My Sister's Boyfriend"
2016–2021	The Tom and Jerry Show	Rick, Muscles Mouse, Uncle Pecos, others	Replacing Jason Alexander
2016–2018	Lost In Oz	Chief Advisor Scarecrow, Xandort	
2017	Disjointed	Narrator	
2017	Hey Arnold!: The Jungle Movie	Pigeon Man	Television film
2018	Supernatural	Cosgood Creeps	Ep. "Scoobynatural"
2018–2020	Star Wars Resistance	Griff Halloran, Namua	
2020	Tacoma FD	Pipey	Ep. "A Christmas Story"
2020	Scooby-Doo and Guess Who?	Various	
2021–2024	Star Wars: The Bad Batch	Admiral Tarkin	
2021–2024	Monsters at Work	Smitty, Needleman	Replacing Dan Gerson
2021	Tom and Jerry in New York	Additional Voices	
2021–2023	Looney Tunes Cartoons	Pete Puma, Baby Bear	
2022	The Book of Boba Fett	Pyke Traveler	Uncredited; Ep. "Chapter 2: The Tribes of Tatooine"
2022	Cyberpunk: Edgerunners	Additional Voices	English dub
2022	Oddballs	Chef Throgbort	Ep. "Line Cutters"
2022	American Dad!	John Cena	Ep. "Jambalaya"
2025	Andor	Admiral Raddus	Ep. "Jedha, Kyber, Erso"

=== Video games ===
Year	Title	Role	Source
2003	Tales of Symphonia	Maxwell	
2003	The Lord of the Rings: The Return of the King	Uruk-Hai Warriors	
2004	The Bard's Tale	Additional Voices	
2004	EverQuest II	Hunter Vannil, Bartender Coppershot, Galenus Vafia, Rori	
2004	Armies of Exigo	Ancient One, Giant, Knight, Demon, Ogre, Orc	
2004	The Lord of the Rings: The Battle for Middle-earth	Legolas	
2005	Psychonauts	Sasha Nein, Bonita Soleil	
2005	Madagascar	Melman, Wilbur	
2005	Madagascar Animal Trivia	Melman	
2005	Rogue Galaxy	Alekt Rosencaster, Robert	
2005	Star Wars: Battlefront II	Alliance Officer #1, Ben Kenobi, Darth Maul	
2005	The Matrix: Path of Neo	Agent Jackson, Doberman, Police, Security	
2005	Gun	Alhambra Barkeeper	
2005	The Outfit	Hans von Back	
2006	Star Wars: Empire at War	Obi-Wan Kenobi, Captain Wedge Antilles	
2006	The Lord of the Rings: The Battle for Middle-earth II	Legolas	
2006	Over the Hedge	RJ, Ozzie	
2006	Pirates of the Caribbean: Dead Man's Chest	Admiral James Norrington	
2006	Saints Row	Radio Voice	
2006	Hot Shots Tennis	Big Chief	
2006	Destroy All Humans! 2	Agent Sergi, Blisk, Additional Voices	
2006	Spider-Man: Battle for New York	Kingpin	
2006	Jeanne d'Arc	Prince Charles VII	
2007	Spider-Man 3	Additional Voices	
2007	Pirates of the Caribbean: At World's End	Admiral James Norrington	
2007	Fantastic Four: Rise of the Silver Surfer	Additional Voices	
2007	BioShock	Big Daddy	
2007	Conan	Additional Voices	
2007	Disney Princess: Enchanted Journey	Happy	
2007	Guitar Hero III: Legends of Rock	Additional Voices	
2007	Mass Effect	Additional Voices	
2008	Harvey Birdman: Attorney at Law	Phil Ken Sebben	
2008	Iron Man	Iron Man, Pilot, Engineer, Afghan Soldier	
2008	Boom Blox	Additional Voices	
2008	The Incredible Hulk	Iron Man, Male Pedestrian #2	
2008	Madagascar: Escape 2 Africa	Melman	
2009	Cars Race-O-Rama	Tater	
2009	Brütal Legend	Fire Barons, Glitter Fist	
2009	Madagascar Kartz	Melman	
2010	Kingdom Hearts: Birth by Sleep	Happy, Deep Space System	
2010	Toy Story 3: The Video Game	Stinky Pete the Prospector, Additional Voices	
2010	BioShock 2	Big Daddy	
2011	Warhammer 40,000: Space Marine	Malus Darkblade	
2011	Kinect: Disneyland Adventures	Additional Voices	
2012	Madagascar 3: The Video Game	Melman	
2012	Warhammer Online: Wrath of Heroes	Malus	
2012	Epic Mickey 2: The Power of Two	Scurvy Pat, Paulie, Blue Gremlin	
2013	The Cave	The Cave, Shopkeeper	
2013	Lego Marvel Super Heroes	Blob, Malekith the Accursed, Sentinel	
2014	BioShock Infinite: Burial at Sea	Big Daddy	
2015	Disney Infinity 3.0	Ben Kenobi	
2015	StarCraft II: Legacy of the Void	Mal'ash, Kaldalis (Reclamation Short)	
2017	Psychonauts in the Rhombus of Ruin	Sasha Nein	
2020	Mafia: Definitive Edition	Llewellyn Greer, Tannoy Announcer	
2021	Psychonauts 2	Sasha Nein	
2022	Lego Star Wars: The Skywalker Saga	Ben Kenobi	

=== Theme parks ===
- Disney California Adventure Jessie's Critter Carousel – Stinky Pete
- Disney California Adventure Toy Story Midway Mania! – Stinky Pete
- Disney D23 Expo Carousel of Projects – Narrator
- Disneyland Club 33 – Alfred the Vulture
- Disneyland Paris – Woody & Jessie's Wild West Adventure (Lucky Nugget Saloon) – Stinky Pete
- Disneyland Rivers of America – Mark Twain Riverboat Captain
- Disneyland Snow White's Enchanted Wish – Safety Spiel (as Happy)
- Disneyland The Haunted Mansion Phantom Radio app – Phineas
- Hong Kong Disneyland Mystic Manor – Lord Henry Mystic
- Shanghai Disneyland Celebration of Dreams Show (2016) – Happy
- Walt Disney World D23 Destination D: Attraction Rewind – Father
- Walt Disney World Seven Dwarfs Mine Train – Happy
- Walt Disney World Tomorrowland Transit Authority – TTA Announcer (ORAC-5)

== Visual effects work ==
=== Tippett Studio ===
- Starship Troopers (1997) – Digital Scanner Operator
- Armageddon (1998) – Digital Scanner Operator (Uncredited)
- Virus (1999) – Digital Scanner Operator
- Komodo (1999) – Digital Scanner Operator (Uncredited)
- My Favorite Martian (1999) – Digital Scanner Operator
- Hollow Man (2000) – Digital Scanner Operator
- Mission to Mars (2000) – Digital Scanner Operator (Uncredited)
- Cats & Dogs (2001) – Digital Scanner Operator (Uncredited)
- Evolution (2001) – Digital Scanner Operator

=== Boss Film Studios ===
- Solar Crisis (1990) – Production Assistant
- The Last of the Mohicans (1992) – Computer Graphics Coordinator
- Alien 3 (1992) – Digital Camera Operator
- Batman Returns (1992) – Digital Camera Operator
- Journey To Technopia (1993) – Digital Film I/O
- Cliffhanger (1993) – Computer Graphics Coordinator
- Last Action Hero (1993) – Computer Graphics Coordinator (Uncredited)
