= Marmaduke (2022 film) =

- South African theatrical release poster
- Directed by: Mark Dippé; Phil Nibbelink; Youngki Lee; Matt Whelan
- Screenplay by: Byron Kavanagh
- Based on: Marmaduke by: Brad Anderson; Paul Anderson
- Produced by: Dan Chuba; Mark Dippé; Bridget McMeel; Timothy Wayne Peternel; Youngki Lee; Jonghan Kim; Matthew Joynes; Simon Crowe
- Starring: Pete Davidson; J.K. Simmons; David Koechner; Julie Nathanson; Brian Hull; Shelby Young; Mary Hart
- Edited by: Aalaap Majgavkar; Aaron Seelman
- Music by: Nicholas Schnier
- Production companies: One Cool Animation; Andrews McMeel Entertainment; SC Films International; Legacy Classics Family Entertainment; StoryBerry
- Distributed by: Netflix
- Release date: May 6, 2022
- Running time: 88 minutes
- Countries: United States; Canada; Hong Kong; South Korea; United Kingdom
- Language: English
- Box office: $1.5 million

Marmaduke is a 2022 animated comedy film directed by Mark Dippé, and co-directed by Phil Nibbelink, Youngki Lee, and Matt Whelan, based on the comic strip of the same name by Paul and Brad Anderson. It stars Pete Davidson as Marmaduke, along with J.K. Simmons, Brian Hull, Shelby Young, David Koechner and Julie Nathanson. The film is an international co-production of the United States, Canada, Hong Kong, South Korea, and the United Kingdom.

It was released by SC Films in international countries and on Netflix in the United States on May 6, 2022. The film was widely panned by critics and audiences, with criticisms aimed towards its animation, screenplay, story, characters, voice acting, visuals and humor.

== Plot ==
Phil, his wife Dottie, and their two kids Barbara and Billy now live in Maryland with their dog, a Great Dane by the name of Marmaduke. The film opens at Billy's birthday party. Marmaduke takes a cannonball dive from the second floor of the family home into the backyard pool, releasing a tidal wave. Barbara records it on her phone and the video goes viral. It comes to the attention of a world-renowned dog trainer, Guy, who offers to turn Marmaduke into a world-class show dog. At first, the family isn't sure about Marmaduke entering the competitions. When Phil learns there is a one million dollar top prize, he's persuaded to make an agreement. Marmaduke goes into training and, after some initial resistance, he begins to make progress.

Guy enters Marmaduke into a local dog show to test his skills. During the preliminary setup, Marmaduke encounters an Afghan Hound named Zeus, who entices him to eat prior to the competition, which results in him getting stomach bloated. Marmaduke does his best to conceal the matter and struts onto the field with Guy. Before one lap around the field, Marmaduke releases voluminous clouds of noxious flatus, enveloping the entire field in the process. Desperate to relieve himself, Marmaduke soars through the air and lands backside down in the winner's trophy and defecates in it, much to the horror of everyone.

Disgraced, Guy refuses to keep training Marmaduke, leaving him deflated and dejected. Marmaduke runs away from home, but when he runs down the street, he sees the family cat, Carlos, in the middle of an intersection. Marmaduke saves him but has difficulty connecting with his character. Persuaded by Carlos, Marmaduke embarks on a trip around the globe, performing heroic stunts along the way. His circumnavigation convinces Guy to take Marmaduke back on track for the World Dog Championship. Marmaduke encounters Zeus again at the competition along with many other dogs: Mexican Welsh Corgi Juan Pedro, beautiful pink poodle Shantrelle, and strong Staffordshire Bull Terrier Vinnie. The competition consists of three challenges, but right after Marmaduke passes the second challenge, he lands on Guy, who immediately gets hospitalized. Without a trainer, his owners end up stepping in to coach him, allowing him to tackle the final challenge.

In the third and final challenge, the dogs perform a unique act, with Marmaduke and Billy doing a cowboy act with Carlos, pleasing the audience. Later, the judge's final results reveal Zeus as the winner. However, Marmaduke uncovers that Zeus's owner rigged the scores, leading Zeus to be disqualified and resulting in the Zen-powered Japanese Chin Zhi taking the top prize. Zeus tries to take back the trophy, but Marmaduke stops him. He ends up knocking over a platform where a cameraman sits, causing Marmaduke to push his owners out of the way, getting hit by the platform when saving the cameraman's life. Marmaduke is initially thought to be dead, but it is revealed that he is still alive, and initially winning the World Dog Championship and his family lived happily ever after.

During the mid-credits scene, Zeus gets caught by security and is sent to the dog pound to get his fur shaved and re-grown, while Henri and Philipe are sent to jail.

== Cast ==
- Pete Davidson as Marmaduke, a clumsy yet decent-natured Great Dane
- J.K. Simmons as Zeus, a cream-colored selfish Afghan Hound who is Marmaduke's second rival/nemesis
- David Koechner as Phil Winslow, the patriarch of the Winslow family and Marmaduke's owner
- Brian Hull as Guy Hilton, a dog trainer
- Erin Fitzgerald as Barbara Winslow, the teenage daughter of Dottie and Phil
- Julie Nathanson as Dottie Winslow, matriarch of the Winslow family and Phil's wife
- Terri Douglas as Billy Winslow, the son of Dottie and Phil
- Mary Hart as the Entertainer Mutt Tonight Host
- Shelby Young as Shantrelle, a French-accented pink poodle who is Marmaduke's love interest
- Stephen Stanton as Carlos, a Balinese cat owned by the Winslows
- Andrew Morgado as Henri and Philipe, Zeus' owners who are twins
- Nika Futterman as Juan Pedro, a small Welsh Corgi from Mexico
- Tania Gunadi as a cheerleader

== Production ==
On October 23, 2017, it was announced that a CGI Marmaduke film was in development, to be written by Byron Kavanag and directed by Mark A.Z. Dippé, who would produce alongside Dan Chuba and Matthew Joynes and Simon Crowe. In 2018, Andrews McMeel announced the involvement of cast members Pete Davidson as Marmaduke, J.K. Simmons as Marmaduke's rival "Zeus", and David Koechner as Phil Winslow. The film's animation was provided by Dippé's company WonderWorld Studios, currently known as StoryBerry, who has facilities in Toronto, Shanghai, and Seoul, while pre-production was done by Legacy Classics in Los Angeles and One Cool Animation in Hong Kong.

== Release ==
The film was first announced for a release in the second quarter of 2019. It was later slated for a release in 2020, but was delayed due to the COVID-19 pandemic. The film was acquired by Netflix in 2022. On April 8, 2022, Netflix released a trailer for the film, and announced at May 6 as its release date.

== Reception ==
=== Critical response ===
On the review aggregator website Rotten Tomatoes, 0% of 10 critics' reviews are positive, with an average rating of 2.4/10. Aurora Amidon of Paste Magazine criticized the formulaic and predictable plot, but praised the voice acting of Davidson, Simmons, and Koechner. For his role in the film, Pete Davidson was nominated for Worst Actor at the Golden Raspberry Awards.
