= Mark A.Z. Dippé =

American film director (born 1956)

Mark Dippé
- Born: Mark Earnest Dippé; November 9, 1956 (age 69); Tokyo, Japan
- Occupations: Visual effects artist, animator and director
- Years active: 1977–present

Mark A.Z. Dippé (/dɪˈpeɪ/; born November 9, 1956) is a Japanese-born American film director and visual effects supervisor. He made his directorial debut in 1997 with Spawn.

== Biography ==
Mark Earnest Dippé was born in Japan to a Chinese mother and an American father, both of whom worked for the United States Army. At the age of two, the Dippés moved back to the United States, where his father was discharged from the Army. Dippé grew up in Anchorage, Alaska, after his family moved there in 1960. When Dippé was 5, he persuaded his mother to take him to see the 1958 horror film The Fly. The film's transformation sequences impressed Dippé, who would grow an interest in visual effects. He left home at 17 for college, earning a Ph.D in computer graphics at the University of California, Berkeley in 1985. In 1988, he went to Industrial Light & Magic as some friends of his were hired to do the computer-generated imagery for The Abyss. Dippé wrote most of the code that created a photorealistic pseudopod built out of seawater, which was mostly animated by Steve 'Spaz' Williams. Dippé's later work included the T-1000 in Terminator 2: Judgment Day, and the dinosaurs of Jurassic Park, which were rendered in computer graphics after a successful demo made by Williams and Dippé. Dippé, Williams and Clint Goldman left ILM in 1997, forming production companies Pull Down Your Pants and Complete Pandemonium. The former was a production company in Dippé's directorial debut, the comic book adaptation Spawn, and the latter created various television commercials in the following years.

He is co-founder of The Animation Picture Company.

== Filmography ==
Year	Film	Notes
1995	Herbie Hancock: Dis Is da Drum	Short film
1997	Spawn	
2004	Pixel Perfect	Television film
2004	Frankenfish	Television film
2004	Halloweentown High	Television film
2007	Garfield Gets Real	Straight-to-DVD
2008	Garfield's Fun Fest	Straight-to-DVD
2009	Garfield's Pet Force	Straight-to-DVD
2012	The Reef 2: High Tide	
2013	Gutsy Frog	Unaired pilot
2014	The Boxcar Children	
2015	Ocean Quest: The Immersive Adventure	
2017	Michael Jackson's Halloween	
2018	The Boxcar Children: Surprise Island	
2022	Marmaduke	Netflix film
