= Behind Enemy Lines =

Behind Enemy Lines may refer to:

== Films ==
- Behind Enemy Lines (1985 film), an American film directed by Sheldon Larry, starring Hal Holbrook and Ray Sharkey
- Behind Enemy Lines (1986 film), an American film starring David Carradine
- Behind Enemy Lines (1997 film), an American film
- Behind Enemy Lines (film series)
  - Behind Enemy Lines (2001 film), an American film and three direct-to-video sequels:
  - Behind Enemy Lines II: Axis of Evil (2006)
  - Behind Enemy Lines: Colombia (2009)
  - SEAL Team 8: Behind Enemy Lines (2014)
- Behind Enemy Lines (2017 film), an American television film directed by McG

== Games ==
- Behind Enemy Lines (role-playing game), a 1982 military game
- Commandos: Behind Enemy Lines, a video game
- Behind Enemy Lines 2, the Russian name for the Men of War series

== Literature ==
- Behind Enemy Lines (book), an autobiography co-written by Holocaust survivor Marthe Cohn
- Behind Enemy Lines (Star Trek), a novel by John Vornholt

== Music ==
- Behind Enemy Lines (band), an American crust punk band
- Behind Enemy Lines (album), by Saving Grace
- "Behind Enemy Lines", a song from the album Let's Get Free by dead prez

== See also ==
- Behind the Lines (disambiguation)
