= Jason Davis (actor, born 1984) =

American actor (1984–2020)

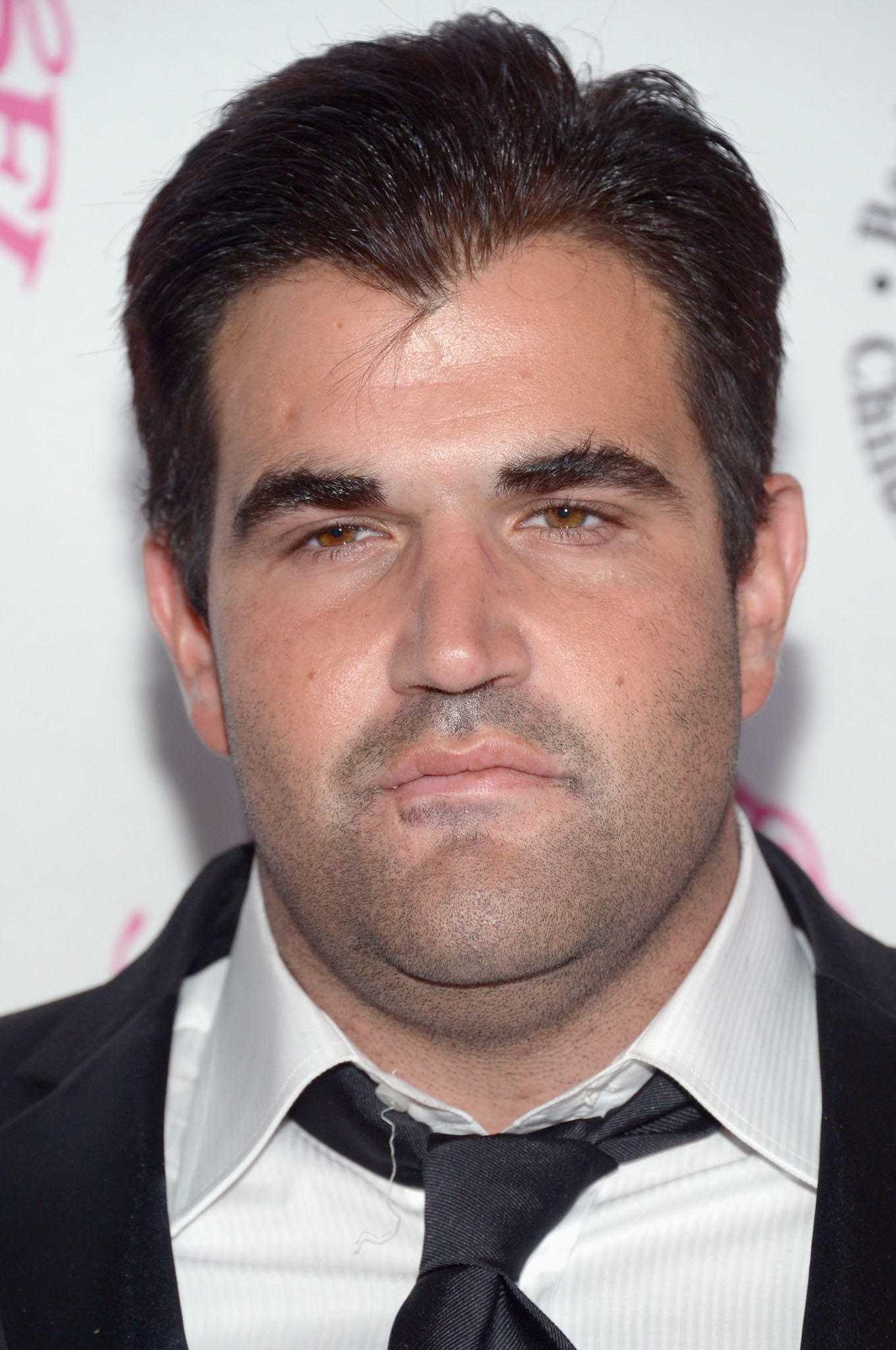
- Davis in 2016
- Born: October 14, 1984; Salt Lake City, Utah, U.S.
- Died: February 16, 2020 (aged 35); Los Angeles, California, U.S.
- Resting place: Westwood Memorial Park
- Occupation: Actor
- Years active: 1993–2020
- Relatives: Marvin Davis (grandfather); Barbara Davis (grandmother); John Davis (uncle)

Jason Phillip Davis (October 14, 1984 – February 16, 2020) was an American actor, best known for his role as Mikey Blumberg from the animated television series Recess.

== Early life and career ==
Davis was born in Salt Lake City, Utah, on October 14, 1984. He was the son of Turkish American immigrant and wine grower Nebil Zarif and Jewish American Nancy Davis, daughter of industrialist and billionaire Marvin Davis, and the grandson of Barbara Davis. He has two brothers: Brandon Davis and Alexander Davis and two half-sisters, Isabella and Mariella Rickel from his mother's second marriage to Ken Rickel.

Davis had a starring role on Recess, as Mikey Blumberg, from 1997 to 2001. Davis also appeared in 7th Heaven as Dwight Jefferson. He also appeared on Millionaire Matchmaker and Jessabelle.

Davis was a cast member on the fourth season of VH1's Celebrity Rehab with Dr. Drew, which documented his treatment for substance abuse.

At the time of his death, Davis was set to appear in the upcoming television series, The Two Jasons.

== Legal issues ==
Davis was arrested on January 28, 2011, in Newport Beach, California, for possession of a controlled substance.

== Death ==
Davis died in Los Angeles, California, on February 16, 2020, at the age of 35. His cause of death was revealed as the effects of fentanyl; it was ruled an accident.

== Filmography ==
Year	Title	Role	Notes
1993–1995	Roseanne	Obnoxious Vampire Kid	3 episodes
1994	Dave's World	Marco	Episode: "Just Kidding"
1995	The Crude Oasis	Crude Oasis Bar Patron	
1997	Beverly Hills Ninja	Young Haru	
1997	7th Heaven	Dwight Jefferson	3 episodes
1997	The Locusts	Wrangler	
1997–2001	Recess	Mikey Blumberg, Tubby (voices)	Starring/Recurring role
1998	Breakfast with Einstein	Chipper	Television film
1998	Mafia!	Geno	
1998	Rush Hour	Kid at Theatre	
2001	Recess: School's Out	Mikey Blumberg (voice)	
2001	Recess Christmas: Miracle on Third Street	Mikey Blumberg (voice)	Direct-to-video
2003	Recess: All Growed Down	Mikey Blumberg, Tubby (voices)	Direct-to-video
2003	Recess: Taking the Fifth Grade	Mikey Blumberg, Tubby (voices)	Direct-to-video
2005	Surface	Sean	1 episode
2008	Fab Five: The Texas Cheerleader Scandal	Tim	Television film
2013	Fallen Angel	Agent	Short film
2014	He Don't Got Game	Himself	1 episode
2014	The Bathroom Diaries	Enzo	Episode: "C: Caution" (final role before death)
