= Behind Enemy Lines (film series) =

Film series

- Created by: Jim Thomas; John Thomas
- Original work: Behind Enemy Lines
- Owner: 20th Century Studios

Films and television
- Film(s): Behind Enemy Lines; Behind Enemy Lines II: Axis of Evil; Behind Enemy Lines: Colombia; SEAL Team 8: Behind Enemy Lines

Behind Enemy Lines is a series of war films beginning with Behind Enemy Lines in 2001, followed by films in 2006, 2009 and 2014. All four films feature the United States Navy.

== Films ==
Film	U.S. release date	Director(s)	Screenwriter(s)	Story by	Producer(s)
Behind Enemy Lines	November 30, 2001	John Moore	David Veloz & Zak Penn	Jim Thomas & John Thomas	John Davis
Behind Enemy Lines II: Axis of Evil	October 17, 2006	James Dodson	James Dodson	James Dodson	Roee Sharon; James Dodson
Behind Enemy Lines: Colombia	January 6, 2009	Tim Matheson	Tobias Iaconis	Tobias Iaconis	Jeff Freilich; Michael Lake
SEAL Team 8: Behind Enemy Lines	April 1, 2014	Roel Reiné	Shane Kuhn & Brendan Cowles	Roel Reiné	David Wicht

=== Behind Enemy Lines (2001) ===
Lieutenant Chris Burnett, an American naval flight officer, is shot down over Bosnia and his co-pilot is killed. He uncovers genocide in the midst of the Bosnian War. Meanwhile, his commanding officer is struggling to gain approval to launch a search and rescue mission to save Burnett.

=== Behind Enemy Lines II: Axis of Evil (2006) ===
After reconnaissance satellites detect a large, three-stage Topol intercontinental ballistic missile carrying a nuclear weapon in North Korea, which can strike anywhere in the continental United States, President Adair T. Manning orders a team of U.S. Navy SEALs led by Lieutenant Bobby James to destroy the missile and the launch site.

=== Behind Enemy Lines: Colombia (2009) ===
Colombia is in chaos, as a five-man team of US Navy SEALS commanded by Lieutenant Sean Macklin embark on a secret mission to ensure that peace talks between the country's government and insurgent guerrillas don't erupt into violence, an unforeseen complication threatens all out war. Out of nowhere, the meeting falls under attack and the leaders from both sides are killed. The SEALS have been framed for the crime, leaving them to fight for their lives from behind enemy lines against the Colombian Special Forces (AFEUR). Abandoned by their government and left for dead, the weary soldiers race to uncover the evidence that will prove their innocence while ensuring that the violence is contained. Should the fighting spill over the border, the entire region could be plunged into a nightmarish inferno of war and death.

=== SEAL Team 8: Behind Enemy Lines (2014) ===
A team of United States Navy SEALs is sent on an unsanctioned mission in Africa to find a secret mining operation and prevent weapons-grade uranium from falling into the hands of terrorists.

== Cancelled pilot ==
On September 15, 2015, Fox announced a television pilot based on the original film with Homeland director Jeffrey Nachmanoff as writer and director of the pilot which would be produced by Davis Entertainment. The pilot will be rewritten by Nikki Toscano. Fox has ordered a pilot directed by McG. On February 13, 2017, B.J. Britt has landed one of the leads in the pilot. On May 23, 2017, Fox passed on the pilot.

== Cast and characters ==
Characters	Films			
Characters	Behind Enemy Lines	Behind Enemy Lines II: Axis of Evil	Behind Enemy Lines: Colombia	SEAL Team 8: Behind Enemy Lines
Lieutenant Chris Burnett	Owen Wilson			
Rear Admiral Leslie Reigart	Gene Hackman			
Lieutenant Jeremy Stackhouse	Gabriel Macht			
Captain Rodway	Charles Malik Whitfield			
Master Chief Tom O'Malley	David Keith			
General Miroslav Lokar	Olek Krupa			
Lieutenant Robert James		Nicholas Gonzalez		
Master Chief Neil T. Callaghan		Matt Bushell		
President Adair T. Manning		Peter Coyote		
General Norman T. Vance		Bruce McGill		
Commander Scott Boytano		Keith David	Keith David	
Lieutenant Sean Macklin			Joe Manganiello	
Master Chief Petty Officer Carter Holt			Mr. Kennedy	
Chief Petty Officer Kevin Derricks			Channon Roe	
Alvaro Cardona			Yancey Arias	
General Manuel Velez			Steven Bauer	
Ricks				Tom Sizemore
Lieutenant Parker				Langley Kirkwood
Collins				Tanya van Graan
Case				Lex Shrapnel
Officer				Bonnie Lee Bouman

== Crew ==
Crew/Detail	Film			
Crew/Detail	Behind Enemy Lines	Behind Enemy Lines II: Axis of Evil	Behind Enemy Lines: Colombia	SEAL Team 8: Behind Enemy Lines
Director	John Moore	James Dodson	Tim Matheson	Roel Reiné
Music	Don Davis	Pinar Toprak	Joseph Conla	Mark Kilian
Writer	Screenplay: David Veloz; Zak Penn; Story by: Jim Thomas; John Thomas	James Dodson	Tobias Iaconis	Screenplay: Brendan Cowles; Shane Kuhn; Story by: Roel Reiné
Running time	106 minutes	96 minutes	94 minutes	98 minutes
