= Behind the Lines =

Behind the Lines may refer to:

== Books ==
- Behind the Lines, 1930 by W. F. Morris
- Behind the Lines, a 2005 collection of letters written by soldiers during the wars in American history
- Behind the Lines—Hanoi, 1967 by Harrison E. Salisbury
- Behind The Lines: The Oral History of Special Operations in World War II, 2002 by Russell Miller
- Behind the Lines: The Year's Best Cartoons, 2003–2010 by the National Museum of Australia

== Film and TV ==
- Behind the Lines (1916 film), a 1916 film starring Harry Carey
- Behind the Lines (1997 film), Regeneration (1997 film) or Behind the Lines, a 1997 film
- "Behind the Lines" (Star Trek: Deep Space Nine), an episode of Star Trek: Deep Space Nine
- Behind the Lines, 1985 BBC Television documentary series Mountain Leader Training Cadre

== Music ==
- Behind the Lines Cecil Coles
- Behind the Lines (John Schumann album)
- Behind the Lines (David Knopfler album)
- Behind the Lines, John Schumann and the Vagabond Crew
- "Behind the Lines" (Genesis song)

== See also ==
- Behind Enemy Lines (disambiguation)
