= Behind Enemy Lines: Colombia =

- DVD cover
- Directed by: Tim Matheson
- Written by: Tobias Iaconis
- Produced by: Jeff Freilich; Michael Lake
- Starring: Joe Manganiello; Ken Anderson; Yancey Arias; Channon Roe; Tim Matheson; Chris J. Johnson; Steven Bauer; Keith David
- Cinematography: Claudio Chea
- Edited by: Matthew Booth
- Music by: Joseph Conlan
- Production company: WWE Studios
- Distributed by: 20th Century Fox Home Entertainment
- Release date: January 6, 2009
- Running time: 94 minutes
- Country: United States
- Language: English

Behind Enemy Lines: Colombia is a 2009 American action war film directed by Tim Matheson and starring Joe Manganiello, WWE wrestler Mr. Kennedy, Keith David and Matheson. It is the third installment in the Behind Enemy Lines film series, following Behind Enemy Lines, and Behind Enemy Lines II: Axis of Evil. The film was co-produced by WWE Studios, written by Tobias Iaconis and released direct-to-video on January 6, 2009. Keith David is the only cast member to have returned in this film.

== Plot ==
Colombia has endured a decades-long conflict between its government and FARC guerrillas. Leaders called for peace talks and a ceasefire. Rear Admiral Scott Boyano is sending a five-man U.S. Navy SEALs team—Lieutenant Sean Macklin, Master Chief Carter Holter, Chief Kevin Derricks, Petty Officer Steve Gaines, and Petty Officer Greg Armstrong—on a secret mission to find a suspected drug cartel cache arming the rebels.

The SEALs insert behind enemy lines via HALO jump, and into the Ariari River to infiltrate the perimeter, only to discover that the perimeter is hosting a secret peace talk between the country's government, represented by Colombian Army General Manuel Valez, and guerrilla leaders.

The mission was compromised when AFEUR Colombian special forces, led by Commander Alvaro Cardona, attacked the peace talks, killing many leaders and forcing the SEALs to retreat. Armstrong and Gaines are killed in a shootout, Derricks was captured, and Alvaro used the SEALs' video footage to broadcast it publicly, which caused outrage and increased FARC's terrorist activities. The Colombian president demands that U.S. forces withdraw, and the U.S. government disavows the team to prevent escalation.

Macklin and Holter race to extraction but are left behind, pursued by authorities. Derricks is interrogated by Alvaro, who learns his wife and son were killed in a FARC bombing in Bogotá, blaming the FARC. Boyano, aware of the incident, aids the SEALs since the NSA oversees the operation, helping track Derricks to the SEALs in Villavicencio. After rescuing Derricks, Macklin confronts Manuel, the only shooting survivor, at the hospital, and agrees to find evidence of their innocence and contain the violence.

Boyano discovers that the SEALs were set up; the CIA liaison, Carlos Rivera, leaked information about the secret peace talks to the CIA, which allowed the mission to happen, and also informed the Colombian special forces. He also learns that Rivera's handler, codename "Apotequil", was actually involved with Carlos and was responsible for the bombings. He relays the information to Macklin and the SEALs.

The SEALs manage to retrieve the video camera from Greg's overwatch position, capturing footage of the entire incident, and Macklin contacts Manuel to meet at the rendezvous point. They are pursued by Alvaro and the Colombian special forces. After dispatching the enemy forces, Macklin and the SEALs are held at gunpoint by Manuel and Rivera.

Manuel reveals that Alvaro was working for him and that he was Rivera's handler, "Apotequil." He leaked the peace talks to the CIA through Rivera so Manuel could kill the FARC leaders and justify starting a war to eradicate the FARC as revenge for his family's death caused by the guerrillas. He also resented Colombia's dependence on U.S. aid, so he wanted Rivera to initiate the bombings that killed Alvaro's wife and son, allowing the U.S. military to authorize the operation and spread American resentment to push them out of the country.

Realizing that Manuel was responsible for his family's death, Alvaro turned on him, allowing Macklin to kill Manuel and Rivera. Macklin hands over the footage to Alvaro so that Manuel's crimes can be exposed. Diplomatic relations between the U.S. and Colombia were restored, and the SEALs recovered their fallen comrades' bodies and were sent back home.

== Cast ==
- Joe Manganiello as Lieutenant Sean Macklin
- Mr. Kennedy as Master Chief Petty Officer Carter Holter
- Channon Roe as Chief Petty Officer Kevin Derricks
- Yancey Arias as Alvaro Cardona
- Chris J. Johnson as Petty Officer 3rd Class Steve Gaines
- Antony Matos as Petty Officer 2nd Class Greg Armstrong
- Jennice Fuentes as Nicole Jennings
- Keith David as Commander Scott Boytano
- Steven Bauer as General Manuel Valez
- Tim Matheson as Carl Dobb
- Luzangeli Justiniano as Maria Cardona
- Anibal O. Lleras as Carlos Rivera
- Rey Hernandez as Ramirez

== Production ==
The film takes place in Colombia, but was shot in Puerto Rico.

== Release ==
The film was released on January 6, 2009.

== Sequel ==
Behind Enemy Lines: Colombia was followed by another direct-to-video sequel, SEAL Team 8: Behind Enemy Lines, starring Tom Sizemore.

== See also ==
- List of films featuring the United States Navy SEALs
