= List of films featuring the United States Navy SEALs =

There are a body of films that feature the United States Navy SEALs. The box office successes of Act of Valor in 2012 and Lone Survivor in 2013 led studios to seek out more real-life accounts of Navy SEALs to portray on film. Director Clint Eastwood released American Sniper in late 2014, and Eric Blehm's book about a SEAL Team Six operator, Fearless, also attracted attention from studios. Hollie McKay at Fox News wrote, "Within much of the SEAL community, there is still great hesitancy with regards to the slew of books and films being written and made about their operations. After all, it is not a profession one seeks for fame or fortune."

== List of films featuring active duty Navy SEALs ==
The following films are listed alphabetically:

| Film | Year | Description |
|---|---|---|
| The Abyss | 1989 | In the science fiction film, a Navy SEAL team and the crew of an underwater oil rig are sent to search for a sunken nuclear submarine. |
| Act of Valor | 2012 | The film features a series of missions performed by the Navy SEALs. |
| American Sniper | 2014 | The film is based on the memoirs of Chris Kyle, who was a sniper in the U.S. military and had four tours in the Iraq War. |
| Behind Enemy Lines II: Axis of Evil | 2006 | A Navy SEAL team that travels to North Korea to destroy a missile site must then fight its way out. |
| Behind Enemy Lines: Colombia | 2009 | A Navy SEAL team travels to Colombia to spy on a secret meeting in its jungles and is subsequently attacked by a paramilitary group who seeks to disrupt the meeting, which turns out to be peace talks. |
| Captain Phillips | 2013 | The film dramatizes the real-life Navy SEAL rescue of the Maersk Alabama hijacking by Somali pirates. |
| Deadly Heroes | 1993 | Michael Paré portrays a former Navy SEAL who is captured and tortured. |
| The Finest Hour | 1991 | The film features two men who enter Navy SEAL training and become best friends. |
| G.I. Jane | 1997 | A woman goes through a Navy SEAL training program in which only men are usually allowed. |
| Goodbye America | 1997 | The film follows the lives of three members of the Navy SEALs leading up to the 1992 closing of the U.S. Naval Base Subic Bay. |
| Hunter Killer | 2018 | An American submarine captain and a Navy SEAL team attempt to rescue the Russian president, who has been kidnapped by a rogue general. |
| Lone Survivor | 2013 | The film is based on the failed mission of a team of Navy SEALs in Afghanistan in 2005. |
| Navy SEALs | 1990 | A squad of Navy SEALs are given a chance to stop an enemy leader that has stolen American missiles. |
| Renegades | 2017 | A group of Navy SEALs discover treasure under a lake in Bosnia. |
| The Rescue | 1988 | A group of Navy SEALs are captured off the coast of North Korea and imprisoned. Their children infiltrate their prison to rescue them. |
| The Rock | 1996 | The film's protagonists accompany a team of Navy SEALs to Alcatraz Island to stop an attack by rogue U.S. Force Recon Marines on San Francisco. |
| SEAL Team 8: Behind Enemy Lines | 2014 | The film features a Navy SEAL team in Africa attempting to stop weapons from falling into the wrong hands. |
| Seal Team Six: The Raid on Osama Bin Laden | 2012 | The docu-drama shows a team of Navy SEALs raiding Osama bin Laden's compound. |
| Silver Strand | 1995 | Follows Class 195 through BUD/S. |
| Stratton | 2017 | A British Special Boat Service commando partners with a Navy SEAL to track down an international terrorist cell. |
| Tears of the Sun | 2003 | A team of Navy SEALs enters a civil war zone in Nigeria to recover U.S. nationals. |
| Under Siege | 1992 | When the USS Missouri is hijacked by mercenaries, a former Navy SEAL (Steven Seagal) serving as a cook aboard the ship launches a one-man counterattack to retake the vessel. Navy SEALs are deployed in an unsuccessful attempt to reclaim the ship. |
| Warfare | 2025 | Based on ex-Navy SEAL Ray Mendoza's real-life experiences during the Iraq War in 2006. |
| Without Remorse | 2021 | Based on the Tom Clancy's novel about a Navy SEAL who uncovers an international conspiracy while seeking justice for the murder of his pregnant wife by Russian soldiers. |
| Zero Dark Thirty | 2012 | The film's climax dramatizes the real-life occurrence of a team of Navy SEALs raiding Osama bin Laden's compound. |

== List of TV shows featuring active duty Navy SEALs ==
- SEAL Team, a CBS TV series (2017–2024)
- Six, a History TV series (2017–2018)
- The Terminal List, an Amazon Prime Video TV series (2022–present)

== Actors with recurring active duty Navy SEALs roles ==
- Michael Biehn played a Navy SEAL in: The Abyss, Navy SEALs and The Rock
- Cam Gigandet played a Navy SEAL in: Seal Team Six: The Raid on Osama Bin Laden and Without Remorse
- Chris Pratt played a Navy SEAL in: Zero Dark Thirty and The Terminal List
- Luke Grimes played a Navy SEAL in American Sniper and Yellowstone
- Cole Hauser played a Navy SEAL in Tears of the Sun and Jarhead 2

== See also ==
- The Frogmen, a 1951 film featuring operations by United States Navy Underwater Demolition Teams, the forerunners to the Navy SEALs.
