= Marvin Davis =

American industrialist (1925–2004)

- Born: August 31, 1925; Newark, New Jersey, U.S.
- Died: September 25, 2004 (aged 79); Beverly Hills, California, U.S.
- Education: New York University (B.S.)
- Occupation: Businessman
- Known for: Chairman of Davis Petroleum, film mogul
- Spouse: Barbara Levine (m. 1951)
- Children: 5, including John
- Relatives: Jason Davis (grandson)

Marvin H. Davis (August 31, 1925 – September 25, 2004) was an American industrialist. He made his fortunes as the chair of Davis Petroleum and at one time owned 20th Century Fox, the Pebble Beach Corporation, the Beverly Hills Hotel, and the Aspen Skiing Company.

== Early life and education ==
Marvin Davis was raised in a Jewish family, the son of Jack Davis and Jean Spitzer. He had one younger sister, Joan (born 1929).

His father came to the United States from London as a teenager in 1917 and later joined the Royal Navy after reportedly applying for a college scholarship but being denied it because he was Jewish. Jack Davis became a successful fashion buyer for New York department stores. He went on to found Jay Day Dress Co., a well-priced line of women's dresses that achieved great success, selling 200,000 dresses per-month to stores across the nation. In 1939 he partnered with Ray Ryan, who owned the Ryan Oil Company, and they started the Davis Oil Company.

Marvin graduated with a Bachelor of Science degree in engineering from New York University in 1947.

== Petroleum business ==
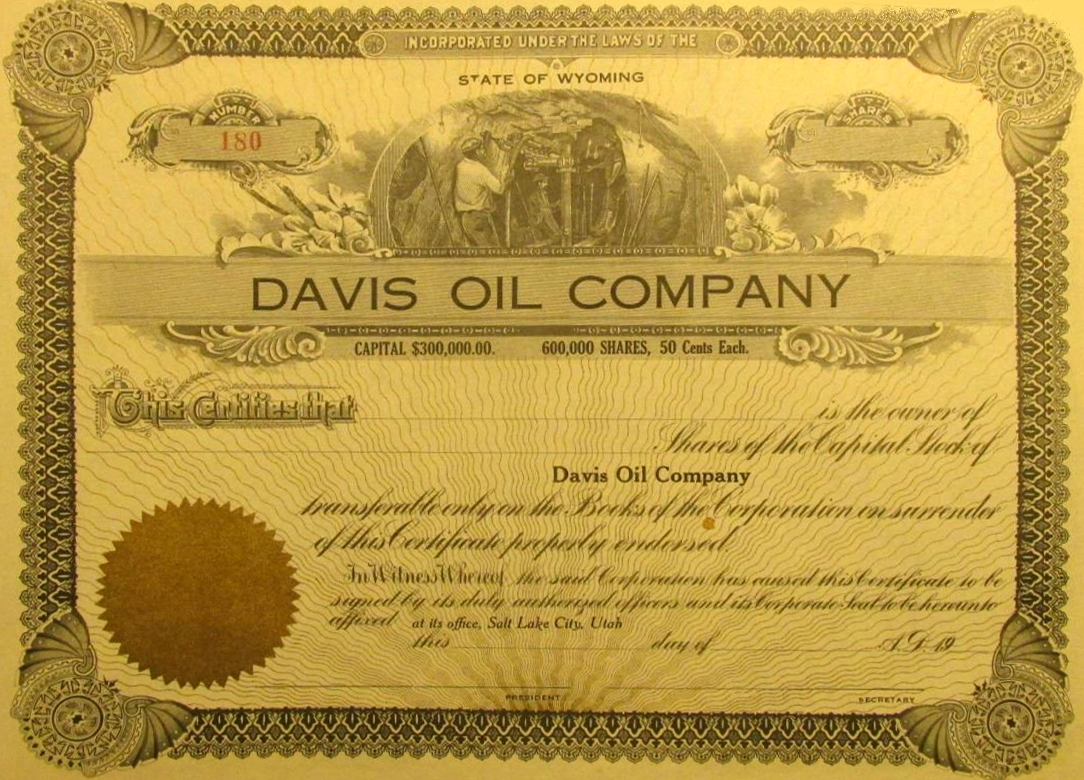
A blank Davis Oil Company's stock certificate

He joined his father in the oil exploration business and was later nicknamed "Mr. Wildcatter." The Davis Oil Company drilled for oil and gas in the West beginning in the 1940s and was incorporated in 1986 as Davis Petroleum, headquartered in Denver, Colorado. In 1960s–1980s, it became a leading independent oil and gas producer in the United States, focusing on drilling in Wyoming, where the company owned a 150-mile pipeline.

Marvin Davis's son Gregg Davis took over as president of Davis Petroleum and Davis Offshore in 1997.

Davis senior's partner Ray Ryan was a pioneer of the oil deal known as the "third for a quarter," where investors in a wildcat oil well would each buy one-quarter of the well's production for a third of the cost of drilling the well, leaving all costs paid and Davis and Ryan owners of one-quarter of the well.

Marvin Davis developed the oil business, and also became a major real estate developer in Denver, acquiring a shopping center and office complex.

Davis offered to purchase the Oakland Athletics from Charlie Finley for $12 million on December 12, 1977, with the intention of moving the franchise to Denver. The Oakland–Alameda County Coliseum Authority filed a lawsuit to block the sale because Finley had ten years remaining on a lease that began with the transfer of the ballclub's operations from Kansas City for the 1968 season. Davis ended negotiations on January 23, 1978, and the Athletics remained in Oakland under Finley's continued ownership.

In 1981, Davis sold most of his oil holdings for $600 million to the Canadian company Hiram Walker-Consumers Home, Ltd. The United States Justice Department accused one of his Davis' companies of violating federal oil-pricing policies. The case was settled in 1981, with Davis paying a $20,000 fine. Business partners accused him in civil lawsuits of inflating the results of his oil wells.

== 20th Century Fox and later career ==
In 1981, Davis acquired 20th Century Fox for $703 million with financier Marc Rich. Fox's assets included Pebble Beach Golf Links, the Aspen Skiing Company, and a Century City property upon which he built and twice sold Fox Plaza, which was made famous as "Nakatomi Plaza" in the 1988 action film Die Hard. While Davis was head of 20th Century Fox, President Ronald Reagan and his wife, Nancy, complained to him about excessive sexuality in films. Reagan suggested to Davis that he produce films that implied, rather than showed, sex, in the style of director Ernst Lubitsch. In 1984 Davis appointed Barry Diller, formerly chairman and chief executive officer of Paramount Pictures, to the chairman and CEO role at 20th Century Fox. Diller asked Davis for complete control, with Davis promising to provide financing for the studio. Fox's financial situation was precarious, with the company owing $600 million. Banks would not provide any extension to the loan, and Diller pressed Davis for the new equity he had promised to put into Fox. Diller claims that Davis stalled and suggested that Diller call Michael Milken for a $250 million junk-bond loan, which would have been Diller's, not Davis', responsibility.

By 1985, Rich was in Switzerland; this was despite being under federal indictment in the United States for violating sanctions against his commodity trades with Iran. Marc Rich had arranged with Davis for Davis to buy out his interest in 20th Century Fox for $116 million. Davis sold this interest to Rupert Murdoch for $250 million in March 1984. Davis later backed out of a deal with Murdoch to purchase John Kluge's Metromedia television stations, which would form what is now the Fox network. Murdoch went alone and bought the studios, and later bought out Davis's remaining stake in 20th Century Fox for $325 million. Davis sold Pebble Beach Golf Links to Japanese businessman Minoru Isutani for $841 million in 1990. Winning a bidding war against the Sultan of Brunei, Hassanal Bolkiah, Davis bought the Beverly Hills Hotel for $135 million in 1986. Davis later sold the hotel to the sultan for a $65 million profit.

In 1999, Davis attempted to build a stadium in Los Angeles to lure the National Football League to award the city an expansion franchise during a 20-year span (1995–2015) when the NFL was absent from Los Angeles. The expansion team ultimately went to Houston and became the Houston Texans, who began play in 2002.

In later years, Davis was linked to takeover targets including Northwest Airlines, US Airways, CBS, NBC and T. Boone Pickens' Mesa. A proponent of greenmail, the threatening of takeover bids that never come to pass, Davis said "All you have to do is look at the pretty girl and everyone thinks you're sleeping with her. You don't have to put up any money". In a 2002 deal structured by businessman Ramy El-Batrawi, Davis made an unsolicited $15 billion bid for the entertainment assets of Vivendi.

The Denver Broncos National Football League team was targeted by failed takeover bids from Davis.

== Philanthropy and political donations ==
Davis was a long-time philanthropist, especially for medical research. A research building at Cedars-Sinai Medical Center in Los Angeles is named for him. The Davis's daughter Dana is a diabetic, and they founded the Children's Diabetes Foundation which hosts the biannual Carousel of Hope ball to raise money for juvenile diabetes.

Davis and his wife were for many years major donors and fundraisers for the Democratic Party. When President Bill Clinton failed to appear personally at the Carousel of Hope ball and instead sent a videotaped message, Barbara Davis told a reporter: "There are 25 people in our family...I told the White House person, "You are now talking to 25 new Republicans"".

== Personal life ==
Marvin Davis was married for 53 years to Barbara Levine. They had five children and as of November 2005, fourteen grandchildren:

- Dana Davis, a Type 1 diabetic, is an active philanthropist with a focus on diabetes. She began her career as an elementary school teacher but was forced to retire due to diabetes-related foot problems which required eight separate surgeries. Unhappy with the stylishly poor selection of shoes available for people with foot problems, she developed her own line of footwear, Dana Davis Shoes, which meshed the required comfort levels with high fashion. She is now the executive director of the Children's Diabetes Foundation.
- Gregg Davis was the President of Davis Petroleum Corp., Davis Petroleum Pipeline, and Davis Offshore, the family's former oil and gas companies. He is the former husband of American actress Kim Richards. Davis and Richards had two children together: daughter Whitney and son Chad.
- Patricia Ann Davis Raynes married New York real estate developer Martin Raynes in a Jewish ceremony in 1983. In 2005, Patricia sued her mother and four siblings alleging that they "looted" a trust fund set up by her paternal grandfather, Jack, who created the original Davis Oil Co. that was the foundation of the family's wealth.
- John Davis (born 1954) is an American film producer and the founder of Davis Entertainment.
- Nancy Davis Rickel, diagnosed with Multiple sclerosis, is an active supporter of charities dedicated to its cure. She has been married twice. Her first husband was Turkish American wine grower, Nebil Zarif. They had three children: Brandon Davis, Alexander Davis and actor Jason Davis. Her second husband is entrepreneur Ken Rickel. They have twin daughters: Isabella and Mariella. She is also the godmother of Nicole Richie.

Friend Aaron Spelling loosely based the Carrington family of his TV series Dynasty on the Davises, even filming an episode at their Colorado home.

In 1984, the Davises purchased The Knoll, a 45,000-square-foot house in Beverly Hills from Kenny Rogers, where they hosted lavish Christmas parties.

In 1993, Davis and his wife were robbed of $10 million of jewels and $50,000 cash by masked gunmen while on holiday in the south of France.

Davis was identified with his towering stature, measuring 6 feet 4 inches (1.93 m) tall. He was known for his large appetite, with Fox executive Alan Hirschfield saying that Davis "was the poster boy for everything you shouldn't eat"; he weighed over 300 pounds (140 kg) for much of his adult life, though he lost about 130 pounds (59 kg) as his health failed in his final years.

== Death and aftermath ==
In Davis's last decade, he experienced a series of ailments, including diabetes, heart disease, a spinal tumor, pneumonia, and sepsis, and he died at The Knoll on September 25, 2004, at the age of 79. He was interred in the Westwood Village Memorial Park Cemetery in Los Angeles.

=== Family disputes over estate ===
Davis' eldest daughter, Patricia Davis Raynes, sued her four siblings, her mother, and several of the family's advisers, alleging that they had all helped her father to systematically steal her trust fund before his death. Her lawsuit alleged that Marvin had entrapped and beaten Patricia in an attempt to get her to sign documents giving him control over her finances. Patricia Davis later settled with all 14 parties named in her complaint, and the case was closed in January 2008. By the conclusion of Patricia Davis' case, sister Nancy Davis had taken her brother Gregg to court over the sale of Davis Petroleum, in March 2006.

Nancy Davis alleged that her brother and his partners vastly undervalued the company and thereby denied her (and her mother and siblings) of as much as $50 million in proceeds. Lawyers for Gregg Davis deny the allegations. The Texas bankruptcy court that had originally approved the deal to sell Davis Petroleum ruled in favor of Gregg and his partners, then a district-court judge dismissed Nancy's appeal. As of 2009 the case had bounced back to the bankruptcy court.
