= John Davis (producer) =

American film producer

- Born: John Andrew Davis; July 20, 1954 (age 72); Denver, Colorado, U.S.
- Education: Bowdoin College; Harvard Business School
- Occupation: Film producer
- Known for: Founder of Davis Entertainment
- Spouse: Jordan Davis
- Children: 3
- Parents: Marvin Davis (father); Barbara Davis (mother)

John Andrew Davis (born July 20, 1954) is an American film producer and founder of Davis Entertainment.

== Early life and education ==
Davis was born and raised in Denver, Colorado. He is the son of Barbara Davis (née Levine), a philanthropist, and former 20th Century Fox owner and oil and media industrialist Marvin Davis (1925–2004). His interest in cinema began as a youth when his father purchased the neighborhood film theater, where he sold popcorn and subsequently viewed up to 300 films a year. Davis graduated from Bowdoin College, attended Amherst College, and received an M.B.A. from Harvard Business School. Davis is of Jewish descent.

== Career ==
Davis, Chairman of Los Angeles–based Davis Entertainment, is one of the most prolific producers in film history, having produced more than 130 feature film and television projects. His movies have collectively grossed more than $8 billion worldwide, with talent such as Hugh Jackman, Robert Downey Jr., Gal Gadot, Jennifer Lawrence, Dwayne Johnson, Emily Blunt, Will Smith, Tom Cruise, Ben Affleck, Denzel Washington, Arnold Schwarzenegger, Eddie Murphy, Samuel L Jackson, and more. In television, John Davis has put twelve network series on the air in the last few years.

Upcoming Davis Entertainment releases include Amazon MGM Studios' The Pickup, starring Eddie Murphy, Pete Davidson, and Keke Palmer, releasing on August 6, 2025; Amazon MGM Studios' Fake Wedding, starring Lili Reinhart; Netflix's 72 Hours, starring Kevin Hart; Focus Features' Song Sung Blue, starring Hugh Jackman and Kate Hudson; Netflix's Eddie Murphy documentary, Eddie; Paramount Pictures' Vertigo, starring Robert Downey Jr.; Universal Pictures' Blood Runs Coal, starring Cillian Murphy; and Sony's On Your Feet!, a feature adaptation of the Broadway musical telling the story of Emilio and Gloria Estefan. Upcoming television projects also include Rear Window, a reimagining of the Alfred Hitchcock classic, also for Peacock. Davis is also working on an untitled biopic on Parliament-Funkadelic leader George Clinton starring Eddie Murphy alongside his daughter, Catherine Davis, who originated the project.

Davis' recent productions include Lionsgate's Flight Risk, starring Mark Wahlberg, Michelle Dockery, and Topher Grace; Lifetime's Mary J. Blige's Family Affair, starring Ajiona Alexus and Da'Vinchi, which Davis produced with his wife Jordan; the Netflix film Uglies, starring Joey King, also co-produced with Davis' wife Jordan, reached number one on Netflix and was watched by 67 million people; Sony Pictures' Harold and the Purple Crayon, which starred Zachary Levi and Zooey Deschanel; Predator origin movie Prey, starring Amber Midthunder. The movie was nominated for the Primetime Emmy Award for Outstanding Television Movie, among various other awards. Other Davis movies include Jaume Collet-Serra's Jungle Cruise, starring Dwayne Johnson and Emily Blunt, based on the Disney ride; Dolemite Is My Name, the Eddie Murphy starrer which was nominated for Best Comedy at the 77th Golden Globe Awards and won the Critics Choice Award for Best Comedy; the action comedy Game Night, starring Jason Bateman, Rachel McAdams, and Kyle Chandler; the Oscar-nominated biopic Joy, starring Jennifer Lawrence; the $100 million-plus-grossing micro-budgeted sci-fi thriller Chronicle; and the animated film Ferdinand, which was nominated for an Academy Award for Best Animated Feature.

His past television credits include the international hit The Blacklist; the half-hour comedy series Laid, starring Stephanie Hsu; and The Equalizer, starring Queen Latifah. His other film credits include Mr. Popper's Penguins, starring Jim Carrey; the international adventure comedy hit Gulliver's Travels, starring Jack Black; the sci-fi thriller I, Robot, starring Will Smith; the Garfield film franchise; Courage Under Fire, starring Denzel Washington and Meg Ryan; the blockbuster drama The Firm, starring Tom Cruise; Waterworld, starring Kevin Costner; the Jack Lemmon/Walter Matthau trilogy of Out to Sea, Grumpy Old Men, and Grumpier Old Men; Behind Enemy Lines, starring Owen Wilson and Gene Hackman; John Woo's Paycheck, starring Ben Affleck and Uma Thurman; and the Predator franchise films: Predator, starring Arnold Schwarzenegger, Predator 2, and Alien vs. Predator.

Davis was honored as The Hollywood Reporter's Producer of the Year in 2015 and ShoWest's Producer of the Year in 2004. He also won two People's Choice Awards, for The Firmand Grumpy Old Men, and his films have received several Academy Award nominations.

== Other projects ==
Aside from film production, Davis has incubated numerous fast-casual restaurant concepts of the past two decades, including Dave's Hot Chicken, Blaze Pizza, Wetzel's Pretzels, and PopUp Bagels. Davis has helped guide these franchises, grow their locations, and has seen huge success for each financially. In 2019, Davis met four friends who had founded Dave's Hot Chicken; Arman Oganesyan, Tommy Rubenyan, Gary Rubenyan, and Dave Kopushyan. Once on the team as the lead investor, Davis helped grow the business from one single location, to now around 300. The company has since been sold for $1 billion. Last year, Davis founded a modern tea company whose new line of teas will be available to the general public in September.

Davis has owned, operated, and started several small market television stations.

== Personal life ==
Davis is married to Jordan Davis. They have three children: Jack, Catherine, and Jensen, as mentioned in the Garfield: The Movie DVD commentary. Davis's three children said that the CG version of Garfield looked "evil" when they first saw him.

== Filmography ==
He was a producer in all films unless otherwise noted.

=== Feature films ===
Producer

- Predator (1987)
- Three O'Clock High (1987) (co-producer)
- License to Drive (1988)
- Little Monsters (1989)
- The Last of the Finest (1990)
- Enid Is Sleeping (1990)
- Predator 2 (1990)
- Shattered (1991)
- Fortress (1992)
- Gunmen (1993)
- The Firm (1993)
- The Thing Called Love (1993)
- Grumpy Old Men (1993)
- Richie Rich (1994)
- The Hunted (1995)
- Waterworld (1995)
- The Grass Harp (1995)
- Grumpier Old Men (1995)
- Courage Under Fire (1996)
- The Chamber (1996)
- Daylight (1996)
- Out to Sea (1997)
- Digging to China (1997)
- Dr. Dolittle (1998)
- Dudley Do-Right (1999)
- Heartbreakers (2001)
- Dr. Dolittle 2 (2001)
- Behind Enemy Lines (2001)
- Life or Something Like It (2002)
- Daddy Day Care (2003)
- Paycheck (2003)
- Garfield: The Movie (2004)
- I, Robot (2004)
- Alien vs. Predator (2004)
- First Daughter (2004)
- Fat Albert (2004)
- Flight of the Phoenix (2004)
- When a Stranger Calls (2006)
- Garfield: A Tail of Two Kitties (2006)
- Eragon (2006)
- Norbit (2007)
- Aliens vs. Predator: Requiem (2007)
- Marmaduke (2010)
- Predators (2010)
- Gulliver's Travels (2010)
- A Little Bit of Heaven (2011)
- Mr. Popper's Penguins (2011)
- Chronicle (2012)
- Devil's Due (2014)
- The Man from U.N.C.L.E. (2015)
- Victor Frankenstein (2015)
- Joy (2015)
- Ferdinand (2017)
- Game Night (2018)
- The Predator (2018)
- Shaft (2019)
- Dolemite Is My Name (2019)
- Jungle Cruise (2021)
- Prey (2022)
- Harold and the Purple Crayon (2024)
- Uglies (2024)
- Flight Risk (2025)
- Predator: Killer of Killers (2025)
- The Pickup (2025)
- Predator: Badlands (2025)
- Song Sung Blue (2025)
- Being Eddie (2025)
- 72 Hours (2026)
- The Sims (TBA)

Executive producer

- Storyville (1992)
- Denise Calls Up (1995)
- Lewis and Clark and George (1997)
- Bad Manners (1997)
- The Settlement (1999)
- Rites of Passage (1999)
- Labor Pains (2000) (Co-executive producer)
- 29 Palms (2002)
- Happy Hour (2003)
- At Last (2005)
- Daddy Day Camp (2007)
- The Heartbreak Kid (2007)
- The Express: The Ernie Davis Story (2008)
- Our House (2018)

Special thanks

- Texasville (1990)

=== Direct-to-video ===
Producer

- Devil's Pond (2003)
- Dr. Dolittle 3 (2006)
- Garfield Gets Real (2007)
- Garfield's Fun Fest (2008)
- Dr. Dolittle: Million Dollar Mutts (2009)
- Garfield's Pet Force (2009)

Executive producer

- Behind Enemy Lines II: Axis of Evil (2006)
- Dr. Dolittle: Tail to the Chief (2008)
- Behind Enemy Lines: Colombia (2009)

=== Television series ===
Executive producer

- Wild Card (1992)
- The Blacklist (2013−23)
- Ironside (2013)
- The Player (2015)
- Dr. Ken (2015−17)
- Timeless (2016−18)
- The Blacklist: Redemption (2017)
- Alex, Inc. (2018)
- Magnum P.I. (2018−24)
- The Equalizer (since 2021)
- Rebel (2021)
- Blockbuster (2022)
- Laid (2024)

Producer

- Locke & Key (2011)

Production supervisor

- The Two Mrs. Grenvilles (1987)

=== Television films ===
Executive producer

- Dangerous Passion (1990)
- Curiosity Kills (1990)
- Silhouette (1990)
- Caught in the Act (1993)
- This Can't Be Love (1994)
- Asteroid (1997)
- Volcano: Fire on the Mountain (1997)
- Miracle at Midnight (1998)
- The Jesse Ventura Story (1999)
- Little Richard (2000)
- Bobbie's Girl (2002)
- Nadine in Date Land (2005)
- Life Is Ruff (2005)
- Jump In! (2007)

Producer

- Voyage (1993)
- The Last Outlaw (1993)
- Tears and Laughter: The Joan and Melissa Rivers Story (1994)
- One Christmas (1994)
- Kidnapped (1995)

Production manager

- Doomsday Gun (1994)
