= Barbara Davis =

American billionare philanthropist (born 1930)

- Born: Barbara Levine; October 9, 1930 (age 96); New York City, U.S.
- Education: Adelphi University
- Occupation: Philanthropist
- Spouse: Marvin Davis (m. 1951; died 2004)
- Children: Patricia Davis Raynes; John Davis; Nancy Davis Rickel; Gregg Davis; Dana Davis
- Relatives: Jason Davis (grandson)

Barbara Davis (née Levine; born October 9, 1930) is an American billionaire philanthropist. She is the widow of industrialist Marvin Davis.

== Biography ==
=== Early life ===
Born Barbara Levine in New York City in 1930, she graduated from Adelphi University in Garden City, New York, in 1951.

=== Philanthropy ===
In 1977, she established the Children's Diabetes Foundation. Since 1978, she has organized the black-tie, invitation-only Carousel of Hope Ball every two years to raise money for juvenile diabetes. In particular, the proceeds go to the Barbara Davis Center for Childhood Diabetes in Aurora, Colorado and the Children's Diabetes Foundation.

She also serves on the Boards of Trustees of the Joslin Diabetes Center in Boston, Massachusetts, the Cedars-Sinai Medical Center in Los Angeles, California, the Race to Erase MS in Los Angeles, California and the Eisenhower Medical Center in Rancho Mirage, California. Additionally, she is a member of the Blue Ribbon Panel of the Los Angeles Music Center.

In November 1992, she received the 1992 Promise Ball Humanitarian Award from the Juvenile Diabetes Foundation International in New York City (JDRF). In 1995, she received an Honorary Doctorate in Humane Letters from the University of Colorado. In 2004, she received the Angel Award from the Juvenile Diabetes Research Foundation in Los Angeles.

=== Personal life ===
She married Marvin Davis (1925–2004) in 1951. They had five children:

- Patricia Davis Raynes.
- John Davis.
- Nancy Davis Rickel (married Nebil Zarif; they had three sons: actor Jason Davis (1984–2020), Brandon Davis and Alexander Davis; they divorced and she remarried to Ken Rickel; they had two daughters: Isabella Rickel and Mariella Rickel).
- Gregg Davis (married actress Kim Richards; they had two children: Whitney Davis (born 1990) and Chad Davis (born 1991); they later divorced).
- Dana Davis.

They resided in Denver, Colorado, from 1951 to 1985. In 1985, they moved to The Knoll, an estate in Beverly Hills, California. Shortly after his death, she sold it for $46 million and moved into a bungalow at the Beverly Hills Hotel. Additionally, in 2011, she listed a condominium she owned in the Wilshire Corridor in Westwood, Los Angeles.

In 2006, she was worth $2.5 billion.
