= Joseph Steven Yang =

South Korean-American actor, writer and producer (born 1968)

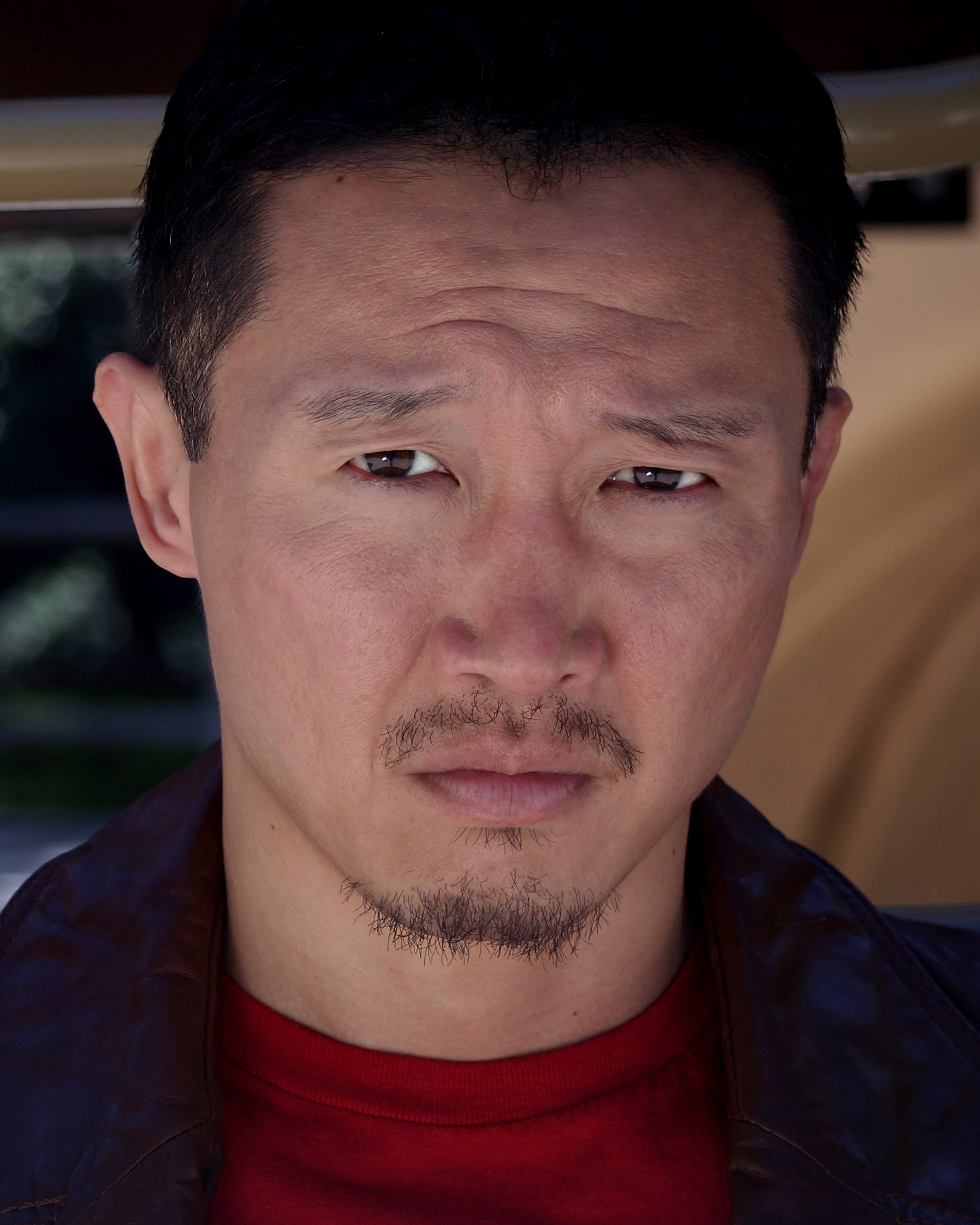
- Born: 13 October 1968 (age 56); Seoul, South Korea
- Occupation(s): Actor, writer, producer
- Years active: 2005–present

Joseph Steven Yang (born 13 October 1968) is a South Korean-American actor, writer and producer.

== Filmography ==
=== Film ===
Year	Title	Role	Notes
2005	Memoirs of a Geisha	Spa Patron	Uncredited
2006	Behind Enemy Lines II: Axis of Evil	Commander Hwang	
2007	Eli's Liquor Store	Min Park	
2007	A Life That Matters	Kyung Ho Lee	
2008	Kissing Cousins	Buddhist Monk	
2008	Surfer, Dude	Korean Translator	
2008	Alien Raiders	Ulrich	
2012	Eden	Aqua	
2014	B.F.E.	Mr. Yu	
2018	Sadie	Mr. Lee	
2022	Bilbo and the Legend of the Last Living Cow	Honorable Dennis	
2025	G20	Lee Young-Ho	Post-production

=== Television ===
Year	Title	Role	Notes
2006	Gilmore Girls	Korean Minister	Episode: "I Get a Sidekick Out of You"
2007, 2008	Talkshow with Spike Feresten	Korean Newscaster / Crazy Korean	2 episodes
2008	Zoey 101	Mr. Roker	Episode: "Goodbye Zoey?"
2019	The Passage	Chinese Official	Episode: "Last Lesson"
2019	MacGyver	Director Huang	Episode: "Treason + Heartbreak + Gum"
2019	Bigger	Store Owner	Episode: "Smack My Ass Like You Mean It"
2019	Black Lightning	Older Asian Man	6 episodes
2021	Creepshow	Ishido Tsuburaya	Episode: "The Last Tsuburaya"
2022	Cobra Kai	Korean Board Member	Episode: "Taikai"
2022	A Friend of the Family	George Hong	Episode: "The Gift of Tongues"
2023	True Lies	Professor	Episode: "Public Secrets"
2024	Shadrach	Archaeologist	Episode: "The Heir of All Things"
