= Behind Enemy Lines II: Axis of Evil =

- DVD cover
- Directed by: James Dodson
- Written by: James Dodson
- Produced by: Roee Sharon; James Dodson
- Starring: Nicholas Gonzalez; Matt Bushell; Keith David; Denis Arndt; Ben Cross; Bruce McGill; Peter Coyote
- Cinematography: Lorenzo Senatore
- Edited by: Ethan Maniquis
- Music by: Pinar Toprak
- Distributed by: 20th Century Fox Home Entertainment
- Release date: October 17, 2006
- Running time: 96 minutes
- Country: United States
- Language: English

Behind Enemy Lines II: Axis of Evil is a 2006 American action war film and the sequel to 2001's Behind Enemy Lines, it is the second installment in the Behind Enemy Lines film series. The film was written and directed by James Dodson, starring Nicholas Gonzalez, Matt Bushell, Keith David, Denis Arndt, Ben Cross, Bruce McGill and Peter Coyote. The film was released direct-to-video on October 17, 2006.

== Plot ==
The story is not linked to the first part of the series. Instead, it focuses on a fictional explanation for the Ryanggang explosion in 2004, in which an unexplained mushroom cloud occurred in North Korea.

After reconnaissance satellites detect a large, three-stage Topol intercontinental ballistic missile carrying a nuclear weapon in North Korea, which can strike anywhere in the continental United States, United States President Adair T. Manning (Peter Coyote) orders a team of U.S. Navy SEALs, led by Lieutenant Robert James (Nicholas Gonzalez), to destroy the missile and the launch site.

The Pentagon aborts the mission after receiving new information, but by the time the abort order is sent, two SEALs have already parachuted into North Korean territory. James stops the third SEAL from deploying, accidentally knocking the man's helmet against the status indicator mounted near the door. He steps onto the makeshift ramp to peer outside, returning to the doorway to inform the other men of the abort. The high-speed winds from outside rip the indicator loose and send it flying into his face. Stumbling backwards, James loses his balance and is blown out of the plane. Master Chief Neil T. "Spaz" Callaghan (Matt Bushell) disobeys orders to stand fast, strikes his commanding officer, and follows the first three, taking a radio with him. When North Korean forces led by Commander Hwang (Joseph Steven Yang) find the SEALs, they kill two in a gun battle, and Hwang and his men capture and torture James and Callaghan.

After South Korean special forces rescue the pair, President Manning and the South Korean government send the SEALs and South Korean special forces to destroy the missile site. But after losing radio contact with the SEALs, the President and his top advisers believe that they have been captured again. Under pressure from his Chairman of the Joint Chiefs of Staff, US Air Force General Norman T. Vance (Bruce McGill), the President decides to send B-2 stealth bombers to destroy the site, which would start a full-scale war against North Korea. Hwang almost recaptures the SEALs and the South Korean special forces, but a defecting officer shoots him. James and the South Koreans destroy the missile silo with a bomb before the bombers reach the missile site, which averts the bombing and prevents a full-scale war.

A tribunal convicts Callaghan of striking an officer (1 year) and disobeying an officer (10 years). Due to the mission's "black op" nature, the transcript of the hearing is deemed classified and the charges are expunged from his record, freeing him to return to his family.

Meanwhile, James meets the president in a classified meeting, bringing his mentor Master Chief Scott Boytano (Keith David) to witness James receive an award. The film closes with Boytano telling James he was not red flagged because Boytano had never seen anyone who desired so badly as James did to be a SEAL. During the credits there is a news report on the Ryanggang explosion.

== Cast ==
- Nicholas Gonzalez as Lieutenant Robert James, USN
- Matt Bushell as Master Chief Neil T. "Spaz" Callaghan, USN
- Bruce McGill as General Norman T. Vance, USAF, Chairman of the Joint Chiefs of Staff
- Denis Arndt as CIA Director Weylon Armitage
- Peter Coyote as President Adair T. Manning
- April Grace as Secretary of State Ellie Brilliard
- Glenn Morshower as Admiral Henry D. Wheeler, USN
- Joseph Steven Yang as Commander Hwang
- Kenneth Choi as Ambassador Li Sung Park
- Keith David as Master Chief Scott Boytano, USN
- Ben Cross as Commander Tim Mackey, USN
- Mykel Shannon Jenkins as Chief Warrant Officer Lawrence Meideros, USN
- Laura Giosh as Annabelle

== Precursor ==
The film followed on the footsteps of a previously released title: Behind Enemy Lines, starring Owen Wilson. Although the basic theme is credited to the first film, the plot and setting are not interlinked between either films.

== Sequels ==
It was followed by two direct-to-video sequels, Behind Enemy Lines: Colombia, which stars the professional wrestler Ken Anderson, and SEAL Team 8: Behind Enemy Lines, which stars Tom Sizemore.

== See also ==
- List of films featuring the United States Navy SEALs
