= SEAL Team 8: Behind Enemy Lines =

- DVD cover
- Directed by: Roel Reiné
- Screenplay by: Shane Kuhn; Brendan Cowles
- Story by: Roel Reiné
- Produced by: David Wicht
- Starring: Tom Sizemore; Lex Shrapnel; Anthony Oseyemi; Michael Everson; Darron Meyer; Aurélie Meriel; Colin Moss; Langley Kirkwood; Warrick Grier
- Cinematography: Roel Reiné
- Edited by: Radu Ion
- Music by: Mark Kilian
- Distributed by: 20th Century Fox Home Entertainment
- Release date: April 1, 2014
- Running time: 98 minutes
- Country: United States
- Language: English

SEAL Team 8: Behind Enemy Lines is a 2014 American action war film directed by Roel Reiné and starring Tom Sizemore. It is the fourth installment in the Behind Enemy Lines film series. The film was released on direct-to-video and Blu-ray on April 1, 2014.

== Plot ==
While on an unsanctioned covert mission in Africa, a small team of Navy SEALs uncovers intelligence pointing to the imminent sale of a massive quantity of weapons grade uranium. Now, with no mission prep and zero support, they have less than 36 hours to fight their way past a ruthless warlord's army guarding this secret mining operation, hidden deep in the treacherous Congo, in order to secure the yellowcake and expose the unknown buyer. As the story moves along, the asset that the SEAL team was asked to secure turns out to be the warlord. With three of the team members lost and one taken by the adversaries, Case fights his way into their nest to save his teammate and give the enemy a withering end.

== Cast ==
- Tom Sizemore as Ricks
- Lex Shrapnel as Case
- Anthony Oseyemi as Jay
- Michael Everson as Bubba
- Darron Meyer as Vic
- Aurélie Meriel as Zoe Jelani
- Colin Moss as Dan
- Langley Kirkwood as Lieutenant Parker
- Warrick Grier as Pat
- Tanya van Graan as Collins
- Bonnie Lee Bouman as Officer
- Eugene Wanangwa Khumbanyiwa as Arms Cache Manager
- Sebelethu Bonkolo as Village Boy
- Keeno Lee Hector as Drone Pilot
- Glen Biderman-Pam as Second Drone Pilot
- Leroy Gopal as General Ntonga

== Production ==
The film takes place in Congo and was shot in South Africa.

== Release ==
The film was released on April 1, 2014.

== See also ==
- List of films featuring the United States Navy SEALs
