= Ken Anderson (wrestler) =

American professional wrestler (born 1976)

Mr Kennedy
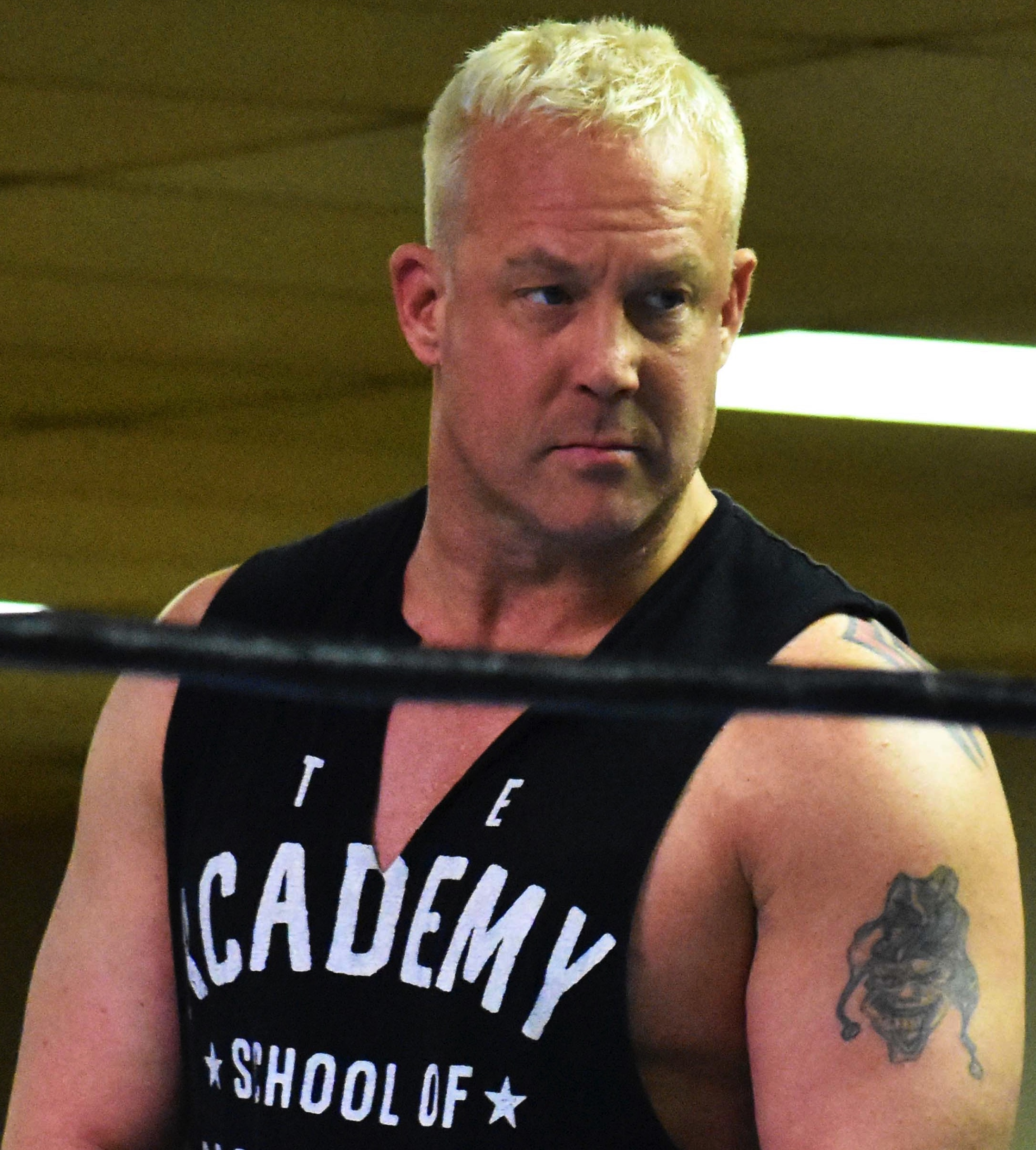
- Anderson in 2019

Personal information
- Born: Kenneth Anthony Anderson; March 6, 1976 (age 50) Wisconsin Rapids, Wisconsin, U.S.
- Spouses: Shawn Trebnick (m. 2008; div. 2016); Anastasia Anderson (m. 2018)
- Children: 2

Professional wrestling career
- Ring name(s): Kamikaze Ken; Ken Anderson; Ken Kennedy; Mr. Anderson; Mr. Kennedy; Two Rivers Jack
- Billed height: 6 ft 2 in (188 cm)
- Billed weight: 235 lb (107 kg)
- Billed from: Green Bay, Wisconsin
- Trained by: Eric Hammers; Mike Mercury
- Debut: 1999

Kenneth Anthony Anderson (born March 6, 1976) is an American professional wrestler. He is signed to WWE, under a Legends contract. He is best known for his tenure from 2005 to 2009 under the ring name Mr. Kennedy. He is also known for his tenure in Total Nonstop Action Wrestling (TNA), as Mr. Anderson from 2010 to 2016. He also works as an announcer for Top Rank Boxing.

Before signing a development deal with World Wrestling Entertainment (WWE) and being assigned to Ohio Valley Wrestling, WWE's farm area, Anderson began his career on the independent circuit. He was promoted to the main roster in 2005. One year after his debut, he won the WWE United States Championship, which he held for 42 days. At WrestleMania 23, he won the 2007 Money in the Bank briefcase with a title shot for the promotion's world title. However, he dropped the briefcase to Edge after being misdiagnosed with an injury. Kennedy would remain with the promotion until 2009.

In 2010, Anderson signed with TNA, where he competed under the ring names Mr. Anderson and Ken Anderson. In 2011, he would win the TNA World Heavyweight Championship twice during a feud with the villainous group Immortal. After losing the title, he would remain with the promotion as a mid-card wrestler, joining the villainous faction Aces & Eights at one point, until he departed TNA in 2016. In 2019, Anderson came back to pro wrestling programming when he worked for National Wrestling Alliance (NWA). In September 2025, Anderson officially returned to TNA after 9 years away from the promotion. In November 2026, Anderson signed a Legends contract with WWE.

In 2016, Anderson opened a wrestling school called The Academy in Minneapolis, Minnesota, along with Shawn Daivari, Molly Holly, Ariya Daivari, and Arik Cannon. He has also worked occasionally as an actor and starred as Master Chief Petty Officer Carter Holt in the WWE Studios production Behind Enemy Lines: Colombia in 2009.

== Early life ==
Kenneth Anthony Anderson was born on March 6, 1976, in Wisconsin Rapids, Wisconsin. Anderson graduated from Washington High School in Two Rivers. During his time there, he excelled at swimming and track and field. He also announced school basketball games and did a radio assignment in his Mass Media class. When doing this, a friend suggested to Anderson to repeat the surnames to make it funnier. That element was eventually used again in his wrestling character when encouraged by Paul Heyman. Before beginning his wrestling career, Anderson worked as a security officer at Point Beach Nuclear Power Plant and a personal trainer. He also served in the United States Army. His father died on April 13, 2006, from cancer.

== Professional wrestling career ==
=== Early career (1999–2005) ===
Anderson, under the ring name "Two Rivers Jack", made his debut on September 11, 1999, at a North American Wrestling Federation event in Whitewater, Wisconsin, losing to Golga. He wrestled just twenty-one matches before appearing for the World Wrestling Federation on Jakked in 2001, where he lost to Essa Rios. He occasionally worked as enhancement talent for WWF/WWE from 2001 to 2004 when shows ran in Wisconsin. Anderson also made an appearance on NWA: Total Nonstop Action's secondary television program, Xplosion. The owner of the promotion, Jeff Jarrett, approached him for a contract but communications broke down.

=== World Wrestling Entertainment (2005–2009) ===
==== Ohio Valley Wrestling (2005) ====
Upon signing with WWE in February 2005, Anderson was sent to the Ohio Valley Wrestling (OVW) developmental territory, where he would remain for six months. When he arrived, Jim Cornette was in charge of the organization and, according to Anderson, did not see potential in his abilities and declined to feature him as more than an occasional bit-player on OVW's programming. When Cornette departed, his replacement, Paul Heyman, showed immediate interest in Anderson, comparing his qualities to The Rock and Stone Cold Steve Austin. Five weeks later, Anderson was called up to WWE's main roster to work on Velocity. He credits Heyman with helping him develop the character with which he would achieve success. Before his first SmackDown! match, he showed himself to be a cocky and arrogant wrestler by taking a microphone and performing his own ring announcement. He referred to himself as "Mr. Anderson" for this match. A few weeks later, to avoid comparisons with the more famous Anderson family (as well as former Cincinnati Bengals quarterback Ken Anderson), he changed his name "Ken Kennedy", to "Mr. Kennedy". The change was initially suggested by Heyman and was chosen because it is the middle name of WWE Chairman Vince McMahon.

==== Undefeated streak (2005–2006) ====
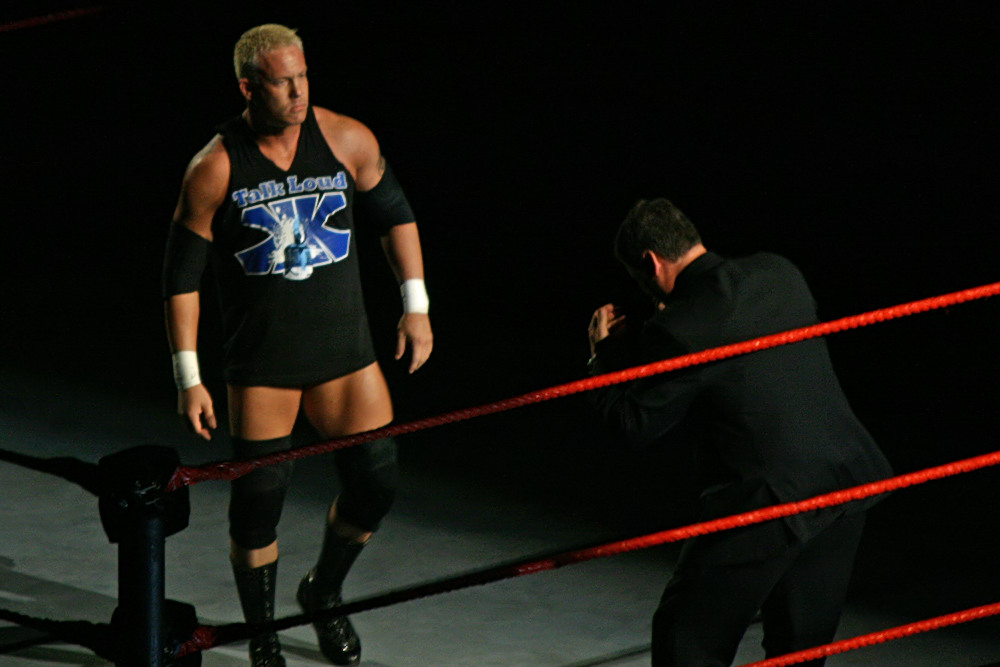
Kennedy taunting ring announcer Tony Chimel

Kennedy, as a heel, defeated Funaki in his SmackDown! debut on August 25. Kennedy also created an ongoing mini-feud with SmackDown! ring announcer Tony Chimel based on Kennedy believing that Chimel's announcing was not done well enough or with sufficient respect, and therefore performing his own introductions or forcing Chimel to introduce him again. Kennedy's self-ring introductions before the match became one of his trademarks. While working on both Velocity and SmackDown!, he was also still working in OVW. Kennedy made his pay-per-view debut at No Mercy on October 9, defeating Hardcore Holly and injuring Holly's ribs during the match.

On the November 11 episode of SmackDown!, Kennedy faced Eddie Guerrero to compete for a spot on Team SmackDown! at Survivor Series on November 27. He lost the match when Guerrero tossed him a steel chair and played possum, a move which Guerrero had made famous. The referee turned around and saw Guerrero on the ground with Kennedy holding the chair, and consequently disqualified Kennedy, awarding the place on Team SmackDown! to Guerrero. This was Kennedy's first loss. In retaliation, Kennedy struck Guerrero over the head with the chair after the match. This was Guerrero's final televised match, as he died two days later. In interviews about the incident, Kennedy has stated that he considers this an "unfortunate honor".

In December, Kennedy participated in WWE's overseas tour. On the second day in Italy, Kennedy suffered a legitimate latissimus dorsi tear. Kennedy was sidelined for nearly six months while he rehabilitated the injury. He continued to make appearances on SmackDown! and Velocity throughout January and February and even made an appearance on the January 11, 2006, episode of WWE Byte This! with Todd Grisham to maintain visibility.

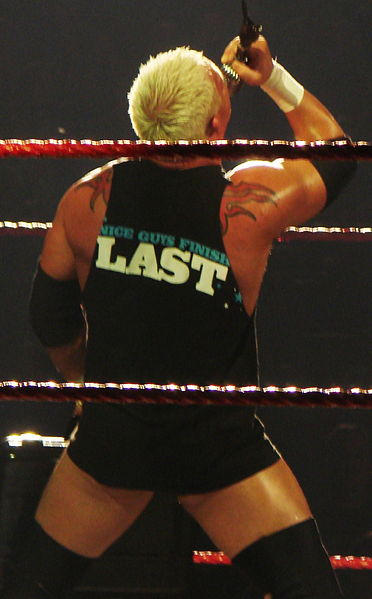
Mr. Kennedy's trademark ring announcement

At the OVW tapings on May 17, Kennedy returned to in-ring action, facing OVW Heavyweight Champion CM Punk in a title match that Kennedy lost. Kennedy made his return to SmackDown! on the June 9 episode with a victory over Scotty 2 Hotty after using the "Kenton Bomb". On the July 14 episode of SmackDown!, Matt Hardy used a roll-up to defeat Kennedy, ending Kennedy's streak of never being defeated by pin or submission. On the July 21 episode of SmackDown!, Batista put out an open challenge to find an opponent for The Great American Bash on July 23, as his original opponent, Mark Henry, had been injured. Kennedy accepted the challenge and won the match by disqualification, however, he suffered an injury during the match after being thrown headfirst into the steel steps, resulting in an exposed cranium laceration which required twenty stitches to close. Kennedy helped Vince and Shane McMahon in their feud with D-Generation X (DX), appearing at both SummerSlam on August 20 and the August 28 episode of Raw to attack them.

==== United States Champion and Mr. Money in the Bank (2006–2007) ====
On the September 1 episode of SmackDown!, Kennedy defeated Finlay and Bobby Lashley in a triple threat match to win the WWE United States Championship, his first and only championship reign in WWE. On the September 8 episode of SmackDown!, Kennedy announced that he wanted to move over to the Raw brand, as SmackDown! did not interest him anymore since he had already defeated every top performer on the roster. This led to SmackDown! General Manager Theodore Long making a match between Kennedy and The Undertaker, who Kennedy had never faced, to be held at No Mercy on October 8. Kennedy won the match by disqualification after The Undertaker hit him with the United States Championship belt. On the October 13 episode of SmackDown!, Kennedy, now with a win over The Undertaker, again stated his desire to move to Raw. However, Long again put him against an opponent who he had never faced—this time Chris Benoit—with the United States Championship on the line. Long said that if Kennedy were to defeat Benoit, he would be given his release and be allowed to go to Raw. Ultimately, Kennedy lost the match and the United States Championship to Benoit after submitting to the "Crippler Crossface" following a distraction by The Undertaker.

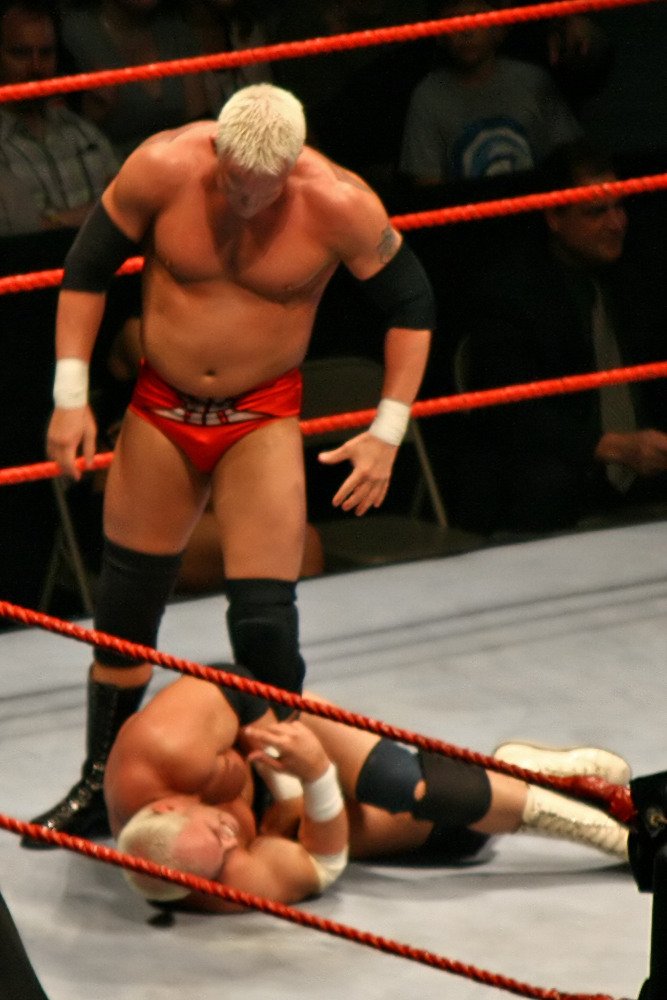
Mr. Kennedy standing over Hardcore Holly at a Raw house show

In November, Kennedy joined forces with Montel Vontavious Porter (MVP) in matches against Brothers of Destruction (The Undertaker and Kane). On the November 3 episode of SmackDown!, Kennedy and MVP lost to the Brothers of Destruction three times. After first getting counted out, Theodore Long restarted the match with no countouts. When Kennedy disqualified his team by performing a low blow, Long restarted the match again with no countouts and no disqualifications. Kennedy and MVP continued to feud with the two, with MVP feuding with Kane while Kennedy challenged The Undertaker to a match at Survivor Series on November 26, which was later announced as a First Blood match. Kennedy defeated The Undertaker at Survivor Series after MVP turned on Kennedy and aimed for his head with a steel chair, but missed and hit The Undertaker instead, leaving The Undertaker bleeding. After the match, The Undertaker attacked Kennedy, forcing him to bleed. At Armageddon on December 17, Kennedy and The Undertaker met in a final match; they were scheduled in a Last Ride match. In the match, The Undertaker defeated Kennedy.

After a brief hiatus, Kennedy returned to SmackDown! on January 5, 2007, and defeated Chris Benoit in a "Beat the Clock" match, with the overall prize being a shot at Batista's World Heavyweight Championship at the Royal Rumble on January 28. After he prevented The Undertaker from beating his time, Kennedy's time of 5:07 ended up being the fastest. At the Royal Rumble, he lost to Batista, as well as a subsequent rematch on the February 9 episode of SmackDown!. From there, Kennedy began a short feud with ECW World Champion Bobby Lashley, leading to a match at No Way Out on February 18 for the ECW World Championship, which Kennedy won by disqualification after Lashley hit him with a chair. Kennedy challenged Lashley unsuccessfully for the ECW World Championship on the February 20 episode of ECW (a triple threat match also involving Hardcore Holly) and the March 2 episode of SmackDown! as well.

Kennedy earned a spot in the 2007 Money in the Bank ladder match by defeating Sabu in an Extreme Rules match on the February 27 episode of ECW. At WrestleMania 23 on April 1, Kennedy won the Money in the Bank ladder match, giving him the right to challenge any world champion in WWE at any date up until WrestleMania XXIV on March 30, 2008. Kennedy announced on the April 30 episode of Raw that he would be cashing in his Money in the Bank championship opportunity in eleven months at WrestleMania XXIV. On the May 7 episode of Raw, Kennedy, however, lost his Money in the Bank briefcase to Edge, after being struck with a monitor before the match began. Kennedy had sustained an injury prior to his match with Edge, and it was thought that his right triceps muscle tore off the bone and he would be out for a minimum of five to seven months, leading to the decision to transfer the briefcase in lieu of the original plan of having him cash it in against the World Heavyweight Champion, The Undertaker, following a steel cage match, as he needed time away for bicep surgery. The injury, however, was not as serious as initially thought, as the triceps tendon did not tear off the bone but was, in fact, a massive hematoma, which would keep him out for only five to seven weeks.

On the June 11 episode of Raw, Kennedy was drafted to the Raw brand as part of the WWE Draft. On the August 20 episode of Raw, Carlito hosted the interview segment Carlito's Cabana. During the segment, Carlito challenged his guest, Umaga for his Intercontinental Championship at SummerSlam on August 26, and Kennedy also demanded a shot at the title. Raw General Manager William Regal, scheduled a match between Kennedy and Carlito, in which the winner would receive an opportunity to face off against Umaga at SummerSlam. After the match ended in a draw, Regal booked a triple threat match at SummerSlam between the three men for the Intercontinental Championship; at SummerSlam, Umaga retained the title. On the September 10 episode of Raw, Mr. McMahon revealed that Kennedy had, in storyline, been suspended for "impersonating a McMahon." This angle was written because Kennedy being named one of the eleven wrestlers implicated in a steroid scandal and therefore suspended for thirty days in accordance with WWE's Wellness Policy.

==== Final feuds (2007–2009) ====
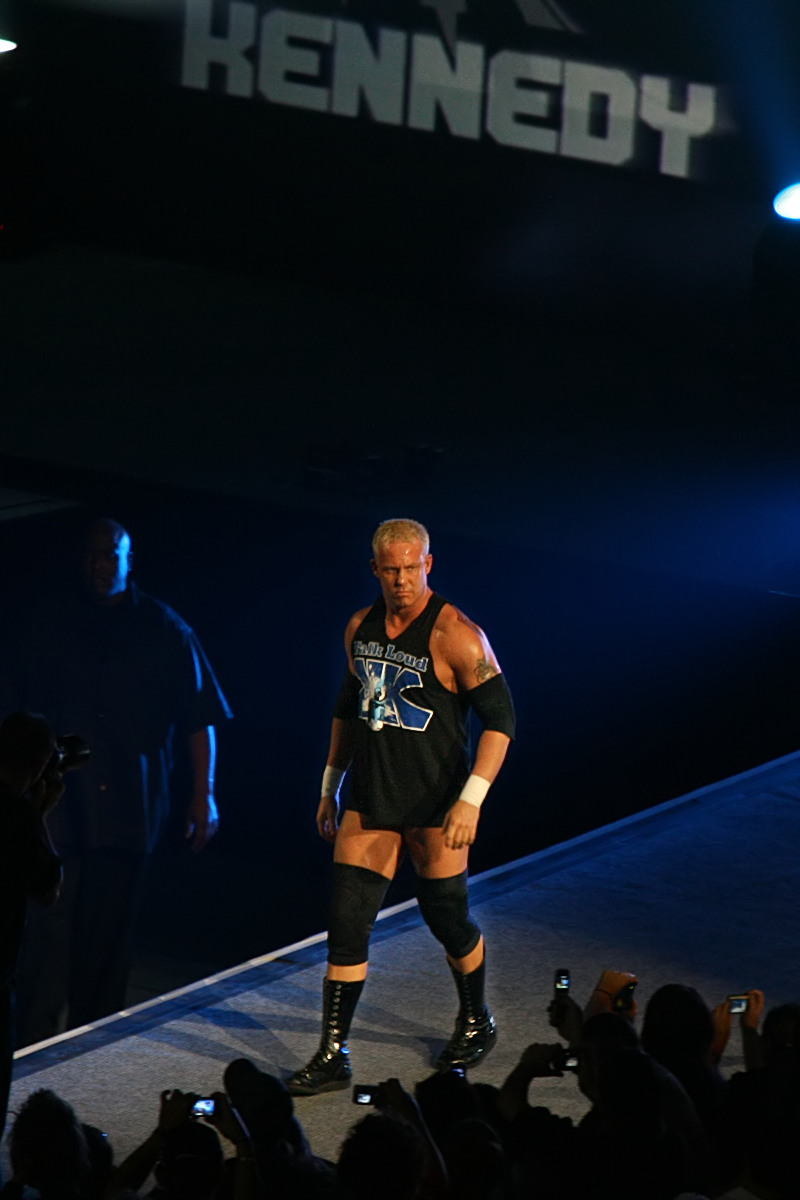
Kennedy making his ring entrance at a Raw house show in 2007

After his suspension, Kennedy returned to television on the October 1 episode of Raw, facing John Cena in the main event and losing. At No Mercy on October 7, Kennedy took part in a six-man tag team match alongside World Tag Team Champions Lance Cade and Trevor Murdoch, defeating Paul London, Brian Kendrick and Intercontinental Champion Jeff Hardy. For several weeks, Kennedy began a feud with Hardy, which consisted of the two facing off in a singles match and numerous tag team matches, most of which Hardy won. At Cyber Sunday on October 28, Kennedy and Hardy were two of the eligible wrestlers that could earn a WWE Championship match that evening, pending a fan votes. Neither man won the opportunity, as Shawn Michaels won the vote and earned a shot at the title. Kennedy defeated Hardy at Cyber Sunday.

Kennedy next entered a feud with Michaels on the November 19 episode of Raw. Kennedy claimed that it was time for Michaels to move on and let the younger wrestlers achieve success. At Armageddon on December 16, Michaels defeated Kennedy by executing "Sweet Chin Music". On the December 31 episode of Raw, Kennedy pinned Michaels in a rematch by executing his new finishing move, the "Mic Check". In subsequent rematches, the two traded wins over each other.

After several months of minor feuds and short storylines, Kennedy was not seen for weeks after WrestleMania XXIV because he was filming Behind Enemy Lines: Colombia. Kennedy returned to Raw on April 28, 2008, confronting and brawling with Raw General Manager and newly crowned King of the Ring William Regal, turning face in the process. On the May 19 episode of Raw, Kennedy defeated Regal in a "Loser Gets Fired match", thereby opening up the General Manager spot on the Raw brand.

During the WWE Draft on June 23 on Raw, Kennedy was drafted to the SmackDown brand. On August 4, he dislocated his shoulder in a match against Shelton Benjamin at a house show, keeping him off television for three months. Kennedy made his return to WWE television, in a non-wrestling capacity, on the November 24 episode of Raw, promoting Behind Enemy Lines: Colombia.

On April 15, 2009, Mr. Kennedy was drafted back to the Raw brand as the brand's first pick of the 2009 Supplemental Draft. On the May 11 episode of Raw, WWE aired a video package to promote Kennedy's return. He made his official Raw return two weeks later, competing in a 10-man tag team match, which his team won.

Kennedy was released from his WWE contract on May 29, just four days after his return. In a March 2010 interview with WrestleZone, Anderson explained that his release was due to fellow wrestler Randy Orton complaining to WWE management that Kennedy was reckless in the ring, citing a botched backdrop that caused Orton to land on his head and neck instead of on his back. Orton argued that this could have potentially ended his career. According to Kennedy, Orton also persuaded John Cena to complain to Vince McMahon about Kennedy's in-ring performance, which prompted McMahon to release Kennedy from his contract.

=== Independent circuit (2009–2010) ===
In his first interview since his release, Kennedy expressed to 540 ESPN Radio in Milwaukee his interest in joining Total Nonstop Action Wrestling (TNA). Kennedy appeared at World Wrestling Council's 2009 Anniversary show, where he lost to Eddie Fatu. After a number of matches in independent promotions, he competed on the Hulkamania: Let The Battle Begin tour in Australia. Under the ring name Mr. Anderson, he again worked matches with Fatu, the latter's final matches before his unexpected death on December 4.

=== Total Nonstop Action Wrestling (2010–2016) ===
==== TNA World Heavyweight Champion (2010–2011) ====
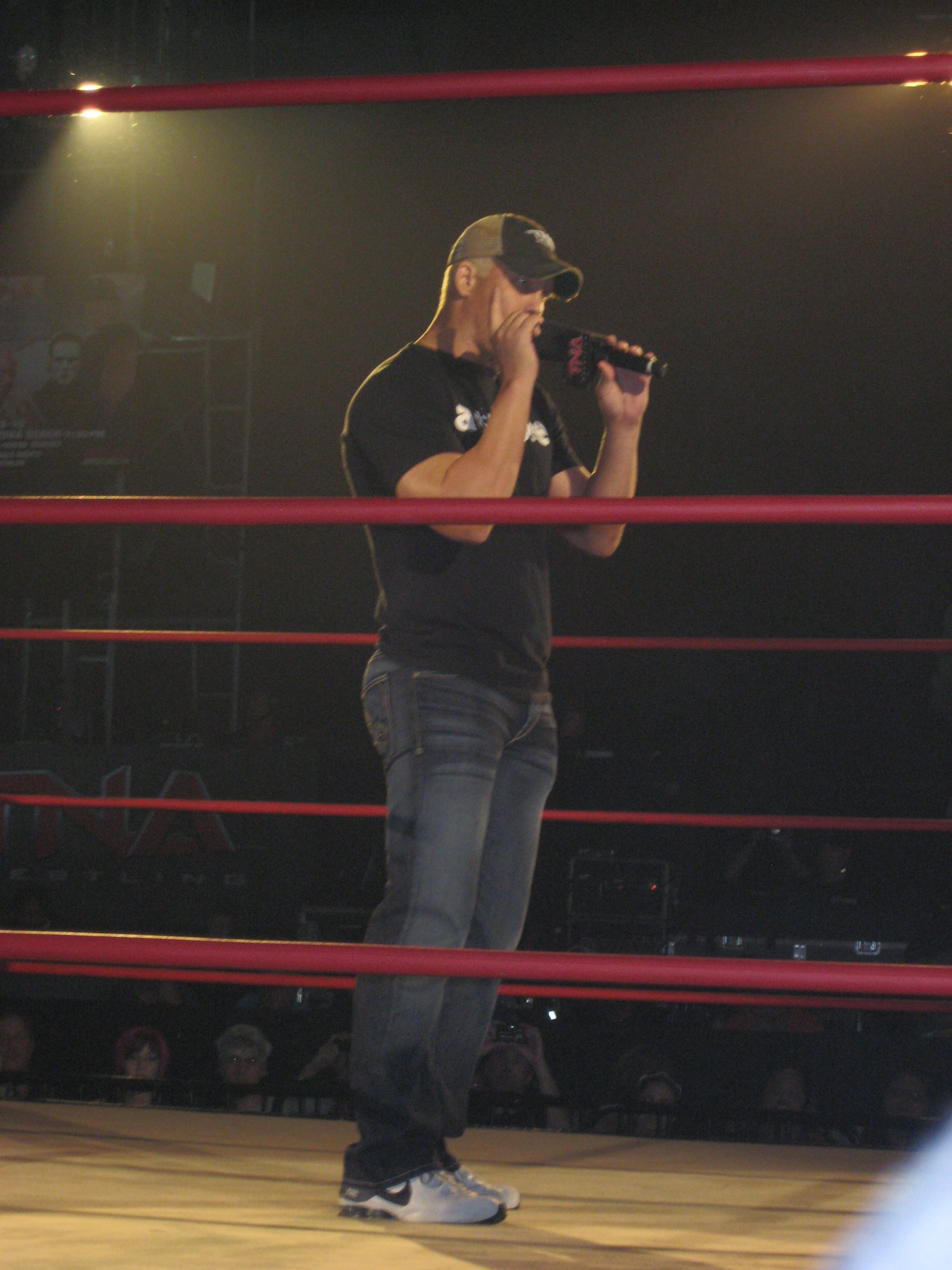
Mr. Anderson at a TNA event in 2010

In January 2010, Anderson signed a one-year deal with Total Nonstop Action Wrestling (TNA). He made his debut for TNA at the Genesis pay-per-view on January 17, working under the ring name Mr. Anderson. As a mystery opponent, he wrestled Abyss, whom he pinned after using brass knuckles, establishing himself as a heel in the process. Anderson made his Impact! debut on January 21, delivering a promo on and being attacked by Abyss.

At Against All Odds on February 14, Anderson defeated Kurt Angle and Abyss to advance to the finals of the 8 Card Stud Tournament, where he lost to D'Angelo Dinero. On the following edition of Impact!, Angle, whom Anderson had defeated by hitting him with dog tags, accused him of disrespecting U.S. soldiers, which led to Anderson hitting him with a mic, effectively starting a feud between the two. At Destination X on March 21, Angle defeated Anderson by submission. Afterwards, Anderson and Angle were booked in a steel cage match at Lockdown on April 18. On the April 5 episode of Impact!, Anderson defeated Angle in a ladder match to win possession of the key to the cage door to be used at Lockdown. Angle defeated Anderson in the cage match at Lockdown. At Sacrifice on May 16, Anderson was defeated by Jeff Hardy. After the match, Anderson offered to shake Hardy's hand, but Hardy declined. On the following episode of Impact!, Anderson helped Hardy defeat Sting in the main event of the show. After the match, both Anderson and Hardy were attacked by Sting. This turned Anderson face. At Slammiversary VIII on June 13, Anderson and Hardy, now known collectively as the Enigmatic Assholes, defeated Beer Money, Inc. (Robert Roode and James Storm) in a tag team match.

At Victory Road on July 11, Anderson and Hardy attempted to win the TNA World Heavyweight Championship from Rob Van Dam in a four-way match, also involving Abyss, but both were unsuccessful. On the August 19 edition of Impact!, the TNA World Heavyweight Championship was vacated and Anderson was entered into an eight-man tournament for the title, defeating Jay Lethal in the first round and D'Angelo Dinero in the semifinals at No Surrender on September 5. On September 21, TNA President Dixie Carter announced that Anderson had signed a new long-term contract with TNA. At Bound for Glory on October 10, Anderson failed in his attempt to win the TNA World Heavyweight Championship when Jeff Hardy, with the assistance of both Hulk Hogan and Eric Bischoff, pinned him in a three-way match (which also included Kurt Angle) to win the title, ending their partnership. Two weeks later, Anderson competed in a number one contender Ultimate X match against Kazarian, who won following interference from his Fortune stablemates. Anderson was blindsided by Hardy after the match, which consequently earned Anderson a title shot at Turning Point on November 7. During the attack, Anderson suffered a legitimate concussion, which kept him from taking part in the title match.

Anderson returned on the December 2 episode of Impact!, chasing Hardy and Fortune out of the ring, before being announced as the special guest referee for the title match between Hardy and Matt Morgan at Final Resolution on December 5. Anderson was bloodied and taken out of that match by Eric Bischoff, who helped Hardy retain the title after another referee replaced Anderson. On January 9, 2011, at Genesis, Anderson defeated Morgan in a number one contender's match. Immediately afterwards, Bischoff announced that Anderson would get his title match against Jeff Hardy immediately. After interference from Morgan, Mick Foley, Matt Hardy, Rob Van Dam, and Bischoff, Anderson defeated Hardy to win the TNA World Heavyweight Championship for the first time. On the February 3 episode of Impact!, Anderson defeated Hardy in a rematch for the title after Fortune turned on Immortal, who were interfering. On February 13 at Against All Odds, Anderson lost the TNA World Heavyweight Championship back to Hardy in a ladder match.

Eleven days later, Anderson defeated Kurt Angle and Rob Van Dam in a three-way match to earn a rematch for the TNA World Heavyweight Championship. Anderson was looking to get his title match on the following edition of Impact!, but it was instead given to the returning Sting, who defeated Hardy to win the TNA World Heavyweight Championship. On the March 10 edition of Impact!, Anderson attacked Sting backstage, claiming that he had been screwed out of his title match. In the main event of that show, Anderson teamed with Jeff Hardy against Rob Van Dam and Sting. During the match, Anderson took on the role of a tweener by turning on Hardy before being pinned by Van Dam. On April 17 at Lockdown, Anderson failed in his attempt to regain the TNA World Heavyweight Championship from Sting in a three-way steel cage match which also included Van Dam. On May 12, Anderson defeated 24 other men in a battle royal to earn a shot at the TNA World Heavyweight Championship at Slammiversary IX on June 12. In the weeks leading up to Slammiversary, Anderson tried to get under Sting's skin by dressing up like he did in the early 1990s during his "surfer" gimmick, attacking Disco Inferno during his own "Scorpion Sitdown" interview segment, and wrestling Eric Young, who was dressed as The Great Muta.

==== Immortal (2011–2012) ====
At Slammiversary, Anderson defeated Sting after a low blow from Eric Bischoff and a "Mic Check" to win the TNA World Heavyweight Championship for the second time, turning heel in the process. On June 18, Anderson represented TNA at Mexican promotion AAA's Triplemanía XIX pay-per-view, where he and Abyss unsuccessfully challenged Extreme Tiger and Jack Evans for the AAA World Tag Team Championship in a steel cage match. On the July 7 edition of Impact Wrestling, Anderson joined Immortal. The following week, Anderson lost the TNA World Heavyweight Championship back to Sting. On July 28, Anderson faced Angle in a steel cage match, but was defeated following a distraction from fellow Immortal member Bully Ray. The tension between the two stablemates eventually led to a match on August 7 at Hardcore Justice, where Ray defeated Anderson with a low blow. On the following edition of Impact Wrestling, the rest of Immortal turned on Anderson and kicked him out of the group. This turned Anderson face once again. Anderson returned on August 25, attacking his former stablemates. On the September 8 episode of Impact Wrestling, Anderson challenged Kurt Angle, who won the world title at Hardcore Justice, but the match ended in a disqualification due to interference from Immortal. At No Surrender on September 11, Anderson again failed to capture the title in a three-way match, which also included Sting. Anderson and Bully Ray settled their grudge on October 16 at Bound for Glory, where Anderson won a Falls Count Anywhere match. On November 13 at Turning Point, Anderson and Abyss defeated Ray and Scott Steiner in a tag team match, ending his year-long storyline with Immortal.

After a four-month absence, Anderson returned to TNA on March 8, 2012, aligning himself with A.J. Styles in his feud with Christopher Daniels and Kazarian. The following week, Anderson defeated Daniels in his return match. The rivalry continued on April 15 at Lockdown, where the two duos were on opposing teams in the annual Lethal Lockdown match. Anderson and Styles, on the team led by Garett Bischoff, defeated Daniels and Kazarian, on the team led by Eric Bischoff. On the following episode of Impact Wrestling, Anderson and Jeff Hardy were defeated by Rob Van Dam in a three-way number one contender's match for the TNA World Heavyweight Championship. During the first "Open Fight Night" the following week, Anderson teamed up with Hardy to unsuccessfully challenge Magnus and Samoa Joe for the TNA World Tag Team Championship. On June 10 at Slammiversary, Anderson defeated Hardy and Rob Van Dam in a three-way match to become the number one contender to the TNA World Heavyweight Championship. On the following edition of Impact Wrestling, Anderson unsuccessfully challenged Bobby Roode for the world championship. As a result, he was entered into the 2012 Bound for Glory Series to try to earn another shot at the title. Anderson was mathematically eliminated on August 23. On September 27, Anderson received a shot at the vacant TNA Television Championship, but was defeated by Samoa Joe via submission with the "Coquina Clutch".

==== Aces & Eights (2012–2013) ====
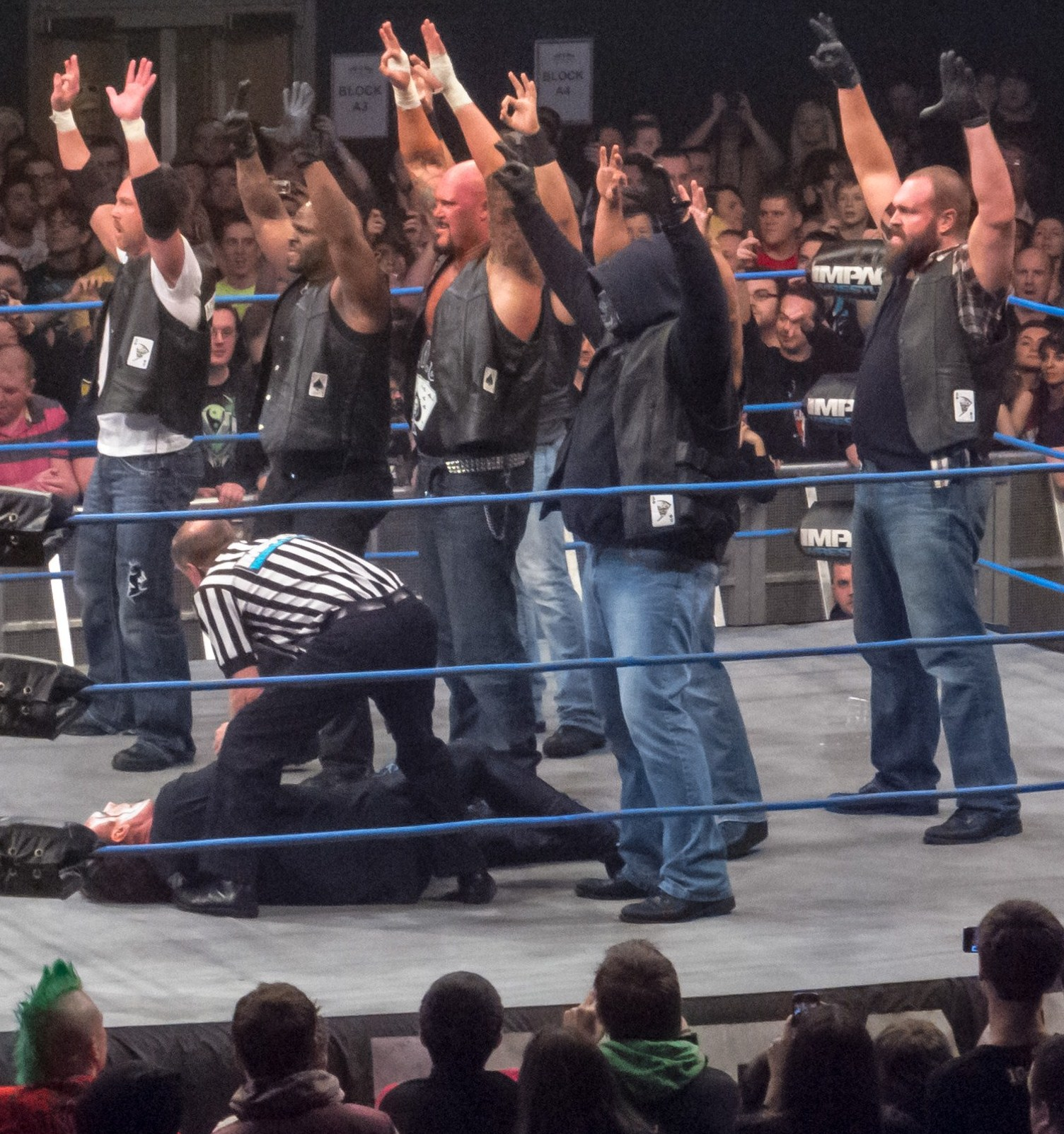
Aces & Eights in January 2013 (Anderson is far left)

After several weeks of absence, Anderson returned on the December 27 episode of Impact Wrestling, where he was offered a position in Aces & Eights, which Anderson accepted on the January 3, 2013 episode of Impact Wrestling, turning heel in the process. On the January 10 episode of Impact Wrestling, Anderson explained his joining by noting how nobody helped him when he was attacked by the Aces & Eights back in October. Anderson wrestled his return match at Genesis on January 13, defeating Samoa Joe after interference from Aces & Eights member Mike Knox. On March 10 at Lockdown, Aces & Eights—represented by Anderson, Devon, DOC, Garett Bischoff, and Mike Knox—were defeated by Team TNA—consisting of Eric Young, James Storm, Magnus, Samoa Joe, and Sting—in a Lethal Lockdown match. On June 2 at Slammiversary XI, Anderson, Bischoff, and Wes Brisco were defeated by Jeff Hardy, Magnus, and Samoa Joe in a six-man tag team match. On the following episode of Impact Wrestling, Anderson began campaigning to be the new Vice President of the Aces & Eights. The following week, Anderson defeated his fellow Aces & Eights stablemates in a battle royal to qualify for the 2013 Bound for Glory Series. Anderson defeated Joseph Park in his first BFG series match via pinfall on the June 20 episode of Impact Wrestling to earn seven points in the tournament. On the July 11 episode of Impact Wrestling, Anderson was voted to become Vice President of Aces & Eights.

In August, he started a feud with Bully Ray, as Anderson frequently disagreed with Ray's decisions. Anderson's participation in the Bound for Glory series ended on the September 5 episode of Impact Wrestling, when he was eliminated from a twenty-point battle royal by Samoa Joe. Later that night, Anderson turned face once again by costing Bully Ray his no-disqualification match with Sting and announcing himself as his TNA World Heavyweight Championship opponent at No Surrender. The following week, Anderson unsuccessfully challenged Ray for the TNA World Heavyweight Championship in a Last Man Standing match. Afterwards, as Anderson was being stretchered away, Ray attacked him and executed a piledriver to him onto the stage. On September 23, Anderson's profile was quietly removed from TNA's website, seemingly indicating his departure from the company. However, he would make his return on October 24, continuing his storyline with Ray. At Impact Wrestling: Turning Point, he defeated Ray and forced Aces & Eights to disband.

==== Final feuds (2014–2016) ====
On February 20, 2014, Anderson started a feud with Samuel Shaw when he attacked him and Christy Hemme during an interview. At that time, Shaw played a character of a man with an obsession with Hemme. At Lockdown on March 9, Shaw defeated Anderson in a steel cage match by escaping the cage by using Hemme as a distraction by pulling her through the camera cut-out of the steel cage. Anderson rescued Hemme but was caught in Shaw's kata gatame submission hold. The referee, who had been knocked out earlier in the match, only saw Shaw escape the cage and declared him the winner. They faced each other two more times at Impact Wrestling, but their final match happened at Sacrifice on April 27, where Anderson defeated Shaw in a "Committed match", a match where you have to put the rival into a van, in order to win. Anderson won the match and, in storyline, Shaw was sent to a psychiatric facility for intervention. On May 1, Anderson attacked James Storm after the latter lost to Willow. On May 22, Anderson challenged Storm to a drinking contest, then went on to attack him outside the bar. Anderson won a match between the two at Slammiversary XII on June 15.

Following Slammiversary, Anderson formed a tag team with Gunner despite his relationship with Samuel Shaw, whom Gunner had been helping through the kayfabe psychiatric counseling. Anderson and Gunner continued to team together with Shaw at their side. Shaw would frequently try to help them in their matches, but Anderson refused, citing his lack of trust. On August 14, Anderson and Shaw brawled during a match between the former and Gunner. At Hardcore Justice, Anderson was defeated by Shaw in an I Quit match. Anderson returned to TNA on the February 20, 2015, episode of Impact Wrestling, confronting Ethan Carter III and Tyrus for what they were doing to Rockstar Spud and Mandrews by attacking Tyrus and giving him a haircut. On May 8, Anderson was defeated by Carter in a Falls Count Anywhere match. The following week, Anderson defeated Tyrus. At Slammiversary, Anderson and Lashley lost to Carter and Tyrus. Several months later, Anderson engaged in a short feud against Bram, defeating him at both No Surrender and Turning Point. At Bound for Glory, Anderson was eliminated in the Bound for Gold by Tyrus. Throughout October and November, Anderson participated in the TNA World Title Series for the vacant TNA World Heavyweight Championship. However, he ended last in Group Champions. Anderson's final match in TNA was a dark match on January 7, 2016, where he defeated TNA King of the Mountain Champion Eric Young by disqualification in a title match, and his final appearance would be at Rivals 2016 against Bram. In March, it was reported that Anderson was fired from TNA for failing an on-the-spot drug test at an Impact Wrestling taping.

=== Return to the independent circuit (2016–present) ===
In his first independent appearance since his firing from TNA, Anderson competed in Preston City Wrestling's Road to Glory tournament, defeating Luther Ward in the first round and losing to Drew Galloway the next day in the quarter-finals. On March 6, Anderson made his first appearance for Insane Championship Wrestling, losing to Joe Hendry on Friday Night Fight Club. On December 3, at House of Hardcore XXI: Blizzard Brawl, Anderson defeated The Sadist. On April 29, 2017, at Ring of Honor Masters of the Craft, Anderson made a one-time appearance for the company, unsuccessfully challenging for Marty Scurll's ROH World Television Championship.

=== National Wrestling Alliance (2019) ===
Anderson debuted for the National Wrestling Alliance (NWA) at their television tapings on September 30 for NWA Power, defeating enhancement talent in a tag team match alongside Colt Cabana. At the December 16 tapings, Anderson won an eight-man gauntlet match to replace the injured Zane Dawson in the NWA World Television Championship tournament. Anderson, however, was not medically cleared to compete in the tournament, therefore losing his match against Tim Storm by forfeit.

=== Return to TNA (2025) ===
Anderson officially returned to TNA on the September 18 episode of Impact!. He aligned himself with Steve Maclin in his feud with Frankie Kazarian for the International Championship.

=== Return to WWE (2026–present) ===
On November 13, 2026, Anderson announced that he had signed a legends deal with WWE.

== Announcing career ==
In 2017, Anderson signed with Top Rank Boxing as a ring announcer, possibly citing his announcer-like voice during his wrestling tenures.

== Other media ==
Anderson appeared in a feature film Fighting the Still Life, directed by Matt Burns, who wrestled under the name Sick Nick Mondo. He also starred in the action film Behind Enemy Lines: Colombia (2009), a sequel to Behind Enemy Lines (2001). Anderson booked the role through WWE. On July 24, 2007, Anderson appeared on Tom Green Live! in character.

Anderson, along with Mickie James and Josh Mathews, represented WWE at the 2008 Republican National Convention in an effort to persuade fans to register to vote in the 2008 United States presidential election. During the Pittsburgh Penguins' 2009 Stanley Cup championship run, when National Hockey League winger Tyler Kennedy scored a goal, the Mellon Arena public address announcer would announce his family name twice, and the local crowd would chant it similar to Mr. Kennedy. Anderson twice appeared on Family Feud: once in 2007 on a WWE-themed episode and again in 2010 on a TNA-themed episode. In June 2014, Anderson and comedian David Vox Mullen started the Push the Button podcast to cover topics such as religion, sex, and politics.

Anderson has appeared in a number of video games as a playable character, including WWE SmackDown vs. Raw 2007, WWE SmackDown vs. Raw 2008, WWE SmackDown vs. Raw 2009 and WWE SmackDown vs. Raw 2010.

=== Filmography ===
- Behind Enemy Lines: Colombia (2009) – as Master Chief Petty Officer Carter Holt
- Dogs Lie (2011) – as Yuri
- Rimmington Steel (2026) - as Participant

== Personal life ==
Anderson married girlfriend Shawn Trebnick on January 9, 2008. Their twins, Prescott Liberty and Pearce Remington were born in January 2014. Trebnick and Anderson have since divorced. Anderson married his current wife, Anastasia, on January 29, 2018. Anderson has a red and black tattoo on his upper back, which took nearly eight hours to complete. In 2016, Anderson and fellow WWE alum Shawn Daivari founded The Academy professional wrestling school.

In an interview on August 18, 2007, Anderson admitted to using steroids when he was performing on the independent wrestling scene, stating that he had quit using them in November 2005 to comply with WWE's Talent Wellness Program, implying that his job in the promotion was worth more than extra muscle mass. However, 12 days later on August 30, Anderson and nine other WWE wrestlers were named in a Sports Illustrated article as having received performance-enhancing drugs, in violation of the WWE Talent Wellness Program. Anderson received anastrozole, somatropin, and testosterone between October 2006 and February 2007. He later claimed that the steroids were for his latissimus dorsi muscle, which was injured in 2005.

Anderson was fined US$10,000 by WWE for violation of the Wellness Program.

== Championships and accomplishments ==
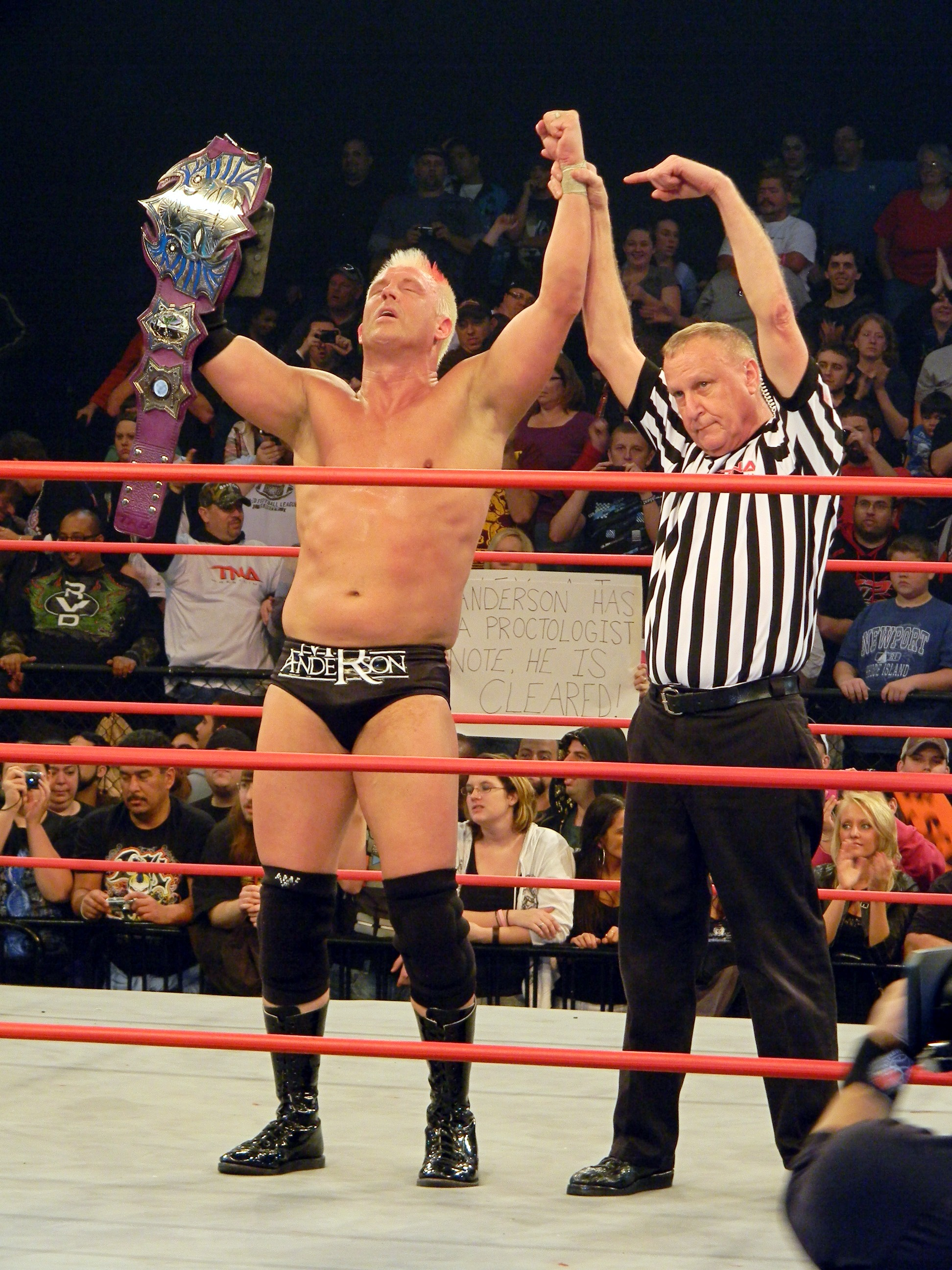
Anderson is a two-time TNA World Heavyweight Champion.

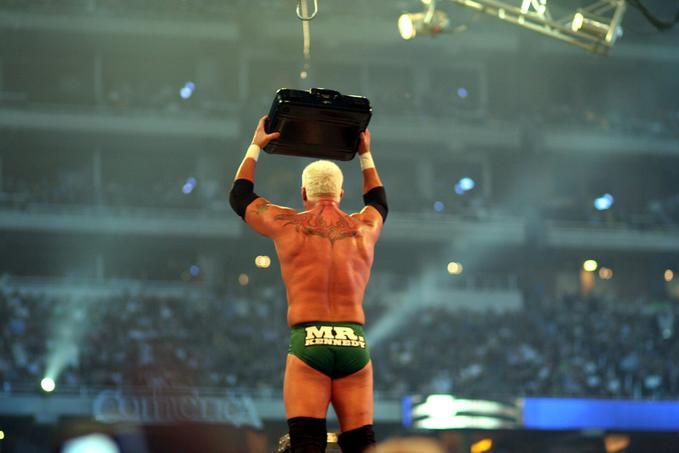
As Mr. Kennedy in WWE, he was the 2007 Money in the Bank winner at WrestleMania 23.

- All-Star Championship Wrestling/ACW Wisconsin
  - ACW Heavyweight Championship (4 times)
  - ACW Television Championship (1 time)
  - ACW Tag Team Championship (3 times) – with Mike Mercury (1), Eric Hammers (1), and Adrian Serrano (1)
  - ACW Hall of Fame (Class of 2009)
- Maine Premier Wrestling
  - MPW Heavyweight Championship (1 time)
- Big League Wrestling
  - BLW World Heavyweight Championship (1 time)
  - BLW Tag Team Championship (1 time)
- Championship Of Wrestling
  - cOw/WPWI United Championship (1 time)
- Fortitude Wrestling Entertainment
  - FWE Heavyweight Championship (1 time)
- Great Lakes Championship Wrestling
  - GLCW Heavyweight Championship (1 time)
- Heavy on Wrestling
  - HoW Undisputed Championship (1 time)
- Juggalo Championship Wrestling
  - JCW World Heavyweight Championship (1 time)
- Mid American Wrestling
  - MAW Heavyweight Championship (1 time)
- NWA Midwest
  - NWA Midwest Heavyweight Championship (1 time)
- Nu-Wrestling Evolution/New Wrestling Entertainment
  - NWE World Heavyweight Championship (1 time)
- Pro Wrestling Illustrated
  - Ranked No. 7 of the top 500 singles wrestlers of the year in the PWI 500 in 2011
- Pro Wrestling Pride
  - PWP Heavyweight Championship (1 time)
- River City Championship Wrestling
  - RCCW Heavyweight Championship (1 time)
- RUGGED Pro Wrestling
  - Rugged Pro Heritage Championship (1 time, current)
- Total Nonstop Action Wrestling
  - TNA World Heavyweight Championship (2 times)
- Ultimate Pro Championship Wrestling
  - UPCW Tag Team Championship (1 time) – with Big Daddy Loker
- UPW Pro Wrestling
  - UPW Heavyweight Championship (1 time)
- World Association of Wrestling
  - WAW World Heavyweight Championship (1 time)
- World Wrestling Entertainment
  - WWE United States Championship (1 time)
  - Money in the Bank (2007)
- Wrestling Observer Newsletter
  - Best Gimmick (2005)
  - Worst Gimmick (2013) as a member of Aces & Eights
- Xtreme Intense Championship Wrestling
  - XICW Tag Team Championship (1 time) – with Joey Padgett

Preceded by Rob Van Dam	Mr. Money in the Bank; April 2007	Succeeded by Edge
