= Behind the Lines (book) =

2005 compilation book by Andrew Carroll

- Author: Andrew Carroll
- Genre: War, History
- Publisher: Scribner
- Publication date: 2005
- ISBN: 0-7432-5616-6
- OCLC: 58648073
- Dewey Decimal: 355/.0092/273 22
- LC Class: E745 .B447 2005

Behind the Lines: Powerful and Revealing American and Foreign War Letters—and One Man's Search to Find Them, published in 2005 by Scribner is a book compiled by Andrew Carroll, the editor of three New York Times bestsellers, consisting of letters written by soldiers during the wars in American history, correspondences by their civilian families, and Carroll's search to find them. (and commentary on the letters) The book differs from the majority of other books regarding American wars as the letters, dating from the American Revolutionary War to the present War in Iraq, Include letters by foreign soldiers, instead of only Americans, reducing the amount of American bias. Also instead of merely focusing on the wars, Carroll also includes some letters which can be considered humorous (such as one where a soldier -who hated writing letters- just wrote a couple lines at the top and bottom of the page and added "P.S. they may censor this" so his parents would think the military had erased most of the letter), that tell the reader about the men who fought, and sometimes died, instead of just the wars that they fought in.

An audio version was released by Simon & Schuster Audio.

== Additional information ==
For more information on this book visit
