= Háj, Košice-okolie District =

Háj Áj
- Municipality
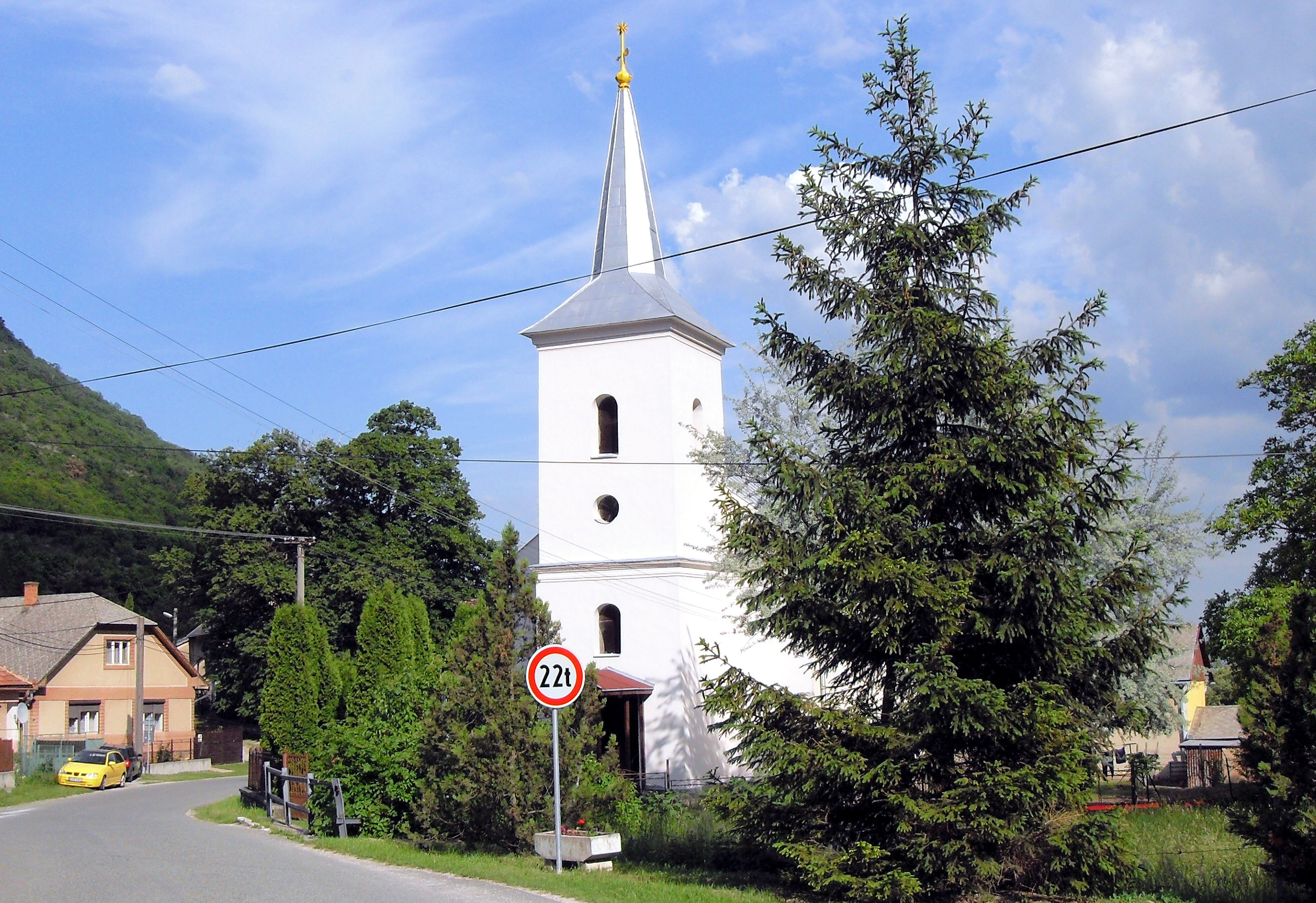
- Reformed church in Háj

- Flag

- Location of Háj in the Košice Region Location of Háj in Slovakia
- Coordinates: 48.63°N 20.85°E
- Country: Slovakia
- Region: Košice Region
- District: Košice-okolie District
- First mentioned: 1409

Government
  - Mayor: Július Farkas

Area
  - Total: 21.35 km^{2} (8.24 sq mi)
- Elevation: 270 m (890 ft)

Population (2025)
  - Total: 240
- Time zone: UTC+1 (CET)
  - Summer (DST): UTC+2 (CEST)
- Postal code: 440 2
- Area code: +421 55
- Vehicle registration plate (until 2022): KS
- Website: haj-aj.sk

Háj (Hungarian: Áj) is a village and municipality in Košice-okolie District in the Kosice Region of eastern Slovakia.

== History ==
The first mention about Háj is from 1357 and 1409. In last decades of 18th century was property of family Keglevich. In the year 1715, there were 14 lieges families.

== Geography ==
The municipality lies at an altitude of 270 metres (890 ft) and covers an area of 21.35 km^{2} (8.24 sq mi) (2025).

== Population ==
Population statistic (10 years)
Year	1995	2005	2015	2025
Count	339	274	288	240
Difference		−19.17%	+5.10%	−16.66%

Population statistic
Year	2024	2025
Count	239	240
Difference		+0.41%

It has a population of 240 people (31 December 2025).

=== Ethnicity ===
Census 2021 (1+ %)
Ethnicity	Number	Fraction
Hungarian	182	73.38%
Slovak	67	27.01%
Not found out	13	5.24%
Total	248	

In year 2021 was 248 people by ethnicity 182 as Hungarian, 67 as Slovak, 13 as Not found out, 2 as Czech and 1 as Moravian.

Note on population: The difference values of population numbers in the table "Population statistic" and in the sections "Ethnicity" & "Religion" is caused by the use of various statistical methods.

=== Religion ===
Census 2021 (1+ %)
Religion	Number	Fraction
Roman Catholic Church	159	64.11%
Calvinist Church	40	16.13%
None	30	12.1%
Not found out	11	4.44%
Greek Catholic Church	4	1.61%
Evangelical Church	3	1.21%
Total	248	

In year 2021 was 248 people by religion 159 from Roman Catholic Church, 40 from Calvinist Church, 30 from None, 11 from Not found out, 4 from Greek Catholic Church, 3 from Evangelical Church and 1 from Other and not ascertained christian church.

== Monuments ==
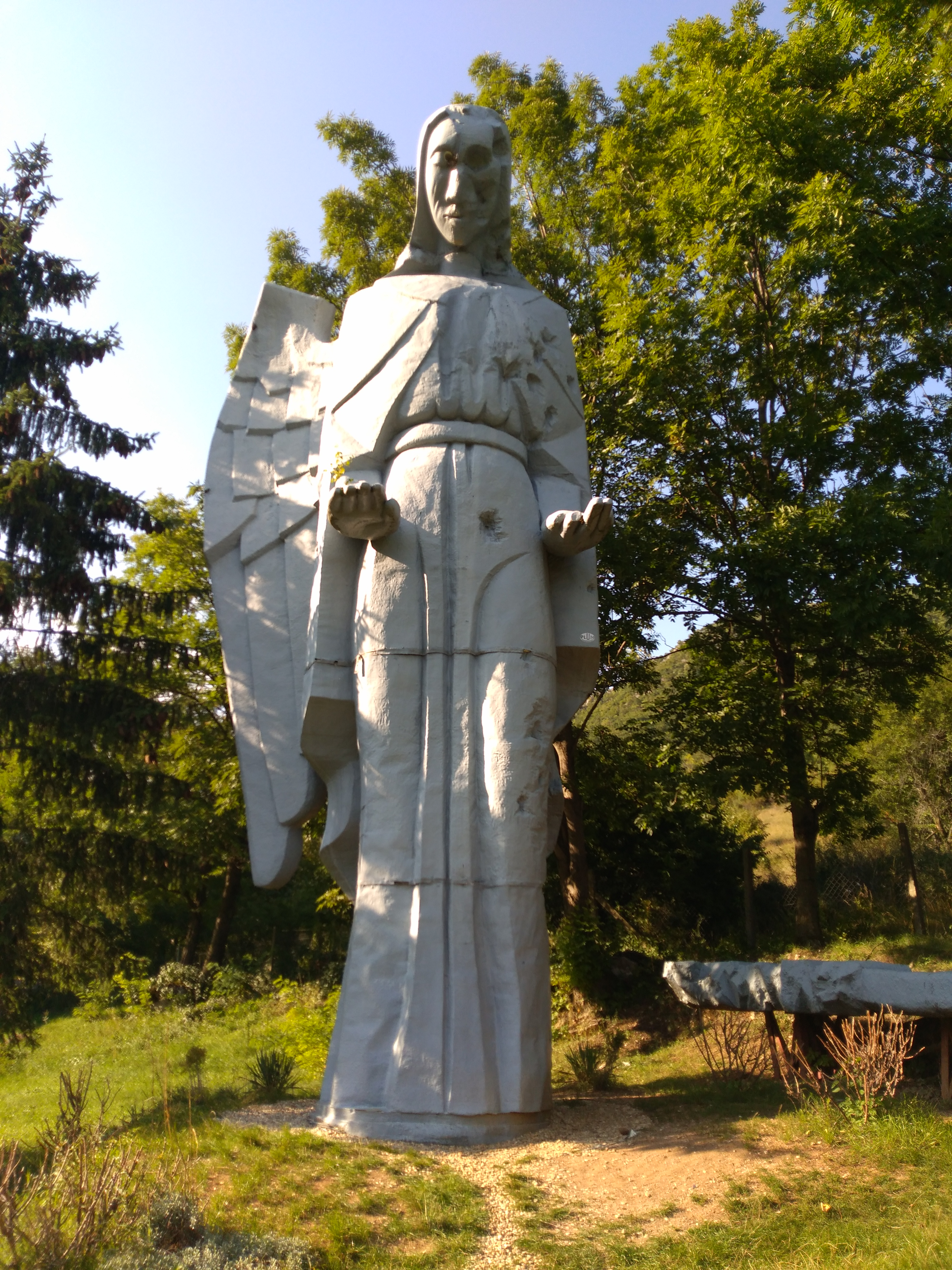
Guardian Angel in Háj

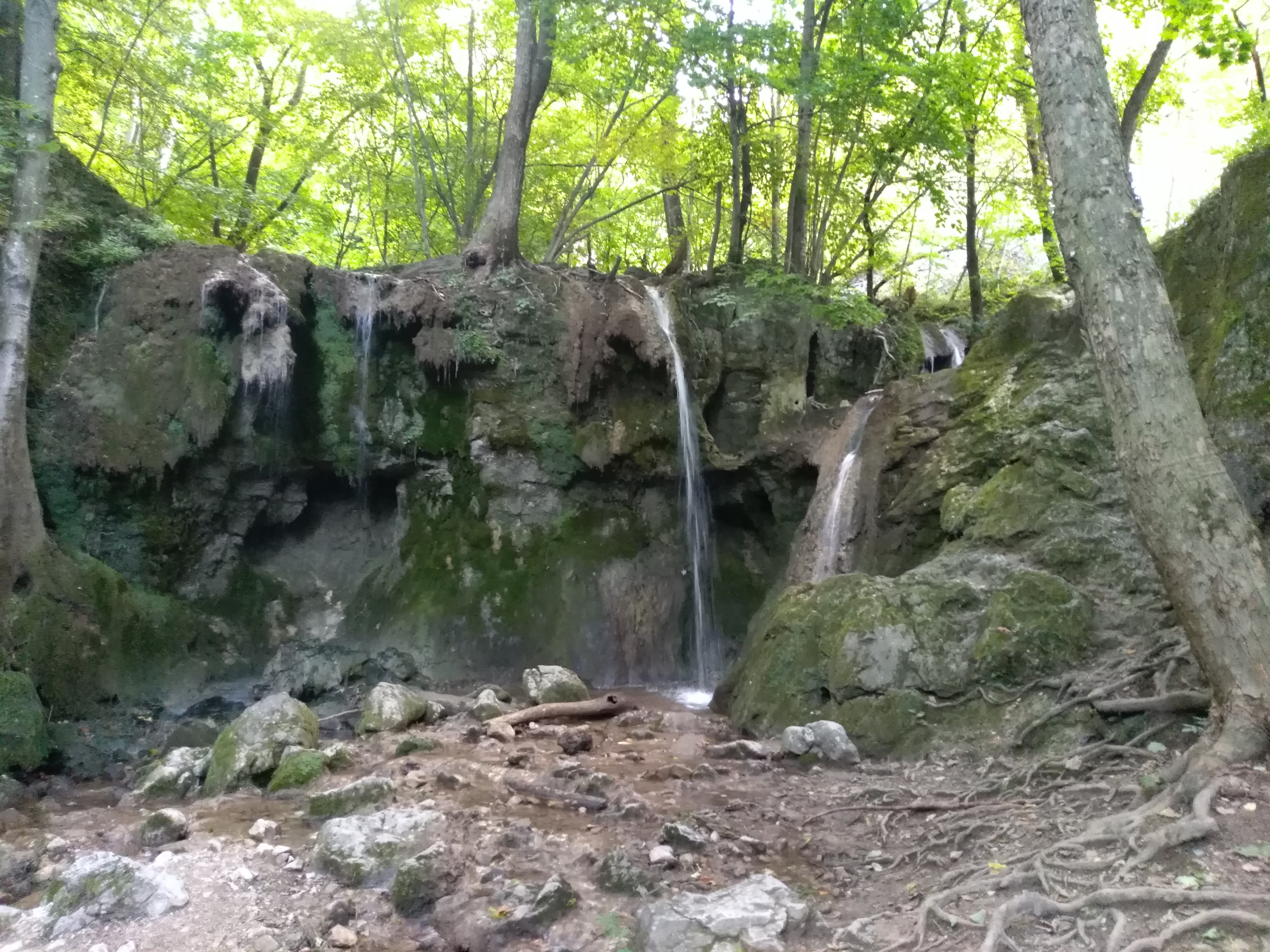
Háj Waterfalls

- Guardian Angel - Angel from movie: Behind Enemy Lines
- Háj's waterfalls
- Major's house with boardinghouse
- Roman & Evangelich church

== Genealogical resources ==
The records for genealogical research are available at the state archive "Statny Archiv in Kosice, Slovakia"

- Roman Catholic church records (births/marriages/deaths): 1711-1899 (parish B)
- Reformated church records (births/marriages/deaths): 1788-1902 (parish B)

== See also ==
- List of municipalities and towns in Slovakia
