= Behind Enemy Lines (2001 film) =

2001 film by John Moore

- Theatrical release poster
- Directed by: John Moore
- Screenplay by: David Veloz; Zak Penn
- Story by: Jim Thomas; John Thomas
- Produced by: John Davis
- Starring: Owen Wilson; Gene Hackman; Joaquim de Almeida; David Keith; Olek Krupa
- Cinematography: Brendan Galvin
- Edited by: Paul Martin Smith
- Music by: Don Davis
- Production company: Davis Entertainment
- Distributed by: 20th Century Fox
- Release date: November 30, 2001
- Running time: 106 minutes
- Country: United States
- Languages: English; Serbian
- Budget: $40 million
- Box office: $121.7 million

Behind Enemy Lines is a 2001 American action war film directed by John Moore in his directorial debut and starring Owen Wilson and Gene Hackman. The film tells the story of Lieutenant Chris Burnett, an American naval flight officer, who is shot down over Bosnia and uncovers genocide during the Bosnian War. Meanwhile, the rear admiral commanding the carrier strike group to which he is assigned is struggling to gain approval to launch a combat search and rescue mission to save Burnett. The plot is loosely based on a 1995 incident involving Scott O'Grady that occurred during the war.

Released on November 30, 2001 by 20th Century Fox, Behind Enemy Lines received generally mixed reviews from critics. It was a box-office success, taking in $121.7 million worldwide against a $40 million budget. The film launched a franchise that includes three sequels, all of them direct-to-video.

== Plot ==
During the final stages of the Bosnian War in 1995, U.S. Navy flight officer Lieutenant Chris Burnett and pilot Lieutenant Jeremy Stackhouse are stationed on the aircraft carrier USS Carl Vinson in the Adriatic Sea. Fed up with the battle readiness routine, Burnett is preparing to leave the Navy and clashes with his commanding officer, Rear Admiral Leslie Reigart. On Christmas, Reigart assigns Burnett and Stackhouse to fly an aerial reconnaissance mission. During the mission, they spot unusual activity in the demilitarized zone. Burnett persuades Stackhouse to fly their F/A-18F Super Hornet off-course for a closer look, unaware that they are photographing Serb Volunteer Guard soldiers burying Bosniak civilians in mass graves. The local Bosnian Serb paramilitary commander, General Miroslav Lokar, is conducting a secret genocide against the Bosniak population and orders the jet to be shot down.

Attempting to outmaneuver Lokar's surface-to-air missiles, Burnett and Stackhouse's jet is hit, forcing them to eject. Lokar and his men find Stackhouse, who is executed by Sasha Ivanic, Lokar's personal assassin. Watching nearby, Burnett gives away his position and flees into the wilderness, and Lokar orders his deputy, Colonel Bazda, and Sasha to hunt him down. Burnett radios for help and receives an extraction point from Reigart, who is forced to stand down after Admiral Piquet, the NATO naval forces commander of the region, warns him that rescuing Burnett in the demilitarized zone risks derailing the peace process. Burnett reaches the extraction point, only to be informed that he must continue to another location, miles outside the demilitarized zone, to be rescued.

Spotting Bazda's patrol, Burnett falls into a mass grave and hides under the corpses until the Serbs move on. To ensure Burnett's rescue, Reigart leaks news of the downed jet to Sky News, angering Piquet. Lokar realizes that the jet's optical disc with the incriminating photographs may still be in the wreckage. Heading to the new extraction point, Burnett escapes Serb soldiers through a minefield. Pursued by Sasha, he encounters Bosniak guerrillas, who offer him a ride to the town of Hač, which Lokar's forces are battling to control. Amid the battle, Burnett's radio is destroyed, and Serb troops believe they have found his corpse, but Sasha recognizes that he switched uniforms with a dead Serb soldier and escaped. To buy more time to catch Burnett, Lokar presents the corpse wearing Burnett's uniform to the media with his head covered, convincing NATO forces that Burnett has been killed, and the mission to rescue him is aborted just as he reaches the extraction point.

Realizing why the Serbs shot him down, Burnett sees an angel statue near where his ejection seat landed, and returns to find it. He reactivates the seat's rescue beacon, notifying his carrier group that he is still alive and alerting the Serbs to his location. Knowing he risks being relieved of command, Reigart prepares a Marine Force Reconnaissance task force to rescue Burnett, in defiance of Piquet's orders. Lokar sends Bazda and Sasha to kill Burnett and recover his body. On their way, Bazda steps on a landmine, and Sasha abandons him to his fate. The resulting explosion alerts Burnett. Sasha finds the ejection seat, but is ambushed by Burnett, who, despite taking a shot in the arm, fatally stabs him with the spike of a railroad flare. Lokar arrives with armored vehicles and infantry, but is held off by Reigart's task force. Retrieving the optical disc, Burnett is rescued, much to Lokar's dismay, as his crime is now being exposed.

The photographs of the mass grave lead to Lokar's arrest and conviction for war crimes, including genocide. Reigart's actions result in his being relieved of command and his retirement from service, while Burnett continues his career in the Navy.

== Cast ==
- Owen Wilson as Naval Flight Officer Lieutenant Chris "Longhorn" Burnett, the navigator who finds himself surrounded in a warzone
- Gene Hackman as Rear Admiral Leslie McMahon Reigart, commander of the Adriatic Battle Unit
- Gabriel Macht as Naval Aviator Lieutenant Jeremy "Smoke" Stackhouse, Burnett's pilot
- Joaquim de Almeida as Admiral Juan Miguel Piquet, commander of the NATO naval forces
- David Keith as Master Chief Tom O'Malley, Reigart's advisor
- Olek Krupa as Serb General Miroslav Lokar, a ruthless general who was behind a genocidal attack on the Bosniaks
- Vladimir Mashkov as Sasha Ivanic, Lokar's personal enforcer and sniper
- Charles Malik Whitfield as Captain Glen Rodway, a Force Recon company commander aboard the Carl Vinson
- Geoff Pierson as Admiral Donnelly
- Leon Russom as Ed Burnett, Chris's father
- Marko Igonda as Colonel Viktor Bazda, Lokar's second-in-command
- Eyal Podell as Petty Officer Kennedy
- Laurence Mason as Captain Glen Brandon, a Marine officer in the Marine Force Recon Unit
- Vladimir Oktasec as Petrovic, the Serbian president
- Salaetin Bilal as Ejup, Leader of the Bosniak guerrillas in Hač
- Kamil Kollárik as Babić, a Bosniak guerrilla who helps Chris reach Hač
- Aernout van Lynden as himself

== Production ==
In December 1996, 20th Century Fox announced it had greenlit Behind Enemy Lines from Davis Entertainment based on Scott O'Grady and the Banja Luka incident, with David Nutter set to direct. In December 1999, it was announced commercial director John Moore had been hired to direct the film as his feature debut with James Van Der Beek attached to star. By July 2000, it was announced Van Der Beek had been replaced by Owen Wilson.

The film was shot at the Koliba Studios in Bratislava, Slovakia, and on location in the Slovakian village of Háj (the village of Háj also has a prop of an angel from the film).

In exchange for U.S. military assistance in production, the script of the film was changed at the military's request. USS Carl Vinson was the aircraft carrier featured in the film. Exterior naval footage was filmed onboard the carrier. Interiors were filmed on USS Constellation and on a film set. The release date was originally January 18, 2002, but this was moved up to November 30, 2001.

== Historical inspiration ==
The film bears some resemblance to the experiences of former U.S. Air Force Captain Scott O'Grady, who was shot down over Bosnia on June 2, 1995. He survived for six days before being rescued by U.S. Marines. O'Grady, who later became a children's author and motivational speaker, filed suit against both the producers of Behind Enemy Lines, as well as Behind Enemy Lines: The Scott O'Grady Story, a 1998 documentary that Discovery Channel aired on his experience, for defamation of character, accusing the film's producers of invasion of privacy through the misappropriation of his name, likeness, and identity, false representation, and false advertising, and contending that those involved in both works produced them without his permission, and that the commercial value of his name was damaged by them. O'Grady's complaint indicated that among other things, he was troubled by the disobedience and profanity exhibited by the feature film's main character. O'Grady also accused Fox of using the documentary to promote the feature film and making a film about his ordeal without his permission. The film's characters and events differ from O'Grady's experience; he never entered populated areas, nor did he interact with civilians, and he did not engage in direct combat with enemy soldiers. Also, O'Grady never flew an F/A-18F, but rather an F-16 Fighting Falcon. The case was settled out of court.

== Reception ==
=== Box office ===
The film made $18.7 million in its opening week in the U.S., landing at the number-two spot and was held off the top spot by Harry Potter and the Sorcerer's Stone. Behind Enemy Lines eventually grossed $121 million worldwide, of which $79 million were from North America. The budget was estimated to be $40 million.

=== Critical response ===
Behind Enemy Lines received generally mixed reviews from critics. Review aggregator website Rotten Tomatoes gives the film a score of 36% based on reviews from 132 critics, with a weighted average of 4.8/10 and the site's consensus stating "The plot for Behind Enemy Lines is more jingoistic than credible, and the overload of flashy visual tricks makes the action sequences resemble a video game." Metacritic has assigned the film an average score of 49 out of 100 based on 29 reviews from mainstream critics, indicating "mixed or average" reviews. Audiences surveyed by CinemaScore gave the film a grade "B+" on scale of A to F.

Roger Ebert gave the film 1½ stars out of four, likening it to a comedy: "Its hero is so reckless and its villains so incompetent that it's a showdown between a man begging to be shot, and an enemy that can't hit the side of a Bosnian barn." Lisa Schwarzbaum in Entertainment Weekly described the film as a "steel-toed, tin-eared, flat-footed, jingoistic" military thriller.

== Sequels ==
Behind Enemy Lines was followed by three direct-to-video spiritual successors. Behind Enemy Lines II: Axis of Evil was released in 2006, Behind Enemy Lines: Colombia was released in 2009 (this film was co-produced by WWE Studios), and SEAL Team 8: Behind Enemy Lines was released in 2014.

== Television pilot ==
The Fox network ordered a pilot episode of a series loosely based on the film in February 2017 for consideration as part of the network's 2017–18 television season. Fox chose not to order further episodes after the pilot.
