= Mirjami Heikkinen =

Finnish voice actress

- Born: 1984 (age 41–42); Finland
- Occupation: Voice actress
- Years active: 1999–present

Mirjami Heikkinen (born 1984) is a Finnish voice actress, who has been voice-dubbing roles in the Finnish language for many foreign media, since 1999. She is good friends with Finnish voice actor Samuel Harjanne, since they have done voice roles together in many of the same dubbing productions that they were both involved in. She also has a younger sister, Heljä, who is also a voice actress. Her best known voice-over roles include Blossom in The Powerpuff Girls and Kim Possible of the same character of the same title of the cartoon. In film, she was the Finnish dubbing voice of Hermione Granger from the Harry Potter films and video games.

== Filmography ==
=== Cartoons ===
List of voice performances in cartoons
Title	Role	Notes	Source
101 Dalmatians: The Series	Additional voices		
Avatar: The Last Airbender	Katara	Dubbing Mae Whitman	
Bratz	Cloe		
Handy Manny	Squeeze		
Kim Possible	Kim Possible		
Pepper Ann	Tessa James, Gwen Mezzrow		
The Powerpuff Girls	Blossom		
The Replacements	Additional voices		
Super Robot Monkey Team Hyperforce Go!	Jinmay		
W.I.T.C.H.	Cornelia Hale		

=== Anime ===
List of voice performances in anime
Title	Role	Notes	Source
Digimon Adventure	Palmon, Lilimon		
Digimon Adventure 02	Kyo, Palmon		
Digimon Tamers	Rika, Calumon		
Pokémon	Dawn		
Yu-Gi-Oh! GX	Alexis Rhodes		

=== Animated films ===
List of voice performances in direct-to-video and television films
Title	Role	Notes	Source
Comet in Moominland	The Mymble		
The Powerpuff Girls Movie	Blossom		

=== Video games ===
List of voice performances in video games
Title	Role	Notes	Source
Harry Potter and the Goblet of Fire	Hermione Granger		
The Legend of Spyro: Dawn of the Dragon	Cynder		
The Legend of Spyro: The Eternal Night	Cynder		
The Legend of Spyro: A New Beginning	Cynder		
