= Kevin Michael Richardson filmography =

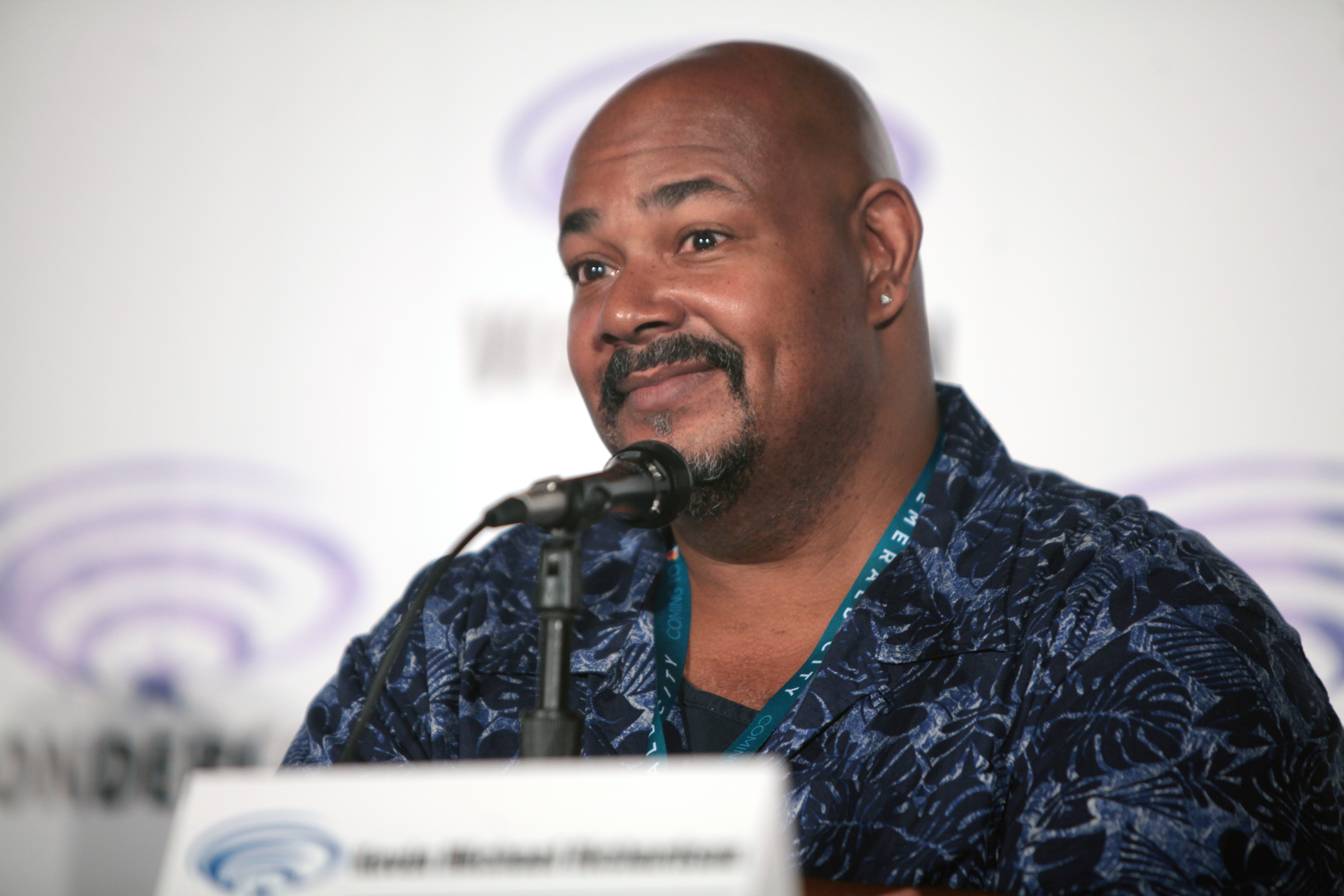
Richardson at WonderCon in 2016

Kevin Michael Richardson is an American actor. He is known for his distinctively deep voice. He has mostly voiced villainous characters in animation and video games. In film, Richardson voiced Goro in Mortal Kombat (1995) and reprises in Mortal Kombat Legends: Scorpion's Revenge (2020), Captain Gantu in the Lilo & Stitch franchise, Kamek in The Super Mario Bros. Movie, Bulkhead from Transformers: Prime, and Deus Ex Machina in The Matrix Revolutions (2003). He has also voiced characters on Seth MacFarlane's shows Family Guy, The Cleveland Show, and American Dad!, as well as several characters on The Simpsons, and Futurama.

Richardson is also known for his roles as Trigon, Mammoth and See-More in both Teen Titans and Teen Titans Go!, Antauri in Super Robot Monkey Team Hyperforce Go!, Oroku Saki/the Shredder in the 2012 Teenage Mutant Ninja Turtles series, Stump Smash and Tree Rex in the Skylanders video game series, Rosie in F Is for Family, Barney Rubble in The Flintstones: On the Rocks, the Mauler Twins and Monster Girl in Invincible, and Chairman Drek in the video game Ratchet & Clank. He received two Daytime Emmy Award nominations for voicing the Joker in The Batman (2004–2008). He was nominated for Voice Actor of the Year by Behind the Voice Actors in 2012 and in 2013.

== Film ==
Year	Title	Role	Notes	Source
1993	Fatal Instinct	Bailiff		
1994	Past Tense	Arresting Cop		
1994	A Boy Called Hate	Staff Member		
1995	Stuart Saves His Family		Uncredited	
1995	Mortal Kombat	Goro		
1996	Spy Hard	Security Guard	Uncredited	
1996	Bound	Cop #2		
1998	BASEketball	Peripatetic Player		
2000	The 2000 Essence Awards	Announcer		
2001	Summoning	Bill	Short film	
2003	The Matrix Revolutions	Deus Ex Machina	Voice	
2004	Comic Book: The Movie	Ice Tray		
2006	Clerks II	Cop		
2009	La Mission	Dee		
2009	Transformers: Revenge of the Fallen	Ancient Prime, Skipjack		
2013	I Know That Voice	Himself	Documentary	
2017	Transformers: The Last Knight	Berserker, Knight of Iacon	Uncredited	
2018	Benji	Mongrel	Voice	

== Television ==
Year	Title	Role	Notes	Source
1992	Something to Live for: The Alison Gertz Story	Intern #2	Television film	
1992	Herman's Head	Male Nurse	Episode: "Sperm 'n' Herman"	
1993	Dream On	Craig	Episode: "The French Conception"	
1994	Mad About You	Cable Man	Episode: "Pandora's Box"	
1994	ER	Patrick	3 episodes	
1995	The Boys Are Back	Cameraman	Episode: "Bad Hair Day"	
1995	Simon	Ray	S01E12	
1995–1996	Weird Science	Lieutenant, Husky-Voiced Pirate	2 episodes	
1996	The John Larroquette Show	Curtis	Episode: "John's Lucky Day"	
1996–1997	Homeboys in Outer Space	Vashti	21 episodes	
1997–1998	Teen Angel	Coach Fortner	2 episodes	
1998	DiResta	Higgins	Episode: "Cookin' with Gas"	
1998	Working	Bartender	Episode: "Greenery"	
1999	Odd Man Out	M.L.	Episode: "What About Bob?"	
2002	Greg the Bunny	SK-2.0 Announcer	Episode: "SK-2.0"	
2003–2004	Like Family	Ed Ward	23 episodes	
2004	Bobby Cannon	Lincoln	Unaired pilot	
2005	Phil of the Future	Mr. Littletree	Voice, episode: "Phil Without a Future"	
2006	Malcolm in the Middle	Bob Hope	Voice, episode: "Hal Grieves"	
2007	The Knights of Prosperity	Rockefeller Butts	13 episodes	
2008	The Cleaner	Darnell McDowell	13 episodes	
2009	How I Met Your Mother	Stan	Episode: "The Three Days Rule"	
2010	In Security	Ben	Television film	

== Animated films ==
Key
†	Denotes films that have not yet been released

Year	Title	Role	Notes	Source
1996	All Dogs Go to Heaven 2	St. Bernard, Officer Andrews		
2000	Sinbad: Beyond the Veil of Mists	Mustafa		
2000	Whispers: An Elephant's Tale	Adult Whispers		
2000	Rugrats in Paris: The Movie	Sumo Singers	Credited as Kevin Richardson	
2001	Recess: School's Out	Cop #2		
2002	Lilo & Stitch	Captain Gantu		
2002	The Powerpuff Girls Movie	Rocko Socko, Ojo Tango		
2002	The Country Bears	Henry Dixon Taylor		
2002	The Wild Thornberrys Movie	Shaman Mnyambo		
2003	The Matrix Revolutions	Deus Ex Machina		
2004	Adventures in Animation 3D	Coach		
2004	Teacher's Pet	Conductor		
2005	Porco Rosso	Mamma Aiuto Gang		
2005	Pom Poko	Bunta, Wonderland President		
2006	Hoodwinked!	P-Biggie		
2006	The Wild	Samson's Father		
2006	Tales from Earthsea	Ship's Captain, Slave Trader #2		
2007	Happily N'Ever After	Additional voices		
2007	Doraemon: Nobita's New Great Adventure into the Underworld	Professor Mangetsu		
2007	TMNT	General Aguila		
2008	Star Wars: The Clone Wars	Jabba the Hutt		
2009	The Princess and the Frog	Ian the Gator		
2013	Elysium	Christopher		
2013	John Dies at the End	Korrok		
2013	Star Trek Into Darkness	Additional voices		
2014	Planes: Fire & Rescue	Ryker		
2015	Strange Magic	Brutus		
2015	The SpongeBob Movie: Sponge Out of Water	Seagull		
2018	Scooby-Doo! & Batman: The Brave and the Bold	Clayface, Detective Chimp, GNN Reporter		
2020	Trolls World Tour	Mr. Dinkles, Sid Fret, Growly Pete		
2021	Extinct	Sled Dogs		
2022	Minions: The Rise of Gru	Henchman #2		
2023	The Super Mario Bros. Movie	Kamek		
2023	Trolls Band Together	Mr. Dinkles		
2026	The Super Mario Galaxy Movie	Kamek		

== Direct-to-video and television films ==
Year	Title	Role	Notes !	Source
1996	Siegfried & Roy: Masters of the Impossible	Additional voices		
1998–2003	The Wacky Adventures of Ronald McDonald	Grimace, King Gonga		
1998	The Secret of NIMH 2: Timmy to the Rescue	Brutus		
1999	Alvin and the Chipmunks Meet Frankenstein	Bud Wiley, Bodyguard		
2000	Tom Sawyer	Injurin' Joe		
2000	Buzz Lightyear of Star Command: The Adventure Begins	Space Ranger		
2000	Scooby-Doo and the Alien Invaders	Max		
2000	Thrillseekers: Putt n' Perish	Bartender, Otto, Pig		
2001	The Flintstones: On the Rocks	Barney Rubble, Hector, Jewel Guard		
2002	Mickey's House of Villains	Chorus		
2003	Scooby-Doo! and the Legend of the Vampire	Malcolm Illiwara, Yowie Yahoo		
2003	The Animatrix	Thaddeus, Agent #2, Cop		
2003	The Fairly OddParents: Abra-Catastrophe!	Bad Guy, Business Man		
2003	Stitch! The Movie	Captain Gantu		
2003	George of the Jungle 2	Grouchy Ape, Chimp		
2003	Batman: Mystery of the Batwoman	Carlton Duquesne		
2004	The Fairly OddParents: Channel Chasers	Future AJ, Dad's Boss, Snoop, additional voices		
2004	Mulan II	Additional voices		
2005	Lil' Pimp	Smokey		
2005	Kim Possible Movie: So the Drama	Sumo Ninja, Dr. Gooberman		
2005	The Proud Family Movie	Sea Beast, The Mangler, Narrator		
2005	Family Guy Presents: Stewie Griffin: The Untold Story	Young Ray Charles, additional voices		
2005	The Batman vs. Dracula	The Joker		
2005	The Happy Elf	Mayor, Derek, Toady, Tucker, Man #2		
2006	The Jimmy Timmy Power Hour 2: When Nerds Collide	Morgan Freeman, Anti-Fairy Walla		
2006	Leroy & Stitch	Captain Gantu		
2006	Queer Duck: The Movie	Stephen Arlo 'Openly' Gator		
2006	Tom and Jerry: Shiver Me Whiskers	Red Pirate Ron, Blue Pirate Bob, Purple Parrot Chuck		
2006	Casper's Scare School	Kibosh		
2007	Eggheads	Additional voices		
2007	Doctor Strange: The Sorcerer Supreme	Baron Mordo		
2008	Batman: Gotham Knight	Lucius Fox		
2008	The Little Mermaid: Ariel's Beginning	Cheeks, Ray-Ray		
2008	The Goldilocks and the 3 Bears Show	Jay Weasel		
2008	Open Season 2	Additional voices		
2008	Dead Space: Downfall	Samuel Irons, Pendleton, Miner		
2009	The Powerpuff Girls Rule!	Fish Balloon	Television special	
2009	Afro Samurai: Resurrection	Blacksmith, Takimoto	English dub	
2009	Scooby-Doo! and the Samurai Sword	Sojo, The Black Samurai		
2009	The Fairly OddParents: Wishology	Dark Laser, Waiter	Television special	
2009	The Haunted World of El Superbeasto	Santa Baby		
2010	Planet Hulk	Korg		
2010	Dante's Inferno: An Animated Epic	King Minos		
2010	Batman: Under the Red Hood	Tyler		
2010	Superman/Shazam!: The Return of Black Adam	Tawky Tawny		
2010	Firebreather	Belloc		
2011	All-Star Superman	Steve Lombard		
2011	Phineas and Ferb the Movie: Across the 2nd Dimension	Normbots, additional voices		
2011	Scooby-Doo! Legend of the Phantosaur	Tex, Cop #2, Grad Student #3, Bikers		
2011	Night of the Hurricane	Cleveland Brown Jr., Principal Brian Lewis	Television special	
2011	DC Showcase: Catwoman	Moe		
2013	Scooby-Doo! Mask of the Blue Falcon	Ron Starlin		
2013	Justice League: The Flashpoint Paradox	President		
2013	Scooby-Doo! Stage Fright	Security Guard #1, Hotel Clerk		
2013	Transformers Prime Beast Hunters: Predacons Rising	Bulkhead		
2014	JLA Adventures: Trapped in Time	Black Manta, Solomon Grundy		
2014	Stan Lee's Mighty 7	Guard		
2014	The Pirate Fairy	Yang		
2014	Scooby-Doo! Frankencreepy	Cuthbert Crawley		
2014	Lego DC Comics: Batman Be-Leaguered	Captain Cold, Black Manta		
2014	How Murray Saved Christmas	Santa Claus		
2014	Elf: Buddy's Musical Christmas	Fake Santa #2, Jerry Hobbs, Additional Voices		
2015	Madea's Tough Love	Judge Michaels		
2015	Lego DC Comics Super Heroes: Justice League vs. Bizarro League	Captain Cold, Gorilla Grodd		
2015	Scooby-Doo! Moon Monster Madness	Uvinious "U-Boat" Botango, Drake		
2015	The Flintstones & WWE: Stone Age SmackDown!	Barney Rubble		
2015	Lego DC Comics Super Heroes: Justice League: Attack of the Legion of Doom	Captain Cold, Gorilla Grodd, Black Manta		
2016	Lego DC Comics Super Heroes: Justice League – Cosmic Clash	Cave Woman, First Mate		
2017	Tangled: Before Ever After	Otter		
2017	The Jetsons & WWE: Robo-WrestleMania!	Drill Bot		
2017	Batman and Harley Quinn	Jason Woodrue / Floronic Man		
2018	Scooby-Doo! & Batman: The Brave and the Bold	Detective Chimp, Clayface		
2018	Lego DC Comics Super Heroes: The Flash	Doctor Fate, Captain Cold		
2018	Lego DC Super Hero Girls: Super-Villain High	Doctor Fate, Delivery Man		
2019	Justice League vs. the Fatal Five	Mister Terrific, Kilowog		
2019	Teen Titans Go! vs. Teen Titans	Trigon, Hexagon		
2020	Mortal Kombat Legends: Scorpion's Revenge	Goro, Bystander		
2024	Lego Marvel Avengers: Mission Demolition	Groot, Ballinger		

== Animation ==
Year	Series	Role	Notes	Source
1994	Skeleton Warriors	Additional voices		
1995–1997	The Mask: The Animated Series	Mayor Mortimer Tilton		
1995	The Twisted Tales of Felix the Cat	Additional voices		
1995	Earthworm Jim	Anti-Fish	Episode: "The Anti-Fish"	
1996–1997	Pinky and the Brain	Jelly Head, Bernard Shaw	2 episodes	
1996–1997	Road Rovers	Exile		
1996–1997	Superman: The Animated Series	Cop, Al	2 episodes	
1996–1997	The Real Adventures of Jonny Quest	Computer Voice, Sentry, Tech, Segala, Monster	2 episodes	
1996–1999	Adventures from the Book of Virtues	Plato		
1996	What a Cartoon!	Flinch, Thugs	Episode: "Buy One, Get One Free"	
1996	Hey Arnold!	Blind Man, Newscaster	Episode: "Das Subway"	
1996	Mortal Kombat: Defenders of the Realm	Kabal, Black Dragon Thug		
1997–1998	Space Goofs	Additional voices		
1997	Rugrats	Trash Guy, Sergeant, Martin Luther King Jr.		
1997	Dexter's Laboratory	Deep Dee Dee, Action Hank, Cop		
1997	Aaahh!!! Real Monsters	Zooeuh, Clem Lashinsky, Drill Sergeant	2 episodes	
1998	Cow and Chicken	Dick	Episode: "The Karate Chick"	
1998	Animaniacs	Almond Rocha	Episode: "The Christmas Tree"	
1998	I Am Weasel	Fat Tree, Oak, Birch, Tree #3	Episode: "A Tree Story"	
1998	The New Batman Adventures	Mutant Leader	Episode: "Legends of the Dark Knight"	
1998–2000	Voltron: The Third Dimension	Emperor Zarkon, Hunk, Narrator		
1998–2000	Oh Yeah! Cartoons	Various voices		
1998–2005	The Powerpuff Girls	Boogie Man, Giant Fish Balloon, additional voices		
1999	The Sylvester & Tweety Mysteries	Signore Malvoce	Episode: "Venice, Anyone?"	
1999	Batman Beyond	Security Chief, Mr. Chandler, Pilot	3 episodes	
1999–2002	The PJs	Papa Hudson, Jamaican		
1999–2002	The New Woody Woodpecker Show	Polar Bear, Major Bull		
1999–present	Family Guy	Jerome, Cleveland Brown Jr., others		
1999–2004	Johnny Bravo	Additional voices		
1999–2001	The Big Guy and Rusty the Boy Robot	Garth		
2000	Lobo	Lobo, Slaz, Sniff, Fat Whutzat, Mudboy	Web series	
2000	Hard Drinkin' Lincoln	Fred G. Sanford, additional voices	Web series	
2000	Godzilla: The Series	Additional voices	Episode: "Twister"	
2000	The Weekenders	Diz, Bibson		
2000	The Wild Thornberrys	Shaman	Episode: "Gift of Gab"	
2000	Recess	Mr. LaSalle, Streak		
2000	Buzz Lightyear of Star Command	Various voices		
2000–2001	Clerks: The Animated Series	Narrator, Morpheus		
2000–2004	Static Shock	Robert Hawkins, Kangor, Bernie Rast, Onyx, Bouncer		
2001–2004	Lloyd in Space	Captain Frontok	Episode: "The Hero of Urbit-Knarr"	
2001–2004	Justice League	General Wells	5 episodes	
2001	Time Squad	Additional voices		
2001–2005	The Proud Family	Omar Philips, Doctor Payne		
2001–2002	Invader Zim	Additional voices		
2001–2002	Clifford the Big Red Dog	Bruno	2 episodes	
2001–2017	The Fairly OddParents	Dark Laser, A.J.'s Dad, Santa Clause, additional voices		
2002–2003	The Mummy	The Minotaur	3 episodes	
2002, 2018, 2023–2025	SpongeBob SquarePants	King Neptune, Nurse Bazooka, Sir Urchin		
2002–2007	Kim Possible	Slim Possible, additional voices		
2002	House of Mouse	Prince John, Crow		
2002	As Told by Ginger	Jimmy	Episode: "Heat Lightning"	
2002	The Zeta Project	Jason's Father, Curtis	2 episodes	
2002–2004	What's New, Scooby-Doo?	Additional voices		
2002–2004, 2017	Samurai Jack	Demongo, various voices		
2002–2008	Codename: Kids Next Door	Dr. Lincoln, others		
2003–2006	Teen Titans	Mammoth, See-More, Trigon, River Guardian, Cave Guardian		
2003–2006	The Adventures of Jimmy Neutron: Boy Genius	Tee, Tremendous Jackson		
2003–2006	Lilo & Stitch: The Series	Captain Gantu, Cobra Bubbles, Officer Kahiko		
2003–2005	Duck Dodgers	Nasty Canasta, various voices		
2003–2005	The Grim Adventures of Billy & Mandy	Additional voices		
2003–2009	My Life as a Teenage Robot	Armagedroid, Vladimir, additional voices		
2004–2005	Dave the Barbarian	Dave (singing voice), Oswidge, additional voices		
2004–2005	Megas XLR	Glorft Commander, Tiny, Georgie, various voices		
2004–2005	Star Wars: Clone Wars	K'Kruhk, Jedi Master	Episode: "Volume One"	
2004–2005	Xiaolin Showdown	Pandabubba		
2004–2007	Danny Phantom	Skulker, Operative M, Dragon Ghost, Paulina's Dad		
2004–2008	The Batman	Joker, Horace Wigzell		
2004	Higglytown Heroes	Uncle Lemmo		
2004–2006	Super Robot Monkey Team Hyperforce Go!	Antauri, Morlath, various voices		
2005	The Buzz on Maggie	Mrs. Cartflight, additional voices		
2005	American Dragon: Jake Long	Santa Claus	Episode: "Eye Of The Beholder"	
2005–present	American Dad!	Principal Lewis, Tank Bates, additional voices	211 episodes	
2005–2008	Avatar: The Last Airbender	Tyro, Lion Turtle, Big Bad Hippo, additional voices		
2005–2009	Foster's Home for Imaginary Friends	Uncle Pockets, Yeti, additional voices		
2005–2007	Catscratch	Lackey Tom, Bouncer	2 episodes	
2005–2007	Loonatics Unleashed	Slam Tasmanian, Tech E. Coyote, Massive, Announcer, Warden Oates		
2005–2006	Danger Rangers	Burble, various voices		
2005–2014	The Boondocks	Various	14 episodes	
2006–2008	The Emperor's New School	Kavo, others		
2006	Shorty McShorts' Shorts	Admiral Bozzlebags	Episode: "Bozzlebag's Zip"	
2006–2007	Class of 3000	Various voices		
2007–2009	Chowder	Shnitzel, Marching Band Guy, Piston Vendor	3 episodes	
2008	The Land Before Time	Scuttle		
2008	Transformers: Animated	Omega Supreme	Episode: "A Bridge Too Close: Part II"	
2008	The Mighty B!	Donald the Postman, others		
2008–2009	Random! Cartoons	Additional voices		
2008–2009	Back at the Barnyard	Bling, Cow #1, Masked Cow, Santa Claus, Thor		
2008–2009	The Spectacular Spider-Man	Tombstone, Big Man, Principal Davis, Coach Smith		
2008–2009	Ben 10: Alien Force	Highbreed Commander, Sheriff Mason, Emperor Milleous, Forever Knights		
2008–2009	The Marvelous Misadventures of Flapjack	Additional Voices		
2008–2015	The Penguins of Madagascar	Maurice, Bing, Pinky, Male Duck, various voices		
2008–2011	Batman: The Brave and the Bold	Black Manta, B'wana Beast, Starro, Detective Chimp, Lex Luthor, Despero, Steppenwolf, Monsieur Mallah, Mister Mxyzptlk, President		
2009	Random! Cartoons	Krunch, Infinite Goliath, additional voices		
2009	Wolverine and the X-Men	Bishop, Shadow King		
2009	Phineas and Ferb	P. P. Otter		
2009	Fanboy & Chum Chum	Berry		
2009–2013	The Cleveland Show	Cleveland Brown Jr., Lester Krinklesac, others		
2009–present	The Simpsons	Dr. Hibbert (2021–present), Bleeding Gums Murphy, various characters	Replacing Harry Shearer	
2009–2010	The Super Hero Squad Show	Nick Fury, Scorpio		
2010	Black Panther	Wolverine, others		
2010	Zevo-3	Brett Ronson, others		
2010	Sym-Bionic Titan	Additional voices		
2010	Generator Rex	Knuckles, EVO Guard, Tripp	Episode: "Rabble"	
2010	The Avengers: Earth's Mightiest Heroes	Man-Ape, N'Gassi	2 episodes	
2010–2016	Adventure Time	Donny, additional voices		
2010–2013	Star Wars: The Clone Wars	Jabba the Hutt, additional voices		
2010–2013	Pound Puppies	Additional voices		
2010–2013	Transformers: Prime	Bulkhead, Makeshift, others		
2010–2013	Young Justice	Mal Duncan, Martian Manhunter, John Stewart, Nabu, Vykin, Bruno Mannheim, Paul Sloane, Kilowog, Blackbriar Thorn, Thomas Kalmaku, Otis, various voices		Recurring role
2010–2011	G.I. Joe: Renegades	Roadblock, Road Pig, others		
2011	The Problem Solverz	Wendigo	Episode: "Hamburger Cavez"	
2011	The Looney Tunes Show	Guard	Episode: "Devil Dog"	
2011	Fish Hooks	Dave the Cave Fish	Episode: "Peopleing"	
2011–2012	ThunderCats	Panthro, Lynx-O, Anet, Sauro, others		
2011–2013	Kung Fu Panda: Legends of Awesomeness	Temutai, Hong, Jing Mei, Buffalo Soldier, Xinshi		
2011–2013	Green Lantern: The Animated Series	Kilowog, Mogo		
2012–2013	The Legend of Korra	Butakha, Doorman, Lightning Bolt Zolt, Old Salt		
2012–2013	Ultimate Spider-Man	Juggernaut, Awesome Android, Groot, Howard the Duck, Bulldozer, Frankenstein's Monster, Ulik, Mac Porter		
2012–2013	Mad	War Machine, Various Voices		
2012–2016	Gravity Falls	Sheriff Blubs, Leaderaur, Chutzpar, others		
2012–2015	Randy Cunningham: 9th Grade Ninja	Willem Viceroy		
2012–2017	Teenage Mutant Ninja Turtles	Oroku Saki/Shredder, General Unsura, additional voices		
2012–2014	Ben 10: Omniverse	Sir Morton, Blitzwolfer, Emperor Milleous, Snare-oh, Yugene, Plumber		
2013–2014	Monsters vs. Aliens	General Warren R. Monger, various voices		
2013–2014	Hulk and the Agents of S.M.A.S.H.	Ego the Living Planet, Groot, Frankenstein's Monster		
2013–present	Teen Titans Go!	Trigon, Mammoth, See-More		
2013–2018	Avengers Assemble	Ulik, Groot, Heimdall, N'Basa		
2013–2016	Wander Over Yonder	Papa Doom, Glen		
2013–2017	Uncle Grandpa	Mr. Gus, additional voices		
2014–2015	Sheriff Callie's Wild West	Farmer Stinky, Uncle Bun, Dr. Wolf		
2014–2016	The 7D	Happy, Nat King Troll, King Yo		
2014–2016	Turbo Fast	Lester, Rizzo, Ratso, Ball	3 episodes	
2014–2025	Blaze and the Monster Machines	Crusher		
2014–2017	All Hail King Julien	Maurice, various voices		
2015	Penn Zero: Part-Time Hero	Dr. Hissy	Episode: "Babypocalypse"	
2015	Regular Show	Happy Birthday	Episode: "Happy Birthday Song Contest"	
2015	Steven Universe	Mr. Gus	Episode: "Say Uncle"	
2015	Rick and Morty	Frankenstein's Monster, Mrs. Refrigerator, Hamurai	Episode: "Total Rickall"	
2015	Sofia the First	King Kamea	Episode: "Stormy Lani"	
2015	Marvel Super Hero Adventures: Frost Fight!	Groot		
2015–2017	Transformers: Robots in Disguise	Terrashock, Bulkhead, Gallery Narrator		
2015–2017	The Mr. Peabody & Sherman Show	Mansa Musa, Gaius Maecenas, various voices		
2015–2016	TripTank	Doorman, Fox, Assistant Coach, Mantis, Gambling Mercenary	5 episodes	
2015–2018	The Adventures of Puss in Boots	Golem, Thieves, Tom Puddles, Nate, Rams, Boysenberry, Monster Fish		
2015–2018	The Lion Guard	Basi		
2015–2018	Miles from Tomorrowland	Bootjet Groovestar, Prospero, Skellig Ro, Automated Voice, Eyeball Alien, Alien Reporter		
2015–2019	New Looney Tunes	King Thes, Snorts, Happy Hartle, others		
2015–2019	Guardians of the Galaxy	Groot, Heimdall, Mandala, Supreme Intelligence, Blood Brothers, various voices		
2015–2019	Niko and the Sword of Light	Dingle, Lump, Beady Brothers, King Horris, Shrimp Troopers		
2015–2021	F Is for Family	Chauncey "Rosie" Roosevelt, others		
2016–2019	Milo Murphy's Law	Nolan Mitchell, Corporal Wolinsky, additional voices		
2016–2019	Star vs. the Forces of Evil	Rhombulus		
2016–2018	DC Super Hero Girls	Trigon, Mrs. Clayface		
2016–2017	Lego Star Wars: The Freemaker Adventures	Jabba the Hutt, Auctioneer	4 episodes	
2017	Be Cool, Scooby-Doo!	Various voices	2 episodes	
2017	Lego Marvel Super Heroes - Guardians of the Galaxy: The Thanos Threat)	Groot		
2017	Bunsen Is a Beast	Wolfie, Jerry		
2017–2019	The Jellies	Reggie		
2017–2023	Puppy Dog Pals	Bizzy, Dr. Stretcho, Great Dane, Enthusiastic Dog		
2018–2021	Apple & Onion	Beef Jerky, Chicken Nugget, additional voices		
2018–2020	The Boss Baby: Back in Business	Jimbo		
2018	Trolls: The Beat Goes On!	Smidge, various voices		
2018	Big Hero 6: The Series	Jack, Taxi Driver	Episode: "The Impatient Patient"	
2018	Lego Star Wars: All-Stars	Jabba the Hutt, Alien, Growly	2 episodes	
2018	Legend of the Three Caballeros	Felldrake Shelgoose, various voices		
2019–2023	Summer Camp Island	Professor, Toast Ghost, Xylophone, Langston, Waylon, Time, Additional voices	9 episodes	
2019	Amphibia	Mr. Flour, others	Recurring role	
2019	Rapunzel's Tangled Adventure	Otter, Ferry Captain	Episode: "Peril on the High Seas"	
2019	Bless the Harts	Mr. Stikeleather	3 episodes	
2019	Love, Death & Robots	Zima Blue	Episode: "Zima Blue"	
2019	Victor and Valentino	El Colorado	Episode: "Suerte"	
2019–2020	Scooby-Doo and Guess Who?	Various voices		
2019–2020	The Rocketeer	Mayor Primshell		
2019–2020	DC Super Hero Girls	Dex-Starr	2 episodes	
2020	Robot Chicken	Morpheus, Superglue Narrator	Episode: "Buster Olive in: The Monkey Got Closer Overnight"	
2020	Animaniacs	The Zit	Episode: "A Zit!"	
2020	Adventure Time: Distant Lands	Sir Soda, Smudge	Episode: "Obsidian"	
2020–2023	The Owl House	Tarak, additional voices		
2021	Yabba-Dabba Dinosaurs	Barney Rubble, Stretch		
2021	Masters of the Universe: Revelation	Beast Man, Pilgrims, Zalesian Merchant		
2021	Inside Job	Additional voices	Episode: "Blue Bloods"	
2021	Looney Tunes Cartoons	Mad Dog, Butch, Baseball	Episode: "Pitcher Porky"	
2021	Aquaman: King of Atlantis	Royal Commander, Orca	3 episodes	
2021–present	Invincible	Mauler Twins, Monster Girl, additional voices		
2022–2024	Big Nate	Principal Nichols	Main role	
2022–2026	The Proud Family: Louder and Prouder	Papi Boulevardez (laughing), Noisy Monkeys, Radio DJ, Dr. Payne, Omar Phillips		
2022	The Boys Presents: Diabolical	Jack from Jupiter, Ironcast	Episode: "I'm Your Pusher"	
2022	Wolfboy and the Everything Factory	Klaybottom, Noop		
2022	Lego Star Wars: Summer Vacation	Jabba the Hutt		
2022	The Boss Baby: Christmas Bonus	Jimbo		
2023–2024	Frog and Toad	Toad		
2023–present	Futurama	Officer URL, Barbados Slim	Replaces John DiMaggio starting in season eight	
2023	Krapopolis	Iapetus, Bartender, Various	Recurring role	
2024–present	Ariel	Sebastian, additional voices	Main cast	
2025	Bat-Fam	Clayface		
2026	The Legend of Vox Machina	Howaardt Darrington	Episode: "Taryon, My Wayward Son"	
2026	Spidey and His Amazing Friends	Groot		

== Video games ==
Year	Title	Role	Notes	Source
1996	Leisure Suit Larry: Love for Sail!	Johnson, Judge Graham, Judge Paul		
1996	Ace Ventura: The CD-Rom Game	Phatteus Lardus		
1998	Leisure Suit Larry's Casino	Johnson		
1998	Fallout 2	Communications Officer		
1998	King's Quest: Mask of Eternity	Lord Azriel, Lucreto, Prophet Tree		
1998	Baldur's Gate	Narrator, Sarevok, Townsfolk		
1999	T'ai Fu: Wrath of the Tiger	Boar Boss, Crusher Python		
1999	Star Wars Episode I: The Phantom Menace	Vex Drow, Gungan Citizen		
1999	Star Trek: Starfleet Command	Additional Voices		
1999	Revenant	Lucas, Ogrok Chief, Ogrok Torturer		
2000	Star Wars: Force Commander	Builder Shuttle Pilot, Torpedo Launcher Driver, Y-Wing Pilot		
2000	Star Wars Episode I: Jedi Power Battles	Mace Windu, Gungan Guard, Thug #4		
2000	Star Wars: Early Learning Activity Center	Boss Nass		
2000	Star Trek: Klingon Academy	Garlock, Additional Voices		
2000	Star Trek: New Worlds	Additional Voices		
2000	Baldur's Gate II: Shadows of Amn	Sarevok Anchev, Corgeig, Cohrvale		
2000	Star Wars: Demolition	Pugwis, Tamtel Skreej		
2000	Sacrifice	Pyro, Additional Voices		
2000	Star Trek: Deep Space Nine: The Fallen	Benjamin Sisko		
2000	Star Trek: Starfleet Command II: Empires at War	Additional Voices		
2001	Icewind Dale: Heart of Winter	Additional Voice Talent		
2001	Fallout Tactics: Brotherhood of Steel	Additional Voice Talent		
2001	Star Wars: Super Bombad Racing	Boss Nass		
2001	Baldur's Gate II: Throne of Bhaal	Sarevok Anchev, Yaga-Shura, Bhaal, Odren, Ka'rashur	Grouped under "VO Talent"	
2001	The Mummy Returns	Imhotep	Grouped as "Voice Performance"	
2001	Crash Bandicoot: The Wrath of Cortex	Crunch Bandicoot	Credited as Kevin Michael Richards	
2001	Star Wars Rogue Squadron II: Rogue Leader	Transport Captain #4		
2001	Metal Gear Solid 2: Sons of Liberty	Scott Dolph	Also Substance	
2001	Star Wars: Galactic Battlegrounds	Boss Nass, Rebel Trooper		
2001	Tarzan: Untamed	Tantor	Grouped under "Voice Talent"	
2001	Baldur's Gate: Dark Alliance	Sess'sth – Kolgrim	Grouped under "Voice Over Talent"	
2002	Pirates: The Legend of Black Kat	King Neptune		
2002	Clifford the Big Red Dog: Musical Memory Games	DJ Don, Samuel, Lewis Ulysses Cuadra, Vaz		
2002	EOE: Eve of Extinction	Additional voices		
2002	Star Wars: Jedi Starfighter	Mace Windu, TF Refinery Droid, TF Scarab Droid		
2002	Star Wars: Obi-Wan	Eeth Koth, Mace Windu, Male Citizen #1		
2002	Star Wars Jedi Knight II: Jedi Outcast	Reelo Baruk		
2002	Star Wars: Jedi Starfighter	Mace Windu		
2002	Kingdom Hearts	Sebastian	Grouped under "Disney Voice Actors"	
2002	Lilo & Stitch: Trouble in Paradise	Captain Gantu		
2002	Disney's Stitch: Experiment 626	Captain Gantu		
2002	Lilo & Stitch: Hawaiian Adventure	Captain Gantu		
2002	Bruce Lee: Quest of the Dragon	Additional voices		
2002	Soulcalibur II	Heihachi Mishima, Spawn	Credited as Victor Stone	
2002	Superman: Shadow of Apokolips	Darkseid		
2002	Law and Order: Dead on the Money	Mark Rawlins, Leonard Gower		
2002	Run Like Hell	Niles		
2002	Ratchet & Clank	Chairman Drek, Commando, Bouncer		
2002	Star Wars: Bounty Hunter	Sebolto		
2002	The Wild Thornberrys Movie	Shaman Mnyambo		
2003	Indiana Jones and the Emperor's Tomb	Homonculus, Triad Ghoul		
2003	Freelancer	Additional voices		
2003	Enter the Matrix	Thaddeus	Uncredited	
2003	RTX Red Rock	Digitzed Crewmember	Grouped under "Other Voices"	
2003	Star Wars: Knights of the Old Republic	Jolee Bindo		
2003	Lionheart: Legacy of the Crusader	Additional voices		
2003	Law and Order: Double or Nothing	Mark Rawlins		
2003	Viewtiful Joe	Hulk Davidson, Fire Leo		
2003	True Crime: Streets of LA	Additional voices	Credited as Kevin M. Richardson	
2003	Crash Nitro Kart	Crunch Bandicoot, Advisor		
2003	Spawn: Armageddon	Spawn		
2004	Fallout: Brotherhood of Steel	Ghoul High Priest, Cyrus, Grunt, Soldier		
2004	Champions of Norrath	Additional voices		
2004	Galleon	Bo'sun, Sorcerer #1		
2004	Halo 2	Tartarus		
2005	Kingdom Hearts II	Sebastian	Also Final Mix+	
2006	Teen Titans	Mammoth, Trigon		
2006	The Legend of Spyro: A New Beginning	Terrador, The Conductor		
2006	Avatar: The Last Airbender	Additional Voices		
2007	The Legend of Spyro: The Eternal Night	Gaul, Terrador, Sniff		
2008	Emergency Heroes	Captain Walters		
2008	Avatar: The Last Airbender – Into the Inferno	Additional Voices		
2008	The Legend of Spyro: Dawn of the Dragon	Terrador, Chief Prowlus, Hermit		
2008	Ben 10: Alien Force	HighBreed Commander, Forever Knight Ninja		
2010	Kingdom Hearts Birth by Sleep	Captain Gantu		
2010	Batman: The Brave and the Bold – The Videogame	Astaroth, Black Manta		
2011	Skylanders: Spyro's Adventure	Stump Smash		
2011	Star Wars: The Old Republic	Jace Malcom		
2012	Kingdom Hearts 3D: Dream Drop Distance	Black Guard		
2012	Transformers: Prime – The Game	Bulkhead		
2012	Skylanders: Giants	Stump Smash, Tree Rex, Barkley		
2013	Skylanders: Swap Force	Stump Smash, Tree Rex, Barkley	Grouped under "Voice Talent"	
2013	Nickelodeon's Teenage Mutant Ninja Turtles	Shredder		
2013	Young Justice: Legacy	John Stewart		
2014	The Elder Scrolls Online	Sai Sahan		
2014	Skylanders: Trap Team	Stump Smash, Tree Rex, Barkley	Grouped under "Voice Talent"	
2014	Teenage Mutant Ninja Turtles: Danger of the Ooze	Shredder		
2014	World of Warcraft: Warlords of Draenor	Grommash Hellscream	Grouped under "Voice Over Cast"	
2015	Disney Infinity 3.0	Jabba the Hutt, Groot		
2015	Skylanders: SuperChargers	Stump Smash, Tree Rex, Barkley	Grouped under "Voice Talent"	
2016	Teenage Mutant Ninja Turtles: Portal Power	Shredder, Triceraton		
2016	Baldur's Gate: Siege of Dragonspear	Narrator	Grouped under "Voice Over Cast"	
2016	King's Quest – Chapter III: Once Upon A Climb	Chester Hobblepot		
2016	Kingdom Hearts HD 2.8 Final Chapter Prologue	Black Guard A	English dub	
2016–2017	Skylanders: Imaginators	Stump Smash, Tree Rex, Barkley	Uncredited	
2017	Marvel vs. Capcom: Infinite	Groot		
2018	Heroes of the Storm	Blaze		
2019	Crash Team Racing Nitro-Fueled	Stew		
2020	Samurai Jack: Battle Through Time	Demongo, Imakandi Warrior		
2021	Blaze and the Monster Machines: Axle City Racers	Crusher		
2023	Disney Speedstorm	Captain Gantu	Grouped under "Featuring the Voice Talents Of"	
2024	Teenage Mutant Ninja Turtles: Wrath of the Mutants	Shredder, Super Shredder		
2026	Star Wars: Zero Company	Gorga Desilijic Aarrpo		

== Web ==
Year	Title	Role	Notes
2015	Nerdist: COPS: Skyrim	Announcer Guy	Voice
