= Corey Burton =

American voice actor

- Other name: Corey Weinman
- Occupation: Voice actor
- Years active: 1972–present

Corey Weinberg, known professionally as Corey Burton, is an American voice actor known for his roles as Shockwave in The Transformers, Ludwig Von Drake and Captain Hook in Walt Disney Company productions, Brainiac in the DC Animated Universe, Count Dooku and Cad Bane in the Star Wars franchise, Megatron in Transformers: Animated, Zeus in the God of War series, and Hugo Strange in Batman: Arkham City.

== Career ==
=== Early career ===
Burton's grandparents immigrated from Transylvania. Burton was initially hesitant to pursue voice acting due to his shy demeanor and Asperger syndrome, but credits the design and storytelling of Disney's The Haunted Mansion attraction as his inspiration to move forward. He also cited The Adventures of Rocky and Bullwinkle and Friends (which he watched during his childhood) as an inspiration. Burton started his career at age 17 under the stage name Corey Weinman, with an imitation performance of Hans Conried for a filmstrip by Disney, titled Chef Ahmalette's Health Diet. He studied radio acting with Daws Butler for four years and went on to work with nearly all of the original Hollywood radio actors in classic-style radio dramas.

=== Disney ===
Burton has done extensive voice-work for Disney, including animated features and theme park attractions at the Disneyland Resort, Walt Disney World, and Tokyo Disney Resort. He provided the narration for many of the behind-the-scenes programs of Disney movies on many of their VHS issues from the 1990s. He provided the voice of Captain Hook since 1977 and dubbed the voice of Deems Taylor in Fantasia for the film's 2000 and 2010 re-releases.

Burton has voiced sound-alikes and original characters for over 50 Disney Storyteller records. His roles include:

- Ludwig Von Drake since 1987
- Dale and Zipper in Chip 'n Dale Rescue Rangers.
- The How-to Narrator in Goof Troop and later Disney media
- The White Rabbit, Mad Hatter, Dale, Captain Hook, and Chernabog in House of Mouse.
- Gruffi Gummi and Toadwart in Adventures of the Gummi Bears (following the death of Bill Scott).
- Zeus in the animated series Hercules (replacing Rip Torn).
- Quint and Speedy the Snail in Timon & Pumbaa.
- Gaetan "Mole" Molière in Atlantis: The Lost Empire and Atlantis: Milo's Return.
- Ansem the Wise in the Kingdom Hearts series.
- Professor Owl in the Disney Sing-Along Songs series.
- King Stefan in Disney Princess Enchanted Tales: Follow Your Dreams.
- Yen Sid and Captain Hook in the Epic Mickey and Kingdom Hearts series.
- Doc Hudson in various Cars media and Radiator Springs Racers (replacing Paul Newman).
- General Knowledge from the former Cranium Command attraction at Epcot.
- Dale, Bruno Biggs, and Moe Whiplash from Walt Disney World Quest: Magical Racing Tour.

=== Paul Frees ===
Burton, for many years, served as a protégé to voice actor Paul Frees. Following Frees' death and his son Fred's temporary takeover, Burton stepped in and imitated Frees' voice as the Ghost Host in Disneyland's Haunted Mansion Holiday attraction. He also recited the classic line "Welcome, foolish mortals," in the opening of the 2003 film adaption and currently serves as the Ghost Host's voice in every Haunted Mansion franchise-related media, adoptions, and events. He was approached to record a new safety spiel for the intro to the original Haunted Mansion ride. He declined and the spiel was instead recorded by voice actor Joe Leahy.

He provided many other Paul Frees-like voices for Disneyland Park, including several newer pirates in the Pirates of the Caribbean attraction (like the "Pooped Pirate" and the pirate voice that guides the guests on and off the boat), Grumpy on the Seven Dwarfs Mine Train attraction, and several voices in Mr. Toad's Wild Ride.

Burton also performed Frees imitations for comedian Stan Freberg's album Stan Freberg Presents The United States of America, Volume Two, and as the voice of the announcer in the 1999 film Dudley Do-Right, and did likewise as the voices of the alien foreheads in Larry Blamire's 2008 satire Trail of the Screaming Forehead.

=== Transformers ===
Burton appeared as Shockwave, Sunstreaker, Brawn, and Spike Witwicky in the original Transformers animated series by Sunbow Productions and Marvel Productions. He would later voice Megatron, Ratchet, Ironhide, Brawn, Cyrus "The Colossus" Rhodes, Spike, and Longarm Prime/Shockwave in Transformers: Animated by Cartoon Network.

Burton stated in an interview that Shockwave was by far his favorite character to perform in the original series. Despite this, he turned down the offer to reprise the role in Transformers: Dark of the Moon, as he felt he had voiced the character enough times. Consequently, the part was given to Frank Welker, the voice of Megatron/Galvatron.

=== Star Wars ===
For Star Wars, Burton voiced Luke Skywalker in Disney-produced read-along records in 1979-1983, and dubbed one of Hobbie Klivian's lines in The Empire Strikes Back. He also voiced Count Dooku, Cad Bane, and Ziro the Hutt in Star Wars: The Clone Wars, and has continued to voice Bane in Star Wars: The Bad Batch and The Book of Boba Fett. He has also voiced several characters in video games.

=== Kingdom Hearts ===
For the Kingdom Hearts series, Burton voiced Ansem the Wise in Chain of Memories, Birth by Sleep, and Dream Drop Distance due to Christopher Lee's health problems. For the cinematic version of Kingdom Hearts 358/2 Days, Burton re-dubbed Lee's lines that he had previously recorded for the Nintendo DS version. He reprised his role as Ansem for Kingdom Hearts III.

=== Brainiac ===
Burton has portrayed the supervillain Brainiac in the DC Animated Universe. He appeared as the character in Superman: The Animated Series, Justice League, Static Shock, and Justice League Unlimited, as well as the non-DCAU media Legion of Super Heroes, DC Universe Online, and Lego DC Super-Villains.

=== Other work ===
- Played Jerry Lyden in the radio series Alien Worlds.
- Has done work for the Universal Studios theme parks, voicing the Narrator and Snidely Whiplash in Dudley Do-Right's Ripsaw Falls, the Fish and Safety/Emergency Announcer in The Cat in the Hat, Tick-Tack-Joe in If I Ran the Zoo, and the Grinch in Sneech Beach Area and the Seuss Landing Street Show.
- Does voice-overs for Old Navy commercials and a promo for Final Fantasy XII.
- Provided voice-overs for WWE's WrestleMania XXV recap segments.
- Various characters in the 1980 cult classic Closet Cases of the Nerd Kind.
- The titular creatures in the Critters film series.
- Narrator for the video game Brütal Legend.
- Volteer the Electric Guardian Dragon, Exhumor, and Mason in The Legend of Spyro trilogy.
- Zeus in the God of War series.
- Numerous supporting roles on Focus on the Family's radio drama Adventures in Odyssey.
- Doctor N. Gin, Doctor N. Tropy and Nitros Oxide in the Crash Bandicoot series.
- Jack in the theme park attraction The House at Haunted Hill.
- Narrator of the film The A-Team.
- Hugo Strange in Batman: Arkham City and Lego DC Super-Villains.
- John Grey (Jean Grey's father) for Wolverine and the X-Men.
- Provided voice samples for the song "Machete" by DJ Hazard (reused from Grindhouse) and the album Universus by ShockOne.
- Announcer for the Bounty Law promo in Once Upon a Time in Hollywood.
- Announcer for the El Rey Network.
- Played the Narrator and the Guest in Flying Logos.
- Still heard on the safety info for the parking lot trams for Disneyland and Magic Kingdom (as of 2011).

== Filmography ==
=== Film ===
Year	Title	Role	Notes
1980	The Empire Strikes Back	Hobbie Klivian (one line)	Role shared with Robert Clotworthy
1980	Closet Cases of the Nerd Kind	Narrator	Short film
1981	Wolfen	ESS Voice	
1981	Galaxy Express 999	The Conductor	New World Pictures dub
1982	The Sword and the Sorcerer	Additional voices	
1982	The Adventures of Curious George	Curious George, The Man with the Yellow Hat, additional voices	Short film series
1983	Good-bye, Cruel World	Additional voices	
1986	Critters	Critters	
1986	The Transformers: The Movie	Brawn, Shockwave, Spike Witwicky	
1986	Poltergeist II: The Other Side	Reverend Henry Kane (voice)	Uncredited
1986	Disney Sing-Along Songs: Zip-a-Dee-Doo-Dah	Professor Owl	Direct-to-video
1987	Disney Sing-Along Songs: Heigh-Ho	Professor Owl	Direct-to-video
1987	G.I. Joe: The Movie	Tomax	
1987	Spaceballs	Dinks, Apes	Uncredited
1987	Amazon Women on the Moon	Anchorman ("Murray in Videoland"), TV Announcer ("Amazon Women on the Moon"), Announcer ("Silly Pâté")	
1987	Disney Sing-Along Songs: The Bare Necessities	Professor Owl	Direct-to-video
1988	Disney Sing-Along Songs: You Can Fly!	Professor Owl, Ludwig Von Drake	Direct-to-video
1988	Poltergeist III	Reverend Henry Kane (voice)	Uncredited
1989	Tummy Trouble	Orderly	Short film
1989	Disney Sing-Along Songs: Fun with Music	Professor Owl, Ludwig Von Drake	Direct-to-video
1989	Goofy About Health	Narrator	
1989	Cranium Command	General Knowledge, Chicken, Male Recruit, Drill Sergeant	
1990	Roller Coaster Rabbit	Droopy	Short film
1990	Disney Sing-Along Songs: Under the Sea	Professor Owl, Ludwig Von Drake	Direct-to-video
1990	Disney Sing-Along Songs: Disneyland Fun	Professor Owl, White Rabbit, Dale	Uncredited; Direct-to-video
1991	Disney Sing-Along Songs: Supercalifragilisticexpialidocious	Professor Owl, Ludwig Von Drake	
1992	Disney Sing-Along Songs: Be Our Guest	Professor Owl	Direct-to-video
1992	Aladdin	Prince Achmed, Necklace Merchant	
1993	Trail Mix-Up	Droopy	Short film
1994	Mickey's Fun Songs: Campout at Walt Disney World	Dale	Direct-to-video
1994	Disney Sing-Along Songs: Circle of Life	Professor Owl	Direct-to-video
1995	A Goofy Movie	Wendall	
1995	Disney Sing-Along Songs: Colors of the Wind	Professor Owl, Ludwig Von Drake	Direct-to-video
1995	Mickey's Fun Songs: Beach Party at Walt Disney World	Dale, Captain Hook, Mr. Smee	Direct-to-video
1996	The Hunchback of Notre Dame	Brutish Guard, Additional Voices	
1996	Aladdin and the King of Thieves	Hakim, Additional Voices	Direct-to-video
1997	Hercules	Burnt Man	
1997	Disney Sing-Along Songs: Zero to Hero	Professor Owl	Direct-to-video
1998	Mulan	Male Ancestor	
1998	The Spirit of Mickey	Ludwig Von Drake	
1998	Disney Sing-Along Songs: Honor to Us All	Professor Owl	Direct-to-video
1998	Kiki's Delivery Service	Radio Announcer	Disney English dub
1999	Tarzan	Butch Jones	
1999	Dudley Do-Right	The Announcer	
1999	Princess Mononoke	Osa	English dub
1999	Mickey's Once Upon a Christmas	Dale	Direct-to-video
1999	Toy Story 2	Woody's Roundup Announcer	
2001	The Trumpet of the Swan	Senator	
2001	Atlantis: The Lost Empire	Gaëtan "Mole" Molière	
2001	Mickey's Magical Christmas: Snowed in at the House of Mouse	Ludwig Von Drake, Gus, Grumpy, Captain Hook, Mad Hatter	Direct-to-video
2002	Return to Never Land	Captain Hook	
2002	The Wacky Adventures of Ronald McDonald: Have Time, Will Travel	Bug, Mob Man #1	Direct-to-video
2002	Cinderella II: Dreams Come True	Gus, Mert, Stable Hand	Direct-to-video
2002	Mickey's House of Villains	Captain Hook, Chernabog	Direct-to-video
2002	Treasure Planet	Onus	
2003	101 Dalmatians II: Patch's London Adventure	The Thunderbolt Adventure Hour Narrator	Direct-to-video
2003	Castle in the Sky	Additional Voices	Disney dub
2003	Atlantis: Milo's Return	Gaëtan "Mole" Molière	Direct-to-video
2003	Stitch! The Movie	Hawaiian Man	Direct-to-video
2004	The Lion King 1½	Grumpy (cameo)	Direct-to-video
2004	Mickey's Twice Upon a Christmas	Elf #4	Direct-to-video
2005	Tom and Jerry: Blast Off to Mars	Martian Scientist, Court Attendant, Eyes at Gate	Direct-to-video
2005	Porco Rosso	Captain	Walt Disney Pictures dub
2005	My Neighbors the Yamadas	Biker #2	English dub
2005	Once Upon a Halloween	Cauldron	Direct-to-video
2006	Whisper of the Heart	Minami	English dub
2007	Cinderella III: A Twist in Time	Gus	Direct-to-video
2007	Planet Terror	Additional Narrator	
2007	Asterix and the Vikings	Doublehelix	English dub
2007	Disney Princess Enchanted Tales: Follow Your Dreams	King Stefan	Direct-to-video
2007	How to Hook Up Your Home Theater	Narrator	
2008	Justice League: The New Frontier	Abin Sur	Direct-to-video
2008	Batman: Gotham Knight	Scarecrow, Yuri Dimitrov	Direct-to-video
2008	Starship Troopers 3: Marauder	Official Voice	Direct-to-video
2008	Star Wars: The Clone Wars	Whorm Loathsom, Ziro the Hutt, Kronos-327	
2009	Superman/Batman: Public Enemies	Captain Marvel	Direct-to-video
2009	The Princess and the Frog	Harvey Fenner	
2010	The A-Team	Narrator	
2012	Hotel Transylvania	Mr. Bigfoot	
2012	Goodnight Mr. Foot	Mr. Bigfoot	Short film
2012	Partysaurus Rex	Captain Suds	Short film
2013	Zambezia	Neville	
2013	Machete Kills	Trailer Voice Guy	
2013	I Know That Voice	Himself	Documentary
2014	JLA Adventures: Trapped in Time	Captain Cold, Time Trapper	Direct-to-video
2014	Scooby-Doo! WrestleMania Mystery	Bayard, Announcer	Direct-to-video
2014	Scooby-Doo! Frankencreepy	Baron Basil, Ghost of the Baron	Direct-to-video
2014	Rocky & Bullwinkle	Snidely Whiplash, Mayor	Short film
2016	Quentin Tarantino's Suicide Squad	The Voice	Parody trailer
2018	Ralph Breaks the Internet	Grumpy	Cameo
2019	Once Upon a Time in Hollywood	Bounty Law Promo Announcer	
2020	Phineas and Ferb the Movie: Candace Against the Universe	Farmer	Disney+ film
2022	Chip 'n Dale: Rescue Rangers	Dale, Zipper (High-Pitched)	Disney+ film
2023	Lego Disney Princess: The Castle Quest	Magic Mirror	Disney+ film
2024	Watchmen Chapter 1	Captain Metropolis	Direct-to-video
2025	The Fantastic Four: First Steps	Ted Gillbert Announcer	
2025	Lego Disney Princess: Villains Unite	Magic Mirror	Disney+ film

=== Television ===
Year	Title	Role	Notes
1981	Spider-Man	Lizard	
1984–87	The Transformers	Brawn, Shockwave, Sunstreaker, Spike Witwicky, Wideload, Additional Voices	
1985	Robotix	Tauron, Goon, Kanawk	
1985–86	G.I. Joe: A Real American Hero	Tomax, Lt. Clay Moore, Owen Van Mark, Gerky Potemkin	
1986	DTV Valentine	Gruffi Gummi	
1986–91	Adventures of the Gummi Bears	Gruffi Gummi, Toadwart, Additional Voices	Replacing Bill Scott
1987–89	DuckTales	Ludwig Von Drake, Phil Barker, Additional Voices	
1988	ABC Weekend Special	Chum	Episode: "Runaway Ralph"
1989–90	Chip 'n Dale: Rescue Rangers	Dale, Zipper, Mole, Snout, Additional Voices	
1990	The Magical World of Disney	Ludwig Von Drake	Episode: "A DuckTales Valentine"
1991–92	James Bond Jr.	James Bond Jr.	
1992	Goof Troop	How-to Narrator, Circus Ringmaster	
1992	Raw Toonage	Ludwig Von Drake, Captain Hook	
1992	Darkwing Duck	Rubber Chicken	Episode: "Mutantcy on the Bouncy"
1993–94	Bonkers	Ludwig Von Drake, Mad Hatter, additional voices	
1993–94	Mighty Max	Felix, Osiris	
1995	The Shnookums & Meat Funny Cartoon Show	Ian, Percy Lacedaisy, Krusty Rustknuckle, Ultra Guy Man Dude	
1995–99	Timon & Pumbaa	Quint, Speedy the Snail, Creepy Fortune Teller	
1995–96	Phantom 2040	23rd Phantom, Biot #1, Security Biot #2, 20th Phantom, Thin Man	
1996	Quack Pack	Ludwig Von Drake	
1996	Tales from the Crypt	Chief Wolf	Episode: "The Third Pig"
1996–98	Pinky and the Brain	Cushing, Technician, Van Spoony, Strawboater, Clown	5 episodes
1996–98	Superman: The Animated Series	Brainiac, Binko, Store Owner	11 episodes
1997	Freakazoid!	Ahmon Kor-Unch / Invisibo	Episode: "Tomb of Invisibo"
1997–98	The Sylvester & Tweety Mysteries	Count, Jack, Babbit, Hamilton Meatball, Tosh, Rotha Khan, Engineer #1, Veterinarian #3	7 episodes
1997–98	The New Batman Adventures	Uniformed Cop, Strongman	2 episodes
1997–98	Animaniacs	Duke, Director	2 episodes
1998	Oh Yeah! Cartoons	Sheisty	Episode: "Tales from the Goose Lady: Jack and the Beanstalk"
1998–99	Hercules	Zeus	
1999–2001	Batman Beyond	Vilmos Egans, Barge Captain, General Norman, Istivan Hegedesh, Kobra Op #1, Captain	6 episodes
1999–2000	Mickey Mouse Works	Ludwig Von Drake, J. Audubon Woodlore, Chief O'Hara, How-to Narrator	
1999	Boo Boo Runs Wild	Ranger Smith, Moose	
1999	A Day in the Life of Ranger Smith	Ranger Smith	
1999	Johnny Bravo	Muy Caliente	Episode: "El Bravo Magnifico"
1999	Mike, Lu & Og	Queeks	5 episodes
2000	Poochini's Yard	Additional Voices	
2000	Buzz Lightyear of Star Command	Brent Starkisser, Floyd, Tour Guide, Hammerhold, Treevo, General, Soldier #2, Judge #2	10 episodes
2001–03	House of Mouse	Ludwig Von Drake, J. Audubon Woodlore, Grumpy, Timothy Q. Mouse, Cards, Tweedle Dee, Tweedle Dum, White Rabbit, Mad Hatter, Captain Hook, Maurice, Zeus, Chernabog, Doorknob, Santa Claus, Caterpillar	
2001–03	Justice League	Brainiac, Metallo, Toyman, Weather Wizard, Dr. Blizzard, Bald Technician	
2002	Totally Spies!	Simon Tucker	Episode: "Malled"
2002, 2017	Samurai Jack	Monk #1, Goatman, The Murder of Crows	2 episodes
2003–06	The Adventures of Jimmy Neutron: Boy Genius	Rayburn, Dr. Dark, Pizza Monster, Head Monk, Spamdini	
2003	Static Shock	Brainiac	Episode: "A League of Their Own"
2003	The Powerpuff Girls	Burglar	Episode: "Burglar Alarmed"
2003	Dexter's Laboratory	The Narrator	Episode: "The Lab of Tomorrow"
2003–05	Star Wars: Clone Wars	Count Dooku, San Hill, Warrior #2	
2004	ChalkZone	King Mumbo Jumbo, Stick Figure Baker	Episode: "The Big Blow Up"
2004–06	Hi Hi Puffy AmiYumi	Various	
2005	Duck Dodgers	Martian Commander Z-9	Episode: "Of Course You Know, This Means War and Peace"
2005–06	Justice League Unlimited	Brainiac	5 episodes
2006	Korgoth of Barbaria	Specules, Doorman, Henchman #2	Television pilot
2006–14	The Boondocks	Various	
2006–16	Mickey Mouse Clubhouse	Ludwig Von Drake, Dale	
2006–07	Squirrel Boy	Ranger Stu	
2007–09	Transformers: Animated	Ratchet, Megatron, Shockwave, Ironhide, Spike Witwicky, Additional Voices	
2007–08	Legion of Super Heroes	Brainiac	3 episodes
2008	Chowder	Sour Ron, Sour Guard #2	Episode: "The Puckerberry Overlords"
2008–20	Star Wars: The Clone Wars	Count Dooku, Cad Bane, Ziro the Hutt, others	
2008–10	The Secret Saturdays	V.V. Argost, Leonidas Van Rook	
2008–11	Batman: The Brave and the Bold	Red Tornado, Silver Cyclone, Thomas Wayne, Doctor Mid-Nite, Will Magnus, Mercury, General Zahl, Batman (Bat-Manga), Killer Moth, Alan Scott	
2008–15	Phineas and Ferb	Farmer, Additional Voices	
2010	Freaknik: The Musical	Newscaster, Dukes of Hazzard Announcer	Television special
2010–11	Sym-Bionic Titan	Galalunian Commander, Combat Instructor, Academy Administrator	
2011	G.I. Joe: Renegades	Law, Granger, Crippled Convict	
2011–16	Jake and the Never Land Pirates	Captain Hook, Tiki Trees	
2011–12	ThunderCats	Jaga, Tygus	
2011–12	Black Dynamite	Dennis Flynn	
2011–12	Young Justice	Brain, Dudley H. Dudley, Hamilton Hill, Wizard, James Gordon	
2012	Green Lantern: The Animated Series	Cleric Loran, Leph	
2012–14	Ben 10: Omniverse	Malware, Brainstorm, Mr. Baumann, Seebik, V.V. Argost, Kangaroo Kamando, Starbeard, Fiskerton	
2012–15	Gravity Falls	Additional Voices	
2013–18	Avengers Assemble	Dracula, Agamotto	
2013	Ultimate Spider-Man	Dracula	
2013	Sofia the First	Wombeast	Episode: "Great Aunt-Venture"
2014–15	Wander Over Yonder	Captain, Additional Voices	
2014–15	Hulk and the Agents of S.M.A.S.H.	High Evolutionary, Dracula	
2014–19	Mickey Mouse	Ludwig Von Drake, Dale	
2015–17	Clarence	Hank	
2015–17	Niko and the Sword of Light	Jackal, Secretary Offishhish, Buzz	
2015–17	Harvey Beaks	Title Card Narrator	
2015	Star vs. the Forces of Evil	Monster Arm	Episode: "Monster Arm"
2015	The 7D	Lord Grudgemunger	Episode: "The Rock of Sages"
2015	Penn Zero: Part-Time Hero	Additional Voices	
2015–16	Star Wars Rebels	Gobi Glie, Quarrie, Eesh Fahm, Argin Relik, Rake Gahree, Additional Voices	
2016	Uncle Grandpa	Additional Voices	Episode: "Chill Out"
2016–18	Future-Worm!	Narrator	
2017	Lego Star Wars: The Freemaker Adventures	Quarrie, Awan Zek, Additional Voices	
2017–21	Mickey Mouse Mixed-Up Adventures	Ludwig Von Drake, Dale	
2018–21	DuckTales	B.U.D.D.Y., Liquidator, Ludwig Von Drake, Corvus Von Drake, Yellow Beak	
2020	Looney Tunes Cartoons	Ghost, Monster #2, Announcer	
2020–21	Animaniacs	Tedward R. Gurrowl, Senator Smith, Announcer	2 episodes
2021–24	Star Wars: The Bad Batch	Cad Bane, Gobi Glie	
2021–25	Mickey Mouse Funhouse	Ludwig Von Drake, Dale	
2022	The Book of Boba Fett	Cad Bane	Played on-set by Dorian Kingi
2022	Amphibia	Military General, News Anchor	Episode: "All In"
2022	Tales of the Jedi	Count Dooku	
2022	Hamster & Gretel	Farmer	Episode: "A Mammoth Problem"
2023	Ted Lasso	The True Spirit of Adventure	Episode: "Sunflowers"
2024	Star Wars: Young Jedi Adventures	Captain Blackbolt	2 episodes
2024	Delicious in Dungeon	Mr. Tansu	4 episodes
2024	Batman: Caped Crusader	Jack Ryder, Police Radio	Episode: "The Night of the Hunters"
2025	Mickey Mouse Clubhouse+	Ludwig Von Drake, Dale	

=== Video games ===
Year	Title	Role	Notes
1982	Tron: Solar Sailer	Tron	
1989	Disney's Cartoon Arcade	Ludwig von Drake	
1996	Toonstruck	The Footman, Bricabrac, Goggles, WACME Quiz Master	
1996	Down in the Dumps	Galaxy of Fortune Announcer, Hubert, Majordomo	
1996, 1998	The Walt Disney World Explorer	Narrator	
1999	Superman 64	Brainiac	
1999	Disney's Villains' Revenge	Captain Hook, Mr. Smee, White Rabbit, Ringmaster	
1999	Gabriel Knight 3: Blood of the Sacred, Blood of the Damned	Mesmi, Larry Chester, Vampire #2	
2000	Walt Disney World Quest: Magical Racing Tour	Dale, Moe Whiplash, Bruno Biggs	
2000	Mickey's Speedway USA	Professor Ludwig Von Drake	
2000	Donald Duck: Goin' Quackers	Merlock, Gladstone Gander	
2001	Atlantis: The Lost Empire	Gaëtan "Mole" Molière	
2001	Aladdin in Nasira's Revenge	Apple Vendor, Charmer	
2001	Crash Bandicoot: The Wrath of Cortex	Doctor N. Gin, Doctor Nefarious Tropy	
2001	Star Wars: Galactic Battlegrounds	Count Dooku, Jedi Starfighter Pilot, General Tal Ashen	
2001	Final Fantasy X	Tromell Guado, Kelk Ronso	
2002	Kingdom Hearts	Captain Hook, White Rabbit, The Doorknob, Flotsam, Jetsam	
2002	Disney Golf	Ludwig Von Drake	
2002	Star Wars: The Clone Wars	Battle Droid Scout, Count Dooku	
2002	Star Wars: Bounty Hunter	Count Dooku, Prison Guard #1	
2002	Treasure Planet: Battle at Procyon	Cragorian Crew, Cragorian Captain, Optoc Crew, Optoc Commander, Macriki Crew	
2002	Superman: Shadow of Apokolips	Inter-bot Leader, Guard #2, Prisoner	
2003	Metal Arms: Glitch in the System	Colonel Alloy	
2004	The Nightmare Before Christmas: Oogie's Revenge	Santa Claus	
2004	Final Fantasy X-2	Tromell Guado	
2004	EverQuest II	Wizard, Merchant Ihean, Ambassador T'Kirr, Vladiminn	
2004	Kingdom Hearts: Chain of Memories	Ansem the Wise	
2005	Star Wars Episode III: Revenge of the Sith	Count Dooku, Rune Haako, Additional Voices	
2005	Star Wars: Battlefront II	Count Dooku, Imperial Officers, Ki Adi Mundi	
2005	True Crime: New York City	Additional Voices	
2006	Kingdom Hearts II	Dale, Yen Sid, Shan Yu, Flotsam, Jetsam, Santa Claus, Peddler, Sark, Master Control Program	
2006	The Legend of Spyro: A New Beginning	Volteer, Exhumor	
2007	God of War II	Zeus	
2007	Kingdom Hearts II Final Mix+	Yen Sid, Dale, Sark, Master Control Program, Santa Claus, Shan Yu, The Peddler	
2007	The Legend of Spyro: The Eternal Night	Volteer, Exhumor	
2007	Cars Mater-National Championship	Doc Hudson	
2007	Disney Princess: Enchanted Journey	Gus, Grumpy	
2008	The Legend of Spyro: Dawn of the Dragon	Volteer, Mason	
2008	Grand Chase	Dungeon of Monsters	
2008	Transformers Animated: The Game	Megatron, Ratchet, Shockwave	
2008	Kingdom Hearts Re:Chain of Memories	DiZ, Captain Hook	
2009	Brütal Legend	Narrator	
2009	Star Wars: The Clone Wars – Republic Heroes	Count Dooku, Cad Bane	
2009	Cars Race-O-Rama	Doc Hudson	
2009	The Secret Saturdays: Beasts of the 5th Sun	V.V. Argost	
2010	God of War III	Zeus	
2010	Kingdom Hearts Birth by Sleep	Ansem the Wise, Yen Sid, Captain Hook, Dale, Magic Mirror	
2010	Batman: The Brave and the Bold – The Videogame	Red Tornado, Museum Guide, Weather Wizard	
2010	Epic Mickey	Yen Sid, Captain Hook	
2011	Kingdom Hearts Re:coded	Dale, Yen Sid	
2011	DC Universe Online	Brainiac	
2011	Lego Star Wars III: The Clone Wars	Count Dooku	
2011	Nicktoons MLB	Powdered Toast Man	
2011	Batman: Arkham City	Hugo Strange	
2011	Kinect: Disneyland Adventures	Dale, Mad Hatter, Captain Hook, Ghost Host	
2011	Batman: Arkham City Lockdown	Hugo Strange	
2011	Star Wars: The Old Republic	Darth Serevin, Jedi Master Jun Seros, Supreme Commander Rans, Bas-Ton, Doctor Meln, Donal Kraay, Lord Varos, Mar-Da, Master Ostar-Gal, Palawa Leader, Slam Streever, Vendor, Vicebaron Heitor, Yuleph Phan	
2012	Kingdom Hearts 3D: Dream Drop Distance	Ansem the Wise	
2012	Kinect Star Wars	Count Dooku, Darth Ror	
2012	Epic Mickey 2: The Power of Two	Yen Sid	
2012	Epic Mickey: Power of Illusion	Captain Hook	
2012	Ben 10: Omniverse	Malware	
2013	Kingdom Hearts HD 1.5 Remix	Ansem the Wise	Archived footage
2014	Disney Magical World	Dale, Grumpy, Yen Sid, The Doorknob, Mad Hatter, Captain Hook	
2014	Kingdom Hearts HD 2.5 Remix	Various	Archived footage
2014	Fantasia: Music Evolved	Yen Sid	
2015	Disney Infinity 3.0	Cad Bane	
2017	Kingdom Hearts HD 2.8 Final Chapter Prologue	Ansem the Wise, Yen Sid, Claude Frollo	Archived footage
2017	Kingdom Hearts HD 1.5 + 2.5 Remix	DiZ, Ansem the Wise, Yen Sid	Archived footage
2017	Crash Bandicoot N. Sane Trilogy	Dr. N. Gin, Dr. N. Tropy, Baby Cortex	
2017	Star Wars Battlefront II	Count Dooku	
2018	God of War	Zeus	
2018	Lego DC Super-Villains	Hugo Strange, Virman Vundabar, Brainiac, Spectre, Kanto, Toyman	
2019	Kingdom Hearts III	Ansem the Wise, Yen Sid, Dale, Zeus	
2019	Crash Team Racing Nitro-Fueled	Dr. N. Gin, Nitros Oxide, Dr. Nefarious Tropy	
2020	Crash Bandicoot 4: It's About Time	Dr. N. Gin, Nitros Oxide	
2020	Kingdom Hearts: Melody of Memory	Ansem the Wise, Yen Sid	
2021	Crash Bandicoot: On the Run!	Dr. N. Gin, Nitros Oxide	
2022	Lego Star Wars: The Skywalker Saga	Count Dooku	
2024	Suicide Squad: Kill the Justice League	Lex Luthor	
2025	Disney Speedstorm	Dale, Mad Hatter, Captain Hook	
2025	Disney Villains Cursed Café	Captain Hook, Magic Mirror	

=== Radio ===
Year	Title	Role	Notes
1979–80	Alien Worlds	Starlab Controller Jerry Lyden, Research Assistant Tim	26 episodes
1991–2008	Adventures in Odyssey	Bryan Dern, Walter Shakespeare, various voices	124 episodes

=== Theme parks ===
- Alice in Wonderland – White Rabbit, Tweedle Dee, Tweedle Dum, Playing Cards
- Cranium Command – General Knowledge, Chicken, Male Recruit, Drill Sergeant
- Dudley Do-Right's Ripsaw Falls – Snidely Whiplash, Narrator
- Fantasmic! – Chernabog, Captain Hook, Magic Mirror, Pirates
- Festival of Fantasy Parade – Opening Spiel (2014–20)
- Haunted Mansion Holiday – Ghost Host
- Horizons – Futureport "Brava Centauri" Announcer
- If I Ran the Zoo – Tick-Tack-Joe
- Journey Into Your Imagination – Figment
- Mickey and Friends Parking Tram – Spiel
- Mr. Toad's Wild Ride – Cop, Judge, Farmer
- O Canada! – Invisible Narrator (2007–19)
- Parking Lot Trams – Safety Spiel
- Peter Pan's Flight – Captain Hook, Mr. Smee
- Pirates of the Caribbean – Stuffed Pirate, Safety Spiel
- Radiator Springs Racers – Doc Hudson
- Seven Dwarfs Mine Train – Grumpy
- Sneech Beach Area – Grinch
- Seuss Landing Street Show – Grinch
- Tapestry of Nations – Sage of Time
- The Cat in the Hat – Fish, Safety/Emergency Announcer
- The House at Haunted Hill – Jack
- Walt Disney World Railroad – Conductor Spiel (2022–present)
- Wonders of Life – Narrator

== Awards and nominations ==
Year	Award	Category	Title	Result
2003	Annie Award	Outstanding Voice Acting in an Animated Feature Production	Return to Neverland	Nominated
2003	Annie Award	Outstanding Voice Acting in an Animated Television Production	House of Mouse	Won
2011	Annie Award	Best Voice Acting in an Animated Television Production	Star Wars: The Clone Wars	Nominated
