= Dudley Do-Right's Ripsaw Falls =

Attraction at Islands of Adventure

Coordinates: 28.4693°N 81.4718°W

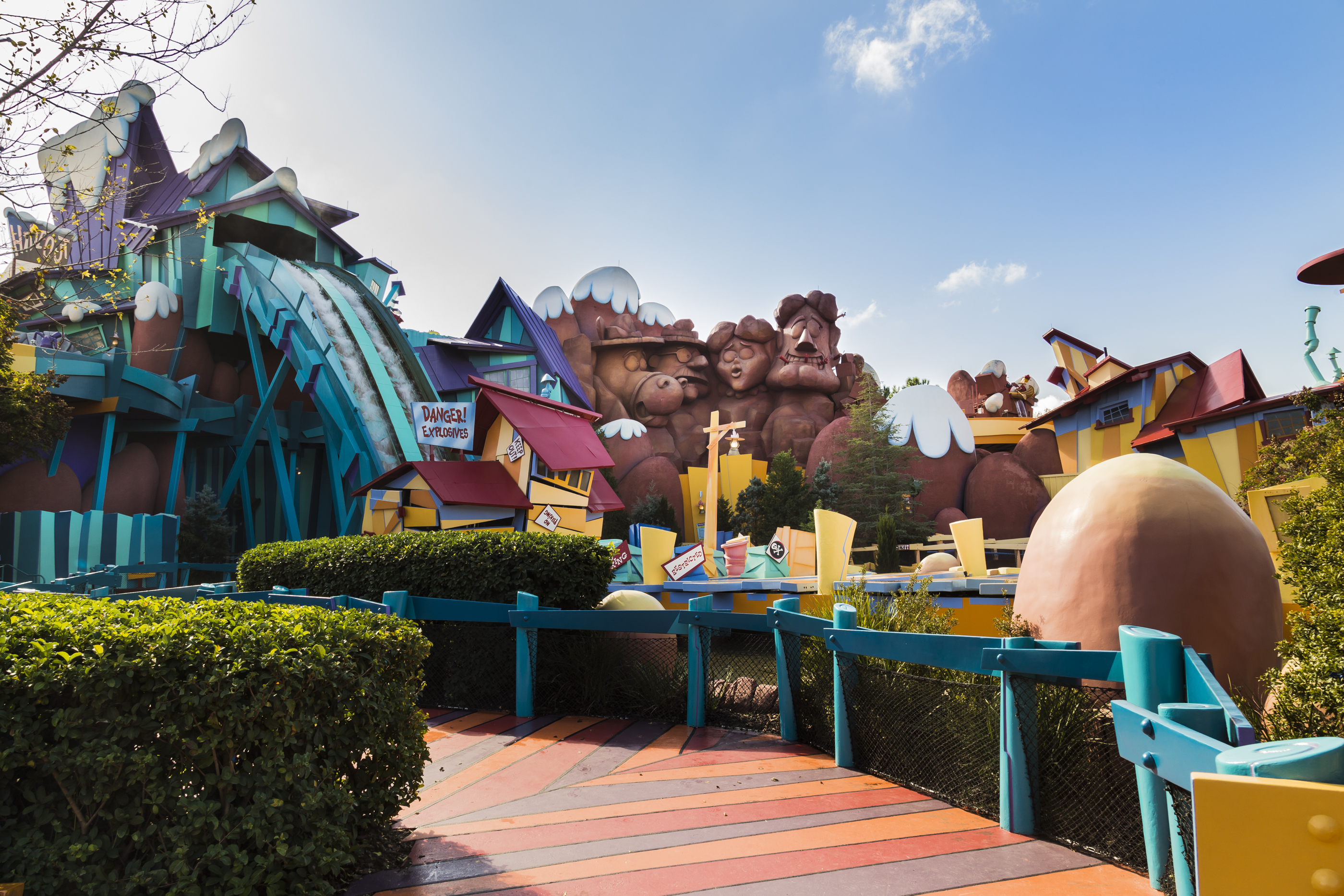
- Dudley Do-Right's Ripsaw Falls in 2013

Universal Islands of Adventure
- Area: Toon Lagoon
- Status: Operating
- Opening date: May 28, 1999

General statistics
- Type: Flume
- Manufacturer: Mack Rides
- Height: 60 ft (18 m)
- Drop: 75 ft (23 m)
- Speed: 45 mph (72 km/h)
- Max vertical angle: 50°
- Duration: 5 minutes, 30 seconds
- Height restriction: 44 in (112 cm)
- Theme: Dudley Do-Right
- Universal Express available
- Single rider line available

Dudley Do-Right's Ripsaw Falls is a log flume ride at Universal Islands of Adventure in Orlando, Florida, inspired by the Dudley Do-Right character created by cartoonists Jay Ward and Alex Anderson. Opened on May 28, 1999, it is one of the park's original attractions.

== Queue area ==
The attraction's queue area passes through: Snidely Whiplash's hideout; a theater that spoofs movies such as Jaws, The Silence of the Lambs, E.T. the Extra-Terrestrial, Three Men and a Baby and Star Wars; and a room with a talking bear head and a talking beaver head on a wall, parodying Country Bear Jamboree at Magic Kingdom and Tokyo Disneyland (the two animal heads reference the attraction - "Who ever heard of a country-singing bear?", to which they immediately follow up with "Well, I guess it's a small world after all!" in a reference to It's a Small World at Disney Parks). While passing through the theater room of the queue, guests watch as Nell Fenwick is kidnapped from her dressing room, setting up the ride's main story. Throughout the queue and in the loading area, there are black and white screens showing a preview of a fictional cartoon, "RipSaw Falls". (The footage was animated by Universal Animation Studios)

== Ride ==
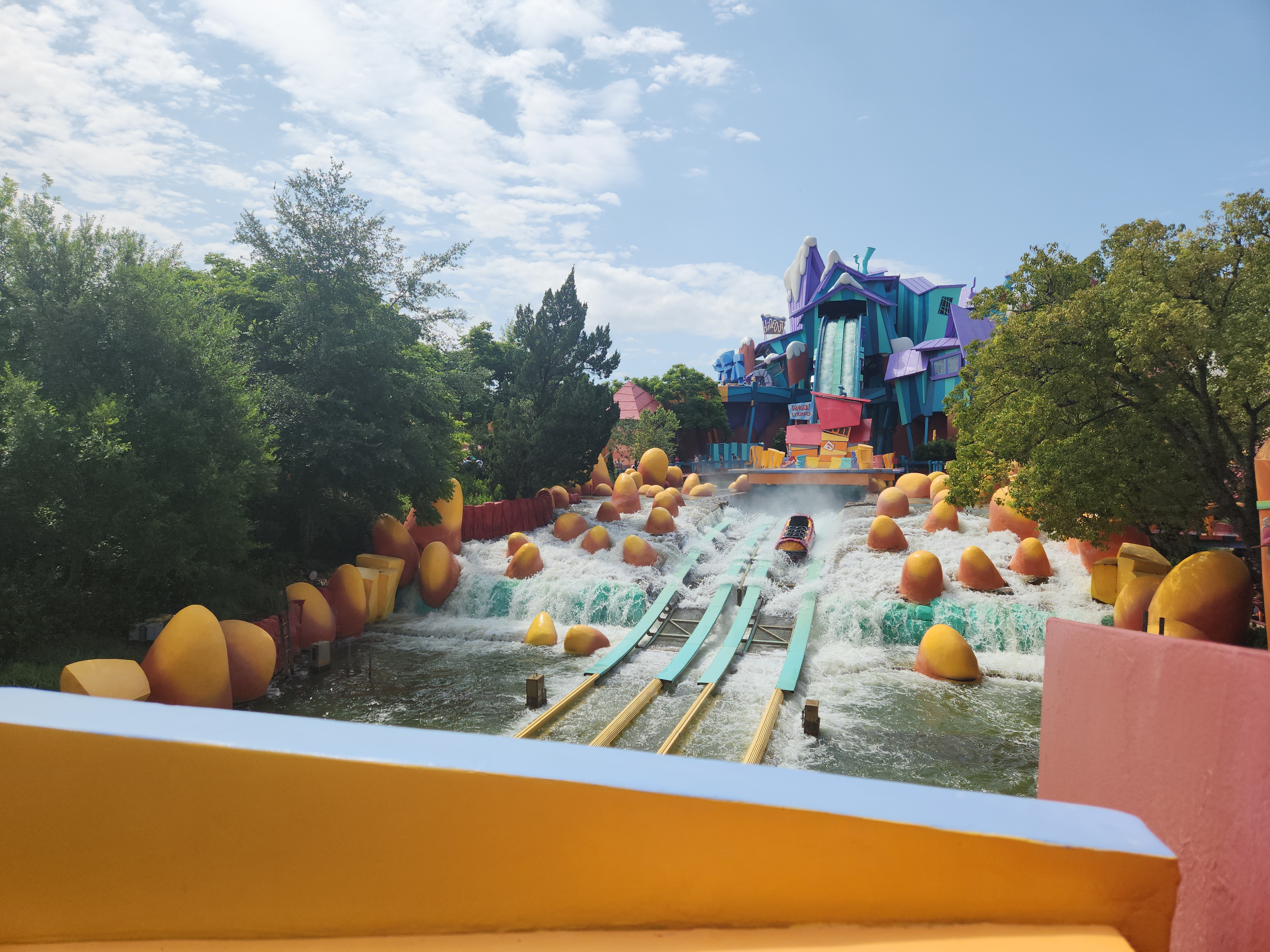
The final drop to Ripsaw Falls.

Once passengers have been placed in the log, it enters the first room where lights shine on forest animals in a black and white color scheme while instruments are played (parodying Splash Mountain at Tokyo Disneyland). The log turns to the right and starts up the first chain lift hill, while Dudley is seen riding Horse backwards up the slope alongside riders. Snidely is later seen riding a mine cart down the other side of the lift, laughing at his accomplishment of kidnapping Nell.

The route takes the ride outdoors before taking a turn and entering Wontyabe Mine. Dudley tells Horse that he cannot see anything, but riders can see that a large bear is behind him. Next, the ride passes by Snidely, who is tying Nell with a rope to the train tracks. The ride then passes by Horse and Inspector Fenwick, both of whom are also tied to the tracks.

The ride then enters a cave where a giant train light is seen and the sound of the engine is heard (a parody of the scene in Mr. Toad's Wild Ride at Disneyland). After the light goes out, the log drops into a small airtime hill before splashing down, drenching riders.

Passengers then travel into an outdoor sawmill where Nell is tied to a log headed for a rotating buzz saw whilst Snidley and Dudley fight over the lever that operates the conveyor. After dropping to ground level, riders are shown signs telling them to turn around. The ride then climbs the second lift hill. At the crest, the ride enters Snidely's lair, where the log can go into either the left or right path. At this Nell fires Snidley from a cannon. We see Dudley triumphantly place his foot on a dynamite plunger, setting off an explosion.

The ride then makes its climactic drop, plunging 75 feet into a dynamite shack. When the log is under the shack, the shack "explodes," spraying passengers and spectators with water. The ride climbs its last hill, then drops into the splash down pool.

Next, the ride curves towards nine hoses. Spectators can pay a fee of $1 to spray riders with water from the hoses.

The ride then enters the Alottapoopoo Island Prison, where Snidley is being held. He attempts to convince a beaver holding the key in its mouth to give the keys to him (a parody of the Pirates of the Caribbean ride at Disney Parks). The log passes through one last scene where Dudley is being awarded a medal by Inspector Fenwick for capturing Snidley and saving his daughter Nell. The narrator concludes the ride by saying, "And so our hero proves that a Mountie always gets his man, but not always...his girl." Riders see Dudley being presented a medal by Inspector Fenwick, while Nell kisses Horse and a lively rendition of the Dudley Do-Right theme song plays in the background.

== Voice cast ==
- Dudley Do-Right: Keith Scott
- Nell Fenwick: June Foray
- Snidley Whiplash: Corey Burton
- Inspector Fenwick: Keith Scott
- Narrator: Corey Burton
- Bear: Dom DeLuise
- Beaver: Charles Nelson Reilly

== Modifications ==
Three major renovations have been made to this ride. The first modification came in 2004 to the main drop. Originally the drop began at a 45-degree angle then descended to 50 degrees as the drop progressed. This was changed due to complaints of roughness to a constant 50-degree drop. One of the modifications was the addition of lap bar restraints in 2007, making it one of the few attractions of its type to use them, and most recently, an on-ride camera was added. Since then, some minor refurbishments have resulted in the ride being closed, though only for a day or two at a time.

== Incident ==
On January 1, 2011, a major fire broke out in a building behind the ride at around 5 p.m. It was contained and extinguished soon afterwards. The Toon Lagoon section was evacuated. No injuries or fatalities were reported. The ride was closed, and a scheduled refurbishment was pushed forward and initiated immediately. The ride was reopened on March 14, 2011, with all special effects restored and the entire ride repainted.
