= Samuel Harjanne =

Finnish director (born 1987)

- Born: 22 December 1987 (age 38); Finland
- Occupations: Director, Actor, Voice Over Artist
- Years active: 1997–present

Samuel Harjanne (born 22 December 1987) is a director and actor originally from Finland.

== Life and career ==
He is currently living in Denmark. Before his career as a director, he performed voice-dubbing roles in the Finnish language for foreign media, including major character roles, as well as in various musicals in the Finnish and Swedish speaking theatres in Finland. He has directed and/or acted in theaters in Finland, such as: Helsinki City Theatre, Åbo Svenska Teater, Turku City Theatre, Wasa Teater, Tampereen Työväen Teatteri and Tampereen teatteri. He has directed many musicals, ranging from Disney to Altar Boyz, and since the success of his production of Kinky Boots in Helsinki 2018, he is considered a notable musical theatre director of Finland.

Internationally he has been directing in the United Kingdom, Sweden and Estonia.

His works include new productions of Come From Away, Matilda and Anastasia.

He is the founder of Harjanne Company Ltd

== Theatre works ==
=== Theatre director ===
- Altar Boyz – Helsinki – Finland, 2008
- The Wedding Singer – Pietarsaari – Finland, 2010
- You're A Good Man, Charlie Brown – Porvoo – Finland, 2011
- Aladdin – Helsinki – Finland, 2012
- I Love You, You're Perfect, Now Change – Finnish Tour 2014
- The Three Little Pigs – Helsinki – Finland, 2014 / Finnish tour, 2015
- Loserville – Guildford – United Kingdom, 2015
- Don't Run – A New Musical – London – United Kingdom, 2015
- Käyttöohje kahdelle – Helsinki – Finland, 2016
- Spring Awakening – Tampere – Finland, 2017
- Les Misérables – Tallinn & Tartu – Estonia, 2017
- Billy Elliot – Tampere – Finland, 2018
- Kinky Boots – Helsinki & Tampere – Finland, 2018 & 2020
- Disney's The Little Mermaid – Helsinki – Finland, 2019
- Groundhog Day – Helsinki – Finland, 2020
- Maailma on tehty meitä varten – Helsinki – Finland, 2020
- Sister Act – Tartu – Estonia, 2020
- Spring Awakening – Gothenburg – Sweden, 2021
- Matilda the Musical – Tampere – Finland, 2021
- Priscilla, Queen of the Desert – Helsinki – Finland, 2022
- Anastasia – Tampere – Finland, 2022
- The Bridges of Madison County – Turku – Finland, 2022
- Come from Away – Tampere – Finland, 2022
- Wicked – Gothenburg – Sweden, 2023
- Annie – Oslo – Norway, 2023
- La Traviata – Tampere – Finland, 2024
- School of Rock – Tampere – Finland, 2024
- Kinky Boots – Tartu, Vanemuine – Estonia, 2024
- Disney's Beauty and the Beast – Copenhagen – Denmark, 2025
- La Traviata – Tartu, Vanemuine – Estonia, 2026

=== Actor ===
- Avenue Q – Nicky (2007)
- High School Musical – Ryan (2008)
- High School Musical 2 – Ryan (2009)
- Spring Awakening – Ernst (2009)
- Les Misérables – Feuilly (2010–2011) & Enjolras (2012)
- Striking 12 – Brandon (2011)
- When the Robbers Came to Cardamom Town – Tommi (2011–2012)
- Legally Blonde – Carlos (2011)
- Next to normal – Henry (2012)
- Jekyll & Hyde – u/s Jekyll & Hyde, ensemble (2013)
- Les Misérables – Enjolras (2013–2014)
- Tanz der Vampire – Herbert (2016)

== Voice over works ==
=== Voice over director ===
- Bridge to Terabithia – Finnish Director (2008)
- SamSam – Finnish Director (2009)
- High School Musical – El Desafio – Finnish Director (2009)
- Cloudy with a Chance of Meatballs – Finnish Director (2009)
- Gnomeo and Juliet – Finnish Director (2011)
- Sharpay's Fabulous Adventure – Finnish Director (2011)
- Cloudy with a Chance of Meatballs 2 – Finnish Director (2013)
- Pete's Dragon – Finnish Director (2016)
- Disney's Beauty and the Beast – Finnish Director (2017)
- Artemis Fowl – Finnish Director (2020)

=== Television animation ===
- Recess – Vince, Butch (1997–2001)
- Kim Possible – Ron Stoppable (2002–2008)
- Teenage Mutant Ninja Turtles (2003) – Leonardo (Seasons 1–2) (2003–2004) (Later replaced by: Markus Blom)
- The Replacements – Donny Rottweiler, Johnny Kunnari (2006–2009)
- Phineas and Ferb – Jeremy Johnson, Buford Van Stomm and Carl (2007–2015)
- Avatar: The Last Airbender – Sokka (2008)
- Lego NinjaGo: Masters of Spinjitzu – Jay (2011–current)

=== Anime ===
- Transformers: Cybertron – Coby, Red Alert
- Transformers: Armada – Rad
- Pokémon – Season 17 Theme Song & Random additional voice dubbing roles
- Digimon Tamers – Ryo Akiyama, Grani (2009)
- Digimon Adventure 02 – Ken Ichijouji (2002)
- Beyblade – Ray
- Battle B-Daman – Enjyu, Joshua, Cain (episodes 19–25)

=== Live action television ===
- LazyTown – Pixeli (Rúnar Freyr Gíslason) (voice)
- Hannah Montana – Jackson Stewart (Jason Earles) (2006)

=== Live action films ===
- Spy Kids 2 – Gary Giggles (Matt O'Leary) (2002)
- The Chronicles of Narnia: The Lion, The Witch and The Wardrobe – Peter Pevensie (William Mosely) (2005)
- High School Musical – Ryan Evans (Lucas Grabeel) (2006)
- High School Musical 2 – Ryan Evans (Lucas Grabeel) (2007)
- Alvin and the Chipmunks – Theodore (Jesse McCartney) (2007) (voice)
- The Chronicles of Narnia: Prince Caspian – Peter Pevensie (William Mosely) (2008)
- Camp Rock – Jason (Kevin Jonas) (2008)
- Hannah Montana: The Movie – Jackson Stewart (Jason Earles) (2009)
- Alvin and the Chipmunks: The Squeakquel – Theodore (Jesse McCartney) (2009) (voice)
- Camp Rock 2 – Jason (Kevin Jonas) (2010)
- Alvin and the Chipmunks: Chipwrecked – Theodore (Jesse McCartney) (2011) (voice)

=== Animated films ===
- Recess: School's Out – Vince (2001)
- Bambi – Young Bambi (1942) (2005 Finnish Re-dub Edition)
- Cars – Snot Rod (2006)
- Surf's Up – Mikey Abromowitz (2007)
- Ratatouille – Linguini (2007)
- The Simpsons Movie – Nelson Muntz, Martin Prince (2007)
- Cloudy with a Chance of Meatballs – Additional voice role (2010)
- Rio – Kipo (2011)
- Happy Feet 2 – Bill (2011)
- The Adventures of Tintin: Secret of the Unicorn – Tintin (2011)
- Rio 2 – Tulio

== Video game roles ==
- Harry Potter and the Philosopher's Stone – Fred Weasley and George Weasley (2001)
- Harry Potter and the Chamber of Secrets – Fred Weasley, George Weasley and Percy Weasley (2002)
- Harry Potter and the Goblet of Fire – Harry Potter (2005)
- Crash of the Titans – Tiny Tiger (2007)
- Crash: Mind over Mutant – Tiny Tiger (2008)
- The Legend of Spyro: A New Beginning – Spyro the Dragon (2006)
- The Legend of Spyro: The Eternal Night – Spyro the Dragon (2007)
- The Legend of Spyro: Dawn of the Dragon – Spyro the Dragon (2008)
