= Harjanne =

Harjanne is a surname. Notable people with the surname include:

- Atte Harjanne (born 1984), Finnish politician
- Samuel Harjanne (born 1987), Finnish actor, voice actor, and singer
- Seppo Harjanne (born 1948), Finnish rally co-driver
