= Quentin Tarantino's Suicide Squad =

- Title-card
- Directed by: Julian Higgins
- Written by: Kevin Brooks; Julian Higgins
- Produced by: Julian Higgins; Jamie Parslow
- Starring: Eric Satterberg; Alex Marshall-Brown; Elliott Branch Jr.; Jennifer Ruckman; Ryan Hellquist; Jefferson Reid; Savira Windyani; Circus-Szalewski; Corey Burton
- Cinematography: Pierce Cook
- Production company: Loot Crate
- Distributed by: Loot Crate
- Release date: July 26, 2016 (YouTube)
- Country: United States
- Language: English

Quentin Tarantino's Suicide Squad is a 2016 parody short fan film directed by Julian Higgins and written by Higgins and Kevin Brooks. It stars Eric Satterberg, Alex Marshall-Brown, Elliott Branch Jr., Jennifer Ruckman and Ryan Hellquist.

== Cast ==
- Eric Satterberg as Quentin
- Alex Marshall-Brown as Amanda Waller
- Elliott Branch Jr. as Jules
- Jennifer Ruckman as The Bride
- Ryan Hellquist as Aldo
- Jefferson Reid as Django
- Savira Windyani as Gogo
- Circus-Szalewski as Col. Hans Landa
- Corey Burton as The Voice

== Production ==
The film is a parody trailer of Suicide Squad. It features characters from Quentin Tarantino's films and was produced and distributed by Loot Crate.

== Reception ==
The Hollywood Reporter said: "It is edited and shot to feel like a mixture of a grindhouse film mixed with Suicide Squad through the blender of Tarantino's vision." IndieWire said: "There's as much blood and bodies in the teaser as in any sequence from one of Tarantino's movies, plus riffs on several of the unforgettable Tarantino one-liners." Boy Genius Report compared it to Inglourious Basterds. Esquire said that Tarantino's version would be better than DC's.
