= Closet Cases of the Nerd Kind =

- Directed by: Rick Harper
- Written by: Rick Harper; Bob Rogers
- Produced by: Rick Harper; Bob Rogers
- Starring: Stan Greiwe; Corey Burton; Sandy Stotzer; Hennan Chambers
- Edited by: Marshall Harvey
- Music by: Larry Wright
- Distributed by: Pyramid Films
- Release date: 1980
- Running time: 12 min
- Language: English

Closet Cases of the Nerd Kind (1980) is a short film spoof of the classic science fiction film Close Encounters of the Third Kind. The film was written and produced by Rick Harper and Bob Rogers.

== Plot ==
In the film, sewage worker Roy Dreary and a number of unusual characters meet up with strange extraterrestrials traveling to earth in a giant pie in the sky. Dreary develops an obsession with mashed potatoes, whipped cream, and maraschino cherries. He encounters singing mailboxes, truck radios that spout bubbles and bubble music, and one pie in the face after another, before finally finding himself at the Sara Loo pie factory-and his close encounter of the nerd kind.

Other characters include a wide-eyed cherubic child, a famous French scientist, a bewildered wife, plus Darth Vader on a motorcycle complaining that Dreary is blocking the road. The film also includes a mysterious code (which turns out to be the first nine digits of the mathematical constant pi) and an oversized xylophone on which Dreary signals to the aliens. All of the character voices are over-dubbed by voice artists Corey Burton (in his first film role) and Sandy Stotzer.
