= Dudley Do-Right (film) =

1999 film by Hugh Wilson

- Theatrical release poster
- Directed by: Hugh Wilson
- Written by: Hugh Wilson
- Based on: Characters & The Dudley Do-Right Show (Dudley Do-Right and Friends) by Jay Ward
- Produced by: John Davis; J. Todd Harris; Joseph M. Singer
- Starring: Brendan Fraser; Sarah Jessica Parker; Alfred Molina; Eric Idle; Robert Prosky; Alex Rocco
- Cinematography: Donald E. Thorin
- Edited by: Don Brochu
- Music by: Steve Dorff
- Production companies: Davis Entertainment; Jay Ward Productions; Joseph M. Singer Entertainment
- Distributed by: Universal Pictures
- Release date: August 27, 1999
- Running time: 77 minutes
- Country: United States
- Language: English
- Budget: $22 million
- Box office: $10 million

Dudley Do-Right is a 1999 American slapstick comedy film written and directed by Hugh Wilson, based on Jay Ward's Dudley Do-Right, produced by Davis Entertainment for Universal Studios. The film stars Brendan Fraser as the cartoon's titular Mountie with supporting roles from Sarah Jessica Parker, Alfred Molina, and Eric Idle. It was released on August 27, 1999. The film was a critical and commercial failure.

== Plot ==
The young versions of Dudley Do-Right, Nell Fenwick, and Snidely Whiplash gather at a lake with Dudley's pet horse "Horse", where they talk of their aspirations. Dudley believes he is destined to be a Royal Canadian Mounted Police officer (Mountie), and Nell wishes to see the world, while Snidely wishes to be a villain.

Years later, all three have fulfilled their supposed destinies. Dudley is now a Mountie upholding the law in Semi-Happy Valley, but always adheres to the rules and is frequently oblivious to even the most obvious of things; and Snidely has become an infamous bank robber. After Snidely and his gang rob a bank of its money and gold, Snidely tricks his entire gang into believing he has fled with all the gold to the Sudan and pursuing him. Snidely subsequently salts local lakes with the stolen gold. Dudley catches him in the act, but Snidely fools him into thinking he is vampire hunting, and uses a similar tactic to scare away Horse. Nell returns from her world tour and reunites with Dudley, and the two spend the night attending a festival at a settlement belonging to the nearby Kumquat tribe.

Meanwhile, Prospector Kim J. Darling, the poorest man in Semi-Happy Valley, stumbles across the gold in the river and is made into a media sensation by Snidely. The subsequent gold rush boosts Snidely's popularity, and after foreclosing many local mortgages, he quickly takes control of the town, renaming it "Whiplash City". Eventually, Snidely's men return from the Sudan to kill him for his deceit, but Snidely convinces them otherwise by offering them lives of luxury in his new town. A suspicious Dudley confronts Snidely, who laughs him off and snatches Nell from him. Snidely sends his second-in-command, Homer, to assassinate Dudley with a bomb, but Dudley is absent when the bomb explodes. Nell's father Inspector Fenwick, who is in good favor with Snidely, discovers Dudley's feud with Snidely and discharges Dudley from the Mounties. Dudley falls into a depression and wanders across the town until he runs into a drunken Kim, who offers him shelter at his cave in the woods. Darling tells Dudley of Snidely's plans and newfound popularity and takes him to see a Gala Ball in Snidely's honor. Despite Kim's warning not to challenge Snidely due to his loss of favor, Dudley unsuccessfully attempts to take Nell back from Snidely.

Feeling sympathy for Dudley, Kim subjects him to a harsh training regimen to make him a more formidable opponent and take back Semi-Valley from Snidely. Dudley's first act is to intimidate one of Snidely's men into telling him the next gold shipment. Disguised as a motorbike-driving vigilante, Dudley sabotages the shipment and leaves his mark on Snidely's workshop as well as his favorite golf course. Snidely, unaware that Dudley lost his job, is offended by this and more so with his men's incompetence to stop him, believing Dudley is enjoying the perks of being the villain. At the end of training, Kim leaves to find his family and thanks Dudley for his friendship. Dudley then uses his new training to win Nell back from Snidely, who swears revenge. At a nighttime town meeting, Snidely attempts to rally the people against Dudley, but it falls on deaf ears. The populace has grown weary of Snidely and more respectful of Dudley in his efforts to retake their town.

Snidely ultimately discovers that Dudley and Nell are at another festival with the Kumquat tribe and leads a full-scale attack on them. The Kumquats flee for their lives until Horse reappears and helps Dudley sabotage Snidely's tanks by making Snidely and Homer accidentally shoot and incapacitate each other. A cavalry of Mounties appears and arrests Snidely and his men. Kim also arrives with his wife, the Prime Minister of Canada, and is reunited with Dudley, revealing that they called out the cavalry. Inspector Fenwick reinstates Dudley in the Mounties, and Dudley and Nell settle down in Dudley's rebuilt house, sharing a kiss.

== Cast ==
- Brendan Fraser as Dudley Do-Right, a somewhat dim but conscientious officer of the Royal Canadian Mounted Police
  - Dyllan Christopher as Young Dudley
- Sarah Jessica Parker as Nell Fenwick, Dudley's love interest and Inspector Fenwick's daughter
  - Ashley Yarman as young Nell
- Alfred Molina as Snidely Whiplash, a sinister bank robber and Dudley's arch rival
  - Jeremy Bergman as Young Snidely
- Eric Idle as Kim J. Darling
- Robert Prosky as Inspector Fenwick
- Alex Rocco as Kumquat Chief
- Jack Kehler as Homer, Snidely's feeble minded second in command (Note: Kehler is erroneously listed in the end credits as Howard)
- Jed Rees as Lavar, one of Snidely's henchmen
- C. Ernst Harth as Shane, one of Snidely's henchmen
- Regis Philbin as himself
- Kathie Lee Gifford as herself
- Michael Chambers as dancer
- Anne Fletcher as dancer
- Don Yesso as Kenneth
- Jessica Schreier as Mrs. Darling
- Louis Mustillo as standing room only
- Kevin Blatch as Townsperson
- Ernie Grunwald as Customs Officer
- Gerard Plunkett as Spin Worthy
- Michal Suchánek as Ten-year-old Boy
- Brent Butt as a bad guy in black
- David Fredericks as yet another bad guy
- Kevin Mundy as Mr. Darling
- Adrian Armas as dancer
- Scott Fowler as dancer
- Amber Funk as dancer
- Lisa Ratzin as dancer
- Artine Tony Browne as bad guy
- Robin Mossley as in the way back
- Gerald Scarr as death row guard
- Corey Burton as the voice of the announcer

== Production ==
Hugh Wilson was signed to write and direct the film in July 1997 for a fee of $5 million.

The film was shot on-site in Quebec, Canada's Montreal and Quebec City. Additional filming scenes were in Santa Clarita, California in fall 1998.

Dudley Do-Right was Fraser's second film based on a Jay Ward cartoon, 1997's George of the Jungle being the first. Despite the different studios producing each film (George of the Jungle was adapted by Walt Disney Pictures), advertising for the Dudley Do-Right film made open reference to this coincidence: "From the creator of George of the Jungle…and the star of George of the Jungle…and the acclaimed director who saw George of the Jungle…"

== Reception ==
=== Box office ===
The film underperformed at the box-office; grossing $3,018,345 in its opening weekend - ranking eleventh for the weekend - and went on to gross just $9,974,410 domestically against a budget of $22 million.

In theaters, the film had a theatrical short attached to it, The Phox, The Box, and The Lox, an animated short produced by Universal Cartoon Studios based on the Jay Ward series Fractured Fairy Tales, marking the first short based on a Jay Ward property since 1967.

=== Critical response ===
On the review aggregator website Rotten Tomatoes, 16% of 45 critics' reviews are positive, with an average rating of 4/10. The website's consensus reads: "Gags aren't that funny." Metacritic, which uses a weighted average, assigned the film a score of 44 out of 100, based on 23 critics, indicating "mixed or average" reviews. Audiences surveyed by CinemaScore gave the film a grade "C+" on scale of A to F.

Kenneth Turan of the Los Angeles Times, said that it "disappoints in every way possible, forcing its failed tongue-in-cheek humor and proving one more time that not all successful cartoons cry out for live-action treatment". In a positive review from The New York Times' Janet Maslin, said that the film "attempts to be both zany entertainment for children and nostalgic fun for those who grew up on this and other deft, snarky Ward creations. (Rocky, Bullwinkle and George of the Jungle are other well-loved Ward characters.) And it works pretty well, too. Beyond the sure-fire goofy presence of Brendan Fraser and the comic possibilities of a Canadian mountie who rides his horse backward, this jokey romp written and directed by Hugh Wilson has an appealing try-anything spirit. It's a movie that can start with Mr. Fraser buttoned into his stiff red uniform and have him dancing shirtless in a Las Vegas-style Indian act before its story is over".

Chicago Sun-Times critic Roger Ebert gave the film a two and a half stars out of four, writing: "Dudley Do-Right is a genial live-action version of the old cartoon, with a lot of broad slapstick humor that kids like and adults wince at. I did a little wincing the ninth or tenth time Dudley stepped on a loose plank and it slammed him in the head, but I enjoyed the film more than I expected to. It's harmless, simple-minded, and has a couple of sequences better than Dudley really deserves".

== Home media ==
Dudley Do-Right was released on VHS and DVD on December 28, 1999, and on Blu-ray on October 8, 2019.
