= Snidely Whiplash =

Character from Dudley Do-Right of the Mounties

- The Adventures of Rocky and Bullwinkle and Friends character
- First appearance: The Comic Strips of Television (1948)
- Created by: Jay Ward
- Portrayed by: Alfred Molina
- Voiced by: Hans Conried (1959-1982); Corey Burton (1983–present)

In-universe information
- Nationality: Canadian

Snidely Whiplash is a fictional character who originally appeared as the main antagonist in the Dudley Do-Right of the Mounties segments of the animated television series The Rocky and Bullwinkle Show. He is the archenemy of Dudley Do-Right. He was listed among the 100 greatest characters in television animation.

The segment of The Comic Strips of Television in which Snidely (named Sydney "The Snake" Snodgrass) first appears.

== Actors ==
The character was voiced by Hans Conried in the original cartoon series. Alfred Molina played Whiplash in the 1999 live-action film version Dudley Do-Right.

== Character and habits ==
Whiplash is the stereotypical villain in the style of stock characters found in silent films and earlier stage melodrama, wearing black clothing and a top hat and with a handlebar moustache. Whiplash's henchman, Homer, usually wears a tuque.

In the cartoon's opening segments, Whiplash is seen tying Nell Fenwick to a railroad track. Whiplash is obsessed with tying young women to railroad tracks; he has no reason to do so and realizes no gain, profit or advantage, but is simply compelled to do it.

He is the antithesis of Do-Right, who is the archetype of goodness and a Royal Canadian Mounted Policeman (RCMP). On one occasion, typical of producer Jay Ward's sense of humor, Whiplash and Do-Right changed hats; Do-Right became the criminal supervillain who actually succeeds at crime and Whiplash became the RCMP hero for capturing the evil Do-Right. This role reversal is repeated in the 1999 film adaptation.
