= The Legend of Spyro: A New Beginning =

2006 video game

- Developers: Krome Studios (console, GBA); Big Ant Studios (GBA); Amaze Entertainment (DS); The Mighty Troglodytes (Mobile)
- Publisher: Vivendi Universal Games (Note: Released under the Sierra Entertainment brand name)
- Director: Steve Stamatiadis
- Producers: Chris A. Wilson; John Welsh
- Designer: Cameron Davis (console)
- Programmers: Steve Williams (console); David Theodore (GBA); Michael Baird (DS)
- Artists: Bruno Rime (console); Andrew Gillard (GBA); Lance Myers (DS)
- Writer: Patrick Hegarty
- Composers: Rebecca Kneubuhl; Gabriel Mann; Noel Gabriel (DS); Mark Yeend (DS)
- Series: Spyro; The Legend of Spyro
- Engine: Merkury
- Platforms: Game Boy Advance, GameCube, PlayStation 2, Xbox, Nintendo DS, Mobile
- Release: NA: October 10, 2006; EU: October 27, 2006; AU: November 2, 2006
- Genre: Action-adventure
- Mode: Single-player

The Legend of Spyro: A New Beginning is a 2006 action-adventure video game in the Spyro series. It is the first installment in The Legend of Spyro trilogy. The game was released for the Game Boy Advance, Nintendo DS, GameCube, PlayStation 2, Xbox, and mobile. It features the voice talents of Elijah Wood as Spyro, Gary Oldman as Ignitus, David Spade as Sparx, and Cree Summer as Cynder.

A New Beginning received mixed reviews overall, being praised for its story and presentation, but was criticized for its repetitive gameplay and the lack of attack variety in Spyro's moveset. The GBA version received generally negative reviews for its visuals, short length and repetitive combat. The game was followed by The Legend of Spyro: The Eternal Night in 2007.

== Gameplay ==
An in-game screenshot for A New Beginning. Spyro is seen fighting an ape soldier with an electricity move.

A New Beginning uses a more action-based focus than previous Spyro games. Rather than the previous focus on platforming, the gameplay is now more combat-based. Spyro has a variety of combat moves as well as four different breath attacks: fire, electricity, ice, and earth, which he can use as both long range and short range attacks. Spyro can also use furies, huge blasts of elemental energy. The game has fewer levels than previous Spyro games, with six levels that progress from a starting point towards a final destination and boss encounter in a linear fashion, and two rail shooter style flying levels adjoining them. It takes about six hours to complete the game.

The DS version has additional attacks and challenges. As well as breath attacks and furies, Spyro can create an elemental shield around himself that protects him from enemies while hurting attacking enemies. Also, the DS version has extra side missions in the form of puzzles, and also supports the Rumble Pak for force feedback.

== Plot ==
The game begins inside a temple, where an enormous red dragon named Ignitus is watching over an egg during the "Year of the Dragon". A dragon's prophecy tells that a rare purple dragon will be born every ten generations, which will direct that era's fate; Ignitus is looking after such an egg.

The dragons are, however, at war with an enemy known as the "Dark Master," who also knows of the prophecy, and lays siege to the temple, intent on destroying the brood of eggs. Ignitus escapes with the purple dragon's egg, leaving it to drift downriver into a swamp, hoping for the best. A family of dragonflies discovers the egg, and upon hatching, they name the dragon Spyro, adopt him into the family, and raise him as one of their own alongside Sparx, a dragonfly born the same day.

Years later, after coming under attack by strange foes one day and discovering that he can breathe fire, Spyro is told that he is not a dragonfly himself but a stranger from a distant land; Spyro decides to leave the swamp in search of his true home and Sparx, though reluctant at first, decides to follow along. Hostile forces pursue Spyro, but he eventually meets a distraught Ignitus, who, although pleased that Spyro is alive, fears that with the Dragon Temple under occupation by their enemy, led by a black female dragon named Cynder, their war is already lost.

Spyro convinces Ignitus to lead him to the Temple and can drive Cynder's forces out, after which Ignitus tells Spyro more about their war against the dark armies, offers Spyro some training in the art of the fire element, and then sends Spyro off to rescue three other dragons from Cynder's forces. One by one, Spyro clashes with Cynder's armies and saves the three other dragons, Volteer, Cyril, and Terrador, while gaining powers over electricity, ice, and earth, as well as acquiring new skills and training along the way. He also runs into new friends, such as Kane and the Atlawas on Tall Plains, and Mole-Yair, Exhumor, and the Manweersmalls on Munitions Forge, respectively. It is discovered that Cynder has been draining the dragons' power into crystals.

Cynder, however, starts fighting Spyro after the latter rescued Terrador; Ignitus intervenes to fight Cynder, but is captured. It is revealed that the four dragons originally sealed away the Dark Master and that Cynder is using their drained powers to open the seal. Ignitus's power is the final key to unsealing the Dark Master, so Spyro is sent on a final, direct assault against Cynder's fortress.

Spyro attempts to fight Cynder, but she succeeds in draining Ignitus's power of fire into a crystal and escapes to the sealed realm of the Dark Master. During the fight, Spyro noticed something familiar in Cynder's eyes. Ignitus then tells Spyro the rest of the story of what happened the night of the attack on the temple. After sending Spyro's egg down the river, Ignitus returned to see that the Dark Master's forces had destroyed the brood of eggs, except one - for only a dragon born in the Year of the Dragon can open the portal and release the Dark Master: Cynder, who had been stolen and was cursed by the Dark Master's sinister powers. Ignitus fears that it is too late to stop her. Still, Spyro pursues Cynder and forces a showdown, eventually using all of his power in a final attack that defeats her, purging her of the Dark Master's control and returning her to her true form, a young female dragon the same size and age as Spyro. The realm begins to collapse in on itself; Sparx insists on making a quick exit, but Spyro declares he will not leave Cynder behind with the Dark Master because he had cursed her and she was not acting on her own choice. Spyro is barely able to grab Cynder and escape safely.

Though victorious, the battle cost Spyro much of his strength and powers, and both Spyro and Cynder suspect that the Dark Master is still alive somewhere; the war is still far from over. The story continues in The Legend of Spyro: The Eternal Night.

== Development ==
Krome Studios were asked by Vivendi Games to develop The Legend of Spyro. After Krome showed Vivendi their technology they were using to develop a Crash Bandicoot game, Sierra asked a prototype for what subsequently became The Legend of Spyro.

In contrast to past titles in the series, there were several noteworthy voice actors included in the game; Those being Elijah Wood as the voice of Spyro, comedian David Spade as Sparx, Cree Summer as Cynder and Gary Oldman as Ignitus.

== Reception ==
Reception

Aggregate score
Aggregator	Score					
Aggregator	DS	GBA	GameCube	mobile	PS2	Xbox
Metacritic	68/100	44/100	67/100	N/A	64/100	69/100

Review scores
Publication	Score					
Publication	DS	GBA	GameCube	mobile	PS2	Xbox
Eurogamer	N/A	N/A	N/A	N/A	6/10	N/A
Game Informer	N/A	N/A	7/10	N/A	7/10	7/10
GameSpot	7/10	3.9/10	5.8/10	N/A	5.8/10	5.8/10
GameSpy	N/A	N/A	2.5/5	N/A	2.5/5	2.5/5
GameZone	7.3/10	5/10	6/10	N/A	6.2/10	5.5/10
IGN	7.1/10	4.5/10	7.7/10	7.3/10	7.7/10	7.7/10
NGamer	70%	N/A	66%	N/A	N/A	N/A
Nintendo Power	N/A	N/A	5.5/10	N/A	N/A	N/A
Official U.S. PlayStation Magazine	N/A	N/A	N/A	N/A	5/10	N/A
Official Xbox Magazine (US)	N/A	N/A	N/A	N/A	N/A	6.5/10
Pocket Gamer	3.5/5	N/A	N/A	3.5/5	N/A	N/A
The Sydney Morning Herald	N/A	N/A	3/5	N/A	3/5	3/5

The game received "mixed or average" reviews on all platforms except the Game Boy Advance version, which received "generally unfavorable" reviews, according to the review aggregation website Metacritic.

IGN stated, "The franchise has gotten a serious lift in nearly every area. The overall gameplay was extremely solid for a children's title, the overall presentation was baffling complex – with everything from scripted story events and innovative enemy entrances – and the overall audio/graphical design is definitely stronger than we expected." Eurogamer stated, "If you loved the original games then that might carry you through to completion but for those who are new, prepare for a long slog."

Despite the mixed reception, the Academy of Interactive Arts & Sciences nominated The Legend of Spyro for "Children's Game of the Year" at the 10th Annual Interactive Achievement Awards.

== Sequel ==
Its success spawned two sequels, The Legend of Spyro: The Eternal Night and The Legend of Spyro: Dawn of the Dragon. A CGI movie adaptation was rumored to be in the works ahead of its release, which never came to fruition; the script was leaked in 2022.
