= The Legend of Spyro: The Eternal Night =

2007 video game

- Developers: Krome Studios (console); Amaze Entertainment (portable); The Mighty Troglodytes (Mobile)
- Publishers: Vivendi Games (Note: Released under the Sierra Entertainment brand.); Vivendi Games Mobile (Mobile)
- Directors: Chris A. Wilson; Steve Stamatiadis (console)
- Producers: Don Meadows (Console); Weston Giunta (DS)
- Designers: Russell Andes (GBA); Patrick Moran (DS)
- Programmers: Chris Lacy (console); Mike Dorgan (GBA); Jeff Bloom (DS)
- Artists: Jared Pullen (Console); Kris Durrschmidt (GBA); Lance Myers (DS)
- Writers: Michael Graham (console); Patrick Hegarty; Patrick Smith (DS)
- Composers: Gabriel Mann, Rebecca Kneubuhl (console); Tom Miller (portable)
- Series: Spyro; The Legend of Spyro
- Platforms: Nintendo DS, Game Boy Advance, Mobile, PlayStation 2, Wii
- Release: Game Boy Advance, Nintendo DS & PlayStation 2: NA: October 2, 2007; AU: November 1, 2007; EU: November 2, 2007; Wii: NA: October 18, 2007; AU: December 6, 2007; EU: December 14, 2007; Mobile: EU: November 2007
- Genre: Action-adventure
- Mode: Single-player

The Legend of Spyro: The Eternal Night is a 2007 action-adventure game developed by Krome Studios and published by Vivendi Games for the PlayStation 2 and Wii, while other games developed by different studios bearing the same title were released for the Game Boy Advance, Nintendo DS, and cellular phones. It is the second installment in The Legend of Spyro trilogy, a reboot of the Spyro series with elements of high fantasy. Following the events of The Legend of Spyro: A New Beginning (2006), the game follows Spyro as he attempts to stop the resurrection of the dragon known as Dark Master before a lunar alignment called the Night of Eternal Darkness occurs. Similarly to A New Beginning, the gameplay is based around linear levels where the player must attack hordes of enemies before fighting a boss. The game has higher emphasis on puzzle-solving and exploration compared to its predecessor and gameplay mechanics are introduced to change up combat encounters.

Upon release, The Eternal Night received mixed critical reception. The third and final entry in The Legend of Spyro trilogy, Dawn of the Dragon, was released in 2008.

== Gameplay ==
A screenshot from the game.

The gameplay is similar to its predecessor. Spyro must travel to the end of a level in a linear fashion and defeat the boss at the end of each level, defeating enemies with his combat moves. However, there is a much larger emphasis on exploration and puzzle-solving.

Spyro will learn different breaths from the Chronicler, who is met in dreams which occur to Spyro during the course of the game. The breaths are tools for defeating enemies. They come in different elements; fire, ice, electricity and earth. Spyro can also use furies, which are big blasts of elemental magic. Spyro is required to obtain a certain amount of purple gems to be able to use these skills.

Spyro is able to learn the skill of "dragon time" from the Chronicler. This skill allows Spyro to slow down time. He can use this ability to jump on platforms which are too fast to land on with his normal speed. He can also use this ability to defeat enemies more easily.

Throughout the levels there are forty quills. Each quill collected gives the player 5 pieces of concept art.

== Synopsis ==
=== Setting ===
The Eternal Night continues the storyline established by A New Beginning, which ended with the defeat of Cynder, a black dragon in servitude for an enemy called the "Dark Master." In The Eternal Night, a new antagonist — "Gaul" the Ape King — has risen to power and intends to resurrect the Dark Master on The Night of Eternal Darkness.

=== Plot ===
The story continues with Spyro following Cynder through the swamp surrounding the Dragon Temple. Spyro catches up with her and asks her not to leave. Cynder says she's sorry for what she had done in the previous game and wishes to find out where she belongs in the world, currently believing that she does not belong at the temple. She runs off, leaving Sparx and Spyro alone. Soon after she is gone, the Temple is attacked by the apes. After Spyro repels the attack, Ignitus, the leader of the dragons and master of fire, sends Spyro to seek out a tree that Spyro saw in a vision (in the dreams to follow, he gets his powers back, as he lost them at the end in A New Beginning). At the same time, Ignitus looks for help against the Apes. As Spyro searches for the tree, he also searches for another dragon, the Chronicler, who asks Spyro in the same vision to find him. When he finds the tree (in the Game Boy Advance version, he falls into a cave), it suddenly turns into a tree monster known as Arborick (the Game Boy Advance version calls the monster Naga) and attacks Spyro. Still, although Arborick was killed, Spyro is captured by pirates and taken on board their ship to participate in gladiatorial combat.

After Spyro defeats a third enemy in the arena, he is made to fight Cynder, whom the pirates also captured. Before they can think of a plan to escape together, the pirate ship is suddenly attacked by the apes, who capture Cynder. After Spyro escapes the ship and defeats the pirate captain, Skabb, he discovers that the Apes have established a base on the Mountain of Malefor, also known as the Well Of Souls, in an effort to revive the Dark Master using a lunar alignment called the Night of Eternal Darkness. He also discovers they are keeping Cynder prisoner, hoping to turn her to their side again.

Spyro eventually finds the Chronicler, who tells him about the Dark Master. According to him, the Dark Master was the first purple dragon; his raw power allowed him to master practically every elemental power. When his growth failed to stop, he was exiled and sealed away by the dragon elders, but not before he taught the Apes how to use dragon magic. The Chronicler wants Spyro to hide from the Dark Master until a later time, but Spyro insists on going to Cynder's aid.

When he gets to the mountain, Gaul, the Ape King, orders Cynder to attack Spyro. When she attacks Gaul instead, he knocks her out and challenges Spyro himself. During the fight, the lunar alignment occurs, and the evil energy it generates is channeled through Spyro, which turns him into his dark self. He uses his immense power to turn Gaul to stone, blasts his body apart, then leaps back into the beam of evil energy. Cynder awakens and knocks Spyro out of the beam, freeing him from the beam's power. When the alignment passes, the mountain starts crumbling around Spyro, Sparx, and Cynder. Remembering the Chronicler's words about riding out the storm, Spyro uses his powers to encase himself, Cynder, and Sparx in crystal to protect them as the Well of Souls collapses. After the credits, the trio is shown in the crystal while someone is watching as the Chronicler says that when Spyro awakens, the world will be different, but also assures him that he is not alone; he has allies. The story concludes in the third and final game, Dawn of the Dragon.

== Reception ==
Reception

Aggregate score
Aggregator	Score				
Aggregator	DS	GBA	mobile	PS2	Wii
Metacritic	56/100	80/100	N/A	54/100	60/100

Review scores
Publication	Score				
Publication	DS	GBA	mobile	PS2	Wii
Eurogamer	N/A	N/A	N/A	4/10	N/A
Game Informer	N/A	N/A	N/A	6.25/10	6.25/10
GameDaily	N/A	N/A	N/A	6/10	N/A
GameRevolution	N/A	N/A	N/A	D+	N/A
GameSpot	N/A	N/A	N/A	5/10	5/10
GameZone	6.5/10	8.6/10	N/A	N/A	6.7/10
IGN	5.5/10	N/A	7/10	3.5/10	3.6/10
Nintendo World Report	N/A	7.5/10	N/A	N/A	N/A
Official Nintendo Magazine	N/A	N/A	N/A	N/A	76%
PlayStation Official Magazine – UK	N/A	N/A	N/A	6/10	N/A
Pocket Gamer	3/5	N/A	3/5	N/A	N/A

The game received "mixed" reviews on all platforms except the Game Boy Advance version, which received "favorable" reviews, according to the review aggregation website Metacritic.
