= The Legend of Spyro: Dawn of the Dragon =

2008 video game

- Developers: Étranges Libellules (console); Tantalus Media (DS); The Mighty Troglodytes (Mobile)
- Publishers: NA: Activision; PAL: Vivendi Games (Note: Released under the Sierra Entertainment brand.); Vivendi Games Mobile (Mobile)
- Series: Spyro; The Legend of Spyro
- Platforms: Mobile; Nintendo DS; PlayStation 2; PlayStation 3; Wii; Xbox 360
- Release: Mobile: EU: 24 September 2008; DS, PlayStation 2, PlayStation 3, Wii, Xbox 360: NA: 21 October 2008; AU: 5 November 2008; EU: 21 November 2008; AU: 21 November 2008 (DS)
- Genre: Action-adventure
- Modes: Single-player, multiplayer

The Legend of Spyro: Dawn of the Dragon (French: La Légende de Spyro: Naissance d'un dragon) is a 2008 action-adventure video game in the Spyro series. It is the third and final installment in The Legend of Spyro trilogy and the sequel to The Legend of Spyro: The Eternal Night (2007), marking the tenth anniversary of the game series. The game was released for the PlayStation 2, PlayStation 3, Xbox 360, Wii, and mobile.

Elijah Wood and Gary Oldman reprise their roles as Spyro and Ignitus, respectively, while Wayne Brady replaces Billy West as Sparx and Christina Ricci replaces Mae Whitman as Cynder from the previous game. It also features the voice talents of Blair Underwood as Hunter the Cheetah and Mark Hamill as Malefor, the Dark Master.

It is the end of The Legend of Spyro continuity, with Skylanders: Spyro's Adventure (2011) serving as the second reboot of the franchise after Vivendi Games merged with video game publisher Activision to form the Activision Blizzard holding company on July 10, 2008.

== Gameplay ==
A screenshot from the game.

This is the first Spyro game that allows a player to fly at any time they want, with free-fly mode. The game also features a co-op mode with Cynder. The co-op feature allows players the option of completing the game as either Spyro or Cynder, along with the ability to switch between the two dragons. In previous Legend of Spyro titles, Spyro must travel through the level and defeat enemies in a linear fashion. However, this time players will explore larger areas and collect items in order to progress through the game.

Spyro retains his command of fire, electricity, ice and earth (all of which he now has access to from the start), while Cynder controls poison, fear, wind and shadow - all powers that were granted to her when she was controlled by the Dark Master. Spyro is stronger but has slower movement, while Cynder is weaker, with faster movement.

Along with the standard power-ups that gems can grant, Spyro and Cynder can both equip pieces of Dragon Armor that they can find. They also have another feature called melee combos - the more times the player hits the enemy, the more Gems the players will earn. Blue Gems will power up Spyro and Cynder, allowing them to upgrade moves. In addition, there are also red Gems, which restore lost health. The green gems will give the dragons their magic, allowing them usage of their elemental attacks.

The Fury Gems from previous titles have been replaced by dark crystals, which can drain magic if they're not destroyed. The Fury Meter now increases depending on the number of times Spyro or Cynder land attacks on enemies.

In addition to standard enemies, there are also elite enemies - which are stronger than standard ones. Their masks grant them invincibility to normal attacks. The player must use an element of a designated color (that which matches that of the enemy's mask) in order to knock the mask off. Once kicked off, normal attacks and other elemental powers can be used.

== Plot ==
The game's story continues three years after the events of the previous game. Spyro and Cynder, now teenagers, are broken free of their crystalline prison by mysterious enemies known as Grublins. The two are tethered together with green energy chains created by the Dark Master before being carried away, while Sparx is found by Hunter of Avalar, who was watching them from the shadows. Meanwhile, Spyro and Cynder find themselves in a dark, volcano-like area. When they try to leave, they find out they can't as they are chained to the platform they awoke on. After defeating several waves of Grublins and avoiding an earth Golem that attacks them soon after, Spyro and Cynder manage to escape the Catacombs with the help of Hunter, who is with Sparx. After reaching safety in Twilight Falls, Hunter reveals to Spyro, Cynder, and Sparx that the Dark Master, Malefor, had returned to the realm shortly after they disappeared and has covered the land in darkness ever since.

Once they reach the Dragon City of Warfang, Spyro, Cynder and Hunter are separated as the city is under siege by Malefor's forces. After a long and fierce battle that ends in the siege driven back, the Golem returns and uses parts of the city to create an arm to replace the one it lost in the Catacombs. Spyro and Cynder defeat the Golem by destroying the Dark Crystal in its head, allowing Spyro, Cynder, and the Dragon Guardians to finally reunite. The victory is short-lived, as later that night, Malefor sends the citizens of Warfang a message: he has revived the Destroyer, an ancient creature whose purpose is to renew the world by bringing about its destruction. As they will be unable to catch up with the beast if they fly after it, the Fire Dragon Guardian Ignitus (the leader of the Dragon Guardians) hatches a plan to wait for it to circle back and attack before it can complete its circle. Passing underground is the only way to intercept it in time. Cynder and Spyro are able to open the gates to the underground Ruins of Warfang, which leads the attack forces to the canyon where the Destroyer will complete the Ring of Annihilation by destroying a nearby dam. They stall the Destroyer long enough to destroy its Dark Crystal heart. Despite this, the Destroyer manages to complete the Belt of Fire, and Ignitus orders everyone underground as he escorts Spyro and Cynder through the Belt of Fire. To get them to the Burned Lands, which will lead them to Malefor's lair, Ignitus sacrifices himself in the crossing. Overcome with grief, Spyro turns into his dark form and tries to go back and save him (which also threatens to harm Cynder with levitating rocks) but is stopped and comforted by Cynder. Cynder tells Spyro he's not alone and encourages him to continue the journey, as Ignitus wanted them to.

After getting through the Burned Lands and the Floating Islands, Spyro and Cynder arrive at Malefor's lair and confront him. Malefor taunts Spyro by telling him that the destiny of all purple dragons is to bring about the world's destruction, which Spyro denies. During the confrontation, the evil dragon gets rid of the green chain that tethered Spyro and Cynder together throughout their trials, then corrupts Cynder back to his cause; Cynder attacks Spyro, only to break free from Malefor's control when Spyro refuses to fight, stating that Cynder has left him nothing to fight for. Angered by this turn of events, Malefor binds Spyro and Cynder together once again to kill them both before beginning their airborne battle. As Spyro and Cynder fly after Malefor, the Destroyer completes its circle, marking the world's end. The three dragons fall into the volcano The Destroyer had entered, and after fighting with Malefor, Spyro and Cynder plummet into the center of the Earth as they continue their battle. Malefor proclaims that he is eternal, unable to be defeated, but is then sealed away in the world's core by the spirits of the ancestors, and the green chain disappears soon after.

Despite Malefor's defeat, the world is still falling apart, as Spyro and Cynder wonder if this is indeed the end. Ignitus' spirit returns and gives Spyro hope. With the chain that bound them together broken with Malefor's defeat, Spyro tells Cynder to flee while he stops the catastrophe, but she refuses to leave him. As Spyro prepares to unleash a powerful Fury wave, Cynder verbally reveals that she loves him. Spyro's magic rebuilds the world, and the remaining Dragon Guardians, Hunter, Sparx, and the survivors emerge from underground into the setting sun as stars in the sky form into the figure of a dragon.

After the credits, the Chronicler speaks to someone that a new age is beginning, and with each new age, a worthy dragon is chosen to record the triumphs and failures of that era. His time is over, but the time of the new chronicler, Ignitus, has just begun. Before passing his mantle, the Chronicler informs Ignitus that though he has tried his best, he cannot find "any trace of Spyro" in the book that details dragons who have died. As Ignitus becomes the new Chronicler, he wonders where Spyro could be. Meanwhile, as the game closes, a glimpse of Spyro and Cynder can be seen flying together over the Valley of Avalar.

== Reception ==
Reception

Aggregate score
Aggregator	Score					
Aggregator	DS	mobile	PS2	PS3	Wii	Xbox 360
Metacritic	57/100	N/A	60/100	59/100	64/100	62/100

Review scores
Publication	Score					
Publication	DS	mobile	PS2	PS3	Wii	Xbox 360
1Up.com	N/A	N/A	N/A	D+	N/A	D+
Eurogamer	N/A	N/A	N/A	N/A	N/A	5/10
Game Informer	N/A	N/A	N/A	4/10	4/10	4/10
GameSpot	N/A	N/A	N/A	5/10	5/10	5/10
GameZone	7/10	N/A	N/A	5.4/10	6/10	8.5/10
IGN	6.2/10	N/A	7/10	7.3/10	7/10	7.3/10
Nintendo World Report	5/10	N/A	N/A	N/A	5/10	N/A
Official Nintendo Magazine	41%	N/A	N/A	N/A	N/A	N/A
PlayStation Official Magazine – UK	N/A	N/A	N/A	6/10	N/A	N/A
Official Xbox Magazine (US)	N/A	N/A	N/A	N/A	N/A	4.5/10
Pocket Gamer	3/5	2.5/5	N/A	N/A	N/A	N/A

The game received "mixed" reviews on all platforms according to the review aggregation website Metacritic.
