= Frank Welker filmography =

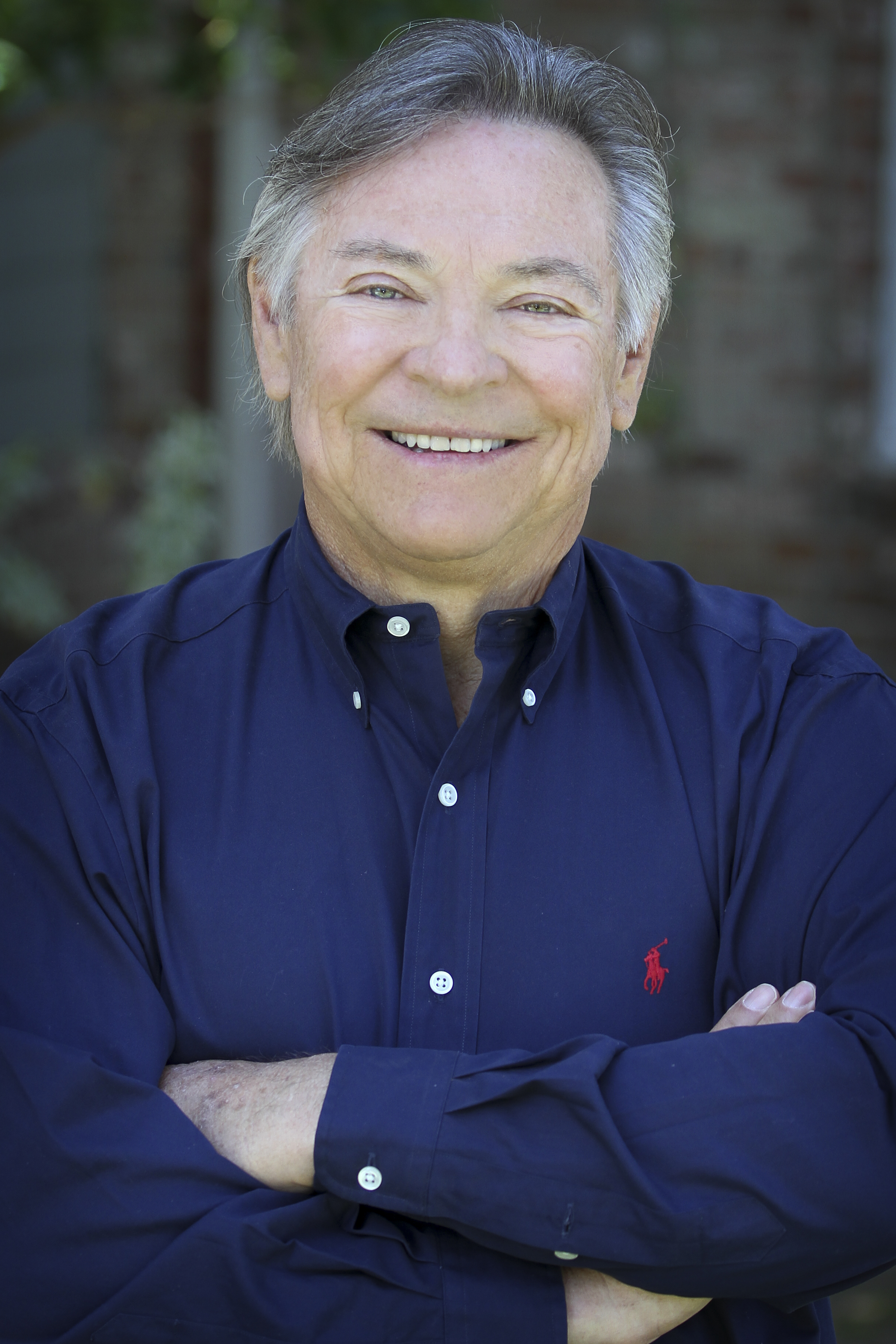
Welker in 2016

Frank Welker is an American voice actor who contributed character voices and other vocal effects to American television and motion pictures.

== Filmography ==
=== Film ===
List of voice performances in feature films
Year	Title	Role	Notes	Source
1976	Once Upon a Girl	Jack	(uncredited)	
1981	Raiders of the Lost Ark	Capuchin monkey	(uncredited)	
1981	Zorro, The Gay Blade	Narrator		
1982	Heidi's Song	Schnoodie, Hootie		
1983	Cujo	Cujo	(uncredited for barks, growls, and whines)	
1984	Nausicaä of the Valley of the Wind	Gol	2005 Disney dub	
1984	Up the Creek	Chuck the dog		
1984	Star Trek III: The Search for Spock	Spock's screams		
1984	Gremlins	Stripe, Mogwai, Gremlins		
1985	Cat's Eye	Cat, Troll		
1985	My Science Project	Aliens		
1986	Troll	Torok		
1986	TerrorVision	Monster		
1986	GoBots: Battle of the Rock Lords	Scooter, Zeemon, Rest-Q, Pulver-Eyes, Sticks, Narilphant		
1986	SpaceCamp	Jinx the robot		
1986	My Little Pony: The Movie	Bushwoolie #3, Grundle		
1986	The Transformers: The Movie	Megatron, Rumble, Wheelie, Frenzy, Junkion, Soundwave, Ravage		
1986	The Golden Child	Thing		
1987	The Chipmunk Adventure	Sophie Vorstein, Furschtein, Native Chief		
1987	Munchies	Munchie		
1987	G.I. Joe: The Movie	Torch, Wild Bill, Order		
1987	House II: The Second Story	Slim, Bippy the Doggypillar, Pterodactyl Chick		
1987	Pinocchio and the Emperor of the Night	Igor		
1988	My Neighbor Totoro	Totoro, Catbus	2005 Disney dub	
1988	Who Framed Roger Rabbit	Dumbo the Elephant		
1988	The New Adventures of Pippi Longstocking	Mister Neilson, Alfons		
1988	Caddyshack II	Gopher		
1988	Monkey Shines	Ella		
1988	Oliver & Company	Louie the Hot Dog Vendor, additional voices		
1989	Happily Ever After	Batso		
1989	Prancer	Prancer		
1989	The Little Mermaid	Max		
1990	Jetsons: The Movie	Grungees		
1990	DuckTales the Movie: Treasure of the Lost Lamp	Stuffed Tiger, additional voices		
1990	Tales from the Darkside: The Movie	Cat	Segment: "The Cat from Hell"	
1990	Gremlins 2: The New Batch	Mohawk		
1990	Graveyard Shift	Giant Bat		
1990	The Rescuers Down Under	Marahute, Joanna		
1991	Teenage Mutant Ninja Turtles II: The Secret of the Ooze	Tokka and Rahzar		
1991	Hudson Hawk	Bunny		
1991	Beauty and the Beast	Sultan/Special Vocal Effects		
1991	Bill & Ted's Bogus Journey	Satan, The Easter Bunny, and Station		
1992	Porco Rosso	Mamma Aiuto Gang	2005 English dub	
1992	Aladdin	Abu, Rajah, Cave of Wonders		
1992	The Gun in Betty Lou's Handbag	Scarlett		
1993	Super Mario Bros.	Yoshi, Goombas, creature voices		
1993	Man's Best Friend	Max, Cat		
1994	Monkey Trouble	Dodger		
1994	The Lion King	Lion roars, Mouse, additional voices		
1994	The Shadow	Phurba		
1994	The Next Karate Kid	Angel		
1994	Little Giants	X and O dots		
1994	Stargate	Mastadge		
1994	In Search of Dr. Seuss	Horton the Elephant, Mazie, Elephant-Bird, Chief Yookeroo, Van Itch		
1994	The Santa Clause	Reindeer		
1994	The Pagemaster	Horror		
1995	Tommy Boy	Deer		
1995	A Goofy Movie	Bigfoot		
1995	Gordy	Gordy, narrator		
1995	Congo	Gorillas		
1995	Pocahontas	Flit		
1995	Species	Alien Sil		
1995	Mortal Kombat	Shao Kahn and vocal effects of Reptile and Goro		
1996	Dunston Checks In	Neil		
1996	The Hunchback of Notre Dame	Baby Bird		
1996	Independence Day	Aliens		
1996	Space Jam	Charles the Dog		
1996	Mars Attacks!	Martians		
1997	Cats Don't Dance	Farley Wink		
1997	Anaconda	Anaconda		
1997	Buddy	Buddy		
1997	Hercules	Pegasus		
1997	Spawn	Malebolgia		
1997	A Christmas Carol	Debit		
1998	Quest for Camelot	Ayden		
1998	Godzilla	Godzilla		
1998	Jane Austen's Mafia!	Guard Sheep, Dinosaurs		
1998	Mulan	Cri-Kee, Khan		
1999	Doug's 1st Movie	Herman Melville		
1999	Deep Blue Sea	Parrot		
2000	The Tigger Movie	Bees, Frogs, additional voices		
2000	The Road to El Dorado	Altivo		
2000	How the Grinch Stole Christmas	Max		
2000	The Emperor's New Groove	Llamas, Jaguars, Misty, Bees		
2001	Jimmy Neutron: Boy Genius	Goddard, Orthgot, Worm, Demon, Poultra, Oyster, Girl Eating Plant		
2002	Return to Never Land	Nana 2, Giant Octopus		
2002	Scooby-Doo	Creature vocal effects		
2002	The Powerpuff Girls Movie	Whole Lotta Monkeys		
2002	Eight Legged Freaks	Consuela		
2003	Looney Tunes: Back in Action	Scooby-Doo	Cameo	
2003	The Cat in the Hat	Nevins		
2004	New York Minute	Reinaldo		
2006	Curious George	George		
2006	The Ant Bully	Spindle, Frog, Caterpillar		
2009	Transformers: Revenge of the Fallen	Soundwave, Devastator, Grindor, Reedman, Ravage		
2009	Curious George 2: Follow That Monkey!	Curious George, Duck, Cow		
2010	Alice in Wonderland	Bandersnatch		
2010	The Back-up Plan	Nuts		
2011	Transformers: Dark of the Moon	Shockwave, Barricade, Soundwave		
2011	The Smurfs	Azrael		
2012	The Outback	Higgens, Bull, Bully Koala #1, Bully Koala #3, Ringmaster		
2012	Mirror Mirror	Beast, Mannequins		
2012	Madagascar 3: Europe's Most Wanted	Sonya		
2013	The Smurfs 2	Azrael		
2014	Transformers: Age of Extinction	Galvatron		
2017	Smurfs: The Lost Village	Azrael		
2017	Transformers: The Last Knight	Megatron		
2019	Aladdin	Abu, Cave of Wonders		
2020	Scoob!	Scooby-Doo, Pterodactyl		
2023	Once Upon a Studio	Abu, Joanna	Short film	Archive recordings
2026	Optimus Prime: Awakening	Megatron, Soundwave	Short film	

=== List of voice performances in direct-to-video and television films ===
Year	Title	Role	Notes	Source
1969–	Scooby-Doo film series	Fred Jones, Scooby-Doo, additional voices		
1978	The Flintstones: Little Big League	Bamm-Bamm Rubble, Short Police Officer		
1978	Hanna-Barbera's All-Star Comedy Ice Revue	Jabberjaw		
1981	Faeries	Puck, Fir Darrig, Trow #3, Hunter #3		
1981	The Looney, Looney, Looney Bugs Bunny Movie	Lawyer, Interviewing Dog		
1982	The Grinch Grinches the Cat in the Hat	Max, Waiter		
1982	Christmas Comes to Pac-Land	Chomp Chomp, Morris		
1983	Deck the Halls with Wacky Walls	Bouncing Baby Boo, Al, Kenzo, Alien Astronomer		
1984	Gallavants	Antik, Traw		
1985	Rose Petal Place: Real Friends	Seymour, Horace		
1985	The GLO Friends Save Christmas	Glo Sluggerbug, Christmas Elf		
1985	The Pound Puppies	Howler, Catgut, Snichey		
1987	The Little Troll Prince	Prag #2		
1987	The Jetsons Meet the Flintstones	Mr. Goldbrick, Dan Rathmoon		
1988	Top Cat and the Beverly Hills Cats	Rasputin, Dobey		
1988	The Good, the Bad, and Huckleberry Hound	Bob (Huckleberry's Horse), Chief, Judge Tumbleweed Flopner, Race Track Announcer		
1990	Roller Coaster Rabbit	Bull	Roger Rabbit short film	
1990	The Prince and the Pauper	Dying King		
1991	The Little Engine That Could	Perky, Eagle, Farnsworth, Jebediah, Rollo		
1991	Beastmaster 2: Through the Portal of Time	Sharak, Kodo, Podo, Ruh		
1992	Tiny Toon Adventures: How I Spent My Vacation	Uncle Stinky, additional voices		
1993	Trail Mix-Up	Beaver, Bear	Roger Rabbit short film	
1993	Dollman vs. Demonic Toys	Baby Oopsy-Daisy		
1993	Hollyrock-a-Bye Baby	Barney Rubble, Dino		
1994	The Return of Jafar	Abu, Rajah		
1994	MAD	Black Spy, additional voices		
1994	A Flintstones Christmas Carol	Barney Rubble, Dino		
1995	The Tale of Tillie's Dragon	Mayor Simmons		
1995	The Land Before Time III: The Time of the Great Giving	Velociraptors		
1996	Aladdin and the King of Thieves	Abu, Rajah, Fazahl		
1996	The Land Before Time IV: Journey Through the Mists	Tickles		
1997	Beauty and the Beast: The Enchanted Christmas	Phillippe, Sultan		
1997	Tamagotchi Video Adventures	Maskutchi		
1998	Belle's Magical World	Sultan		
1998	Pocahontas II: Journey to a New World	Flit		
1998	Rusty: A Dog's Tale	Boss Duck		
1998	The Jungle Book: Mowgli's Story	Bad Baboon 2, Deer, Mandrill 1, Porcupine		
1999	Our Friend, Martin	Chihuahua, Bull Connor		
1999	A Saintly Switch	Voltaire		
1999	Treehouse Hostage	Kato		
1999	Alvin and the Chipmunks Meet Frankenstein	"Frankie" The Monster		
1999	Mickey's Once Upon a Christmas	Turkey, Figaro		
1999	Wakko's Wish	Thaddeus Plotz, Ralph the Security Guard, Buttons, Runt, Flavio Hippo, Chicken Boo		
2000	Buzz Lightyear of Star Command: The Adventure Begins	Grubs, Self Destruct, Ranger #1, Rhizomian Man, Cadet Flarn		
2000	Python	Python		
2000	It's the Pied Piper, Charlie Brown	Mayor		
2000	Tweety's High-Flying Adventure	Mugsy, Hugo the Abominable Snowman, Hector, Additional voices		
2000	The Little Mermaid II: Return to the Sea	Max		
2000	Batman Beyond: Return of the Joker	Ace the Bat-Hound, Woof		
2001	Lady and the Tramp II: Scamp's Adventure	Reggie (Street Dog)		
2001	The Flintstones: On the Rocks	Dino, Monkey, Elevator Guy		
2002	Cinderella II: Dreams Come True	Lucifer, Pom-Pom, Bruno		
2002	Tom and Jerry: The Magic Ring	Jerry, Tyke, Old Man		
2002	Globehunters: An Around the World in Eighty Days Adventure	Circus Baboon, Security Guard		
2002	The Hunchback of Notre Dame II	Achilles, Djali		
2003	Stitch! The Movie	Sparky, additional voices		
2003	Atlantis: Milo's Return	Obby, Mantell		
2004	Tremors 4: The Legend Begins	Graboids		
2004	Mickey, Donald, Goofy: The Three Musketeers	Additional voices		
2004	Halloweentown High	Purse Creature		
2004	Mulan II	Cri-Kee		
2005	Tom and Jerry: Blast Off to Mars	Spike, Ubu		
2006	Bambi II	Additional voices		
2006	Leroy & Stitch	Sparky, additional voices		
2006	Codename: Kids Next Door - Operation Z.E.R.O.	Monty Uno / Numbuh 0		
2007	Cinderella III: A Twist in Time	Lucifer		
2007	Garfield Gets Real	Garfield, Goth Kid, Hardy, Keith, Nerd, Prop Boy, Two Headed Guy		
2007	Disney Princess Enchanted Tales: Follow Your Dreams	Abu, Rajah		
2007	Transformers: Beginnings	Megatron		
2007	Futurama: Bender's Big Score	Nibbler, Fleb, Zylex, Seymour		
2008	Garfield's Fun Fest	Garfield, Delivery Gnome, Jeff, Leonard, Prop Boy		
2008	Banana Splits	Bingo		
2008	Futurama: Bender's Game	Nibbler		
2009	Garfield's Pet Force	Garfield/Garzooka, additional voices, narrator		
2009	Lego Star Wars: The Quest for R2-D2	Exogorth		
2009	Curious George: A Very Monkey Christmas	Curious George, Stig		
2010	Firebreather	Dragon #1		
2012	Scooby-Doo! Spooky Games	Scooby-Doo, Fred Jones	Direct-to-DVD special	
2012; 2013	Batman: The Dark Knight Returns	Mayor Stevenson	2-part special	
2013	Curious George Swings Into Spring	Curious George, Stig, Flint Quint		
2013	Scooby-Doo! and the Spooky Scarecrow	Scooby-Doo, Fred Jones	Direct-to-DVD special	
2013	Transformers Prime Beast Hunters: Predacons Rising	Megatron		
2014	Stan Lee's Mighty 7	General		
2015	Scooby-Doo! Ghastly Goals	Scooby-Doo, Fred Jones, Eshu	Direct-to-DVD special	
2015	Curious George 3: Back to the Jungle	Curious George		
2016	Lego Scooby-Doo! Haunted Hollywood	Scooby Doo, Fred Jones		
2017	The Jetsons & WWE: Robo-WrestleMania!	Astro		
2018	Scooby-Doo! and the Gourmet Ghost	Scooby Doo, Fred Jones		
2019	Scooby-Doo! Return to Zombie Island	Scooby Doo, Fred Jones		
2019	Curious George: Royal Monkey	George, Phillippe		
2020	Curious George: Go West, Go Wild	George		
2020	Happy Halloween, Scooby-Doo!	Scooby-Doo, Fred Jones		
2021	Scooby-Doo! The Sword and the Scoob	Scooby-Doo, Fred Jones, Monster		
2021	Straight Outta Nowhere: Scooby-Doo! Meets Courage the Cowardly Dog	Scooby-Doo, Fred Jones		
2021	Curious George: Cape Ahoy	George		
2022	Trick or Treat Scooby-Doo!	Scooby-Doo, Fred Jones, Rudy, Count Nefario		
2023	Scooby-Doo! and Krypto, Too!	Scooby-Doo, Fred Jones		

=== Television ===
List of voice performances in television series
Year	Title	Role	Notes	Source
1969–70	Scooby-Doo, Where Are You!	Fred Jones, additional voices		
1972–73	The New Scooby-Doo Movies	Fred Jones, Sheriff Dandy Griffith		
1972	The ABC Saturday Superstar Movie	Mike	Episode: "Tabitha and Adam and the Clown Family"	
1973	Bailey's Comets	Pudge	4 episodes	
1973	Super Friends	Marvin, Wonder Dog, Holo, Igor, additional voices		
1973	Butch Cassidy	Elvis		
1974	Valley of the Dinosaurs	Lok, Digger, Glump		
1974	Partridge Family 2200 A.D.	Orbit		
1974	Hong Kong Phooey	The Claw	Episode: "The Claw/Hong Kong Phooey vs. Hong Kong Phooey"	
1974	Wheelie and the Chopper Bunch	Wheelie, Chopper	13 episodes	
1976–77	Dynomutt, Dog Wonder	Dynomutt the Dog Wonder		
1976	Jabberjaw	Jabberjaw	16 episodes	
1976	Cos	Jabberjaw		
1976–78	The Scooby-Doo/Dynomutt Hour	Dynomutt, Fred, additional voices		
1977	ABC Weekend Special	O.G. Readmore, Caesar, Ken, Bunjee, Willy, Pterodactyl, Tyrannosaur, Champ	12 episodes	
1977	Laff-A-Lympics	Dynomutt, Tinker, Yakky Doodle, Magic Rabbit, Sooey, Jabberjaw		
1977–78	The Robonic Stooges	Curly, Narrator, Ludwig Lillyput, Dr. Blobbenstein, Dr. Crackula, Aristotle Beastly, Professor Hate, Mouse Louse		
1977–80	Captain Caveman and the Teen Angels	Morgan, Cecil Skink, additional voices	39 episodes	
1978	Dinky Dog	Dinky Dog	16 episodes	
1978	Challenge of the Superfriends	The Toyman, Lilliputians, Mort	16 episodes	
1978	Fangface	Fangs/Fangface/Sherman Fangsworth		
1978	Yogi's Space Race	Jabberjaw, Buford, Nugget Nose, Captain Good, Phantom Phink, Clean Kat, Sinister Sludge		
1978	Buford and the Galloping Ghost	Buford, Nugget Nose		
1978	The New Fantastic Four	H.E.R.B.I.E., Impossible Man	13 episodes	
1979	The New Adventures of Mighty Mouse and Heckle & Jeckle	Heckle and Jeckle, Quacula, additional voices		
1979	The New Shmoo	Shmoo		
1979	The Super Globetrotters	Crime Globe, additional voices	10 episodes	
1979	The World's Greatest Super Friends	Mr. Mxyzptlk, Hour Glass Cult Members, Spider Creature	2 episodes	
1979–80	Scooby-Doo and Scrappy-Doo	Fred Jones, additional voices		
1979–80	Mighty Man and Yukk	Yukk		
1980	The Tom and Jerry Comedy Show	Spike, Tyke, Droopy, Slick Wolf, Barney Bear, additional voices		
1980	The Flintstone Comedy Show	Shmoo, Rockjaw	3 episodes	
1980	The Frankenstones	Rockjaw		
1980–81	Sport Billy	Willy, Sporticus XI, Sipe		
1980–81	The Richie Rich/Scooby-Doo Show	Dollar, additional voices	13 episodes	
1980–81	The Fonz and the Happy Days Gang	Mr. Cool		
1980–82	Heathcliff	Dingbat		
1980–83	Super Friends	Mr. Mxyzptlk, additional voices	17 episodes	
1981	Space Stars	Cosmo	11 episodes	
1981	Trollkins	Bogg, Flooky, Top Troll	13 episodes	
1981	Blackstar	Gossamear, Burble, Rif	13 episodes	
1981	The Kwicky Koala Show	Dirty Dawg	16 episodes	
1981–83	Spider-Man and His Amazing Friends	Bobby Drake/Iceman, Flash Thompson, Daredevil, Ms. Lion	24 episodes	
1981–89	The Smurfs	Hefty Smurf, Clockwork Smurf, Peewit, Poet Smurf, Puppy, Wild Smurf, additional voices	199 episodes	
1982	Mork & Mindy/Laverne & Shirley/Fonz Hour	Doing, Mr. Cool	22 episodes	
1982	The Scooby and Scrappy-Doo Puppy Hour	Additional voices	13 episodes	
1982	Richie Rich	Dollar the Dog, Dr. Blemish, Suavo	Episode: "Dollar's Exercise/Richie's Cube/The Maltese Monkey/Everybody's Doing It"	
1982–83	Pac-Man	Chomp Chomp, Morris, Adult Pac-Baby	16 episodes	
1983	The Dukes	Flash, Smokey, General Lee	20 episodes	
1983	Saturday Supercade	Donkey Kong Junior, Q* Dad, Q* Mungus, Q* Ball, Coilee, Ugg, Wrongway, Sam Slick	3 episodes	
1983–85	The Littles	Slick the Turtle	13 episodes	
1983–85	Inspector Gadget	Brain, Dr. Claw, M.A.D. Cat	80 episodes	
1983–85	Dungeons & Dragons	Uni, Tiamat, additional voices	27 episodes	
1984	Turbo Teen	Flip, Rusty, Dark Rider	13 episodes	
1984	Wolf Rock TV	Bopper		
1984	Super Friends: The Legendary Super Powers Show	Darkseid, Kalibak, Mr. Mxyzptlk, Dollmaker	6 episodes	
1984	The New Scooby and Scrappy-Doo Show	Fred Jones, additional voices		
1984	The Get Along Gang	Various voices	6 episodes	
1984–91	Muppet Babies	Baby Kermit, Baby Beaker, Skeeter, Irma	107 episodes	
1984–88	Snorks	Occy, Tooter, Grandpa Wentworth, The Great Snork Nork, Finneus, additional voices	65 episodes	
1984–87	The Transformers	Blades, Chromedome, Frenzy, Groove, Jazz (commercials only), Megatron/Galvatron, Mirage, Mixmaster, Ratbat, Ravage, Rumble, Sharkticon, Skywarp, Sludge, Soundwave, Superion, Sweep, Trailbreaker, Wreck-Gar (commercials), additional voices	93 episodes	
1984–85	Lucky Luke	Joe Dalton	English dub	
1984–85	Challenge of the GoBots	Scooter, Zeemon, Blaster, Rest-Q		
1985	Galtar and the Golden Lance	Tuk, Thork, Koda		
1985	The Super Powers Team: Galactic Guardians	Darkseid, Kalibak, The Joker, Ace the Bat-Hound, The Penguin, Mr. Mxyzptlk		
1985	The Jetsons	Orbitty, Richard Rocketeer, Ghost of Christmas Present, Young Mr. Spacely, Teenage Spacely		
1985	13 Ghosts of Scooby-Doo	Griswald, Idesvigg, additional voices	4 episodes	
1985–86	Paw Paws	Ross Bumble Paw		
1985–86	G.I. Joe: A Real American Hero	Copperhead, Flash, Freedom, Junkyard, Polly, Short-Fuse, Timber, Torch, Wild Bill, additional voices		
1986	The Centurions	Terry, Lunex, Zorg		
1986	Rambo: The Force of Freedom	Mad Dog		
1986	Sectaurs	Skulk, Trancula, Raplor	5 episodes	
1986	Kissyfur	Claudette, Uncle Shelby	Episode: "The Birds and the Bears"	
1986	Lazer Tag Academy	Mr. Jaren, Skuggs, Ralphie		
1986	Jonny Quest	Dr. Phorbus	Episode: "Peril of the Reptilian"	
1986	My Little Pony 'n Friends	Flores, Pluma (ghost form), Dinah, Bray, Squirk	2 episodes	
1986–87	Foofur	Foofur		
1986–87	The Flintstone Kids	Nate Slate, Thug, Stalagbite		
1986–87	Pound Puppies	Catgut, additional voices		
1986–91	The Real Ghostbusters	Slimer, Ray Stantz, Samhaine, The Stay-Puft Marshmallow Man, The Bogeyman, The Sandman		
1986–91	Adventures of the Gummi Bears	Jabber, Zephyrs, Marquis de Bouillabaisse, additional voices	10 episodes	
1987	Bionic Six	Glove, Mechanic, Spot	62 episodes	
1987	Spiral Zone	Dr. Harold Lawrence, Razorback, Ned Tucker	65 episodes	
1987	Popeye and Son	Shelley's Father	Episode: "The Girl from Down Under"	
1987–90	DuckTales	Bigtime Beagle, Baggy Beagle, Bubba, Tootsie, Poe De Spell, The Phantom Blot	57 episodes	
1988	Dino Riders	Krulos, Rasp, Glyde	14 episodes	
1988	Superman	Cybron	Episode: "Cybron Strikes/The First Day of School"	
1988	The Completely Mental Misadventures of Ed Grimley	Sheldon, additional voices		
1988–94	Garfield and Friends	Booker, Sheldon, Bo, Mort, Fred Duck, Doctor Garbanzo Bean	118 episodes	
1988–89	A Pup Named Scooby-Doo	Uncle Eddie Jones, Chickenstein, Casmer Codwaller, Ghost of Al Cabone, Bruce Wormsley, Dinkley 2000, additional voices	5 episodes	
1988–89	This Is America, Charlie Brown	Abraham Lincoln, Theodore Roosevelt, Alexander Graham Bell, Thomas Edison, Wilbur Wright, Squanto, various characters	6 episodes	
1989	Chip 'n Dale: Rescue Rangers	Todd, Ribbit	2 episodes	
1989	The Further Adventures of SuperTed	Bulk, Bubbles the Clown, Pengy, Prince Pyjamarama		
1989	X-Men: Pryde of the X-Men	Toad, Lockheed		
1989	Blondie & Dagwood: Second Wedding Workout	Dagwood Bumstead, Mr. Ferguson		
1989	Hägar the Horrible: Hägar Knows Best	Snert, Principal		
1989	Dink, the Little Dinosaur	Crusty, Scat	4 episodes	
1990–91	Timeless Tales from Hallmark	Additional voices		
1990–91	TaleSpin	Additional voices	12 episodes	
1990	Midnight Patrol: Adventures in the Dream Zone	Murphy, Nosey Bird, Rocky	13 episodes	
1990	Gravedale High	Frankentyke, J.P. Ghastly the III, additional voices	13 episodes	
1990	Captain N: The Game Master	Game Boy		
1990	The Adventures of Don Coyote and Sancho Panda	Don Coyote, Dapple the Donkey	Episode: "Pity the Poor Pirate"	
1990–92	Tiny Toon Adventures	Gogo Dodo, Furrball, Calamity Coyote, Little Beeper, Byron Basset, additional voices		
1990–92	Darkwing Duck	Eek, Squeak, Archie, additional voices		
1990–93	Tom & Jerry Kids	Tom, Jerry, McWolf, additional voices		
1990–93	The Pirates of Dark Water	Niddler, Dark Dweller, Morpho, Lugg Brother #2		
1990–96	Captain Planet and the Planeteers	Lead Suit, Suchi the Monkey, Tank Flusher, various humans and animals		
1990–98	Bobby's World	Roger the Dog	33 episodes	
1991–2014	The Simpsons	Santa's Little Helper, Snowball II, Lord Nibbler, additional voices including Snorky, the other Dolphins	20 episodes	
1991	Where's Waldo?	Additional voices		
1992–95	Capitol Critters	Presidential Cats		
1992–95	Batman: The Animated Series	Man-Bat, Isis, various animals, additional voices		
1992	Fish Police	Mussels Marinara, Doc Croaker, Louie	6 episodes	
1992	Goof Troop	Waffles the Cat, Chainsaw the Dog, additional voices		
1992–93	The Little Mermaid	Penny the Cat, Lucky, additional voices		
1993–94	Mighty Max	Warmonger, Escaped Scientist, Lava Lord	8 episodes	
1993–94	Bonkers	Fall-Apart Rabbit, Toots, Roderick, Sniffle, Turbo, Toon Bag, Pops Clock		
1993–94	SWAT Kats: The Radical Squadron	Dr. Viper/Dr. Purvis, various voices		
1993–94	Cro	Earle, Gogg, Bobb		
1993–96	SeaQuest DSV	Darwin the Dolphin		
1993–98	Animaniacs	Runt, Flavio Hippo, Buttons, Ralph the Guard, Thaddeus Plotz, Chicken Boo, Steven Spielberg, Bill Clinton, Mindy's Dad, Ronald Reagan, Doug the Dog, Bob Hope, Alfred Hitchcock, Elmer Fudd, Benjamin Franklin, Occasional Segment Narration		
1993	Droopy, Master Detective	McWolf, Dweeble	2 episodes	
1993	Sonic the Hedgehog	Additional voices		
1994–95	Aladdin	Abu, Rajah, Xerxes, Hakim, Fazahl, Nahbi, additional voices		
1994–96	Gargoyles	Bronx, Baby Alex, Cagney, various animals		
1995	Dumb and Dumber	Guard, Vinnie Jr., Seattle Sloth		
1995–97	The Mask: Animated Series	Milo, Baby Forthwright		
1995–99	Timon & Pumbaa	Various animals and characters		
1995–99	The Sylvester and Tweety Mysteries	Hector		
1995–96	The Savage Dragon	Arachnid	4 episodes	
1995–96	Freakazoid!	Mister Chubbikins, Steven Spielberg, Bill Clinton, Frank the Guard, additional voices		
1995–96	The Adventures of Hyperman	Entrobe	13 episodes	
1995–98	Pinky and the Brain	Steven Spielberg, Bill Clinton, Maurice, additional voices	27 episodes	
1996–2003	Dexter's Laboratory	Monkey, Quackor, The Infraggible Krunk, Mister Luzinsky, "Master Computer", Badaxtra		
1996	The Spooktacular New Adventures of Casper	Clarance, Mortimer Pennypincher	2 episodes	
1996	The Mighty Ducks	Chameleon	4 episodes	
1996	Gargoyles: The Goliath Chronicles	Bronx, Banquo, Cagney, additional voices	4 episodes	
1996	Cave Kids	Dino, additional voices	7 episodes	
1996	Mortal Kombat: Defenders of the Realm	Additional voices	2 episodes	
1996	Jungle Cubs	Animal voices	3 episodes	
1996	The Hot Rod Dogs and Cool Car Cats	Benz		
1996	Waynehead	Tripod		
1996–97	The Real Adventures of Jonny Quest	Bandit, Dr. Jeremiah Surd, additional voices		
1996–97	Road Rovers	Muzzle, Shag		
1996–97	Quack Pack	The Claw, Knuckles	13 episodes	
1996–2000	Adventures from the Book of Virtues	Socrates	27 episodes	
1996–98	Superman: The Animated Series	Krypto, Titano, Prometheon, Serpent, Doorward, Scientist	7 episodes	
1997	The Legend of Calamity Jane	Joe Presto		
1997	Extreme Ghostbusters	Ray Stantz	2 episodes	
1997–2004	Johnny Bravo	Fred Jones, Speed Buggy, Jabberjaw, Barney Rubble, Dino, additional voices		
1997–98	101 Dalmatians: The Series	Captain, Scorch, Steven the Alligator, Thunderbolt, Cydne the Snake	64 episodes	
1998–99	Hercules: The Animated Series	Pegasus, Abu, additional voices		
1998–99	Pinky, Elmyra & the Brain	Additional voices	4 episodes	
1998–99	Godzilla: The Series	Godzilla		
1998–2000	Histeria!	Father Time, Pule Houser, Fetch, additional voices		
1998–2004	The Powerpuff Girls	Abracadaver, Bullet the Squirrel, additional voices	10 episodes	
1998	Oh Yeah! Cartoons	Martian Leader	Episode: "Jamal the Funny Frog: Mind the Baby, Jamal/Thatta Boy/Hobart: The Weedkeeper"	
1999	The Wild Thornberrys	Mox, Macqaque Wallah	Episode: "Rumble in the Jungle"	
1999	I Am Weasel	Coyote, additional voices	Episode: "The Baboon's Paw"	
1999	Cow and Chicken	Coyote, Old Man, Man #2	3 episodes	
1999	Xyber 9: New Dawn	Honk	Episode: "Origins Part 3: First Impressions"	
1999	The Scooby-Doo Project	Fred Jones	TV special	
1999–2011	Family Guy	Freddy Jones, Kermit the Frog, Megatron, additional voices	4 episodes	
1999–present	Futurama	Nibbler (both talking and non-talking versions), Seymour, additional voices	40 episodes	
1999–2001	Recess	Senior Fusion, additional voices	5 episodes	
1999–2000	Mickey Mouse Works	The Abominable Snowman, Aracuan Bird, Butch the Bulldog, Figaro, Louie the Mountain Lion, Lion, Mr. Pettibone, Salty the Seal	11 episodes	
1999–2000	Batman Beyond	Ace the Bat-Hound	4 Episodes	
2000	Buzz Lightyear of Star Command	Grubs, Brain Pods, Additional voices		
2000	CatDog	Bessie the Sea Monster	Episode: "CatDog and the Great Parent Mystery"	
2000–02	Jackie Chan Adventures	Dai Gui the Earth Demon, Additional voices	5 episodes	
2001–02	House of Mouse	Gus Goose, Abu, Aracuan Bird, Butch the Bulldog, Cri-Kee, Dodger, Figaro, Flit, Louie the Mountain Lion, Lucifer, Pegasus, Salty the Seal, Tantor	25 episodes	
2001–03	SpongeBob SquarePants	Clamu, Baby oyster, Mystery the Seahorse, Gorilla	3 episodes	
2001	Time Squad	French Captains, Horses, James Sherman/Zombie	2 episodes	
2001	The Legend of Tarzan	Manu, additional voices	8 episodes	
2001	The Weekenders	Dog, Turkey	Episode: "The Worst Holiday Ever"	
2001–07	The Grim Adventures of Billy & Mandy	Boskov, HokeyMonsters, Barney Rubble, Scooby-Doo, Trilord, Lazlo, Shnissugah, various characters	20 episodes	
2002	¡Mucha Lucha!	Masked Dog	Episode: "Back to School/Weight Gaining"	
2002–04	Totally Spies!	Sherman the Gorilla, additional voices	2 episodes	
2002–06	The Adventures of Jimmy Neutron: Boy Genius	Goddard, Special Vocal Effects, Additional voices	53 episodes	
2002–06	What's New, Scooby-Doo?	Fred Jones, Scooby-Doo		
2002–07	Harvey Birdman, Attorney at Law	Jabberjaw, Biff, Bus Driver, Avenger, Fred Jones, additional voices	4 episodes	
2002–07	Codename: Kids Next Door	Professor XXXL, Monty Uno/Numbuh 0, Bus Driver, Radio Announcer, Rainbow Monkey Kong	12 episodes	
2003	Static Shock	Officer Packard	Episode: "The Usual Suspect"	
2003–07	Kim Possible	Various villains and creatures	9 episodes	
2003–07	Lilo & Stitch: The Series	Sparky, Kixx, Mr. Stenchy, Splodyhead, Finder, Swapper, Poxy, additional voices	12 episodes	
2003–04	Evil Con Carne	Boskov the Bear, Private Simmons, narrator, various voices	9 episodes	
2003–04	Ozzy & Drix	Dandor, Billy Blob Bile, additional voices	3 episodes	
2003–05	Duck Dodgers	Captain Rodman, Ch'p, K-9, Maninsuit	8 episodes	
2004	My Life as a Teenage Robot	Cafe Host, Bystander, Fly	Episode: "Saved by the Shell/Tradeshow Showdown"	
2004	Fatherhood	Guinness, Mouse	2 episodes	
2004	Super Robot Monkey Team Hyperforce Go!	Thingy	Episode: "Thingy"	
2004–05	Dave the Barbarian	Faffy	21 episodes	
2004–05	Megas XLR	Gyven, Mac, Targon, additional voices	3 episodes	
2004–05	Danny Phantom	Shadow, Crows, Ectopus	2 episodes	
2004–06	Jimmy Timmy Power Hour	Goddard, Special Vocal Effects	Television film	
2005	W.I.T.C.H.	Additional voices		
2006–07	The Emperor's New School	Creepy Old Man, Skeleton Anteater, Homework, additional voices	4 episodes	
2006–14	Mickey Mouse Clubhouse	Mr. Pettibone, Butch, Big Red Gooey Fish, Grasshopper Wilbur, Bella, Sheep, Figaro	22 episodes	
2006–14	Robot Chicken	Megatron, Soundwave, The Phantom, Dr. Claw, Brain, Billy's Dad, Mr. Potato Head, Cy-Kill, Barack Obama, Robert Baratheon, Lego NASA Officer 2, Pizzeria Owner, Scientist, Rebellion Leader, Cybernetics Doctor, Indian Chief	7 episodes	
2006	Danger Rangers	Rufio, Sparky, Mr. Sherman	Episode: "Dog Days"	
2006–22	Curious George	Curious George	198 episodes	
2006–08	Shaggy & Scooby-Doo Get a Clue!	Scooby-Doo, Fred Jones, additional voices	26 episodes	
2008, 2010	Ni Hao, Kai-Lan	Mr. Dragon	2 episodes	
2008–15	The Garfield Show	Garfield		
2009	Titan Maximum	Coop	Episode: "One Billion Dead Grandparents"	
2010–13	Scooby-Doo! Mystery Incorporated	Scooby-Doo, Fred Jones, Barty Blake, Dynomutt, Jabberjaw, Speed Buggy, other characters		
2010–13	Transformers: Prime	Megatron, Soundwave		
2011–23	Bubble Guppies	Bubble Puppy	129 episodes	
2011	Generator Rex	One, IV	Episode: "Divided by Six"	
2011	Batman: The Brave and the Bold	Scooby-Doo, Fred Jones, Batboy, Batman (Scooby-Doo version)	Episode: "Bat-Mite Presents: Batman's Strangest Cases!"	
2011–12	Pound Puppies	Catgut, Nabbit, additional voices	2 episodes	
2012–13	Mad	Garfield, Scooby-Doo, Fred Jones, other characters	5 episodes	
2012	Teenage Mutant Ninja Turtles	Dr. Rockwell	Episode: "Monkey Brains"	
2013	Scooby-Doo! Mecha Mutt Menace	Scooby-Doo, Fred Jones, Presenter		
2013–14	Avengers Assemble	Odin	2 episodes	
2014–21	The Tom and Jerry Show	Tyke, Baby Dragon, Bear Cub, additional voices		
2015	Hulk and the Agents of S.M.A.S.H.	Odin	Episode: "Days of Future Smash, Part 2: Smashguard"	
2015	Shimmer and Shine	Squirrel #1, Squirrel #2 (Genie Treehouse)		
2015	Lego Scooby-Doo! Knight Time Terror	Scooby-Doo, Fred Jones	Television special	
2015	The Adventures of Puss in Boots	Baby Dragon	Episode: "Dragon"	
2015–17	Be Cool, Scooby-Doo!	Scooby-Doo, Fred Jones		
2016	Wander Over Yonder	Announcer	Episode: "The Cartoon/The Bot"	
2016–18	Trollhunters: Tales of Arcadia	Fragwa, Goblins	21 episodes	
2017	Transformers: Robots in Disguise	Soundwave	Episode: "King of the Hill: Part 2"	
2017	Guardians of the Galaxy	Odin	Episode: "Symbiote War Part 3: Thunder Road"	
2018	Supernatural	Fred Jones, Scooby-Doo	Episode: "Scoobynatural"	
2018–19	3Below: Tales of Arcadia	Luug	26 episodes	
2018–19	Star Wars Resistance	Chelidae		
2019–21	Scooby-Doo and Guess Who?	Fred Jones, Scooby-Doo, Magilla Gorilla, Himself		
2019	Rise of the Teenage Mutant Ninja Turtles	Yōkai Councillor #2	Episode: "End Game"	
2019, 2023	Teen Titans Go!	Fred Jones, Scooby-Doo	2 episodes	
2020–23	Animaniacs	Ralph the Guard, Chicken Boo		
2023–24	Velma	William Jones		
2024–25	Jellystone!	Fred Jones, Dexter's Computer, Monkey	2 episodes	
2026	Invincible	Emperor Argall, Viltrumites	Episode: "Don't Do Anything Rash"	
TBA	Yokoso Scooby-Doo!	Scooby-Doo		

=== Video games ===
List of voice performances in video games
Year	Title	Role	Notes	Source
1995	Disney's Animated Storybook: Pocahontas	Meeko, Percy, Flit		
1996	Toonstruck	Mouse, Elmer, Squirrel, Elephant, Vulture, Scarecrow, Bowling Bear, The Myna Bird, Surveillance Guard, Ray, Venus Flytrap		
1997	Fallout	John Maxson		
1998	Quest 64	Various animal vocal effects (uncredited)		
1998	Disney's Animated Storybook: Mulan	Cri-Kee		
1998	Disney's Math Quest with Aladdin	Abu, Wacky		
1998	Animaniacs: Ten Pin Alley	Thaddeus Plotz, Ralph the Guard		
1998	Baldur's Gate	Elminster Aumar, Eltan, Korax, Necromancer, Xzar		
2000	Scooby-Doo! Phantom of the Knight	Fred Jones		
2000	Scooby-Doo! Showdown in Ghost Town	Fred Jones		
2000	Mickey Mouse Kindergarten	Weasel, Chief O'Hara, Robot, Bellhop #4		
2000	Donald Duck: Goin' Quackers	Gyro Gearloose, Beagle Boy		
2000	The Flintstones: Bedrock Bowling	Barney Rubble, Dino, Rock Crusher		
2000	Buzz Lightyear of Star Command: The Video Game	Plasma Monster		
2000	Clifford the Big Red Dog: Thinking Adventures	Clifford, Rocky, Traffic People		
2000	Clifford the Big Red Dog: Learning Activities	Manny, Sheriff Lewis		
2001	Floigan Bros.	Moigle Floigan		
2001	Jimmy Neutron: Boy Genius	Goddard	PC Version	
2001	Scooby-Doo! Jinx at the Sphinx	Fred Jones		
2002	Disney's Stitch: Experiment 626	Experiment 621 (Chopsuey), Mutant Greema		
2002	Scooby-Doo! Night of 100 Frights	Fred Jones, additional voices		
2002	Jimmy Neutron: Boy Genius	Goddard	PS2 Version	
2002	Jimmy Neutron vs. Jimmy Negatron	Goddard		
2002	Scooby-Doo! The Glowing Bug Man	Fred Jones		
2002	Star Wars The Clone Wars: The Video Game	Outpost Commander, Wookie		
2003	Scooby-Doo! The Scary Stone Dragon	Fred Jones		
2003	The Adventures of Jimmy Neutron Boy Genius: Jet Fusion	Goddard		
2004	The Adventures of Jimmy Neutron Boy Genius: Attack of the Twonkies	Goddard, Security Guard		
2005	Scooby-Doo! Unmasked	Fred Jones, Professor Stoker		
2006	Curious George	Curious George		
2006	Kingdom Hearts II	Abu		
2006	Scooby-Doo: Frights, Camera, Mystery!	Fred Jones, J. Grizzly, Headless Stuntman		
2006	Scooby-Doo! Who's Watching Who?	Fred Jones, Catscan		
2007	Transformers: The Game	Megatron		
2007	Disney Princess: Enchanted Journey	Abu		
2009	Transformers: Revenge of the Fallen	Megatron		
2009	Scooby-Doo! First Frights	Fred Jones, Scooby-Doo, additional voices		
2010	Kingdom Hearts: Birth by Sleep	Sparky		
2010	Scooby-Doo! and the Spooky Swamp	Fred Jones, Scooby-Doo		
2010	Epic Mickey	Oswald the Lucky Rabbit, Shadow Blot, additional voices		
2011	Cartoon Network: Punch Time Explosion	Monkey		
2012	Transformers: Prime – The Game	Megatron		
2012	Epic Mickey 2: The Power of Two	Oswald the Lucky Rabbit		
2012	Epic Mickey: Power of Illusion	Oswald the Lucky Rabbit		
2013	StarCraft II: Heart of the Swarm	Zurvan		
2013	DuckTales: Remastered	Beagle Boys, Terra-Firmian King, Bubba Duck		
2014	Transformers Universe	Megatron		
2014	Scooby-Doo & Looney Tunes Cartoon Universe: Adventure	Fred Jones, Scooby-Doo		
2015	Transformers: Devastation	Megatron, Soundwave		
2015-2017	Lego Dimensions	Scooby-Doo, Fred Jones, Mumsy-Doo, Dada-Doo, Slimer, Stay Puft Marshmallow Man, Stripe, Stay Puft Parade Balloon, The Kraken	Grouped under "Voice Talent"	
2016	Lego Marvel Avengers	Odin		
2021	Nickelodeon All-Star Brawl	Garfield	Voiceover added in the June 2022 update	
2022	Nickelodeon Extreme Tennis	Garfield		
2022	Nickelodeon Kart Racers 3: Slime Speedway	Garfield		
2023	Nickelodeon All-Star Brawl 2	Garfield, Girl Eating Plant		

=== Theme park voice roles ===
- The Funtastic World of Hanna-Barbera – Barney Rubble, Dinosaur
- Scooby-Doo! The Museum of Mysteries – Fred Jones, Scooby-Doo
- Jimmy Neutron's Nicktoon Blast – Goddard, Poultra
- Transformers: The Ride – 3D – Megatron, Devastator, Ravage
- Hong Kong Disneyland Mystic Manor – Albert
- Kitchen Kabaret – Mr. Eggz
- Country Bear Vacation Hoedown – Melvin the Moose, Randy the Skunk
- The American Adventure – Soldier

=== Commercial roles ===
- Honey Smacks – Dig'em Frog
- McDonald's – Grimace, CosMc
- Rice Krispies – Crackle
- State Farm – Fred Jones, Scooby-Doo
- Froot Loops – Toucan Sam's Nephews, Newton Mole

== Live-action filmography ==
=== Film ===
List of live-action performances in film
Year	Title	Role	Notes	Source
1969	The Trouble with Girls	Rutgers		
1969	The Computer Wore Tennis Shoes	Henry Farthington		
1971	How to Frame a Figg	Prentiss Gates		
1972	Now You See Him, Now You Don't	Henry Farthington		
2009	The Informant!	Mr. Whitacre		

=== Television ===
List of live-action performances in television
Year	Title	Role	Notes	Source
1972	The Partridge Family	Sioux	Episode: "My Heart Belongs to a Two Car Garage"	
1973	The Paul Lynde Show	Freddy	Episode: "Springtime for Paul"	
1976–mid 1980s	Burger King/Burger King Kingdom commercials	The Burger Thing		
1976–1977	Wonderbug	Schlepcar/Wonderbug		
1986	Amazing Stories	Greibble	Episode: "The Greibble"	
1986–2003	McDonald's/McDonaldland commercials	Grimace, CosMc		
1999	Nash Bridges	Bananas the Chimp	Episode: "Get Bananas" Vocal Effects and Sounds for Bananas the Chimp	
2027	Scooby-Doo: Origins	Scooby-Doo	Voice	
