= Frank Welker =

American actor (born 1946)

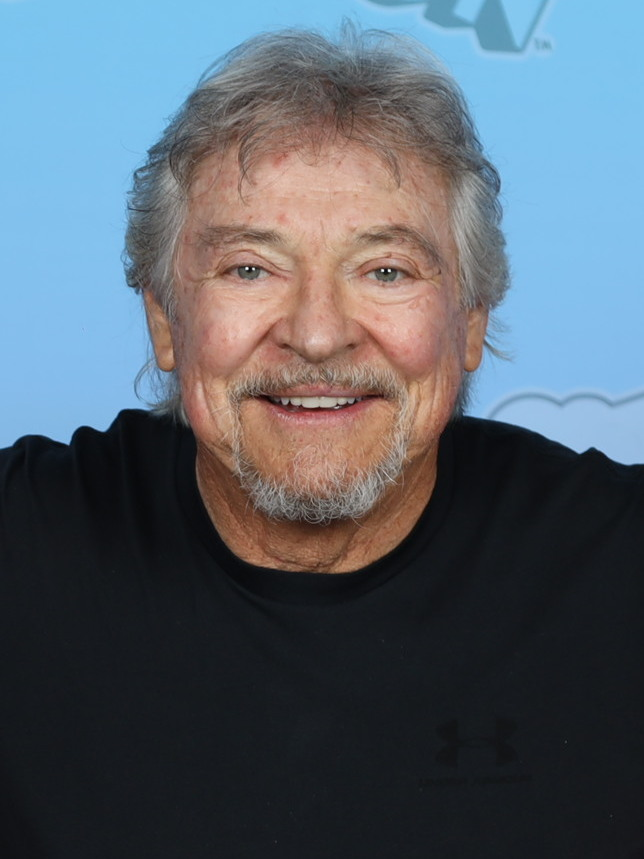
- Welker at GalaxyCon Raleigh in 2023
- Born: Franklin Wendell Welker; March 12, 1946 (age 80); Denver, Colorado, US
- Education: Santa Monica College
- Occupation: Actor
- Years active: 1967–present
- Works: Full list
- Website: frankwelker.com

Franklin Wendell Welker (born March 12, 1946) is an American actor. He began his career in the 1960s, and held around 850 film, television, and video game credits as of 2020, making him one of the most prolific voice actors in history. With his films earning a total worldwide box-office gross of $17.4 billion, he is also amongst the highest-grossing actors (Note: For all roles, including voice acting and cameos.) as of 2024.

Welker voiced Fred Jones from the Scooby-Doo franchise since its inception in 1969 and later Scooby-Doo himself since 2002. In 2020, Welker reprised the latter role in the animated film Scoob!, the only original voice actor from the series in the film's cast. Besides Scooby-Doo, he voiced Megatron, Soundwave and several characters in the Transformers franchise. Aside from those, he also voiced Garfield from the Garfield franchise since 2007, as well as several characters and creatures in Matt Groening's animated sci-fi sitcom Futurama, including Nibbler. In 2016, he received a Lifetime Achievement Emmy Award. He was nominated for the Children's and Family Emmy Award for Outstanding Voice Performance in an Animated Program in 2022.

== Early life ==
Franklin Wendell Welker was born on March 12, 1946, in Denver, Colorado. His parents were Merrill Welker, a mining engineer, and Lillian.

He moved to California and attended Santa Monica College in Santa Monica, California, where he majored in theatrical arts. In 1966, he received honors for his performance as the Cowardly Lion in the college's theater production of The Wizard of Oz.

== Career ==
=== Voice acting ===
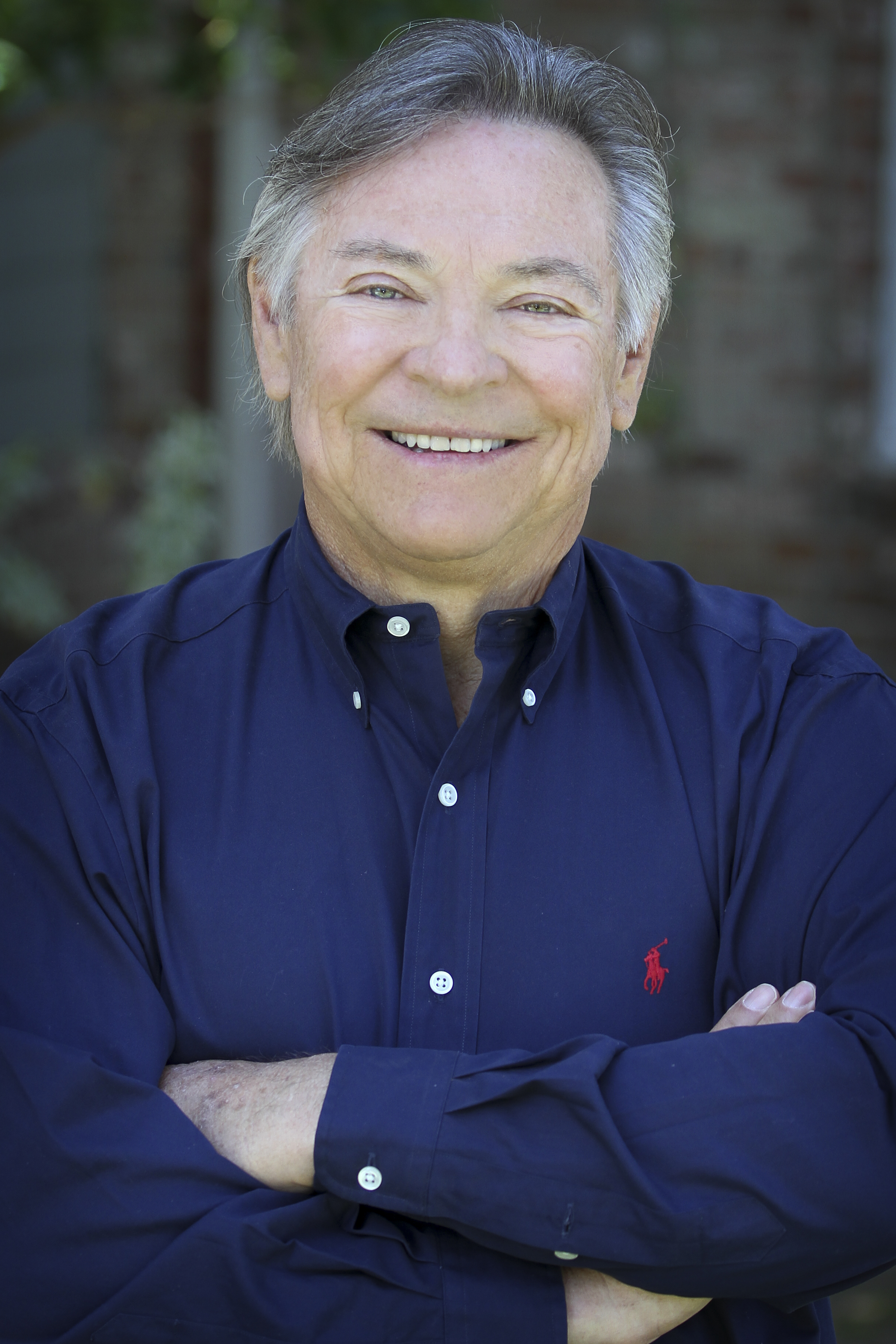
Welker in 2016

Welker began his career as a stand-up comedian and impressionist in 1967, before transitioning to on-screen acting and later voice acting. His first voice-over role was in a commercial for Friskies cat food. The producer's girlfriend recommended he audition for Hanna-Barbera during the casting of Scooby-Doo, Where Are You!. Welker initially auditioned for the titular character (and, according to Casey Kasem, the role of Shaggy Rogers, as well) but instead won the role of Fred Jones in 1969. Welker has voiced Fred in almost every series and incarnation of the Scooby-Doo animated franchise (with the exceptions of A Pup Named Scooby-Doo, Scoob!, and Velma, the latter in which he portrayed Fred's father). Welker is the only original voice actor still in the Scooby-Doo franchise.

His next major character voice was for Wonder Dog (who was inspired by Scooby-Doo) and Marvin White on the 1973 series Super Friends (also produced by Hanna-Barbera). That same year, he played Pudge and Gabby on DePatie-Freleng Enterprises' animated series Bailey's Comets. Welker continued to provide voices for many characters for Hanna-Barbera for several years, which include Jabberjaw, Dynomutt, Dog Wonder, and the Shmoo in The New Fred and Barney Show and its spin-off, The Flintstones Comedy Show. Welker described the voice he used for the Shmoo as "a bubble voice" (one he later used for Gogo Dodo in Tiny Toon Adventures).

In 1978, he played the title character on Fangface and later in its spin-off, Fangface and Fangpuss. Between 1979 and 1982, he worked for Filmation, providing the voices of Heckle and Jeckle, Quacula and Theodore H. Bear on The New Adventures of Mighty Mouse and Heckle & Jeckle; Spike, Tyke, Tuffy, Droopy, Slick Wolf and Barney Bear on The Tom and Jerry Comedy Show; Willy, Sipe, Poco and Sportikus XI on Sport Billy; various characters on Tarzan, Lord of the Jungle, Fat Albert and the Cosby Kids and The New Adventures of the Lone Ranger; and Rif, Burble and Gossamear on Blackstar.

During the 1980s and 1990s, Welker became a very busy voice actor, providing the voice for many popular cartoon characters in multiple TV series, including Uni on Dungeons & Dragons; Brain, Doctor Claw, and M.A.D. Cat on Inspector Gadget; Mister Mxyzptlk, Darkseid, and Kalibak on Super Friends: The Legendary Super Powers Show; Iceman and various characters on Spider-Man and His Amazing Friends; Baby Kermit, Baby Beaker and various other characters on Muppet Babies; Wild Bill, Dreadnok Torch, and various G.I. Joe heroes and villains; Scooter on Challenge of the GoBots; Ray Stantz and Slimer in The Real Ghostbusters; the villainous Dr. Jeremiah Surd on The Real Adventures of Jonny Quest; Bubba the Caveduck and two of the Beagle Boys (Bigtime and Baggie) on DuckTales; multiple voices on The Smurfs, including Hefty Smurf, Poet Smurf, and Peewit; and various characters on Captain Planet and the Planeteers.

He also voiced various characters on The Simpsons, such as Santa's Little Helper, Snowball II, and various other animals from 1991 to his departure from the show in 2002. Welker provided both the speaking voice and animal sounds for Nibbler on Matt Groening's Futurama. He provided the voices for Mr. Plotz, Runt, Ralph the Guard, Buttons, and other characters on Animaniacs; Gogo Dodo, Furrball, Calamity Coyote, Little Beeper, and others on Tiny Toon Adventures; Hector the Bulldog on The Sylvester & Tweety Mysteries, and Tom Cat, Jerry Mouse, and McWolf, the main antagonist to Droopy and his nephew Dripple on Tom & Jerry Kids and Droopy, Master Detective.

He also voiced Gus Goose, Salty the Seal, Figaro, Pegasus from Hercules, Abu from Aladdin, "Aracuan Bird" & Cri-Kee from Mulan in the House of Mouse from 2001 to 2003.

Welker has also created the vocal effects for many animals and creatures in films, including Abu the monkey, Rajah the tiger, and the Cave of Wonders in Aladdin (1992), its two sequels, the television series, and the remake (2019), Arnold the Pig in the television film Return to Green Acres (1990), the whales in Free Willy 2: The Adventure Home, Shao Kahn and Reptile in the Mortal Kombat movie (1995), the Martians in Tim Burton's Mars Attacks! (1996), and the penguins in Mr. Popper's Penguins (2011). He performed Spock's screams in Star Trek III: The Search for Spock (1984) and voiced The Thing in The Golden Child (1986), Jinx the robot in SpaceCamp (1986), Totoro in the 2005 English version of Studio Ghibli's film My Neighbor Totoro (1988), Alien Sil in Species (1995), Malebolgia in Spawn (1997), and Gargamel's cat Azrael in Sony Pictures Animation's live action/animated film versions of The Smurfs.

In 2006, he began voicing George in the popular children's series Curious George. He also voiced George in the animated film of the same name that same year. In 2007, Welker became the new voice of Garfield, following Bill Murray's departure from the role. He voiced the titular character in Garfield Gets Real (2007), Garfield's Fun Fest (2008), Garfield's Pet Force (2009), and on the series The Garfield Show, which ran from 2008 to 2016. In 2011, he provided the voice of Batman in a Scooby-Doo crossover segment of the Batman: The Brave and the Bold episode, "Bat-Mite Presents: Batman's Strangest Cases!". In the same episode, he also voiced Batboy, the classic Mad Magazine Batman spoof, originally created by Wally Wood.

Welker did the meowing of Puss in Boots, including in Shrek 2.

Welker has also provided voices for many video game characters, most notably Disney's Oswald the Lucky Rabbit and The Shadow Blot in Epic Mickey and its sequel Epic Mickey 2: The Power of Two, as well as Zurvan, also called the Ancient One, on StarCraft II: Heart of the Swarm. He also provided the voice of the mad mage Xzar for the Baldur's Gate video game series, and reprised his role from Avengers Assemble as Odin for Lego Marvel's Avengers.

In 2016, Welker received a Lifetime Achievement Emmy Award at the 43rd Daytime Creative Arts Emmy Awards.

=== Live-action acting ===
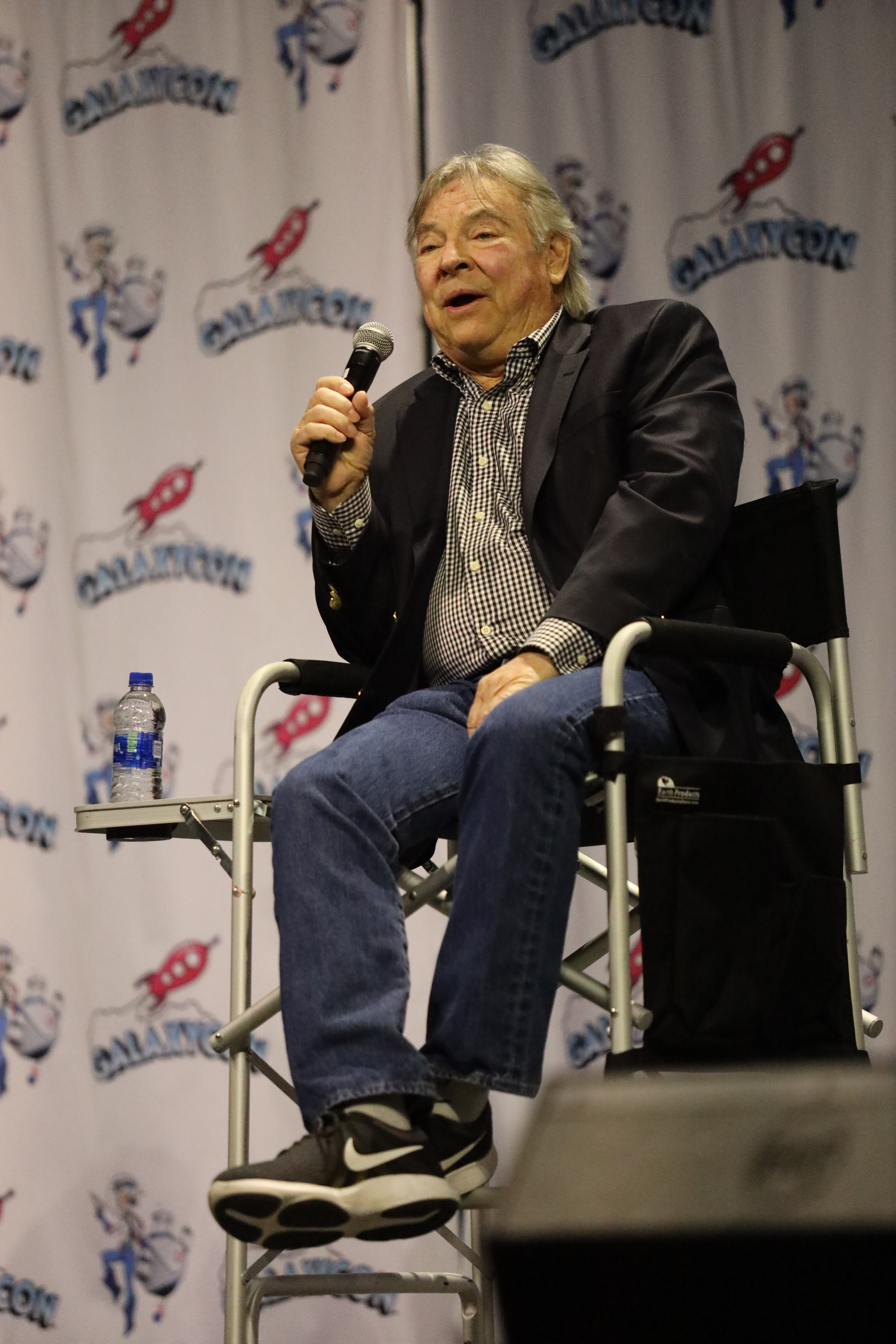
Welker at GalaxyCon 2020

Welker's first on-camera film role was as a college kid from Rutgers University who befriends Elvis Presley in The Trouble with Girls (1969). His next film role was in the Disney film The Computer Wore Tennis Shoes (1969), which starred Kurt Russell (he also appeared in the film's sequel, Now You See Him, Now You Don't, in 1972). He later co-starred with Don Knotts in Universal's How to Frame a Figg (1971), appeared in Dirty Little Billy (1972), and on The Paul Lynde Show (1972).

On-camera television appearances included roles on Laugh-In, Love, American Style, The Partridge Family, and The Don Knotts Show. He played a prosecutor in the highly acclaimed ABC special The Trial of General Yamashita and as Captain Pace beside Richard Dreyfuss' Yossarian in Paramount Television's pilot Catch-22. He also appeared on Rowan & Martin's Laugh-In, The Mike Douglas Show, The Tonight Show, The Merv Griffin Show, The Smothers Brothers Show, The Burns and Schreiber Comedy Hour, Laugh Trax, and as one of the cast members in the special of That Was the Year That Was (1985) with David Frost.

Welker also played an on-camera role as a voice actor in a 1984 episode of Simon & Simon. In The Duck Factory, he played a rival actor trying to steal the role of Dippy Duck from fellow voice actor Wally Wooster (Don Messick). In later years, he appeared in Steven Soderbergh's film The Informant! (2009) as Matt Damon's father.

In 1978, Welker appeared on The Dean Martin Celebrity Roast to George Burns. While saluting Burns, he showed his abilities as an impressionist by honoring George Burns with the voices of Walter Cronkite, Henry Kissinger, Muhammad Ali, David Frost, and Jimmy Carter. In 1987, he performed stand-up comedy on an episode of the short lived TV show Keep On Cruisin'.

=== Transformers ===
In the 1980s, Welker voiced many recurring characters in the original Transformers animated series. He voiced several Decepticons, including the leader Megatron, Soundwave, Skywarp, Mixmaster, Rumble, Wheelie, Frenzy, Ravage, and Ratbat, as well as Autobots Mirage, Trailbreaker, and Sludge. He took on the role of Wheelie in The Transformers: The Movie (1986), and in the post-movie episodes took over the role of Galvatron (from his Star Trek III castmate Leonard Nimoy) and also voiced Chromedome and Pinpointer.

In 2010, Welker reprised the roles of Megatron and Soundwave in the series Transformers: Prime (retitled Transformers: Prime – Beast Hunters for its third season) and the Transformers: Generation 1 video game Transformers: Devastation. In Prime, Welker significantly altered Megatron's voice from his Generation 1 portrayal to sound more sinister. In the 2015 follow-up series Transformers: Robots in Disguise, Welker once again reprised his role as Soundwave, who has broken his vow of silence since the events of Prime.

Welker returned to two of his Transformers roles when he portrayed Megatron and Soundwave as part of a spoof in a third-season episode of Robot Chicken, which aired shortly after the release of the first installment of the live-action film series. In the second installment film, Transformers: Revenge of the Fallen (2009), he joined the voice cast and reprised the roles of Soundwave and Ravage, and also provided the voices for Grindor, Devastator, and Reedman. He again reprised his role as Soundwave, and took on the roles of Shockwave and Barricade, in the third film, Transformers: Dark of the Moon (2011). In Transformers: Age of Extinction (2014), he reprised his role as Galvatron, albeit with a voice similar to his portrayal of Megatron in Transformers: Prime.

Welker does not voice Megatron in the first three live-action films (Hugo Weaving was chosen for the role instead). However, he did voice Megatron in the two video games based on the first two films, as well as the theme park attractions at Universal Studios Singapore, Universal Studios Hollywood, and Universal Studios Florida, Transformers: The Ride. In the fifth installment of the film series, Transformers: The Last Knight (2017), he finally reprised the voice of Megatron, once again utilizing his Transformers: Prime version of the character's voice.

As of 2019, Welker continues to occasionally voice Megatron for various Transformers media, alternating between his Generation 1 and Prime portrayals.

== Personal life ==
Welker says he has dated actresses Pamela Sue Martin and Teresa Ganzel, the latter his co-star in Tom & Jerry Kids and Droopy, Master Detective. He was longtime friends with Peter Cullen, his Transformers co-star. Welker wrote a tribute on his personal webpage after Cullen's death in 2026.

A licensed pilot since 2010, Welker flies a Beechcraft Bonanza B36T from a local general aviation airport in Los Angeles County, California.

== Notes ==
Preceded by None	Voice of Fred Jones; 1969–present	Succeeded by None
Preceded by Don Messick	Voice of Scooby-Doo; 1979, 2002–present	Succeeded by None
Preceded by Lorenzo Music	Voice of Garfield; 2007-present	Succeeded by None
