= DreamRift =

American independent video game developer

- Type: Private
- Industry: Video games
- Founded: 2009; 17 years ago
- Fate: Dormant
- Headquarters: Orlando, Florida, U.S.
- Key people: Peter Ong (Creative Director); Ryan Pijai (Technical Director)
- Products: Monster Tale; Epic Mickey: Power of Illusion
- Website: http://www.dreamrift.com

DreamRift is an American independent video game developer based in Orlando, Florida, founded in 2009. They have developed two video games for Nintendo's handheld systems, Nintendo DS and Nintendo 3DS: Monster Tale and Epic Mickey: Power of Illusion.

== Overview ==
Founded in 2009 by Peter Ong and Ryan Pijai, DreamRift is an independent videogame company that has developed games with major publishers including Disney Interactive Studios and Majesco. Its first project was announced in November 2009 under the working title of Project Monster.

In an interview with Peter Ong, Dreamrift's co-founder and Creative Director, Destructoid asked about the inception of the project and company:

There's a lot of experience on the team, but DreamRift is a new studio, and you guys are coming out of the gate with a new IP here. I'd imagine that would be both challenging and scary.

Ong responded by saying:

It was definitely challenging, and we were aware that taking other routes such as doing licensed games or ports of existing games to different platforms would be safer. Although, many of us have experience making some very successful licensed titles in the past, we felt strongly that for our first game as an independent studio, we wanted to tap into our passion for creating new universes, characters, and innovative gameplay mechanics.

Project Monster evolved into the company's first game, titled Monster Tale, and was selected for publishing by Majesco.

Monster Tale was released on March 22, 2011, to highly favorable reviews, and was found to have one of the highest Metacritic ratings of an original IP released that year for the Nintendo DS.

In 2011, DreamRift transitioned to the Nintendo 3DS and began working on a top-secret project; the project was confirmed by IGN in March 2012 to be Epic Mickey: Power of Illusion, developed in collaboration with Disney Interactive Studios.

Following the news of DreamRift's involvement with Epic Mickey: Power of Illusion, first details revealed that the game was not only a new game within the Epic Mickey series, but also a sequel to the classic 1990 Mega Drive/Genesis videogame, Castle of Illusion. Penny Arcade reported at a press event in Anaheim that "Epic Mickey: Power of Illusion is a faithful spiritual successor to the Genesis game".

According to Siliconera, Epic Mickey: Power of Illusion is the first full-retail third-party Nintendo 3DS game to be released on the Nintendo eShop in addition to releasing in stores on November 18, 2012.

In October 2012, Nintendojo reported that Dreamrift is interested in returning to its Monster Tale series.

On November 8, 2012, Australian Video Game Website, vooks.net, reported that Dreamrift has begun work on another unannounced project.

In the April 2015 issue of Nintendo Force, the magazine revealed Monster Tale Ultimate, a remake of the original Monster Tale game for the Nintendo 3DS.

== Games ==
- 2011 - Monster Tale, Majesco (Nintendo DS)
- 2012 - Epic Mickey: Power of Illusion, Disney Interactive Studios (Nintendo 3DS)

== Website Closure ==
As of May 16, 2019, http://www.dreamrift.com no longer acts as DreamRift's website.
