= Pet Force =

Book series by Jim Davis

The cover of the first book, The Outrageous Origin.

Pet Force is a series of books for young readers. It is a spin-off of Garfield, in which the main animal characters of the comic series are portrayed as comic book superheroes. The action takes place on planet Polyester.

20th Century Fox released an animated direct-to-video film based on the series, Garfield's Pet Force, in 2009.

== Story ==
In another universe that exists parallel to Garfield's own, a team of five superheroes known as "Pet Force" serve Emperor Jon as protectors of his throne. Ruling the galaxy from the planet Polyester, Jon's reign is constantly opposed by the evil Vetvix. When Vetvix uses a new weapon to strip Pet Force of their powers and send them to a ghostly dimension where they will be trapped forever, Jon is forced to have his right-hand man, Sorcerer Binky, use a dimensional portal to find five alternate versions of the heroes to take their place. In Garfield's universe, Pet Force is a best-selling comic book, and when Nermal buys the limited-edition 100th issue, it becomes a portal through which they are pulled into the alternate universe, becoming the new Pet Force. Although they return to their own universe after the initial adventure, they subsequently return to fight Vetvix and other evils when needed.

== Books ==
- Book #1: The Outrageous Origin (1998)
- Book #2: Pie-Rat's Revenge (1998)
- Book #3: K-Niner: Dog of Doom (1998)
- Book #4: Menace of the Mutanator (1998)
- Book #5: Attack of the Lethal Lizards (1999)

The story was later continued within several Pet Force comic stories featured in the Boom! Studios Garfield comic books.
