= The Mad Doctor (1933 film) =

1933 film by David Hand

- Title card
- Directed by: David Hand
- Produced by: Walt Disney
- Starring: Walt Disney; Allan Watson; Pinto Colvig
- Music by: Bert Lewis
- Color process: Black and white
- Production company: Walt Disney Productions
- Distributed by: United Artists
- Release date: January 20, 1933
- Running time: 7 minutes
- Country: United States
- Language: English

The Mad Doctor is a 1933 American animated short film directed by David Hand. It is known as the first appearance of the titular character, additionally known as "Doctor XXX". It is the 52nd film Mickey Mouse short film and the second of that year. This cartoon is one of the rare Disney-produced cartoons to enter the public domain early due to its copyright renewal being neglected.

== Plot ==
The full short.

A mad scientist who has kidnapped Mickey's dog, Pluto. Mickey tries to rescue him before the doctor can perform his experiment: attaching Pluto's head onto the body of a chicken in order to ascertain what noise the potential hatchling will make. Mickey battles his way through booby traps and animated skeletons before eventually getting caught and strapped onto a table to be cut in half by a circular saw, forcing Mickey to suck in his belly as he trembles. The scene then fades to Mickey asleep in bed and suddenly woken up by a fly, whose buzzing is akin to the whirring of the saw. Not yet realizing the events were only a nightmare, Mickey shouts for Pluto, who eagerly jumps onto Mickey's bed with his doghouse and chain still attached to his collar.

== Voice cast ==
- Mickey Mouse: Walt Disney
- Pluto: Pinto Colvig
- Hen: Florence Gill
- The Mad Doctor: Allan Watson

== Reception ==
The short's horror elements made it unusual for a Mickey Mouse cartoon. Some theaters refused to show it, believing it to be too scary for children. At one time, for this reason, it was banned entirely in the United Kingdom, as well as Nazi Germany. Due to the perceived scariness, the short was never reissued.

In February 1933, The Film Daily said: "One of the liveliest animated cartoons to come along, and plenty comical."

=== Later analysis ===
Further study of the short suggests that it serves as a spoof of Universal's Horror films of the time, in particular Frankenstein and the horror genre more broadly. Other analysis purports that the short is an examination of "the machine age and its discontents" as Mickey encounters the "horror of science technology" when facing The Mad Doctor. The short is also indicative of the evolution of Mickey's character from a more mischievous one to an "innocuous hero, devoid of obvious desire and aggression" as the character selflessly attempts rescuing Pluto. To this end, Mickey is only allowed to engage in the "surreal and absurd situations" that the short portrays by having the ending reveal that it was all a dream. The short also features the horror elements similar to the 1896 novel The Island of Doctor Moreau with The Mad Doctor's plan of turning Pluto into a dog/chicken hybrid in a similar way to how the hybrid beings were created in the novel.

== Legacy ==
A photo of the Mad Doctor can be seen on a hospital wall during the Roger Rabbit short Tummy Trouble. In 1988, a cel from the short featuring Mickey looking down "a staircase of skeletons and included the background scenery" sold at an auction for $63,800. In 1992, more artwork from the short was sold at auction for $18,700.

=== Video games ===
The Mad Doctor short also served as the basis for, and title of, the second level in the video game, Mickey Mania: The Timeless Adventures of Mickey Mouse. A depiction of the Mad Doctor is additionally used as the cover art for the game and the Mad Doctor is a boss that Mickey must defeat. He additionally appears as a major character in Epic Mickey and its sequel; the cartoon appears as a bonus in the first game. The video game Kingdom Hearts III features a Game & Watch style mini-game based on the short.

== Home media ==
The short was released on December 2, 2002 on Walt Disney Treasures: Mickey Mouse in Black and White.

== See also ==
- Mickey Mouse (film series)
- List of animated films in the public domain in the United States
