= Monster Tale =

2011 video game

- Developer: DreamRift
- Publisher: Majesco
- Director: Peter Ong
- Platform: Nintendo DS
- Release: NA: March 22, 2011
- Genres: Action-adventure; Life simulation, Metroidvania
- Mode: Single-player

Monster Tale is a 2011 platformer video game developed by DreamRift and published by Majesco for the Nintendo DS. It follows a young girl named Ellie and her monster companion Chomp as they attempt to stop the villainous Kid-Kings and return Monster World to the monsters.

== Development ==
According to the game's developers, there was pressure from publishers not to feature a young female lead. Peter Ong, the co-founder of DreamRift and director of Monster Tale, told Nintendo Power that "this choice was actually somewhat controversial with some publishers. Our experience was that many publishers are looking to avert the risk of a main character that hasn't been proven to capture large audiences. As a result, there was some concern from publishers that Ellie should change to a male or a more mature/sexy female."

== Reception ==
Reception

Aggregate score
Aggregator	Score
Metacritic	79/100

Review scores
Publication	Score
1Up.com	B+
Destructoid	8/10
Edge	6/10
Eurogamer	7/10
GameSpot	8/10
GamesRadar+	4.5/5
IGN	8.5/10
NGamer	80%
Nintendo Power	8/10
Nintendo World Report	8/10

Monster Tale received "generally favorable reviews" according to the review aggregation website Metacritic.

== Remake ==
On March 29, 2015, DreamRift announced a remake of the game, titled Monster Tale Ultimate, to be released for Nintendo 3DS via the Nintendo eShop. Announced changes to Ultimate included reduced backtracking, visual improvements, and the ability to toggle between the original soundtrack and a new orchestral soundtrack. However, Monster Tale Ultimate was never released. In January 2021, Majesco announced that Monster Tale would be released on "modern game platforms".
