= Epic Mickey: Power of Illusion =

2012 video game

- North American cover art
- Developer: DreamRift
- Publisher: Disney Interactive Studios
- Director: Peter Ong
- Designers: Ara Shirinian; Mark Vargas; Jason Behr
- Programmer: Ryan Pijai
- Artist: Michael Veroni
- Writers: Peter Ong; Mark Vargas
- Composers: Sean Beeson; James Dooley
- Platform: Nintendo 3DS
- Release: NA: November 18, 2012; AU: November 22, 2012; EU: November 23, 2012
- Genre: Platform
- Mode: Single-player

Epic Mickey: Power of Illusion is a 2012 platform game developed by DreamRift and published by Disney Interactive Studios for the Nintendo 3DS. It is the third part of the Epic Mickey series, released alongside Epic Mickey 2: The Power of Two, and is touted as a tribute to Sega's Illusion series of Mickey Mouse games, particularly Castle of Illusion Starring Mickey Mouse.

== Gameplay ==
With players taking control of Mickey Mouse, the game mixes side-scrolling gameplay from games such as Castle of Illusion with the paint and thinner mechanics from Epic Mickey. Using the 3DS touch-screen, the player is able to bring items scattered throughout each stage into existence. How well the player traces these items affect their performance; tracing a cannon perfectly will ensure that it only harms enemies, while an imperfect one could be a danger to everyone in the area (including Mickey).

== Plot ==
Some time after the first two games, Mickey is contacted once more by Oswald; he says that a strange castle has appeared in Wasteland and that he saw Minnie trapped inside. Mickey sneaks into Yen Sid's study and takes the magic brush once more before jumping into the portal to Wasteland in his television. However, Minnie arrives shortly afterwards, looking for Mickey.

Meeting up with Oswald, Mickey examines the castle, remembering it as the Castle of Illusion ruled by the evil witch Mizrabel. They end up trapped inside, deciding to split up. Mickey meets Jiminy Cricket, who acts as his guide through the castle. Mickey comes face to face with Mizrabel, who now looks like Maleficent, taunting him to try saving the characters she trapped. Mickey reaches a safe haven, which Jiminy calls the Fortress. Oswald arrives and explains that Mizrabel is draining the paint of popular characters, hoping to use their accumulated Heart Power to escape Wasteland. Mickey sets out to save the characters; however, Mizrabel impedes his path with her ghoulish army. When enough Heart Power is accumulated from rescuing characters, it breaks the witch's illusions, revealing new areas of the castle.

Mickey fights his way through the east hall, which Mizrabel's illusionary magic has made look like London and Neverland. He comes across a copy of the Jolly Roger, where Captain Hook confronts him. Having been put under a spell by Mizrabel, Hook thinks Mickey is an enemy working for Peter Pan. Mickey defeats him and breaks the trance, sending Hook to the Fortress with the promise of not harming the other characters.

After Mickey's fight through the west hall, which looked like Agrabah and the Cave of Wonders, he arrives in a replica of the Sultan's room. Inside, Jafar has captured Jasmine and awaits Mickey. Jafar says that Mizrabel has made him the most powerful sorcerer in the world, and that she warned him that Mickey would arrive. Jafar turns into a giant cobra to attack, but is swiftly defeated. Jafar then realises that Mizrabel lied to him and agrees to go to Fortress to await being returned home.

Mickey fights his way through the southern hall, which looks like Atlantica and the shore by Prince Eric's castle, ending up in Mizrabel's chambers. The room is a replica of the Forbidden Mountain, Maleficent's home. Mizrabel turns into Dragon Maleficent to fight Mickey, but he defeats her and frees Minnie, forcing Mizrabel to escape. In the core of the Fortress, Mickey and Oswald send everyone back home, imparting advice to both the heroes and the villains. When Mickey returns home, he tries telling Minnie about his adventure, but finds that she knows about them as a dream since her paint was in the Castle of Illusion as well, much to his shock.

== Development ==
Rumors began to circulate about a new game in the Epic Mickey series titled Epic Mickey: Power of Illusion coming to the Nintendo 3DS in March 2012, after a member of the official French Nintendo magazine leaked the game's title onto Twitter. The game was in development for Nintendo 3DS. Each stage in Power of Illusion was based on a different Disney animated feature, including Peter Pan, Beauty and the Beast and Tangled. The Power of Illusion uses hand-drawn sprites and scrolling parallax backgrounds, according to developer Warren Spector.

On the Epic Mickey Facebook page, fans were asked to vote for their preferred cover art for the game. One features Mickey Mouse surrounded by several Disney villains like Jafar, Ursula, Captain Hook, and The Queen of Hearts; the other only features Mickey Mouse while the villains are absent. After a vote, the first cover (featuring the villains) was chosen as the final cover for the game.

== Release ==
Epic Mickey: Power of Illusion was released alongside Epic Mickey 2: The Power of Two on November 18, 2012. The game is one of the first third-party retail titles outside Japan to be available as a Nintendo eShop downloadable, and the first to be available digitally simultaneously as the retail version. In Japan, the game was named Epic Mickey: Mickey's Marvelous Adventure (ディズニー エピックミッキー ミッキーのふしぎな冒険, Dizunī epikkumikkī mikkī no fushigina bōken). The Japanese version was published by Spike Chunsoft alongside its home console companion.

== Reception ==
Reception

Aggregate scores
Aggregator	Score
GameRankings	64.70%
Metacritic	63/100

Review scores
Publication	Score
1Up.com	C
Destructoid	6/10
Eurogamer	4/10
Famitsu	31/40
Game Informer	5/10
GameSpot	8/10
GamesRadar+	3.5/5
IGN	7/10
Joystiq	3.5/5
Nintendo Life	4/10
Nintendo World Report	7.5/10
Official Nintendo Magazine	60%

Epic Mickey: Power of Illusion received "mixed or average" reviews from critics, according to the review aggregation website Metacritic. GameTrailers gave the game a score of 7/10, praising some unique ideas and presentation, but criticising slow gameplay mechanics and copious amounts of backtracking. IGN also gave it a 7/10. Destructoid gave it a 6/10, stating: "The building blocks of the ultimate Mickey Mouse game are here, but we'll have to wait yet another day to see that vision become reality". Eurogamer gave a highly critical review, saying that "Power of Illusion is unlikely to entertain fans of the Mega Drive game beyond the initial buzz of nostalgia, and kids of today won't fancy trekking all the way back through the Neverland jungle to find Wendy's needle when they could be watching the Power Rangers kick space robots to death". However, GameSpot gave a positive review, stating that Power of Illusion is "Mickey's best adventure in years", awarding the game an 8/10.
