= Garfield's Pet Force =

2009 animated film directed by Mark A.Z. Dippé

- DVD cover
- Directed by: Mark A.Z. Dippé; Kyung Ho Lee
- Written by: Jim Davis
- Based on: Garfield by Jim Davis
- Produced by: Daniel Chuba; John Davis; Ash R. Shah
- Starring: Frank Welker; Gregg Berger; Audrey Wasilewski; Jason Marsden; Wally Wingert; Vanessa Marshall
- Edited by: Rob Neal; Tom Sanders
- Music by: Kenneth Burgomaster
- Production companies: Paws, Inc. The Animation Picture Company; Davis Entertainment
- Distributed by: 20th Century Fox Home Entertainment (United States/Canada)
- Release date: June 16, 2009
- Running time: 78 minutes
- Country: United States
- Language: English
- Box office: $11.4 million

Garfield's Pet Force is a 2009 American animated superhero comedy film based on characters from the Jim Davis comic strip Garfield and loosely based on the Pet Force novel series. It is the third installment of the animated movie series, following Garfield Gets Real and Garfield's Fun Fest. Also, it is the fifth Garfield movie overall. It was released on DVD and Blu-ray Disc in the United States on June 16, 2009, by 20th Century Fox Home Entertainment, while it was pre-sold overseas by sales representative Velvet Octopus. It was written by Garfield creator Jim Davis. It was released theatrically in 3-D in select countries such as Japan, Poland, Italy, Mexico, Brazil, Australia, Spain, and the UK. The film was the most profitable film in the franchise until 2024. It is the last Garfield film to be distributed by 20th Century Fox (who lost the film and television rights to the Garfield franchise shortly after the film's release), a decade prior to Nickelodeon's acquisition of Paws, Inc. in August 2019. A sixth film, The Garfield Movie, was released in May 2024. It was distributed by Sony Pictures Releasing under their Columbia Pictures label.

== Plot ==
On the planet Dorkon, Professor Wally shows Emperor Jon his new invention, the Moscram ray gun, a device powered by the Klopman crystal that can scramble inanimate objects and organisms into new creatures under the user's control, but the Emperor is more concerned about finding a wife to continue the royal line. Soon a warship led by Vetvix lands outside the palace and Emperor Jon instantly falls in love with her, asking if he can marry her. She agrees, sensing an opportunity to steal the Moscram. Professor Wally summons the Pet Force against her: Garzooka, Odious, Abnermal, and Starlena, but Vetvix zombifies the Pet Force except Garzooka. Garzooka takes the Klopman and escapes with the Professor. The professor finds counterparts with DNA matches with the Pet Force and gives Garzooka red and green serums that will transform them into the Pet Force (green to transform them into Pet Force, red to turn them back to their normal forms), who then takes off to the Comic World leaving Professor Wally & Vetvix behind.

The situation was revealed to be a comic book Nermal was reading. Garfield's friends go to the Comic Studios without him. Nermal gets the new Pet Force issue on the way, and Garzooka jumps out of it. Nermal finds that the events that are happening to them are in the comic book, and the rest of the book is blank because they have not happened yet. Garzooka heads for Jon's house, and is told where Odie, Arlene, and Nermal are by Garfield. Garzooka gives Garfield the Klopman.

At the Comic Studios, Nermal, Arlene, and Odie notice Garzooka behind them after Nermal sees this in his comic book. Garzooka gives them the serums, but they don’t seem to work. However, it is time for Odie, Arlene, and Nermal to go to work and Garzooka follows. Vetvix captures the real Garfield, mistaking him for Garzooka, and takes the Klopman. Garfield escapes.

Back at Comic Studios, the gang is interrupted by Vetvix, who zombifies most of the characters at the studio with the Moscram. Nermal, Odie, Arlene, Jon, and Garzooka escape and meet up with Garfield. Nermal, Odie, and Arlene's serums finally transform them into their Pet Force counterparts. Garzooka and his team then go off to fight Vetvix, and head technician Eli saves Garfield, but Jon gets zombified. Vetvix zombifies all of Toon World. Eli and Garfield find survivors: inventor Wally, Bonita, and assistant director Betty. Zombies break into the tower, making the Pet Force escape to the top. Garfield and Wally trap the zombies. The real Garzooka and the Pet Force head to the antenna and use it as a harpoon to bring down Vetvix's ship, but Vetvix scrambles the Pet Force and creates a monster made from the town's buildings.

Emperor Jon and Professor Wally break free, and take over the ship, flying into the air, making Vetvix fall off. Professor Wally and Emperor Jon land near the Comic Studio and let Garfield enter the ship. Garfield seizes control of the Moscram, dezombifies the Pet Force, and destroys the monster. Upon returning to the studio, Garfield uses the Moscram to combine Vetvix with a happiness invention, turning her into a good guy. Eli opens the pit so Garfield can use the Moscram to reverse the zombifications on everyone else. Vetvix sees Emperor Jon and apologizes to him for her behavior and accepts the emperor's marriage proposal for real this time. Arlene, Odie and Nermal return to their original forms. Garzooka gives Nermal an Abnermal cosplay costume before leaving with Vetvix, Emperor Jon, and Professor Wally, the latter vowing to destroy the Moscram after reversing the damage done on Dorkon.

After the Pet Force cast returns to Dorkon, the Toon World residents start to watch Emperor Jon and Vetvix's wedding before rebuilding their civilization. That evening, Garfield and Arlene have a heart to heart where Garfield decides to stop missing out on life so much and the two of them take off to the stars for a dance.

During the mid credits, while watching Emperor Jon's wedding, not only does Jon notice the real Pet Force in attendance, the gang see that Betty has stowed away on the ship to follow Garzooka, whom she had a crush on, much to the shock of Charles. Arlene points out that Charles now needs a new assistant, a position Nermal is probably eager to take.

== Cast ==
- Frank Welker as Garfield / Garzooka / Narrator / Monster / Additional Voices
- Gregg Berger as Odie / Odious
- Audrey Wasilewski as Arlene / Starlena
- Jason Marsden as Nermal / Abnermal
- Vanessa Marshall as Vetvix
- Wally Wingert as Jon Arbuckle / Emperor Jon
- Fred Tatasciore as Billy Bear / Horned Guard
- Greg Eagles as Eli
- Jennifer Darling as Betty / Bonita
- Stephen Stanton as Randy Rabbit / Additional Voices
- Neil Ross as Wally / Charles / Professor Wally

== Reception ==
=== Box office ===
The film opened in twenty countries. Like Garfield's Fun Fest, the film's most profitable market was Brazil, where it took in more than $2.4 million. It opened third at the box office with $609,773, and dropped 53.5% to sixth in its sophomore weekend, grossing $283,558.

=== Critical response ===
Joly Herman of Common Sense Media gave the film a 1 out of 5 star review, stating: "Kids who love Garfield are better off checking out the TV series or even the live-action movie".

== See also ==
- Pet Force
