= Epic Mickey 2: The Power of Two =

2012 video game

- Developers: Junction Point Studios; Blitz Games Studios (PS3, Wii, 360, Windows, Vita); Heavy Iron Studios (Wii U)
- Publishers: Disney Interactive Studios (PS3, 360, Wii, Wii U, Windows); Sony Computer Entertainment (Vita)
- Director: Warren Spector
- Producer: Joye Price
- Designer: Chase Jones
- Programmer: Peter Shelus
- Artist: Bernadette LaCarte
- Writers: Marv Wolfman; Brian Freyermuth
- Composers: James Dooley; Mike Himelstein
- Series: Epic Mickey
- Engine: Gamebryo
- Platforms: PlayStation 3; Wii; Wii U; Xbox 360; Windows; PlayStation Vita
- Release: PS3, Wii, Wii U, Xbox 360: NA: November 18, 2012; AU: November 22, 2012; EU: November 23, 2012; EU: November 30, 2012 (Wii U); AU: December 13, 2012 (Wii U); PlayStation Vita: NA: June 18, 2013 (PSN); EU: June 19, 2013; AU: June 19, 2013; Windows: EU: October 2013; WW: October 6, 2014
- Genres: Platform, action-adventure
- Modes: Single-player, multiplayer

Epic Mickey 2: The Power of Two is a platform game developed by Junction Point Studios and published in November 2012 by Disney Interactive Studios. It is the sequel to 2010's Epic Mickey. Unlike its Wii-only predecessor, the game was initially released on the PlayStation 3, Wii, Wii U and Xbox 360. Versions followed for the PlayStation Vita and Windows. The game includes an optional co-op mode where a second player, as Oswald the Lucky Rabbit, assists the first player, Mickey Mouse, in saving the Wasteland. The game additionally has a companion called Epic Mickey: Power of Illusion for the Nintendo 3DS. It was also the last game to be released by Junction Point Studios, as it was released two months before its closure.

== Gameplay ==
Like its predecessor, Epic Mickey 2 takes place in a world based on classic and retired Disney characters and attractions. Likewise, the gameplay in Epic Mickey 2 closely resembles that of the original. One of the biggest updates is the addition of Oswald as a supporting character for Mickey; Oswald can either be controlled by the computer or a second player. Oswald uses a remote control in a way similar to how Mickey uses his paintbrush, to attack or befriend enemy characters and to power or reprogram machines as needed to complete tasks. Oswald also has many other abilities, such as flying with his ears, taking off his leg, using his arms as boomerangs, etc. There are additionally some special abilities that can only be used when Mickey and Oswald are working together. In the PlayStation 3 version of the game, players are able to use motion controls using the PlayStation Move controller.

== Plot ==
All has been well in the Wasteland since Mickey Mouse saved it from destruction by the Shadow Blot, with the world's inhabitants beginning its restoration. However, a series of earthquakes have been occurring lately. The Mad Doctor, revealed to be still alive, arrives and claims he has reformed. He requests Oswald the Lucky Rabbit to collaborate with him in order to save Wasteland from this new threat. Not trusting the Mad Doctor, Gus, the leader of the Gremlins, and Ortensia, Oswald's wife, contact Mickey for assistance. Mickey enters Yen Sid's workshop once more and takes back the Magic Paintbrush to aid him as he returns to Wasteland. Oswald joins up with them in Dark Beauty Castle, explaining the Mad Doctor warned him of Blotworx, Blotlings piloting Beetleworx-like battle mechs. The castle begins collapsing from an earthquake, forcing them to escape while Oswald retrieves his remote en route.

Mickey and Oswald arrive in Mean Street via the train, where Gremlin Jamface advises them to fix the disabled projector travel network via their control station in Rainbow Falls. They fight their way through Wasteland to accomplish this, battling various Blotworx. After heading to the Mad Doctor's laboratory in Disney Gulch and defeating a Blotworx dragon, they find out the projectors were intentionally sabotaged, with evidence pointing to OsTown's grumpy caretaker Gremlin Prescott, whom the heroes had earlier caught assembling a secret television device. The group follow him to Fort Wasteland, an area abandoned during the Blot's revolt, and onto the Floatyard, where they find Prescott has built a gigantic battle mech modelled after himself. Confessing to the projectors' sabotage, he accuses Gus of never recognizing his potential and battles the heroes.

After trapping or destroying his creation, the group attempts to interrogate Prescott, only for Wasteland's news team and the Mad Doctor to arrive. One of the Mad Doctor's Beetleworx places Prescott in a hypnotic trance, making him publicly confess to being behind the chaos – which convinces everyone except for Mickey's group. The Mad Doctor announces he will be building a new attraction in celebration and Wasteland's inhabitants begin to accept him as their leader instead of Oswald, to his dismay.

Gus goes through Prescott's belongings and retrieves blueprints that suggest his main project was not the mech, but rather an undercover operation in Ventureland. Mickey and Oswald follow the trail through Ventureland, which leads them to Autotopia, a region that was presumed to be destroyed during the Blot's revolt. There, they witness mechanical siphons erected by Prescott pumping Wasteland's primeval spirits, the Guardians, out of the ground. These machines were disrupting the foundation of Wasteland and causing the earthquakes. After disabling them, the team discover a secret projector set up by the Mad Doctor; travelling through, they learn what happened to the Mad Doctor following his previous defeat. He crash-landed in Disney Gulch and set up his lab there, creating the Blotworx as part of a plot for revenge, but was forced to cast them out due to their hostility.

In the attic of Lonesome Manor, which has been retooled into a secret television studio, they find the Mad Doctor's diary, from which they learn of his true intentions. He manipulated Prescott into building him the television device in order to broadcast a television program, 'The Wonderful World of Evil,' into Mickey's world, to bestow upon him fame and thus a new heart, allowing him to escape Wasteland. Wanting to become a Toon again after discovering that his Beetleworx form had begun to deteriorate, the Mad Doctor schemed to capture the Guardians in Autotopia as he knew they would have the power to restore him.

Mickey and Oswald confront the Mad Doctor at his new attraction, now revealed to be a doomsday device intended to destroy Wasteland upon his departure. He demands the brush from Mickey in exchange for sparing the citizens trapped on the ride. Mickey is prepared to hand it over, but Oswald prevents the exchange at the last second. The duo then defeat the Mad Doctor, whose Beetleworx form finally gives out and is either killed or redeemed depending on which path is taken in his fight. If redeemed, the Mad Doctor saves the heroes from falling into a thinner pool and his Toon form is restored by the freed Guardians. In the aftermath, all of Wasteland celebrates Mickey and Oswald's triumph with a parade highlighting the duo's major choices throughout the game.

In a post-credits scene, the Petes of Wasteland (with Petetronic being present if the thinner path was taken) take Prescott hostage.

== Development ==
In August 2011, Destructoid posted an article that speculated that a sequel, Epic Mickey 2, was in development and showed possible box art for the game.

Game Trailers also stated that their March 22, 2012 episode would include a "world-exclusive preview of Warren Spector's new epic adventure" and that it would be "notably significant". Warren Spector himself also commented on the game's development, revealing that he had "a team of over 700 people working on the sequel". Following this, on March 20, 2012, the official French Nintendo magazine posted a comment on Twitter, revealing that Disney had plans to create a companion to the main sequel for the 3DS, under the name Epic Mickey: Power of Illusion.

Warren Spector officially confirmed the rumors, revealing the sequel's title to be Epic Mickey: Power of Two. Spector also directly addressed the camera issues that reviewers criticized in the first game, stating that "they'll be working on it until the day we ship the second game. [There have been] over 1,000 specific changes made to the camera. Our goal is that you will not have to touch the manual camera controls even once to play through the main story path of this game".

Spector also revealed that the game was to include voice acting and musical numbers, both of which were absent in the first game. Spector said: "I'm such a geek about musicals, I love the co-op and next-gen stuff, but for me, when a character breaks into song, which they do on a regular basis in this game, it's magic".

Spector also commented on the sequel's co-op features: "It's drop-in, drop-out co-op, you can sit down at any time with a friend who is playing as Mickey, and you can take control of Oswald. If you're playing as a single-player, Oswald will be there every second of the game. He's not just a multiplayer character, he's a helper, whether you're playing alone or with a friend or family member". Wasteland itself will feature old areas ruined by earthquakes and other natural disasters, as well as new areas such as Disney Gulch, based on Disneyland's Frontierland.

Twelve screenshots for the game were released in October 2012. Fans long speculated that the recently located Oswald cartoon Hungry Hobos (1928) would appear as an unlockable, but the final game included the Silly Symphony Skeleton Dance (1929) instead.

Unlike the original game, which had a limited budget and minimal voice acting, the sequel included full voice acting for all of the characters.

Epic Mickey 2: The Power of Two later received a port to Sony's PlayStation Vita platform. The Vita version was developed by Blitz Game Studios (in collaboration with Sony Computer Entertainment), which has already dealt with the PlayStation 3 and Xbox 360 version of the game. This version was optimized especially for the Vita, such that the defects of the original version were placated; in particular the frame-rate and artificial intelligence. The Vita version supports co-op online or via ad-hoc connection.

The previously canceled PC port of Epic Mickey 2 was given a limited release in Central European countries such as Poland and the Czech Republic in October 2013.

The game arrived in Japan exclusively on Nintendo's consoles (Wii and Wii U) on September 26, 2013. Nintendo 3DS sister title Power of Illusion (renamed as Mickey's Marvelous Adventure) arrived with The Power of Two on the same day in Japan. Unlike the previous title Epic Mickey, Epic Mickey 2 was published by Spike Chunsoft in Japan.

Epic Mickey 2 was made available on Steam in October 2014. The Xbox 360 version was added to the list of Xbox One Backwards Compatible titles in August 2017.

== Reception ==
Reception

Aggregate scores
Aggregator	Score
GameRankings	(Wii) 67.60% (X360) 60.80% (PS3) 57.83% (Wii U) 55.42% (Vita) 51.50%
Metacritic	(Wii) 64/100 (X360/PS3) 59/100 (Wii U/Vita) 57/100

Review scores
Publication	Score
1Up.com	C−
Destructoid	2/10
Famitsu	32/40 (Wii U)
Game Informer	5.75/10
GameSpot	5/10
GamesRadar+	2.5/5
IGN	6.2/10 (Vita); 6/10 (Console versions)
Nintendo Life	5/10 (Wii); 4/10 (Wii U)
Nintendo World Report	6.5/10
Official Nintendo Magazine	80% (Wii); 57% (Wii U)

Epic Mickey 2: The Power of Two received "mixed or average reviews", with most complaints being the game not fixing issues that were present in the original, as well as issues with Oswald's AI. Aggregating review websites GameRankings and Metacritic gave the Wii version 67.60% and 64/100, the Xbox 360 version 60.80% and 59/100 the PlayStation 3 version 57.83% and 59/100, the Wii U version 55.42% and 57/100, and the PlayStation Vita version 51.50% and 57/100.

=== Sales ===
Epic Mickey 2 was projected to sell over 2 million units worldwide. Despite heavy marketing and being released on several platforms, however, the game ultimately only sold 529,000 copies in the United States by the end of 2012, a quarter of what its predecessor sold. Following these financial losses, Disney made an official statement on January 29, 2013 that Junction Point Studios was to be closed in order to direct resources to other projects, with Warren Spector also stating that he was "in doubt" about the future of the series.

== Cancelled sequel and spin-offs ==
Epic Mickey was envisioned as a three part story by Warren Spector, but a third Epic Mickey game was never announced, and developer Junction Point Studios was closed on January 29, 2013. Spector commented on the closure that "Disney just wanted to move in a different direction. Probably the right decision for them, frankly. No regrets. I had a great time working for Disney." Epic Mickey 2 was one of the last games to be published by Disney Interactive Studios before it closed in May 2016.

In 2016, concept art was leaked of a canceled kart racer based on the Epic Mickey franchise, named Epic Disney Racers, which was to include a number of other playable characters from Disney's legacy including Scrooge McDuck and Cruella de Vil, as well as Mickey and Oswald.

A cancelled spin-off starring Donald Duck, named Epic Donald was leaked in 2022 with the concept art.
