= Epic Mickey =

2010 video game

- North American box art
- Developers: Junction Point Studios; Purple Lamp (Rebrushed)
- Publishers: Disney Interactive Studios; THQ Nordic (Note: THQ Nordic Mobile published the iOS and Android ports.) (Rebrushed)
- Director: Warren Spector
- Producers: Alex Chrisman; Adam Creighton
- Designer: Chase Jones
- Programmer: Gabe Farris
- Artist: Mark Stefanowicz
- Writers: Allen Varney; Steve Powers
- Composer: James Dooley
- Engine: Gamebryo; Unreal Engine 4 (Rebrushed)
- Platforms: Wii; Rebrushed; Nintendo Switch; PlayStation 4; PlayStation 5; Windows; Xbox One; Xbox Series X/S; Android; iOS; Nintendo Switch 2
- Release: Wii: AU/UK: November 25, 2010; EU: November 26, 2010; NA: November 30, 2010; Rebrushed: WW: September 24, 2024; Android, iOS: WW: September 16, 2026; Nintendo Switch 2: WW: October 6, 2026
- Genre: Platform
- Mode: Single-player

Epic Mickey is a 2010 platform game developed by Junction Point Studios and published by Disney Interactive Studios for the Wii. It was released in November 2010 in North America and PAL territories. The game focuses on Mickey Mouse, who accidentally damages a world created by Yen Sid for forgotten characters and concepts and must save it. The game features Oswald the Lucky Rabbit, a character created by Walt Disney and Ub Iwerks and originally owned by Universal Pictures; The Walt Disney Company gained ownership of the character in 2006. The game marks the first time that Mickey and Oswald have appeared together.

Epic Mickey was part of an effort by Disney to re-brand Mickey Mouse as a character by placing less emphasis on his pleasant, cheerful side and reintroducing the more mischievous and adventurous sides of his personality, depicting him as an epic hero. It was directed by Warren Spector, who collaborated with Walt Disney Animation Studios on the project, with help from Powerhouse Animation Studios, who made the cutscenes for the game. The game was announced in October 2009 and released in November 2010. The game received mixed-to-positive reviews from critics, who praised its visual style, unique gameplay and meta-commentary narrative, but criticized its camera and lack of true player choice. It has maintained popularity since its release, and is widely credited for re-igniting public interest in the Oswald character, as well as other minor Disney characters such as Horace Horsecollar and Clarabelle Cow. Successors to the game include Epic Mickey 2: The Power of Two and Epic Mickey: Power of Illusion.

A remake developed by Purple Lamp, titled Disney Epic Mickey: Rebrushed, was released on Nintendo Switch, PlayStation 4, PlayStation 5, Windows, Xbox One and Xbox Series X/S by THQ Nordic on September 24, 2024. A Nintendo Switch 2 port was released on October 6, 2026.

== Gameplay ==
Epic Mickey is primarily a platform game and allows players to use their own solutions for getting through the levels. Epic Mickey features a morality system similar to games like Infamous, Spider-Man: Web of Shadows and Shadow the Hedgehog. Different alliances, side-quests and power-ups are made available depending on the choices of the player. It is also possible to avoid mini-bosses if specific actions are taken. The in-game currency "E-tickets" are important to these boss fights.

The game's key feature is a magic paintbrush, which Mickey wields, that has the ability to draw or erase objects using paint and thinner. For example, obstacles can be erased from physical existence with thinner and then restored with paint or enemies can be befriended by revitalizing them with paint or destroyed completely using thinner. The two fluids have little effect on "Beetleworx" enemies, which require being taken down physically. Mickey is also able to materialize objects from sketches, which have various effects. Two of the three sketches, the watch and the television, slow down time and distract enemies, respectively. Both fluids have limited reserves, adding a strategic element to gameplay as players must compromise between making various tasks harder or easier to accomplish. However, the fluids automatically but slowly refill and power-ups that quickly replenish the fluids are available in certain areas. Mickey can additionally find collectable pins in Wasteland; most are bronze, silver or gold, but some are special, like the "Art Appreciator" or "Mean Street" pin. Another thing that is useful in the game is a type of currency called E-tickets, which can be given or discovered. They are used to buy quest items, concept art, pins, health refills or paint or thinner refills.

To travel between sections of the Wasteland, Mickey traverses 2D side-scrolling levels based on his cartoon shorts (with three being based on the Oswald shorts Trolley Troubles, Great Guns! and Oh What a Knight and two being based on Sleeping Beauty and Fantasia), such as Steamboat Willie and Clock Cleaners.

== Synopsis ==
=== Setting ===
The game is set in the Wasteland, a pen-and-paper stylized world, created in the game's narrative by the sorcerer Yen Sid, as a place for "forgotten things", namely disused or obscure Disney characters and attractions. It is physically inspired by Disneyland and appears as an intricate model in Yen Sid's workshop. However, Mickey Mouse inadvertently causes mass damage to the model, ravaging Wasteland. The world is now tormented by the Shadow Blot, a monstrous entity loosely based on the Phantom Blot, an antagonist to Mickey in the comic strips created by Floyd Gottfredson, as well as the Mad Doctor, who chose to betray Oswald and join the Blot's side in his thirst for power.

Wasteland is split into several locations based on various areas from Disneyland and other Disney theme parks. Dark Beauty Castle, located at the center of Wasteland, is based on the Disneyland Paris version of Sleeping Beauty Castle. Mean Street is based on Main Street, U.S.A., where Horace Horsecollar and Pete live, though other incarnations of the latter appear throughout the game. The Gremlin Village is inspired by Fantasyland, based primarily around It's A Small World. The attraction's iconic clock tower serves as the game's first boss encounter. Mickeyjunk Mountain is based on the Matterhorn Bobsleds and is covered in discarded Mickey Mouse toys and merchandise. It additionally contains an abandoned Beetleworx factory that Mickey must pass through on his way to Oswald. Other locations include Bog Easy, based on New Orleans Square, which is home to the Lonesome Manor, based on The Haunted Mansion, Ventureland, based on Adventureland, Tomorrow City, based on Tomorrowland, and OsTown, based on Mickey's Toontown, where Clarabelle Cow lives.

The game also features animatronic duplications of characters, three of which are counterparts of Daisy Duck, Donald Duck and Goofy. The animatronic duplications of these characters are all shown to be worn.

=== Story ===
After mysteriously awakening one night, Mickey Mouse discovers that the mirror in his bedroom is actually a portal to Yen Sid's workshop, where he finds him using a magic paintbrush to finish the creation of a world made for forgotten Disney creations, represented as a model based on Disneyland. Mickey examines the model after Yen Sid leaves and, not knowing what it actually is, starts fiddling with the brush to make a self-portrait of himself, but inadvertently causes it to become an ink-made monster. Mickey panics when this thing tries to assault him and throws thinner on it in an attempt to destroy it, but spills more paint and thinner on the model in the process. Upon seeing Yen Sid approaching, Mickey quickly tries to clean up the mess, but in his haste, spills the entire thinner bottle onto the paint spillage as he flees back to his house. The monster, having survived Mickey's attempt to destroy it, enters the model through a portal created by the paint and thinner spillage, taking the bottle of thinner with it.

After many decades of fame following the incident, what appears to be the ink-made monster from before enters Mickey's bedroom and abducts him, dragging him through Yen Sid's workshop and into the ruined world, now known as Wasteland. After waking up, Mickey finds himself strapped to a table in a huge laboratory in Dark Beauty Castle by the Mad Doctor, who plans to steal Mickey's heart while Oswald the Lucky Rabbit, the ruler of Wasteland, spies on them. However, Mickey frees himself before he can succeed and scares off the monster, now known as the Shadow Blot, with Yen Sid's magic brush, which had fallen into Wasteland during his abduction, forcing the Mad Doctor to flee through a trap door, whereas Oswald himself does the same through another way when spotted by Mickey. Gus, leader of the Gremlins, who serve as mechanics in Wasteland, suddenly arrives and guides Mickey out of Dark Beauty Castle, while additionally teaching him how to use the brush, during which he notices drips coming off of Mickey's body and assumes that he may have absorbed some of the Blot's essence. Throughout his journey, Mickey fights Blotlings, the Blot's spawn, and Beetleworx, the Mad Doctor's evil robotic creations.

After traveling through the Gremlins' village in pursuit of Oswald and confronting the clock tower of It's a Small World, now driven insane after hearing the attraction's featured song non-stop for decades, Mickey arrives at Mean Street, where Wasteland's populace mainly resides. After Oswald is located at his sanctuary within Mickeyjunk Mountain, he, despite his resentment towards Mickey for his potential involvement in the robbery of his fame, agrees to help him escape Wasteland since he still has a heart, which Wasteland's inhabitants are stripped of after being forgotten and are unable to leave the dimension without them. To do so, they attempt to use the Moonliner Rocket in Tomorrow City, only to discover that the Mad Doctor had stolen essential parts from it to use for his plot as Mickey and Gus are sent out to recover them. The duo recover the first part from the corrupted Petetronic, an incarnation of Pete based on Sark from Tron, the next from an animatronic version of Captain Hook in Tortooga based on Pirates of the Caribbean and then confront the Mad Doctor in Lonesome Manor. Upon defeating him, it is revealed that the Mad Doctor had transfigured himself into a Beetleworx in order to survive the Blot's revolt and conquer Wasteland, before he is sent flying after Gus removes the rocket's final part from his hovercraft.

Afterwards, Mickey assists Oswald in repelling an attack staged by the Shadow Blot at Mickeyjunk Mountain's summit. Once the threat is neutralized, Oswald reveals to Mickey that the Blot that he had just battled, along with all of the previously-encountered Blotlings, were only drippings of the real Blot leaking out of the giant bottle of thinner there. Oswald explains that he and Ortensia managed to seal the Blot away in the bottle many years ago, but Ortensia was blighted by the monster in the process and entered an inert state akin to petrifaction. Oswald decides that he had been too hostile towards Mickey and attempts to start over and become friends with him. Mickey suddenly becomes overwhelmed with guilt and confesses to Oswald that he was the cause of the Blot's existence and Wasteland's crisis, which causes Oswald to lose his temper and jump onto the cork sealing the bottle shut, challenging Mickey to a fight. In his rage, Oswald accidentally damages the cork, allowing the Blot to escape from its imprisonment. The monster, which has since become larger than before, captures Oswald and Gus and threatens to murder them if Mickey does not allow it to take his heart. Mickey does so as the Blot then spares the duo and proceeds to go on a rampage throughout Wasteland, using its Bloticle tendrils to drain it of its paint and increase its power before entering Mickey's world. This prompts Mickey to get rid of the Bloticles while Oswald fixes the rocket.

With the Bloticles eliminated, Mickey, Oswald and Gus attempt to use the repaired rocket to reach the Blot, but end up crashing into Dark Beauty Castle after the monster drains the rocket's paint. As a backup plan that involves using a paint-laden firework display at the castle against the Blot is formulated, the monster soon captures Oswald, Gus and Ortensia, forcing Mickey to enter its body to save them. Mickey regains his heart before he and Oswald successfully manage to vanquish the Blot with the castle's fireworks and are sent flying. Oswald and Ortensia land in Mean Street while Mickey is sent flying out of Wasteland and back to Yen Sid's workshop. In the aftermath, Wasteland begins regenerating as Oswald reunites with the restored Ortensia. As Mickey returns home, Yen Sid enchants the mirror to show Mickey the positive or negative outcomes of his major choices in Wasteland and allows him to communicate with Oswald one last time, the duo now bonding as brothers. Afterwards, Yen Sid seals the mirror to prevent Mickey from re-entering his workshop and causing any more mischief. Not long after the mirror is sealed, Mickey discovers that he still has some of the Blot's essence in him, leaving the possibility that he may still be able to reach Wasteland.

== Development ==
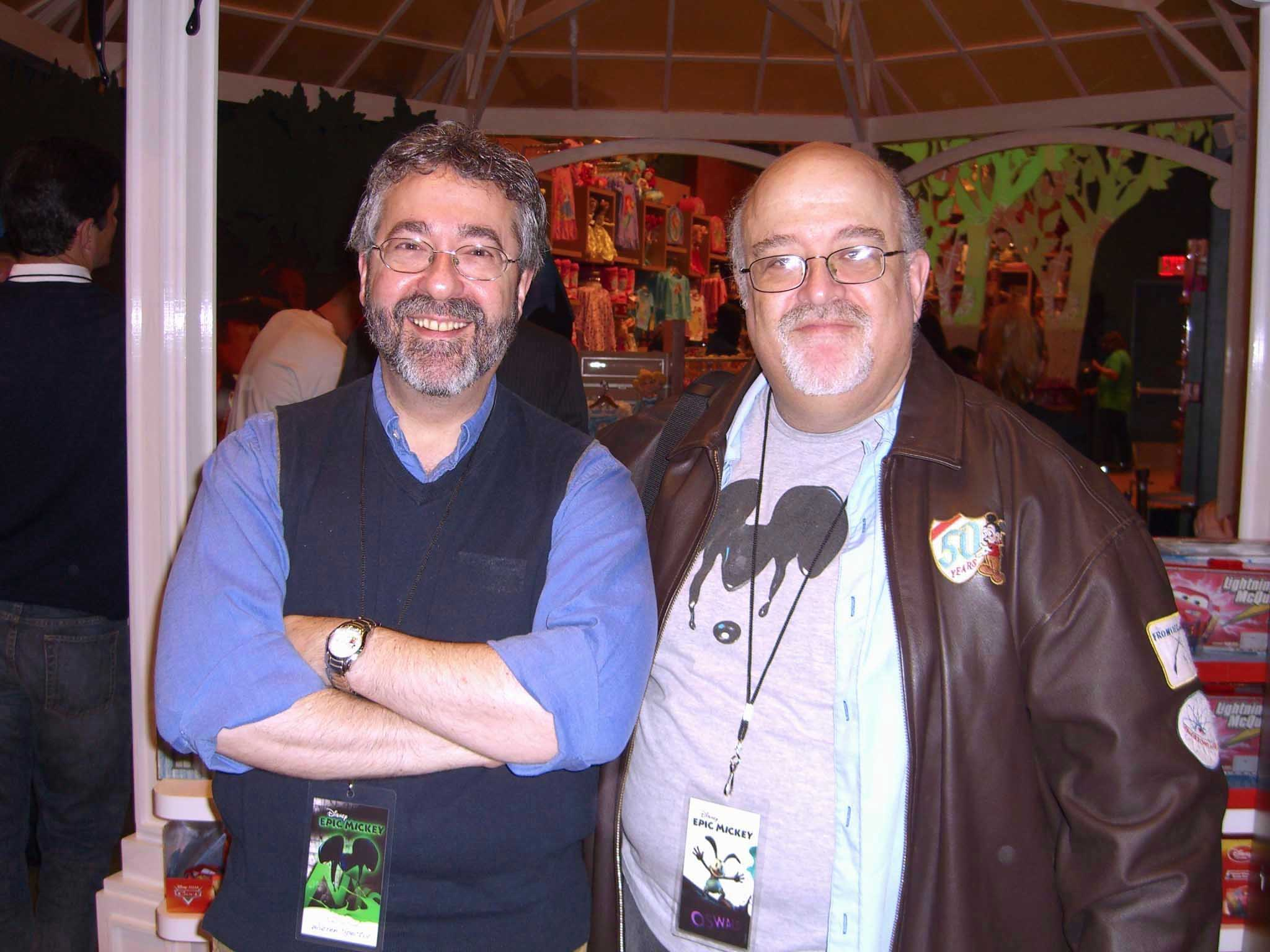
Designer Warren Spector with writer Peter David, who wrote two of the game's tie-in products, at the game's November 30, 2010 Times Square Disney Store launch party

The creative development team at Buena Vista Games formed the original concept for Epic Mickey in 2003. When the concept was pitched to Bob Iger, then-president and COO, he lamented that Disney didn't own the rights to Oswald the Lucky Rabbit and could not produce the game. Upon becoming CEO, he made it a goal to put Oswald under Disney's ownership. His chance came in 2006 when television sportscaster Al Michaels expressed interest in joining NBC (which had merged with Oswald owner Universal Pictures by this time) to call play-by-play for Sunday Night Football, even though he had just signed a long-term deal with Disney-owned ESPN to continue on Monday Night Football. Iger initiated a trade with NBC Universal that would allow Michaels to be released from his contract in exchange for the rights to Oswald and other minor assets. Disney Interactive Studios was unable to secure a developer for the game until 2007 when Disney acquired Junction Point Studios, Warren Spector's company. Around 130 people from Junction Point worked on the game. Another 150 people contributed to the project from around the world.

The game was originally intended to be released for the PlayStation 3 and Xbox 360 and its name was its working title. Development on the Wii started in 2008. When the idea of a Wii port of the game was raised, Spector replied that a straight Wii port would not be viable, remarking that many of the "design ideas just won't work on the Wii, we need to give the Wii its dues". Graham Hopper of Disney Interactive then suggested dropping the development of the PS3 and Xbox 360 versions completely, and instead releasing it solely on the Wii.

Compared to the Kingdom Hearts series, a similar video game franchise created by Japanese video game company Square Enix, which combined modern-day Disney characters with their own Final Fantasy characters, Epic Mickey emphasizes retro-vintage and long-lost Disney characters that were created much earlier, and draws more plot elements from the film Fantasia, rather than Final Fantasy; in Kingdom Hearts II, a location in the game was based on the 1920s Steamboat Willie cartoon, but other than that, the rest of the game took its cast from more recently created characters.

Mickey receives a character redesign in this game, which attempts to give him a "retro" look, and the game uses an animation engine to replicate the stretchy athleticism of cartoons. The 2D cinematics were created by Powerhouse Animation Studios, and the game utilizes Emergent Game Technologies' Gamebryo Engine. Warren Spector has stated that Epic Mickey was planned as a trilogy. An early idea for the game was for Mickey to adopt an angrier look when he was played in the "scrapper" manner; this idea was dropped after Spector decided it changed Mickey too much from people's perceptions of the character. Mickey looks more smudged instead.

The game had a limited budget. As such, there was minimal voice acting where most of the characters communicated through gestures and sounds, except for Yen Sid. This was referred to as "bark-talk" by Warren Spector.

Marvel Comics released a prequel comic based on Epic Mickey, titled Epic Mickey: Tales of Wasteland. It focuses on Mickey's half-brother Oswald the Lucky Rabbit, and gives some insight on what the Wasteland was like before Mickey's appearance and the thinner disaster. Initially distributed on Disney's Digicomics platform for iOS products, a print version released in late-August 2011. An art book, The Art of Epic Mickey, was also released in September 2011. A U.S.-exclusive Epic Mickey Collector's Edition was announced that includes special packaging, special behind-the-scenes DVD, Mickey vinyl figure, a Wii Remote skin, and Wii console skins. A separate collector's edition was released in Italy, which included the Walt Disney Treasures: The Adventures of Oswald the Lucky Rabbit DVD set and Epic Mickey: The Graphic Novel.

The game was leaked by Warez groups weeks before its official release date. Epic Mickey marks Oswald's second appearance in video games after Woody Woodpecker's Frustrated Vacations (released in Brazil only).

The music was composed by American composer James Dooley. In addition to his original works, arranged versions of Disney music appear throughout the game, which in turn were recreations of older Disney cartoons. X-Play later named it "Best Soundtrack of 2010". Dooley's score was released digitally via iTunes and Amazon on December 21, 2010.

== Promotion ==
Writer Peter David, who in 2010 was an exclusive writer for Disney-owned Marvel Comics, wrote a graphic novel adaptation of Epic Mickey, and a prequel digicomic, Epic Mickey: Tales of Wasteland. Disney also promoted the release of the game with a launch party at the Times Square Disney Store in Manhattan on November 30, 2010, the day the game was released. Present at the party was designer Warren Spector, Peter David, and actors Jennifer Grey and Kyle Massey, who had recently completed the eleventh season of the U.S. Dancing with the Stars, which is broadcast on the Disney-owned ABC.

== Reception ==
Reception

Aggregate score
Aggregator	Score
Metacritic	73/100

Review scores
Publication	Score
1Up.com	B
Destructoid	7/10
Edge	7/10
Famitsu	31/40
G4	5/5
Game Informer	7/10
GameSpot	6/10
GamesRadar+	4.5/5
GameTrailers	8.2/10
GameZone	6.5/10
Giant Bomb	2/5
IGN	8/10
Nintendo Life	7/10
Nintendo World Report	6.5/10
Official Nintendo Magazine	85%
Good Game	13/20

Epic Mickey received "mixed or average reviews" according to review aggregator Metacritic.

IGN gave it a score of 8/10, criticizing its camera, control issues and lack of voice acting, but praised its charm, story, art design, and lasting appeal for the players. Australian video game talk show Good Game's two presenters gave the game a 6 and 7 out of 10. They compared the paintbrush abilities to that of the water jet pack from Super Mario Sunshine and found it frustrating how the levels reset back to their original state after leaving. On a positive note, they said it "isn't as 'dark' or 'adult' as the hype made it out to be... I guess it is a kid's game after all, but at least it's an intelligent one. It doesn't come anywhere near the complexity and fun of something like Super Mario Sunshine, which I think it borrows some ideas from". Shirley Chase from GameZone complimented the game on its usage of Disney history but added that the game had numerous flaws saying: "For all of its good points, Disney Epic Mickey does have some glaring flaws, which can make the game feel like a chore. The most noticeable problem is the camera, which will lead to more cheap deaths than anything else". In a review for GamesRadar, Chris Antista who began the article as an admitted "diehard Disney dork", praised it as a "thoroughly heartwarming salute to Disney" and that he hasn't "fallen so head over heels with the look, feel, and play of a third-person platformer since the original Banjo-Kazooie". G4TV also named it "Best Wii Game". Giant Bomb gave a negative review with 2/5 stars saying: "Never mind these heightened expectations, though: even on its own merits, Epic Mickey is a platformer that feels about a generation behind, though one with just enough flashes of inspiration to keep you constantly aware of its wasted potential".

In its opening weekend, Epic Mickey failed to reach the UK Top 40 and even the Wii Top 10 sales charts after its November 26 UK release. On November 30, 2010, the release date in North America, the game was completely sold out on the Disney Store website by the afternoon. The game sold 1.3 million copies its first month. As of June 2011, the game had sold 2 million copies in North America and Europe combined.

== Sequel ==
In August 2011, Destructoid posted an article that speculated that a sequel, Epic Mickey 2, was in development and showed possible box art for the game. These rumors were further encouraged when Disney France and Warren Spector invited the French media to an "epic project" taking place on March 27, 2012. Nintendo Power magazine also commented on the rumor, stating that their April 2012 issue would include a "top-secret" title preview, with the preview for the issue showing a cropped-down picture of Oswald The Lucky Rabbit. Gametrailers.com also stated that their March 22, 2012 episode would include a "world-exclusive preview of Warren Spector's new epic adventure" and that it would be "notably significant". Warren Spector himself also commented on the game's development, revealing that he had "a team of over 700 people working on the sequel". Following this, on March 20, 2012, the official French Nintendo magazine posted a comment on Twitter, revealing that Disney had plans to create a companion to the main sequel for the Nintendo 3DS, under the name Disney Epic Mickey: Power of Illusion.

Warren Spector officially confirmed the rumors, revealing the sequel's title to be Disney Epic Mickey 2: The Power of Two. Spector also directly addressed the camera issues that reviewers criticized in the first game, stating that "they'll be working on it until the day we ship the second game. There have been over 1,000 specific changes made to the camera. Our goal is that you will not have to touch the manual camera controls even once to play through the main story path of this game". Spector also revealed that the game was to include voice acting and musical numbers, both of which were absent in the first game. Spector said: "I'm such a geek about musicals, I love the co-op and next-gen stuff, but for me, when a character breaks into song, which they do on a regular basis in this game, it's magic". Spector also commented on the sequel's co-op features: "It's drop-in, drop-out co-op, you can sit down at any time with a friend who is playing as Mickey, and you can take control of Oswald. If you're playing as a single player, Oswald would be there every second of the game. He's not just a multiplayer character. He's a helper, whether you're playing alone or with a friend or family member". Wasteland itself would feature old areas ruined by earthquakes and other natural disasters, as well as new areas such as one based on Disneyland's Frontierland.

It was released on Wii, PlayStation 3, Xbox 360, Microsoft Windows, PlayStation Vita, and Wii U.

== Remake ==
=== Development ===
At the February 2024 Nintendo Partner Direct, publisher THQ Nordic announced that its Austrian-based studio Purple Lamp had been developing a remake of the game titled Epic Mickey: Rebrushed, set for release later that year. It was released on September 24, 2024 on Nintendo Switch, PlayStation 4, PlayStation 5, Windows, Xbox One and Xbox Series X/S. The remake was developed in Unreal Engine 4, deviating from the Gamebryo engine used in the original game. The game released for Android and iOS on September 16, 2026, and also Nintendo Switch 2 on October 6, 2026.

=== Reception ===
Reception (Rebrushed)

Aggregate score
Aggregator	Score
Metacritic	(PS5) 76/100 (NS) 79/100 (XBSX) 80/100 (PC) 75/100

Review scores
Publication	Score
Famitsu	31/40
GamesRadar+	3.5/5
Nintendo Life	8/10
Nintendo World Report	7.5/10
Push Square	7/10
Shacknews	7/10
Video Games Chronicle	4/5

The remake received "generally favorable" reviews from critics on all systems, who felt it was an overall improvement to the original, according to review aggregator website Metacritic.

=== Sales ===
In 2024, Epic Mickey: Rebrushed ranked 4th on the United Kingdom retail charts for the week ending 28 September. In Japan, it placed 13th on the sales charts for the week of 23–29 September. In the United States, the game was the 6th best-selling Nintendo Switch title for September, excluding digital sales. Embracer Group said in its October–December 2024 financial report that Epic Mickey: Rebrushed was among its top 10 highest-earning back catalogue titles during the quarter. The company added that the game delivered a “solid back catalog performance,” supported by promotional activity, and is expected to be a long-term seller and become profitable over time.

In 2025, in the United Kingdom, Epic Mickey: Rebrushed ranked 19th for the week ending 25 January. The game later moved to 36th place for the week ending 31 January, and placed 36th again during the following week.
