= Varèse Sarabande albums discography =

American film soundtrack label

Varèse Sarabande is an American record label founded in 1978 and is currently owned by Concord Music. Its catalog includes film scores, television soundtracks, original cast recordings, and classical works. In the 1980s and 1990s, the label became an active publisher of soundtracks, releasing titles on LP, cassette, and CD.

== VC/VX series (1978) ==
Starting in 1978, Varèse Sarabande released both classical works and motion picture soundtracks on vinyl (LP). Some of the titles were reissued by Intrada Records, Kritzerland Records, and Citadel Records.

- VC-81028 The First Nudie Musical – Bruce Kimmel
- VC-81040 Piano Improvisations, Duet From Act. I – Korngold
- VC-81051 Milhaud, Joys of Life / Globetrotter Suite – Milhaud
- VC-81053 Rózsa Conducts Rózsa: Volume 1 – Miklós Rózsa
- VC-81056 William Dawson: Negro Folk Symphony – Stokowski
- VC-81058 Rózsa: Lust for Life & Background of Violence Suites – Miklós Rózsa
- VX-81060 Orchestral Space – Seiji Ozawa
- VX-81061 Ohki: Night Meditation / Fukai: 4 Movements / Kiyose: Japanese Festival Dances / Yamada: Mandara no hana – Yamaoka
- VX-81062 Saburō Moroi: Symphony #2 – Yamaoka / Yomiuri Nippon Orchestra
- VC-81070 Master of the World – Les Baxter
- VC-81071 36 Hours – Dimitri Tiomkin
- VC-81072 Silent Running – Peter Schickele (Later reissued)
- VC-81073 The Quiet Man – Victor Young
- VC-81073 Samson and Delilah – Victor Young
- VC-81074 Written on the Wind – Frank Skinner, Victor Young / Four Girls in Town – Alex North
- VC-81075 A Time to Love and a Time to Die – Miklós Rózsa
- VC-81076 This Earth Is Mine – Hugo Friedhofer
- VC-81077 Themes from Classic Science Fiction, Fantasy and Horror Films – Various Artists; Dick Jacobs conductor
- VC-81078 Goliath and the Barbarians – Les Baxter
- VC-81080 Piano Concerto No. 5 "Emperor" – Beethoven
- VC-81081 Holdridge Conducts Holdridge – Lee Holdridge, Los Angeles String Orchestra and the London Symphony Orchestra (Later released on CD)
- VC-81082 Brass Target – Laurence Rosenthal
- VC-81083 Stages – Bruce Kimmel
- VC-81084 Yatsu Haka-mura – Yasushi Akutagawa
- VC-81085 Roy Harris: Concerto for Amplified Piano, Brass & Percussion, etc. – Harris / UCLA Brass
- VC-81090 Respighi: Concerto gregoriano / de Beriot: Scene de Ballet – Borsamsky / Kegel
- VC-81091 Prokofiev: Gypsy Fantasial Sym Suite of Waltzes / Balakirev: Overture on Russian Themes – Schwleger
- VC-81092 Felix Draeseke: Symphony No. 3 in C major "Symphonia tragica", Op. 40 – Berlin Symphony Orchestra, Hermann Desser (Heinz Drewes) *Reissue of Urania LP-7162
- VC-81097 Darius Milhaud, Le Train Bleu, Auric, Les Facheux / Satie – Markevitch
- VC-81101 Jerome Moross: Two World Premiere Works from an American Master – Jerome Moross
- VC-81102 Tourist Trap – Pino Donaggio
- VC-81103 The Dunwich Horror – Les Baxter
- VC-81104 King of Kings – Miklós Rózsa
- VC-81105 Phantasm – Fred Myrow, Malcolm Seagrave
- VC-81106 Dawn of the Dead – Goblin
- VC-81107 Patrick – Brian May
- VC-81123 Roy Harris: Quintet for Piano and Strings, String Quartet No. 3
- VC-81127 Martin – Donald Rubinstein

== STV and CTV series (1979–1987) ==
In 1979, Varèse Sarabande introduced a new cataloging system using the "STV" prefix to differentiate its television and film soundtrack releases from its classical music catalog. Many of these early soundtrack titles were later reissued on CD, either by Varèse Sarabande or by other labels. These reissues are often cataloged under the label's 47000 series or as part of its CD Club.

From 1984 to 1990, most soundtracks were issued in both LP and CD formats. Titles released on cassette can be identified by their "CTV" prefix.

In 1987, Varèse Sarabande entered into a distribution agreement with MCA Distributing. The partnership increased Varèse Sarabande’s soundtrack output.

- STV-81108 Fedora – Miklós Rózsa
- STV-81109 A Little Romance – Georges Delerue
- STV-81115 The Young Lions – Hugo Friedhofer
- STV-81116 Island in the Sky – Alfred Newman / The Song of Bernadette – Hugo Friedhofer, Emil Newman, Herbert W. Spencer
- STV-81117 Blood and Sand – Alfred Newman / Blood for Dracula – Claudio Gizzi / Golden Earrings – Victor Young
- STV-81118 Magnificent Obsession – Frank Skinner
- STV-81119 Boy on a Dolphin – Hugo Friedhofer
- STV-81120 One Step Beyond – Harry Lubin
- STV-81121 Man of a Thousand Faces – Frank Skinner
- STV-81122 It Started in Naples – Carlo Savina / Alessandro Cicognini
- STV-81124 Rio Grande – Victor Young
- STV-81125 Anastasia – Alfred Newman
- STV-81126 Piranha – Pino Donaggio
- STV-81127 Martin – Donald Rubinstein
- STV-81128 Knights of the Round Table – Miklós Rózsa
- STV-81129 Meetings with Remarkable Men – Laurence Rosenthal / Thomas de Hartmann
- STV-81130 Destination Moon – Leith Stevens
- STV-81131 Bloodline – Ennio Morricone, Craig Hundley (additional music)
- STV-81132 An Almost Perfect Affair – Georges Delerue
- STV-81133 Eye of the Needle – Miklós Rózsa (re-recording)
- STV-81134 Escape from New York – John Carpenter, Alan Howarth
- STV-81135 The 7th Voyage of Sinbad – Bernard Herrmann
- STV-81136 The Devil at 4 O'Clock – George Duning
- STV-81137 Prince of the City – Paul Chihara / Georges Delerue conductor
- STV-81138 1001 Arabian Nights – George Duning
- STV-81139 Home Movies – Pino Donaggio
- STV-81140 The Day Time Ended – Richard Band
- STV-81141 True Confessions – Georges Delerue
- STV-81142 Seven Samurai / Rashomon – Fumio Hayasaka
- STV-81143 Maniac – Jay Chattaway
- STV-81144 Mad Max – Brian May
- STV-81145 The Wild Bunch – Jerry Fielding
- STV-81146 John Paul Jones – Max Steiner
- STV-81147 The Island – Ennio Morricone
- STV-81148 Dressed to Kill – Pino Donaggio
- STV-81149 Enola Gay: The Men, the Mission, the Atomic Bomb – Maurice Jarre
- STV-81150 The Howling – Pino Donaggio
- STV-81151 Night of the Living Dead – Spencer Moore / Various Artists (Released on green and red vinyl)
- STV-81152 Halloween II – John Carpenter, Alan Howarth
- STV-81153 The Formula – Bill Conti
- STV-81154 Swamp Thing – Harry Manfredini
- STV-81155 Mad Max 2: The Road Warrior – Brian May
- STV-81156 Blood for Dracula – Claudio Gizzi
- STV-81157 Flesh for Frankenstein – Claudio Gizzi
- STV-81158 The Sword and the Sorcerer – David Whitaker
- STV-81159 The Twelve Chairs – John Morris
- STV-81160 Creepshow – John Harrison
- STV-81162 The Burning – Rick Wakeman
- STV-81163 Slapstick (Of Another Kind) – Morton Stevens, Michel Legrand
- STV-81164 Eating Raoul – Arlon Ober
- STV-81165 Friendly Persuasion – Dimitri Tiomkin
- STV-81166 Last Embrace (re-recording) / Lydia – Miklós Rózsa
- STV-81167 The Man from Snowy River – Bruce Rowland
- STV-81169 The Secret of NIMH – Jerry Goldsmith
- STV-81170 Forbidden Zone – Danny Elfman / Oingo Boingo
- STV-81171 The Twilight Zone – Various Artists
- STV-81172 10 to Midnight – Robert O. Ragland
- STV-81173 Videodrome – Howard Shore
- STV-81174 The Beastmaster – Lee Holdridge
- STV-81175 La Notte Di San Lorenzo – Nicola Piovani
- STV-81176 Halloween – John Carpenter
- STV-81178 The Twilight Zone: Volume Two – Various Artists
- STV-81179 Magic Fire – Richard Wagner / Erich Wolfgang Korngold
- STV-81180 The Winds of War – Bob Cobert
- STV-81181 Liquid Sky – Slava Tsukerman, Brenda Hutchinson, Clive Smith
- STV-81182 The Year of Living Dangerously – Maurice Jarre
- STV-81184 The Hunger – Michel Rubini, Denny Jaeger / Various Artists
- STV-81185 The Twilight Zone: Volume Three – Various Artists
- STV-81186 Young Warriors – Robert J. Walsh
- STV-81187 Hercules – Pino Donaggio
- STV-81188 The Final Option – Roy Budd / Jerry Donahue & Marc Donahue (Titled Who Dares Wins in Europe.)
- STV-81189 Invitation au voyage – Gabriel Yared
- STV-81190 Il Gattopardo – Nino Rota
- STV-81191 The Fog – John Carpenter
- STV-81192 The Twilight Zone: Volume Four – Various Artists
- STV-81193 A Minor Miracle – Rick Patterson
- STV-81194 Heat and Dust – Richard Robbins / Zakir Hussain
- STV-81195 Revenge of the Ninja – Robert J. Walsh
- STV-81197 Brainstorm – James Horner (Digital re-recording by London Symphony Orchestra and Chorus.)
- STV-81198 The Osterman Weekend – Lalo Schifrin
- STV-81199 The Evil Dead – Joseph LoDuca
- STV-81202 Blind Date – Stanley Myers / John Kongos (songs)
- STV-81203 Children of the Corn – Jonathan Elias
- STV-81204 Making the Grade – Basil Poledouris / Various Artists
- STV-81205 The Twilight Zone: Volume Five – Various Artists
- STV-81206 Gorky Park – James Horner
- STV-81207 Wavelength – Tangerine Dream
- STV-81208 Lassiter – Ken Thorne
- STV-81209 Mutant – Richard Band
- STV-81210 Blame It on Rio – Kenneth Wannberg / Various Artists
- STV-81211 Sahara – Ennio Morricone
- STV-81212 Roy Rogers and the Sons of the Pioneers – Various Artists
- STV-81213 Oltre la Porta – Pino Donaggio
- STV-81217 Berlin Alexanderplatz – Peer Raben
- STV-81219 Top Secret! – Maurice Jarre
- STV-81220 Cousteau – Amazon Part 1: The River – John Scott
- STV-81221 Careful, He Might Hear You – Ray Cook
- STV-81222 The Fourth Man – Loek Dikker
- STV-81224 Swann in Love – Hans Werner Henze / Die Verlorene Ehre Der Katharina Blum Oder: Wie Gewalt Entstehen Und Wohin Sie Führen Kann
- STV-81225 Sheena – Richard Hartley
- STV-81226 Until September – John Barry
- STV-81227 La Pirate – Philippe Sarde / Un Dimanche à La Campagne – Louis Ducreux, Marc Perrone
- STV-81228 Bolero – Peter Bernstein / Elmer Bernstein
- STV-81229 Places in the Heart – John Kander / Howard Shore
- STV-81230 Phar Lap – Bruce Rowland
- STV-81231 Supergirl – Jerry Goldsmith
- STV-81232 The Flamingo Kid – Various Artists
- STV-81233 Starman – Jack Nitzsche
- STV-81234 Runaway – Jerry Goldsmith
- STV-81235 The Shooting Party – John Scott
- STV-81236 A Nightmare on Elm Street – Charles Bernstein
- STV-81237 Witness – Maurice Jarre
- STV-81239 Certain Fury – George Massenburg, Russell Kunkel, Bill Payne
- STV-81240 The Aviator – Dominic Frontiere
- STV-81241 Cat's Eye – Alan Silvestri
- STV-81242 The Company of Wolves – George Fenton
- STV-81243 The Gods Must Be Crazy – John Boshoff
- STV-81244 The Emerald Forest – Junior Homrich with Brian Gascoigne
- STV-81245 Christopher Columbus – Riz Ortolani
- STV-81246 Rambo: First Blood Part II – Jerry Goldsmith
- STV-81247 Just the Way You Are – Vladimir Cosma / Wetherby – Nick Bicât
- STV-81248 Red Sonja – Ennio Morricone
- STV-81249 Lifeforce – Henry Mancini
- STV-81250 Music of the Republic Studios Serials – William Lava, Cy Feuer, Paul Sawtell / James King conductor
- STV-81251 Dance with a Stranger – Richard Hartley
- STV-81252 Jagged Edge – John Barry
- STV-81253 The Black Cauldron – Elmer Bernstein
- STV-81254 The Bride – Maurice Jarre
- STV-81255 Ediths Tagebuch – Jürgen Knieper
- STV-81256 Flesh+Blood – Basil Poledouris
- STV-81257 Agnes of God – Georges Delerue
- STV-81258 Paroles et Musique – Michel Legrand
- STV-81259 The Red Pony – Aaron Copland
- STV-81260 Return to Eden – Brian May
- STV-81261 Re-Animator – Richard Band
- STV-81262 Zone Troopers / The Alchemist – Richard Band
- STV-81263 Invasion U.S.A. – Jay Chattaway
- STV-81264 Silver Bullet – Jay Chattaway
- STV-81265 Marie – Francis Lai
- STV-81266 Year of the Dragon – David Mansfield
- STV-81267 Transylvania 6-5000 – Lee Holdridge
- STV-81268 Marie Ward – Elmer Bernstein
- STV-81269 Subway – Éric Serra
- STV-81270 Spies Like Us – Elmer Bernstein
- STV-81271 Enemy Mine – Maurice Jarre
- STV-81272 The Final Conflict – Jerry Goldsmith
- STV-81273 Mountbatten: The Last Viceroy – John Scott
- STV-81274 The Clan of the Cave Bear – Alan Silvestri
- STV-81275 A Nightmare on Elm Street Part 2: Freddy's Revenge – Christopher Young
- STV-81276 F/X – Bill Conti
- STV-81277 Ginger e Fred – Nicola Piovani
- STV-81278 April Fool's Day – Charles Bernstein
- STV-81279 Crawlspace – Pino Donaggio
- STV-81281 The Ewok Adventure / Ewoks: The Battle for Endor – Peter Bernstein
- STV-81282 The Manhattan Project – Philippe Sarde
- STV-81283 Aliens – James Horner
- STV-81284 Apology – Maurice Jarre
- STV-81285 Jake Speed – Mark Snow
- STV-81286 Raw Deal – Cinemascore
- STV-81287 Roman Polanski's Pirates – Philippe Sarde
- STV-81288 Vamp – Jonathan Elias
- STV-81289 The Fly – Howard Shore
- STV-81290 Where the River Runs Black – James Horner
- STV-81291 Deadly Friend – Charles Bernstein
- STV-81292 Blue Velvet – Angelo Badalamenti
- STV-81293 Tai-Pan – Maurice Jarre
- STV-81294 Link – Jerry Goldsmith
- STV-81295 Peggy Sue Got Married – John Barry / Various Artists
- STV-81296 Crocodile Dundee – Peter Best
- STV-81297 Sky Bandits – Alfi Kabiljo
- STV-81298 Crimes of the Heart – Georges Delerue
- STV-81299 The Boy Who Could Fly – Bruce Broughton
- STV-81300 52 Pick-Up – Gary Chang
- STV-81301 Let's Get Harry – Brad Fiedel
- STV-81302 King Kong Lives – John Scott
- STV-81303 Firewalker – Gary Chang
- STV-81304 Lionheart: Volume 1 – Jerry Goldsmith
- STV-81305 Down Twisted – Berlin Game
- STV-81306 84 Charing Cross Road – George Fenton
- STV-81307 The Bedroom Window – Michael Shrieve / Patrick Gleeson
- STV-81308 The Kindred – David Newman
- STV-81309 From the Hip – Paul Zaza
- STV-81310 Death Before Dishonor – Brian May
- STV-81311 Lionheart: Volume Two – Jerry Goldsmith
- STV-81312 Amazing Grace and Chuck – Elmer Bernstein
- STV-81313 Evil Dead II – Joseph LoDuca
- STV-81314 A Nightmare on Elm Street 3: Dream Warriors – Angelo Badalamenti
- STV-81315 The Whistle Blower – John Scott
- STV-81317 Good Morning, Babylon – Nicola Piovani
- STV-81318 Raising Arizona / Blood Simple – Carter Burwell
- STV-81319 Three for the Road – Barry Goldberg
- STV-81320 Desperately Seeking Susan – Thomas Newman / Making Mr. Right – Chaz Jankel
- STV-81321 Capriccio – Riz Ortolani
- STV-81322 My Demon Lover – David Newman / Ed Alton
- STV-81324 House / House II: The Second Story – Harry Manfredini
- STV-81327 Julia and Julia – Maurice Jarre
- STV-81328 The Believers – J. Peter Robinson
- STV-81329 Hope and Glory – Peter Martin
- STV-81330 RoboCop – Basil Poledouris
- STV-81331 The Penitent – Alex North (Cancelled)
- STV-81333 Masters of the Universe – Bill Conti
- STV-81334 No Way Out – Maurice Jarre
- STV-81335 Russkies – James Newton Howard
- STV-81336 Nowhere to Hide – Brad Fiedel
- STV-81338 Housekeeping – Michael Gibbs
- STV-81339 Three O'Clock High – Tangerine Dream / Sylvester Levay / Jim Walker
- STV-81340 Prince of Darkness – John Carpenter, Alan Howarth
- STV-81341 The Dead / Journey into Fear – Alex North
- STV-81343 Man on Fire – John Scott
- STV-81344 Nightflyers – Doug Timm
- STV-81345 Near Dark – Tangerine Dream
- STV-81346 Tough Guys Don't Dance – Angelo Badalamenti
- STV-81347 The Whales of August – Alan Price
- STV-81348 Surrender – Michel Colombier
- STV-81349 The Hidden – Michael Convertino
- STV-81350 Weeds – Angelo Badalamenti
- STV-81352 No Man's Land – Basil Poledouris
- STV-81353 Anna – Greg Hawkes
- STV-81354 Five Corners – James Newton Howard
- STV-81355 Sister, Sister – Richard Einhorn
- STV-81356 The Running Man – Harold Faltermeyer
- STV-81357 Shy People – Tangerine Dream
- STV-81358 Flowers in the Attic – Christopher Young
- STV-81359 In a Shallow Grave – Jonathan Sheffer
- STV-81360 Noble House – Paul Chihara
- STV-81361 Prison – Richard Band / Christopher L. Stone
- STV-81362 The Serpent and the Rainbow – Brad Fiedel

== 704/1000 digital LP series (1979–1988) ==
Beginning in 1979, the label distinguished its digital records from their standard editions with the 704/1000 series. The series features classical releases and digital soundtracks. It lasted until 1988, when the label officially joined MCA.

The DBX Recording Technology Showcase Series was released as part of the 1000 series.

Some soundtrack releases had a CD counterpart that share the same catalog number, though few were produced. Since these vinyl albums were not released with a suffix, VCDM has been added to avoid confusion between the 704 series CD as Varèse Sarabande Digital LP.

- RTS-2 Beyond the Sound Barrier: The Spectacular Sound of Digital DBX Discs – Various Artists / Morton Gould & Lee Holdridge, the London Symphony Orchestra
- VCDM-1000.10 Gould: Latin-American Symphonette – Morton Gould, the London Symphony Orchestra
- VCDM-1000.40 Withrow: Concerto for Violin and Orchestra No. 2 / Lazarus and His Beloved (Symphonic Suite from the Opera) – Lee Holdridge conductor, the London Symphony Orchestra
- VCDM-1000.60 Dvorak: The Devil's Trill, A Vaclav Hudecek Recital – Václav Hudeček, Josef Hála, Susumu Miyashita, Giuseppe Tartini, Pablo de Sarasate
- VCDM-1000.100 Vivaldi: The Four Seasons – Patrick Gleeson
- VCDM-1000.140 Tchaikovsky: Symphony No. 6 "Pathétique" – Enrique Bátiz, the London Symphony Orchestra
- VCDM-1000.150 Rodrigo: Fantasía para un gentilhombre / Concierto Andaluz – Enrique Bátiz, Orquesta Sinfónica del Estado de México
- VCDM-1000.190 Dvorak: Symphony No. 9 "From The New World" – Enrique Bátiz, the London Symphony Orchestra
- VCDM 704.120 John Williams: Flute and Violin Concerto – Leonard Slatkin conductor, London Symphony Orchestra (Mark Peskanov, violin soloist & Peter Lloyd, flute soloist)
- VCDM-704.130 Armenian Suite / Symphony No. 2 "Psalms" – Richard Yardumian / Varujan Kojian, Utah Symphony Orchestra, Lili Chookasian
- VCDM-704.200 Korngold: Sinfonietta for Large Orchestra, Op. 5 – Erich Wolfgang Korngold / Gerd Albrecht conductor, the Berlin Radio Symphony Orchestra
- VCDM-704.226 Music Of Miklós Rózsa (Spellbound Concerto) – Miklós Rózsa/ Elmer Bernstein cond. Dorothy Jonas & Joshua Pierce (Duo Piano) and Cynthia Millar, Ondes Martenot & the Utah Symphony Orchestra
- VCDM-704.250 Music from Alfred Hitchcock Films – John Williams / Dimitri Tiomkin / Franz Waxman / Roy Webb, Charles Ketchum, conductor & the Utah Symphony Orchestra
- VCDM-704.270 Star Trek: Volume One – Alexander Courage / Sol Kaplan / Fred Steiner (re-recording)
- VCDM-704.300 Star Trek: Volume Two – George Duning / Alexander Courage / Jerry Fielding / Fred Steiner (re-recording)
- VCDM-704.370 Pee-wee's Big Adventure / Back to School – Danny Elfman / John Coleman conductor (re-recording)
- VCDM-704.380 The Sea Hawk – Erich Wolfgang Korngold / Varujan Kojian conductor
- VCDM-704.390 Suspect – Michael Kamen
- VCDM-704.400 Wall Street / Salvador – Stewart Copeland / Georges Delerue
- VCDM-704.420 Zelly and Me – Pino Donaggio
- VCDM-704.430 Au revoir les enfants – Franz Schubert / Jean-François Heisser
- VCDM-704.440 Pass The Ammo – Carter Burwell (Cancelled)
- VCDM-704.450 Off Limits – James Newton Howard
- VCDM-704.470 White Mischief – George Fenton
- VCDM-704.510 Return to Snowy River – Bruce Rowland
- VCDM-704.520 Two Moon Junction – Jonathan Elias
- VCDM-704.530 Lady In White – Frank LaLoggia
- VCDM-704.540 Dominick and Eugene – Trevor Jones
- VCDM-704.560 Bad Dreams – Jay Ferguson
- VCDM-704.570 Dead Heat – Ernest Troost
- VCDM-704.590 Stand and Deliver – Craig Safan
- VCDM-704.600 Eight Men Out – Mason Daring / Various Artists
- VCDM-704.610 D.O.A. – Chaz Jankel
- VCDM-704.620 Poltergeist III – Joe Renzetti
- VCDM-704.700 Betrayed – Bill Conti

== 5200 LP series (1988–1991) ==
After the label completed its deal with MCA Distributing, they continued to produce records until 1991.

The label reassigned the number of their LPs to match their CD counterparts. CDs used a VSD prefix (Varèse Sarabande Disc) while LPs used a VS prefix. Not all CD releases had an LP counterpart.

- VS-5201 Crossing Delancey – Paul Chihara / the Roches
- VS-5202 Bat-21 – Christopher Young
- VS-5203 A Nightmare on Elm Street 4: The Dream Master – Craig Safan (score album)
- VS-5204 Madame Sousatzka – Gerald Gouriet / Various Artists
- VS-5205 Halloween 4: The Return of Michael Myers – Alan Howarth
- VS-5208 Screen Themes – Various Artists / John Scott
- VS-5209 Wisdom – Danny Elfman
- VS-5210 Criminal Law – Jerry Goldsmith
- VS-5211 Cocoon: The Return – James Horner
- VS-5215 Talk Radio / Wall Street – Stewart Copeland
- VS-5216 Farewell to the King – Basil Poledouris
- VS-5219 Three Fugitives – David McHugh
- VS-5220 The Fly II – Christopher Young
- VS-5223 Heathers – David Newman
- VS-5226 Leviathan – Jerry Goldsmith
- VS-5227 Pet Sematary – Elliot Goldenthal
- VS-5230 Red Scorpion – Jay Chattaway
- VS-5231 Cold Feet – Tom Bahler
- VS-5234 Ginger Ale Afternoon – Willie Dixon
- VS-5235 The Abyss – Alan Silvestri
- VS-5237 Wired – Michael Chiklis & The Wired Band / Basil Poledouris
- VS-5238 A Nightmare on Elm Street 5: The Dream Child – Jay Ferguson (score album)
- VS-5239 Halloween 5: The Revenge of Michael Myers – Alan Howarth
- VS-5240 Christine – John Carpenter / Alan Howarth
- VS-5244 My Left Foot / Da – Elmer Bernstein
- VS-5246 Driving Miss Daisy – Hans Zimmer / Various Artists
- VS-5248 Music Box – Philippe Sarde
- VS-5253 Enemies, A Love Story – Maurice Jarre
- VS-5254 Triumph of the Spirit – Cliff Eidelman
- VS-5255 Stanley & Iris – John Williams
- VS-5267 Total Recall – Jerry Goldsmith
- VS-5269 Gremlins 2: The New Batch – Jerry Goldsmith
- VS-5271 RoboCop 2 – Leonard Rosenman
- VS-5272 Back to the Future Part III – Alan Silvestri
- VS-5273 Die Hard 2: Die Harder – Michael Kamen
- VS-5274 After Dark, My Sweet – Maurice Jarre
- VS-5276 Ghost – Maurice Jarre
- VS-5280 Presumed Innocent – John Williams
- VS-5283 Hardware – Simon Boswell
- VS-5284 Desperate Hours – David Mansfield
- VS-5286 Pacific Heights – Hans Zimmer
- VS-5287 The Last Butterfly – Alex North / Milan Svoboda
- VS-5288 Miller's Crossing – Carter Burwell
- VS-5289 White Palace – George Fenton
- VS-5290 The Grifters – Elmer Bernstein
- VS-5291 Jacob's Ladder – Maurice Jarre
- VS-5292 The Field – Elmer Bernstein
- VS-5293 Memphis Belle – George Fenton
- VS-5294 Henry & June – Mark Adler / Various Artists
- VS-5299 Mr. Destiny – David Newman
- VS-5300 Welcome Home, Roxy Carmichael – Thomas Newman
- VS-5302 Predator 2 – Alan Silvestri
- VS-5303 Class Action – James Horner
- VS-5304 The Long Walk Home – George Fenton
- VS-5305 Kindergarten Cop – Randy Edelman
- VS-5306 Come See the Paradise – Randy Edelman / Various Artists
- VS-5307 Almost an Angel – Maurice Jarre
- VS-5308 Once Around – James Horner / Various Artists
- VS-5309 Green Card – Hans Zimmer
- VS-5310 Guilty by Suspicion – James Newton Howard / Various Artists
- VS-5312 Switch – Henry Mancini (score album)
- VS-5313 Oscar – Elmer Bernstein
- VS-5314 La Femme Nikita – Éric Serra
- VS-5315 The Hard Way – Arthur B. Rubinstein
- VS-5317 Out for Justice – David Michael Frank / Various Artists
- VS-5318 Omen IV: The Awakening – Jonathan Sheffer
- VS-5321 City Slickers – Marc Shaiman / Various Artists
- VS-5322 Soapdish – Alan Silvestri
- VS-5323 Hudson Hawk – Michael Kamen & Robert Kraft / Various Artists
- VS-5324 Only the Lonely – Maurice Jarre / Various Artists
- VS-5325 A Rage in Harlem – Elmer Bernstein
- VS-5326 Crossing the Line – Ennio Morricone
- VS-5330 Pure Luck – Jonathan Sheffer / Danny Elfman
- VS-5331 The Naked Gun / The Naked Gun 2½: The Smell of Fear – Ira Newborn
- VS-5332 Doc Hollywood – Carter Burwell / Various Artists
- VS-5333 Freddy's Dead: The Final Nightmare – Brian May (score album)
- VS-5334 Mobsters – Michael Small
- VS-5335 Terminator 2: Judgment Day – Brad Fiedel
- VS-5336 Dutch – Alan Silvestri / Various Artists (Cancelled)
- VS-5337 Body Parts – Loek Dikker
- VS-5338 Hot Shots! – Sylvester Levay
- VS-5339 Dead Again – Patrick Doyle
- VS-5343 Little Man Tate – Mark Isham
- VS-5344 Ricochet – Alan Silvestri (the song "Ricochet" performed by Ice-T) (the last vinyl LP produced by the label)

== 47000 series (1983–1987) ==
Varèse Sarabande began producing compact discs around 1983. Their initial releases were created without a barcode and were printed and produced by the Japan Victor Company (JVC). The label switched to Laser Video for a period between 1986 and 1987. Later releases were exclusively pressed by JVC America. This series is known for gaps in the catalog numbers.

This series was started by Tom Null. Null left Varèse in 1993 to start Citadel Records, which reissued a lot of Varèse's out-of-print titles.

Varèse made an agreement with Columbia House to release a selection of classical titles and were marked with the Columbia Record Club moniker "CRC."

- VSD-47105 Phantasm – Fred Myrow / Malcolm Seagrave (Cancelled in USA; limited European release)
- VCD-47106 Dawn of the Dead – Goblin (Limited CDs released)
- VCD-47144 Mad Max – Brian May
- VCD-47148 Dressed to Kill – Pino Donaggio
- VCD-47152 Halloween II – John Carpenter / Alan Howarth
- VCD-47180 The Winds of War – Bob Cobert
- VCD-47181 Liquid Sky – Slava Tsukerman / Brenda I. Hutchinson / Clive Smith
- VCD-47201 Star Wars Trilogy – John Williams / Varujan Kojian conductor the Utah Symphony Orchestra
- VCD-47202 The Adventures of Robin Hood – Erich Wolfgang Korngold / Varujan Kojian conductor the Utah Symphony Orchestra
- VCD-47203 Kings Row – Erich Wolfgang Korngold / Charles Gerhardt conductor National Philharmonic Orchestra (Also released as Andante ACD-805707)
- VCD-47204 The Empire Strikes Back – John Williams / Charles Gerhardt conductor National Philharmonic Orchestra (reissued as VSD-5353)
- VCD-47205 North by Northwest – Bernard Herrmann / Laurie Johnson conducts the London Studio Orchestra (First pressing used a digital recording. Later pressings utilized the analog tape sources.)
- VCD-47206 Camelot (1982 OCR starring Richard Harris) – Alan Jay Lerner & Frederick Loewe
- VCD-47207 Liszt: Symphony No.2 "Dante" – Varujan Kojian & the Utah Symphony Orchestra
- VCD-47208 Scheherazade / Russian & Ludmilla Overture – Rimsky-Korsakov / Glinka, Loris Tjeknavorian & the London Symphony Orchestra (Also licensed to Columbia Record Club.)
- VCD-47209 Morton Gould Conducts Works by Ravel, Shostakovich, Weinberger, Granados, José Luis Turina & Ginastera – Morton Gould
- VCD-47210 Enrique Bátiz Conducts Music of Spain, Volume One: Manuel de Falla: Nights in the Gardens of Spain / The Three Cornered Hat (complete ballet) – Eva Maria Zuk (piano), Maria Luisa Salinas (soprano), Enrique Batiz Orquesta Sinfónica del Estado de México
- VCD4-7211 Aaron Copland: Saga of the Prairies, An Outdoor Overture / Samuel Barber: Capricorn Concerto, First Essay for Orchestra / Charles Ives: Overture from the Third Orchestral Set – the Pacific Symphony Orchestra, Keith Clark (Also released as Andante ACD-85705)
- VCD-47212 The Four Seasons – Antonio Vivaldi / Patrick Gleeson (synthesizers) (Also licensed to Columbia Record Club.)
- VCD-47213 In an Autumn Garden – Tōru Takemitsu & the Tokyo Gagaku Orchestra
- VCD-47214 Sinfonietta For Large Orchestra Opus 5 – Erich Wolfgang Korngold / Gerd Albrecht conducts (later reissued as VSD-5311)
- VCD-47215 Brainstorm – James Horner
- VCD-47216 Symphony No. 9 in E Minor, Op. 95 "From the New World"; Carnival Overture, Op. 92 – Antonín Dvořák / Enrique Batiz & the London Philharmonic Orchestra (Also licensed to Columbia Record Club.)
- VCD-47217 The Man from Snowy River – Bruce Rowland
- VCD-47218 Supergirl – Jerry Goldsmith (Later issued by Silva Screen Records)
- VCD-47219 Enrique Bátiz Conducts Music of Spain, Volume Two: Rodrigo/Fantasia Para Un Gentilhombre/Concierto Andaluz/Falla/El Amor Brujo (complete) – Enrique Bátiz, Orquesta Sinfónica del Estado de México
- VCD-47220 Starman – Jack Nitzsche
- VCD-47221 Runaway – Jerry Goldsmith
- VCD-47222 The Year of Living Dangerously – Maurice Jarre
- VCD-47223 Wavelength – Tangerine Dream
- VCD-47224 Escape from New York – John Carpenter / Alan Howarth
- VCD-47225 Music from Alfred Hitchcock Films – John Williams / Dimitri Tiomkin / Franz Waxman / Roy Webb, Charles Ketchum, conductor & the Utah Symphony Orchestra
- VCD-47226 The World, the Flesh and the Devil / New England Concerto / Because of Him / Spellbound Concerto – Miklós Rózsa / Elmer Bernstein conductor featuring Dorothy Jonas & Joshua Pierce duo piano soloists and Cynthia Millar on ondes Martenot
- VCD-47227 Witness – Maurice Jarre
- VCD-47228 Mahler Symphony No. 4 – Gustav Mahler / Bruno Walter conductor & the Vienna Philharmonic, Irmgard Seefried (soprano)
- VCD-47229 Digital Space – Morton Gould & the London Symphony Orchestra (first all-digital LP recording)
- VCD-47230 Halloween – John Carpenter
- VCD-47231 The Secret of NIMH – Jerry Goldsmith (later reissued as VSD-5541)
- VCD-47232 Symphony No. 3 in C Minor, Op. 78 "Organ"; "Fingal's Cave" ("The Hebrides") Concert Overture, Op. 26 – Camille Saint-Saëns / Felix Mendelssohn, Loris Tjeknavorian
- VCD-47233 The Best of Twilight Zone: Volume One – Various Artists
- VCD-47234 Rambo: First Blood Part II – Jerry Goldsmith
- VCD-47235 Star Trek: Volume One – Alexander Courage / Sol Kaplan / Fred Steiner (re-recording) (Fred Steiner conductor, the Royal Philharmonic Orchestra)
- VCD-47236 John Wayne Westerns: Volume One: The Comancheros & True Grit – Elmer Bernstein & the Utah Symphony Orchestra
- VCD-47237 Morton Gould Conducts His Latin American Symphonette – Morton Gould & the London Symphony Orchestra
- VCD-47238 The Blue Max – Jerry Goldsmith
- VCD-47239 Menotti / Barber Violin Concertos – Ruggiero Ricci / Keith Clark & the Pacific Symphony Orchestra
- VCD-47240 Star Trek: Volume Two – George Duning / Alexander Courage / Jerry Fielding / Fred Steiner (re-recording) (Fred Steiner conductor, the Royal Philharmonic Orchestra)
- VCD-47241 The Black Cauldron – Elmer Bernstein (re-recording) the Utah Symphony Orchestra
- VCD-47242 The Final Conflict – Jerry Goldsmith (first "Masters Film Music" release)
- VCD-47243 Winter. Marginalia. Gitimalya. – Tōru Takemitsu / Hiroyuki Iwaki conductor Tokyo Metropolitan Symphony Orchestra
- VCD-47244 The Film Music of Lee Holdridge – Lee Holdridge / Charles Gerhardt conductor the London Symphony Orchestra
- VCD-47245 Symphony No. 6 "Gettysburg" / Copland: The Emily Dickinson Songs – Roy Harris / Marni Nixon, Keith Clark & the Pacific Symphony Orchestra
- VCD-47246 Spies Like Us – Elmer Bernstein
- VCD-47247 The Best of Twilight Zone: Volume Two – Various Artists
- VCD-47248 Toward the Unknown Region, Fantasia on a Theme by Tallis / Five Variants on "Dives and Lazarus" / Norfolk Rhapsody No. 1 – Ralph Vaughan Williams / Norman Del Mar conductor
- VCD-47249 Enemy Mine – Maurice Jarre
- VCD-47250 The Right Stuff / North and South (re-recording) – Bill Conti & the London Symphony Orchestra
- VCD-47251 The Emerald Forest – Junior Homrich / Brian Gascoigne
- VCD-47252 The Clan of the Cave Bear – Alan Silvestri
- VCD-47253 Orchestral Space – Seiji Ozawa & Yomiuri Nippon Symphony
- VCD-47254 The Ghost and Mrs. Muir – Bernard Herrmann / Elmer Bernstein conductor (Limited edition reissue)
- VCD-47255 A Nightmare on Elm Street – Charles Bernstein / A Nightmare on Elm Street 2: Freddy's Revenge – Christopher Young
- VCD-47256 The 7th Voyage of Sinbad – Bernard Herrmann
- VCD-47257 Villa Lobos Conducts Villa Lobos: Choros No. 6 & Bachianas Brasileiras No. 7 – Heitor Villa-Lobos conductor
- VCD-47258 The Jungle Book / The Thief of Bagdad – Miklós Rózsa (re-recording) the Nuremberg Symphony Orchestra
- VCD-47259 Stone Flower: Symphonic Suite of Waltzes / Gypsy Fantasia / Symphony in Three Movements – Stravinsky, the Vienna Philharmonic, Wilhelm Furtwängler, Sergei Prokofiev, Hans Schwieger, the Kansas City Philharmonic
- VCD-47260 Gorky Park – James Horner
- VCD-47261 The Hunger – Michel Rubini & Denny Jaeger / Various Artists
- VCD-47262 The Road Warrior (Mad Max 2) – Brian May
- VCD-47263 Aliens – James Horner
- VCD-47264 John Wayne Westerns: Volume Two: Big Jake, Cahill & The Shootist – Elmer Bernstein & the Utah Symphony Orchestra
- VCD-47265 Roman Polanski's Pirates – Philippe Sarde (CD contains more music than LP release)
- VCD-47266 Poltergeist II: The Other Side – Jerry Goldsmith (Produced and released in US by Intrada Records)
- VCD-47267 The Fog – John Carpenter
- VCD-47268 Ben-Hur / El Cid / King of Kings – Miklós Rózsa / Richard Mullen-Lampertz conducts, Hamburg Concert Orchestra and Chorus
- VCD-47269 Knights of the Round Table / Lydia – Miklós Rózsa
- VCD-47270 The Avengers: The Television and Movie Music of Laurie Johnson – Laurie Johnson & the London Symphony Orchestra
- VCD-47271 The Seven Samurai / Rashomon – Fumio Hayasaka
- VCD-47272 The Fly – Howard Shore (CD contains more music than LP release)
- VCD-47273 Where the River Runs Black – James Horner
- VCD-47274 Tai-Pan – Maurice Jarre (the first "Laser Video" pressed CD for the label)
- VCD-47275 Peggy Sue Got Married – John Barry / Various Artists
- VCD-47276 Link – Jerry Goldsmith
- VCD-47277 Blue Velvet – Angelo Badalamenti
- VCD-47278 Crimes of the Heart – Georges Delerue
- VCD-47279 The Boy Who Could Fly – Bruce Broughton (re-recording) (recorded in London)
- VCD-47281 Pee-wee's Big Adventure / Back to School – Danny Elfman / John Coleman conductor (re-recording) (recorded in London)
- VCD-47282 Lionheart: Volume One – Jerry Goldsmith
- VCD-47283 Crocodile Dundee – Peter Best (First USA pressing features an error. Released in Europe by Silva Screen Records)
- VCD-47284 Raising Arizona / Blood Simple – Carter Burwell
- VCD-47285 Amazing Grace and Chuck – Elmer Bernstein
- VSD-47286 Raw Deal – Cinemascore (1992 Colosseum Europe; reissued in the US as VSD-5519)
- VCD-47288 Lionheart: Volume Two – Jerry Goldsmith
- VCD-47290 Hope and Glory – Peter Martin
- VCD-47291 Desperately Seeking Susan – Thomas Newman / Making Mr. Right – Chaz Jankel
- VCD-47293 A Nightmare on Elm Street 3: Dream Warriors – Angelo Badalamenti (score album)
- VCD-47295 House / House II: The Second Story – Harry Manfredini
- VCD-47298 RoboCop – Basil Poledouris
- VCD-47299 The Penitent – Alex North (Cancelled. Tapes are presumed lost.)
- VCD-47300 Masters of the Universe – Bill Conti
- VCD-47301 No Way Out – Maurice Jarre (the last "Laser Video" pressed CD)
- VCD-47304 The Sea Hawk – Erich Wolfgang Korngold / Varujan Kojian conductor
- VCD-47307 Three O'Clock High – Tangerine Dream / Sylvester Levay
- VCD-47308 Housekeeping – Michael Gibbs
- VCD-47309 Near Dark – Tangerine Dream
- VCD-47310 Prince of Darkness – John Carpenter / Alan Howarth
- VCD-47311 The Whales of August – Alan Price
- VCD-47312 Surrender – Michel Colombier
- VCD-47313 Weeds – Angelo Badalamenti
- VCD-47314 Man on Fire – John Scott
- VCD-47315 Suspect – Michael Kamen
- VCD-47327 Julia and Julia – Maurice Jarre
- VCD-47341 The Dead / Journey into Fear – Alex North
- VCD-47349 The Hidden – Michael Convertino
- VCD-47352 No Man's Land – Basil Poledouris
- VCD-47354 5 Corners – James Newton Howard
- VCD-47356 The Running Man – Harold Faltermeyer
- VCD-47357 Shy People – Tangerine Dream
- VCD-47360 Noble House – Paul Chihara
- VCD-47362 The Serpent and the Rainbow – Brad Fiedel (Limited to an estimated 400 copies. Re-released in 2016 as part of The Little Box of Horrors box set. Definitively released in March 2021.)

== 70400 series (1988) ==
This batch of titles started with Varèse's new distribution deal with MCA (later on Universal Music Group (UMG)) in late 1987. The label instituted a barcode system with a limited press run during the label's transition with MCA. These titles featured a unique package design.

- VCD-70440 Wall Street / Salvador – Stewart Copeland / Georges Delerue
- VCD-70442 Zelly and Me – Pino Donaggio
- VCD-70443 Au revoir les enfants – Franz Schubert / Jean-François Heisser
- VCD-70445 Off Limits – James Newton Howard
- VCD-70446 Mozart: Symphony No. 31 & 36 – Wolfgang Amadeus Mozart / Enrique Batiz conductor (Released through Columbia House CD Club.)
- VCD-70446 Sherlock Holmes – Patrick Gowers (Delayed and released as VSD-5221. All discs contain this catalog number)
- VCD-70447 White Mischief – George Fenton (Released in Europe by That's Entertainment Records (TER) and licensed to the US)
- VCD-70451 Return to Snowy River – Bruce Rowland
- VCD-70452 Two Moon Junction – Jonathan Elias (CD release cancelled. Released in 1994 as VSD-5518)
- VCD-70453 Lady In White – Frank LaLoggia (CD release cancelled. Released by East West Records in Europe in 1997 and expanded by Intrada Records around 2018)
- VCD-70454 Dominick and Eugene – Trevor Jones
- VCD-70456 Bad Dreams – Jay Ferguson (Cancelled, later released as part of Varèse Sarabande's LP-to-CD Subscription Series)
- VCD-70457 Dead Heat – Ernest Troost (CD release cancelled)
- VCD-70459 Stand and Deliver – Craig Safan
- VCD-70460 Eight Men Out – Mason Daring / Various Artists
- VCD-70461 D.O.A. – Chaz Jankel
- VCD-70462 Poltergeist III – Joe Renzetti
- VCD-70470 Betrayed – Bill Conti

== 5200–7500 series (1988–2018) ==
Varèse Sarabande partnered with MCA Distribution in 1988. The label adopted the MCA catalog numbering system with the prefix VSD for disc, VSC for cassette, and VSV for video. This ended when Concord Records assumed control of the company in 2018. Catalog numbers without a title are usually assigned to a release that wasn't ready for an official announcement. Older unassigned numbers either experienced a production delay or were canceled.

Varèse Sarabande branched into other music genres during this time with Varèse Spotlight, Varèse Jazz, Varèse Vintage, Water Music, Fuel 2000, and Wildcat. All divisions share the same catalog numbering system, but only the Varèse Sarabande, Spotlight, and Vintage share the same number sequence. Some soundtracks were released as digital download and are not available on CD. The Broadway Musical, Spotlight, and Jazz divisions were closed by 2001.

Colosseum Records was the label's international division located in Nuremberg, Germany. It released all US soundtracks as well as soundtracks for some European films. The German pressings feature different branding. The label would close in 2015.

This series features reissues of LP titles, including titles from the Sony, MCA, Arista Records, Decca, and Bay Cities catalogues.

- VSD-5201 Crossing Delancey – Paul Chihara / the Roches
- VSD-5202 Bat-21 – Christopher Young
- VSD-5203 A Nightmare on Elm Street 4: The Dream Master – Craig Safan (score album)
- VSD-5204 Madame Sousatzka – Gerald Gouriet / Various Artists
- VSD-5205 Halloween 4: The Return of Michael Myers – Alan Howarth
- VSD-5206 Miklos Rozsa: Hollywood Legend – Elmer Bernstein conducts
- VSD-5207 The Prince and the Pauper and Other Themes – Charles Gerhardt conducts
- VSD-5208 Screen Themes – Various Artists / John Scott conducts
- VSD-5209 Wisdom – Danny Elfman
- VSD-5210 Criminal Law – Jerry Goldsmith
- VSD-5211 Cocoon: The Return – James Horner
- VSD-5212 The Spirit of St. Louis – Franz Waxman
- VSD-5213 The Bridge on the River Kwai – Malcolm Arnold
- VSD-5214 The Buccaneer – Elmer Bernstein
- VSD-5215 Talk Radio / Wall Street – Stewart Copeland
- VSD-5216 Farewell to the King – Basil Poledouris
- VSD-5217 The Lion in Winter – John Barry
- VSD-5218 The Quiller Memorandum – John Barry
- VSD-5219 Three Fugitives – David McHugh
- VSD-5220 The Fly II – Christopher Young
- VSD-5221 Sherlock Holmes – Patrick Gowers (Originally VCD-704446; Later pressings were released as VSD-5221)
- VSD-5222 Is Paris Burning? – Maurice Jarre
- VSD-5223 Heathers – David Newman
- VSD-5224 The Alamo – Dimitri Tiomkin
- VSD-5225 War and Peace – Nino Rota
- VSD-5226 Leviathan – Jerry Goldsmith
- VSD-5227 Pet Sematary – Elliot Goldenthal
- VSD-5228 The Fall of the Roman Empire – Dimitri Tiomkin
- VSD-5229 The Chase – John Barry
- VSD-5230 Red Scorpion – Jay Chattaway
- VSD-5231 Cold Feet – Tom Bahler
- VSD-5232 The Old Man and the Sea – Dimitri Tiomkin
- VSD-5233 55 Days at Peking – Dimitri Tiomkin
- VSD-5234 Ginger Ale Afternoon – Willie Dixon
- VSD-5235 The Abyss – Alan Silvestri
- VSD-5236 The Guns of Navarone – Dimitri Tiomkin
- VSD-5237 Wired – Michael Chiklis & the Wired Band / Basil Poledouris
- VSD-5238 A Nightmare on Elm Street 5: The Dream Child – Jay Ferguson (score album)
- VSD-5239 Halloween 5: The Revenge of Michael Myers – Alan Howarth
- VSD-5240 Christine – John Carpenter / Alan Howarth
- VSD-5241 Georges Delerue: The London Sessions: Volume One – Georges Delerue (re-recording with some original tracks)
- VSD-5242 Franz Waxman: Legends of Hollywood: Volume 1 – Franz Waxman / Richard Mills conducts
- VSD-5243 Season of the Witch – John Carpenter / Alan Howarth
- VSD-5244 My Left Foot / Da – Elmer Bernstein
- VSD-5245 Georges Delerue: The London Sessions: Volume Two – Georges Delerue (re-recording with some original tracks)
- VSD-5246 Driving Miss Daisy – Hans Zimmer / Various Artists
- VSD-5247 Shocker – William Goldstein (score album)
- VSD-5248 Music Box – Philippe Sarde
- VSD-5249 Masada – Jerry Goldsmith
- VSD-5250 Dracula – John Williams
- VSD-5251 Firestarter – Tangerine Dream
- VSD-5252 Psycho II – Jerry Goldsmith
- VSD-5253 Enemies, A Love Story – Maurice Jarre
- VSD-5254 Triumph of the Spirit – Cliff Eidelman
- VSD-5255 Stanley & Iris – John Williams
- VSD-5256 Georges Delerue: The London Sessions: Volume Three – Georges Delerue (re-recording with some original tracks)
- VSD-5257 Franz Waxman: Legends of Hollywood: Volume 2 – Franz Waxman / Richard Mills conducts
- VSD-5258 The Egyptian – Alfred Newman / Bernard Herrmann
- VSD-5259 Ghost Story – Philippe Sarde
- VSD-5260 MacArthur – Jerry Goldsmith
- VSD-5261 Explorers – Jerry Goldsmith
- VSD-5262 Earthquake – John Williams
- VSD-5263 Lawrence of Arabia – Maurice Jarre
- VSD-5264 The Fury – John Williams
- VSD-5265 Casino Royale – Burt Bacharach
- VSD-5266 John Carpenter's Greatest Hits: Volume 1 – John Carpenter (Colosseum Europe only release)
- VSD-5267 Total Recall – Jerry Goldsmith
- VSD-5268 Forbidden Zone – Danny Elfman / Oingo Boingo
- VSD-5269 Gremlins 2: The New Batch – Jerry Goldsmith
- VSD-5270 Dead Poets Society / The Mosquito Coast / Witness / The Year of Living Dangerously – Maurice Jarre
- VSD-5271 RoboCop 2 – Leonard Rosenman
- VSD-5272 Back to the Future Part III – Alan Silvestri
- VSD-5273 Die Hard 2: Die Harder – Michael Kamen
- VSD-5274 After Dark, My Sweet – Maurice Jarre
- VSD-5275 Close Encounters of the Third Kind – John Williams
- VSD-5276 Ghost – Maurice Jarre
- VSD-5277 The Eiger Sanction – John Williams
- VSD-5278 The Thing – Ennio Morricone
- VSD-5279 Taxi Driver – Bernard Herrmann / Dave Blume (reissue of the original Arista Records LP)
- VSD-5280 Presumed Innocent – John Williams
- VSD-5281 The Omen – Jerry Goldsmith (Reissue of 1976 LP from)
- VSD-5282 The Final Conflict – Jerry Goldsmith (Reissue of VCD-47242)
- VSD-5283 Hardware – Simon Boswell
- VSD-5284 Desperate Hours – David Mansfield
- VSD-5285 Anthony Adverse (re-recording) – Erich Wolfgang Korngold / John Scott conducts
- VSD-5286 Pacific Heights – Hans Zimmer
- VSD-5287 The Last Butterfly – Alex North / Milan Svoboda (additional music)
- VSD-5288 Miller's Crossing – Carter Burwell
- VSD-5289 White Palace – George Fenton
- VSD-5290 The Grifters – Elmer Bernstein / Cynthia Millar (additional music)
- VSD-5291 Jacob's Ladder – Maurice Jarre
- VSD-5292 The Field – Elmer Bernstein
- VSD-5293 Memphis Belle – George Fenton
- VSD-5294 Henry & June – Mark Adler / Various Artists
- VSD-5295 The Robe – Alfred Newman
- VSD-5296 Torn Curtain – John Addison
- VSD-5297 The Sound and the Fury – Alex North
- VSD-5298 The River – John Williams
- VSD-5299 Mr. Destiny – David Newman
- VSD-5300 Welcome Home, Roxy Carmichael – Thomas Newman
- VSD-5301 Hollywood Soundstage: Big Movie Hits: Volume One – Various Artists
- VSD-5302 Predator 2 – Alan Silvestri
- VSD-5303 Class Action – James Horner
- VSD-5304 The Long Walk Home – George Fenton
- VSD-5305 Kindergarten Cop – Randy Edelman
- VSD-5306 Come See the Paradise – Randy Edelman / Various Artists
- VSD-5307 Almost an Angel – Maurice Jarre
- VSD-5308 Once Around – James Horner / Various Artists
- VSD-5309 Green Card – Hans Zimmer
- VSD-5310 Guilty by Suspicion – James Newton Howard / Various Artists
- VSD-5311 Sinfonietta for Large Orchestra Opus 5 – Erich Wolfgang Korngold / Gerd Albrecht conducts
- VSD-5312 Switch – Henry Mancini (score album)
- VSD-5313 Oscar – Elmer Bernstein
- VSD-5314 La Femme Nikita – Éric Serra
- VSD-5315 The Hard Way – Arthur B. Rubinstein
- VSD-5316 Love Field – Jerry Goldsmith
- VSD-5317 Out for Justice – David Michael Frank / Various Artists
- VSD-5318 Omen IV: The Awakening – Jonathan Sheffer
- VSD2-5319 Seville Film Music Concerts – Maurice Jarre / José Nieto
- VSD-5320 Lifeforce – Henry Mancini
- VSD-5321 City Slickers – Marc Shaiman / Various Artists
- VSD-5322 Soapdish – Alan Silvestri
- VSD-5323 Hudson Hawk – Michael Kamen & Robert Kraft / Various Artists
- VSD-5324 Only the Lonely – Maurice Jarre / Various Artists
- VSD-5325 A Rage in Harlem – Elmer Bernstein
- VSD-5326 Crossing the Line – Ennio Morricone (Released in Europe under the title "The Big Man")
- VSD-5327 Dark Star – John Carpenter (Colosseum Records European, was not released in the US)
- VSD-5328 Jaws 2 – John Williams
- VSD-5329 Symphonic Hollywood – Lee Holdridge / Miklós Rózsa / Richard Kaufman conducts
- VSD-5330 Pure Luck – Jonathan Sheffer / Danny Elfman
- VSD-5331 The Naked Gun / The Naked Gun 2½: The Smell of Fear – Ira Newborn
- VSD-5332 Doc Hollywood – Carter Burwell / Various Artists
- VSD-5333 Freddy's Dead: The Final Nightmare – Brian May (score album)
- VSD-5334 Mobsters – Michael Small
- VSD-5335 Terminator 2: Judgment Day – Brad Fiedel
- VSD-5336 Greatest Hits: Volume 2 – John Carpenter (Colosseum Records European, was not released in the US)
- VSD-5336 Dutch – Alan Silvestri / Various Artists (Cancelled)
- VSD-5337 Body Parts – Loek Dikker
- VSD-5338 Hot Shots! – Sylvester Levay
- VSD-5339 Dead Again – Patrick Doyle
- VSD-5340 The Dark Half – Christopher Young
- VSD-5341 Highway to Hollywood: Big Movie Hits: Volume Two – Various Artists
- VSD-5343 Little Man Tate – Mark Isham
- VSD-5344 Ricochet – Alan Silvestri (The song "Ricochet" performed by Ice-T)
- VSD-5345 Violin Concerto & Flute Concerto – John Williams / Leonard Slatkin conducts
- VSD-5346 Symphony in F-sharp Opus 40 – Erich Wolfgang Korngold / Rudolf Kempe conducts
- VSD-5347 Storyville – Carter Burwell
- VSD-5348 Father of the Bride – Alan Silvestri (Featuring songs by Steve Tyrell)
- VSD-5349 Black Robe – Georges Delerue
- VSD-5350 Medicine Man – Jerry Goldsmith
- VSD-5351 Hollywood Chronicle: Great Movie Classics: Volume One – Various Artists
- VSD-5352 Article 99 – Danny Elfman
- VSD-5353 The Empire Strikes Back – John Williams / Charles Gerhardt conducts (reissue of VCD 47204)
- VSD-5354 K2 – Hans Zimmer (European version)
- VSD-5355 Memoirs of an Invisible Man – Shirley Walker
- VSD-5356 Final Analysis – George Fenton
- VSD-5357 Death in Venice – Various Artists
- VSD 5357 Bed & Breakfast – David Shire (released as XCD-1008 as part of their Colossal Records series due to error)
- VSD-5359 The Great Mouse Detective – Henry Mancini
- VSD-5360 Basic Instinct – Jerry Goldsmith
- VSD-5361 Hollywood Backlot: Big Movie Hits: Volume Three – Various Artists
- VSD-5362 Evil Dead – Joseph LoDuca (Colosseum only release, not released in the US)
- VSD-5362 Rock-a-Doodle – Robert Folk / T.J. Kunstler (Cancelled. Released in Germany. Later expanded by Quartet Records)
- VSD-5363 Nightmare Cafe – J. Peter Robinson / Various Artists
- VSD-5364 My Cousin Vinny – Randy Edelman
- VSD-5365 Year of the Comet – Hummie Mann
- VSD-5366 The Player – Thomas Newman
- VSD-5367 A Little Romance – Georges Delerue
- VSD-5368 Agnes of God – Georges Delerue
- VSD-5369 Man Trouble – Georges Delerue
- VSD-5370 Rich in Love – Georges Delerue
- VSD-5371 Of Mice and Men – Mark Isham
- VSD-5372 The Linguini Incident – Thomas Newman / Various Artists
- VSD-5373 Universal Soldier – Christopher Franke
- VSD-5374 The Public Eye – Mark Isham
- VSD-5375 Death Becomes Her – Alan Silvestri
- VSD-5376 Sketch Artist – Mark Isham
- VSD-5377 Johnny Guitar – Victor Young
- VSD-5378 Rio Grande – Victor Young / Sons of the Pioneers
- VSD-5379 Diggstown – James Newton Howard
- VSD-5380 Unforgiven – Lennie Niehaus / Clint Eastwood
- VSD-5381 The Young Indiana Jones Chronicles: Volume One – Laurence Rosenthal / Joel McNeely
- VSD-5382 Cool World – Mark Isham
- VSD-5383 Mr. Baseball – Jerry Goldsmith
- VSD-5384 Nails – Bill Conti
- VSD-5385 Mom and Dad Save the World – Jerry Goldsmith
- VSD-5386 Breaking the Rules – Hidden Faces / David Kitay
- VSD-5387 Film Classics – Various Artists (Colosseum only release, not released in the US)
- VSD-5387 Whispers in the Dark – Thomas Newman (Cancelled)
- VSD-5388 Rapid Fire – Christopher Young
- VSD-5389 Christopher Columbus: The Discovery – Cliff Eidelman
- VSD-5390 Conan the Barbarian – Basil Poledouris
- VSD-5391 The Young Indiana Jones Chronicles: Volume Two – Laurence Rosenthal / Joel McNeely
- VSD-5392 Conan the Destroyer – Basil Poledouris
- VSD-5393 New Music for Films: Volume One – Christopher Franke
- VSD-5394 The Lover – Gabriel Yared
- VSD-5395 Dust Devil – Simon Boswell (Colosseum only release) (Some CD inserts have a printing error)
- VSD-5396 Blood In Blood Out (Bound by Honor) – Bill Conti (Produced, but cancelled. Some copies exist.)
- VSD-5397 Indochine – Patrick Doyle
- VSD-5398 Arnold: Great Music from His Films – Various Artists
- VSD-5399 The London Concert – Christopher Franke
- VSD-5400 2001: A Space Odyssey (The Unused Score) – Alex North / Jerry Goldsmith conducts
- VSD-5401 The Young Indiana Jones Chronicles: Volume Three – Laurence Rosenthal / Joel McNeely
- VSD-5402 The Distinguished Gentleman – Randy Edelman
- VSD2-5403 The Young Lions / This Earth Is Mine – Hugo Friedhofer
- VSD-5404 Untamed Heart – Cliff Eidelman
- VSD-5405 Lust for Life / Background to Violence Suite (The Killers / Brute Force / Naked City) – Miklós Rózsa
- VSD-5406 Damage – Zbigniew Preisner
- VSD-5407 Themes From Classic Sci-Fi, Fantasy & Horror Films – Various Artists / Dick Jacobs conducts
- VSD-5408 Matinee – Jerry Goldsmith
- VSD-5409 Under Siege – Gary Chang
- VSD-5410 The Temp – Frédéric Talgorn
- VSD-5411 Army of Darkness – Joseph LoDuca (Featuring the "March of the Dead" theme composed by Danny Elfman)
- VSD-5412 The Cemetery Club – Elmer Bernstein
- VSD-5413 Orlando – David Motion / Sally Potter
- VSD-5414 Touch of Evil – Henry Mancini
- VSD-5415 Mad Dog and Glory – Elmer Bernstein
- VSD-5416 RoboCop 3 – Basil Poledouris
- VSD-5417 Fire in the Sky – Mark Isham
- VSD-5418 The Adventures of Huck Finn – Bill Conti
- VSD-5419 Lost in Yonkers – Elmer Bernstein
- VSD-5420 Othello – Angelo Francesco Lavagnino / Alberto Bargeris conducts
- VSD-5421 The Young Indiana Jones Chronicles: Volume Four – Laurence Rosenthal / Joel McNeely
- VSD-5422 Anastasia – Alfred Newman
- VSD-5423 Rich Man, Poor Man – Alex North
- VSD-5424 Equinox – Various Artists
- VSD-5425 King of the Hill – Cliff Martinez / Various Artists
- VSD-5426 Hot Shots! Part Deux – Basil Poledouris
- VSD-5427 Freddy's Favorites: The Best of A Nightmare on Elm Street – Charles Bernstein / Christopher Young / Angelo Badalamenti / Craig Safan / Jay Ferguson / Brian May
- VSD-5432 Josh and S.A.M. – Thomas Newman / Various Artists
- VSD-5433 Unsung Sondheim – Stephen Sondheim
- VSD-5434 Anywhere I Wander: Liz Callaway Sings Frank Loesser – Liz Callaway
- VSD-5435 M. Butterfly – Howard Shore
- VSD-5436 Airport – Alfred Newman
- VSD-5437 Toonful – Michelle Nicastro
- VSD-5438 Needful Things – Patrick Doyle
- VSD-5439 Prettybelle (1993 original cast starring Angela Lansbury) – Bob Merrill & Jule Styne
- VSD-5440 Bring Back Birdie (1993 original cast) – Charles Strouse & Lee Adams
- VSD-5441 A Norman Rockwell Christmas – Pacific Chorale / All-American Boys Chorus
- VSD-5442 Malice – Jerry Goldsmith
- VSD-5443 The Secret Garden – Zbigniew Preisner
- VSD-5444 The Saint of Fort Washington – James Newton Howard
- VSD-5445 Hard Target – Graeme Revell featuring Kodō
- VSD-5446 Rudy – Jerry Goldsmith
- VSD-5447 Demolition Man – Elliot Goldenthal (score album)
- VSD-5448 Body Bags – John Carpenter / Jim Lang
- VSD-5449 And the Band Played On – Carter Burwell
- VSD-5450 The Real McCoy – Brad Fiedel
- VSD-5451 The Secret Garden (1993 world premiere cast recording) – Alfred Shaughnessy & Sharon Burgess
- VSD-5452 Part of Your World: Debbie Shapiro Gravitte Sings Alan Menken – Debbie Shapiro Gravitte
- VSD-5453 Sugar Babies (1993 OCR starring Mickey Rooney & Ann Miller) – Jimmy McHugh & Dorothy Fields
- VSD-5454 Farewell My Concubine – Zhao Jiping
- VSD-5455 Once Upon a Time in China: Volume One – Various Artists
- VSD-5456 Younger and Younger – Hans Zimmer / Alex Wurman
- VSD-5457 The Wedding Banquet – Mader
- VSD-5458 20 All-Time Movie Hits Video Hit Collection '93 – Various Artists (Colosseum Records release, not released in US)
- VSD-5458 The Good Son – Elmer Bernstein (Cancelled. Subsequently, released by Fox Movie Scores)
- VSD-5459 Wall Street / Talk Radio – Stewart Copeland (Reissue of VSD-5215)
- VSD-5460 Flesh and Bone – Thomas Newman / Various Artists
- VSD-5461 Lucky Stiff (1993 OCR) – Stephen Flaherty & Lynn Ahrens
- VSD-5462 Unsung Musicals – Various Artists
- VSD-5463 Carlito's Way – Patrick Doyle (score album)
- VSD-5464 She Loves Me (1993 OCR) – Jerry Bock & Sheldon Harnick
- VSD-5465 Addams Family Values – Marc Shaiman (score album)
- VSD-5466 Timon of Athens (1963 original theatrical score) – Duke Ellington / Stanley Silverman conducts
- VSD-5467 Iron Will – Joel McNeely
- VSD-5468 On Deadly Ground – Basil Poledouris
- VSD-5469 Angie – Jerry Goldsmith
- VSD-5470 Golden Gate – Elliot Goldenthal
- VSD-5471 Mrs. Parker and the Vicious Circle – Mark Isham
- VSD-5472 Just in Time: Judy Kuhn Sings Jule Styne – Judy Kuhn
- VSD-5473 Collette Collage: 2 Musicals About Collette (1993 OCR) – Harvey Schmidt & Tom Jones
- VSD-5474 I'll Do Anything – Hans Zimmer
- VSD-5474 Mother's Boys – George S. Clinton (Cancelled)
- VSD-5475 Lost in Boston (Rejected songs from major musicals) – Various Artists
- VSD-5476 Ruthless! The Musical – Joel Paley/Marvin Laird
- VSD-5477 The Hudsucker Proxy – Carter Burwell
- VSD-5478 Wipe Out! The Best of the Surfaris – the Surfaris
- VSD-5479 Being Human – Michael Gibbs
- VSD-5480 Franz Waxman: Legends of Hollywood: Volume 3 – Richard Mills conducts
- VSD-5481 The Surfing Songbook – Rincon Surfside Band
- VSD-5482 This Heart of Mine – Mary Cleere Haran
- VSD-5483 No Escape – Graeme Revell
- VSD-5484 Lionheart – Jerry Goldsmith (Condensed version)
- VSD-5485 Lost in Boston II (More rejected songs from major musicals) – Various Artists
- VSD-5486 A Celebration of Soul: Volume One – Various Artists
- VSD-5487 Widows' Peak – Carl Davis
- VSD-5488 Kinky Friedman – Kinky Friedman
- VSD-5489 A Group Called Smith – Smith
- VSD-5490 From a Girl's Point of View – Love Unlimited
- VSD-5491 Pipeline – the Chantays
- VSD-5492 I Love You – Eddie Holman
- VSD-5493 Bend Me, Shape Me: The Best of the American Breed – the American Breed
- VSD-5494 A Celebration of Soul: Volume Two – Various Artists
- VSD-5495 Leprechaun 2 – Jonathan Elias
- VSD-5496 The Stand – W. G. Snuffy Walden
- VSD-5497 Samson and Delilah / The Quiet Man – Victor Young
- VSD-5498 Hans Christian Andersen / The Court Jester – Danny Kaye
- VSD-5499 The Crow – Graeme Revell (score album)
- VSD-5500 A Streetcar Named Desire – Alex North / Jerry Goldsmith conducts (re-recording)
- VSD-5501 The Avengers: The Television and Movie Music of Laurie Johnson (reissue) – Laurie Johnson
- VSD-5502 Renaissance Man – Hans Zimmer
- VSD-5503 All Rock 'N' Roll Oldies: Volume One – L. A. Version (KCBS) – Various Artists
- VSD-5505 All Rock 'N' Roll Oldies: Volume One – L. A. Version (WARW) – Various Artists
- VSD-5506 All Rock 'N' Roll Oldies: Volume One – L. A. Version (KRRW) – Various Artists
- VSD-5510 I Love Trouble – David Newman
- VSD-5511 Where Were You When I Needed You – the Grass Roots
- VSD-5512 The Road to Wellville – Rachel Portman / Various Artists
- VSD-5514 Ain't It the Truth: The Best of Mary Wells 1964-1982 – Mary Wells
- VSD-5515 Nothing Can Stop Me: Gene Chandler's Greatest Hits – Gene Chandler
- VSD-5516 Rodgers & Hammerstein's A Grand Night for Singing (1994 OCR) – Richard Rodgers & Oscar Hammerstein II
- VSD-5517 A Broadway Christmas – Various Artists
- VSD-5518 Two Moon Junction – Jonathan Elias
- VSD-5519 Raw Deal – Cinemascore
- VSD-5520 The Epoch Collection – Rupert Holmes
- VSD-5521 Beyond the Blue Horizon: More of the Best of Lou Christie – Lou Christie
- VSD-5522 More Greatest Hits – Pat Boone
- VSD-5523 Dark Moon: The Best of Gale Storm – Gale Storm
- VSD-5524 P.S. I Love You: The Best of the Hilltoppers – the Hilltoppers featuring Jimmy Sacca
- VSD-5525 Melody of Love: The Best of Billy Vaughn – Billy Vaughn
- VSD-5526 Hearts of Stone: The Best of the Fontane Sisters – the Fontane Sisters
- VSD-5527 Heartbeats (1994 OCR) – Amanda McBroom
- VSD-5528 Eat Drink Man Woman – Mader
- VSD-5529 Our Private World: Sally Mayes Sings Comden & Green – Sally Mayes
- VSD-5530 Days of Wine & Roses: The Classic Songs of Henry Mancini – Michael Lang
- VSD-5531 Hollywood '94 – Various Artists / Joel McNeely conducts, Seattle Symphony Orchestra
- VSD-5532 Timecop – Mark Isham
- VSD-5533 Wagon's East! – Michael Small
- VSD-5534 Rhythm of the Rain – Various Artists
- VSD-5535 Bubblegum Classics: Volume One – Various Artists
- VSD-5536 The War Lord – Jerome Moross
- VSD-5537 Reel Imagination – Michelle Nicastro
- VSD-5538 A Simple Twist of Fate – Cliff Eidelman
- VSD-5539 Laughter in the Rain: The Best of Neil Sedaka – Neil Sedaka
- VSD-5540 The Cowboys – John Williams
- VSD-5541 The Secret of NIMH – Jerry Goldsmith (Reissue of VCD-47231 with new artwork and the album tracks resequenced)
- VSD-5542 The Best Little Whorehouse Goes Public (1994 OCR) – Carol Hall
- VSD-5543 Exotica – Mychael Danna
- VSD-5544 Princess Caraboo – Richard Hartley
- VSD-5545 Widescreen – Rupert Holmes
- VSD-5546 Terminal Velocity – Joel McNeely
- VSD-5547 I Never Told You: Fred Hersch Plays the Music of Johnny Mandel – Fred Hersch
- VSD-5548 Merrily We Roll Along (1994 OCR) – Stephen Sondheim
- VSD-5549 Tuneweaver – Neil Sedaka
- VSD-5550 The Christmas Touch – Johnny Tillotson
- VSD-5551 Fahrenheit 451 – Bernard Herrmann / Joel McNeely conducts, Seattle Symphony Orchestra
- VSD-5552 Slow, Hot Wind – Fred Hersch / Janis Siegel
- VSD-5553 Exit to Eden – Patrick Doyle
- VSD-5554 War of the Buttons – Rachel Portman
- VSD-5555 Trapped in Paradise – Robert Folk
- VSD-5556 Passion... in Jazz – Stephen Sondheim / the Trotter Trio
- VSD-5557 Hello, Dolly! (1994 30th-anniversary original cast recording starring Carol Channing) – Jerry Herman
- VSD-5558 Junior – James Newton Howard
- VSD-5559 Souvenirs de Voyage / Echoes – Bernard Herrmann (Reissue of Bay Cities release)
- VSD-5560 Street Fighter – Graeme Revell (score album)
- VSD-5561 Blood & Thunder: Hollywood's Most Famous Epics – Cliff Eidelman conducts
- VSD-5562 Sax and Violence: Music from the Dark Side of the Screen – Various Artists / Lanny Meyers conductor / performer
- VSD-5563 Lost In Boston III (Even more rejected songs from major musicals) – Various Artists
- VSD-5564 Unsung Musicals II – Various Artists
- VSD-5565 SeaQuest DSV – John Debney
- VSD-5566 The Best of Ed Bruce – Ed Bruce
- VSD-5567 The Best of Donna Fargo – Donna Fargo
- VSD-5568 The Best of Joe Stampley – Joe Stampley
- VSD-5569 More Greatest Hits – Gene Pitney
- VSD-5570 Poetry in Motion: The Best of Johnny Tillotson – Johnny Tillotson
- VSD-5572 So You Are a Star: The Best of the Hudson Brothers – the Hudson Brothers
- VSD-5573 Lone Wolf McQuade – Francesco De Masi
- VSD-5574 Help Me Make It Through the Night: The Best of Sammi Smith – Sammi Smith
- VSD-5575 Bubblegum Classics: Volume Two – Various Artists
- VSD-5576 The Best of Dick & Dee Dee – Dick St. John & Dee Dee Sperling
- VSD-5577 The Best of Fabian – Fabian
- VSD-5578 The History of Cadence Records: Volume One – Various Artists
- VSD-5579 The History of Cadence Records: Volume Two – Various Artists
- VSD-5580 Last Boogie in Paris – Johnny Rivers & His L. A. Boogie Band
- VSD-5581 Drop Zone – Hans Zimmer
- VSD-5582 Richie Rich – Alan Silvestri
- VSD-5583 The Andrew Lloyd Webber Album – Laurie Beechman
- VSD-5584 This Funny World: Mary Cleere Haran Sings Lyrics by Hart – Mary Cleere Haran
- VSD-5585 The Story Goes On: On & Off Broadway – Liz Callaway
- VSD-5586 Loving You: Paige O'Hara Sings Jerry Herman – Paige O'Hara
- VSD-5587 The Underneath – Cliff Martinez / Various Artists
- VSD-5588 Surfaris Stomp – the Surfaris
- VSD-5589 Diva by Diva: Legendary Ladies of Broadway – Judy Kaye
- VSD-5590 Teen Suite: Best of 1958-1962 – Jan & Dean
- VSD-5591 Listen, Listen: The Best of Emitt Rhodes – Emitt Rhodes
- VSD-5592 Sweet and Lovely: The Best of Nino Tempo & April Stevens – Nino Tempo & April Stevens
- VSD-5593 Das Barbecü (1995 original cast) – Scott Warrender / Jim Luigs
- VSD-5594 The Best of Frankie Avalon – Frankie Avalon
- VSD-5595 The Quick and the Dead – Alan Silvestri
- VSD-5596 Just Cause – James Newton Howard
- VSD-5597 The Mystery of Edwin Drood (1995 OCR) – Rupert Holmes
- VSD-5598 Sentimental Me: The Best of the Ames Brothers – the Ames Brothers
- VSD-5599 Outbreak – James Newton Howard
- VSD-5600 Vertigo – Bernard Herrmann / Joel McNeely conducts (re-recording) the Royal Scottish National Orchestra
- VSD-5601 Citizen X – Randy Edelman
- VSD-5602 Dolores Claiborne – Danny Elfman
- VSD-5603 Stephen Sondheim's Sweeney Todd in Jazz – Stephen Sondheim / the Trotter Trio
- VSD-5604 Radio Gals (1995 OCR) – Mike Craver & Mark Hardwick
- VSD-5605 Country Hits Through the Years: The '50s – Various Artists
- VSD-5606 Country Hits Through the Years: The '60s – Various Artists
- VSD-5607 Country Hits Through the Years: The '70s – Various Artists
- VSD-5608 Roy Clark Greatest Hits – Roy Clark
- VSD-5609 B.J.Thomas More Greatest Hits – B.J. Thomas
- VSD-5610 Blue Lady: The Nashville Sessions – Petula Clark
- VSD-5611 Jealous Kind of Fella – Garland Green
- VSD-5612 Drums! Drums! A-Go-Go – Hal Blaine
- VSD-5613 Mr. Spock's Music from Outer Space – Leonard Nimoy
- VSD-5614 The Transformed Man – William Shatner
- VSD-5615 The Best of Terri Gibbs – Terri Gibbs
- VSD-5616 Music! Music! Music!: The Best of Teresa Brewer – Teresa Brewer
- VSD-5617 The Four Aces More Greatest Hits – the Four Aces
- VSD-5618 Treat Her Right: The Best of Roy Head – Roy Head
- VSD-5619 There'll Come a Time – Betty Everett
- VSD-5620 A Pyromaniac's Love Story / Great Moments in Aviation / Smoke / Ethan Frome – Rachel Portman
- VSD-5621 A Hollywood Christmas – Various Artists
- VSD-5622 Shakespeare on Broadway – Various Artists
- VSD-5623 No One is Alone: Songs of Inspiration and Hope from Broadway – Laurie Beechman
- VSD-5624 Cinemotions – Various Artists
- VSD-5625 1976 Concert in Japan – Micky Dolenz, Davy Jones, Tommy Boyce & Bobby Hart
- VSD-5626 Love Me With All Your Heart – Ray Charles with the Ray Charles Singers
- VSD-5627 While You Were Sleeping – Randy Edelman
- VSD-5628 A Little Princess – Patrick Doyle
- VSD-5629 Village of the Damned – John Carpenter / Dave Davies
- VSD-5630 Once Upon a Time in the Cinema – Ennio Morricone / Lanny Meyers conducts
- VSD-5631 Henry, Sweet Henry (1967 OCR starring Don Ameche) – Bob Merrill
- VSD2-5632 Unsung Irving Berlin – Various Artists
- VSD-5633 Gold Diggers: The Secret of Bear Mountain – Joel McNeely
- VSD-5634 Not of This Earth!: The Film Music of Ronald Stein – Ronald Stein
- VSD-5635 Arrow 93FM All Rock & Roll Oldies – Volume Two – Various Artists
- VSD-5636 Persuasive Percussion – Terry Snyder and his All-Stars / Enoch Light
- VSD-5637 Provocative Percussion – the Command All-Stars / Enoch Light
- VSD-5638 On the Waterfront: On Broadway (1995 cast recording) – David Amram
- VSD-5639 Jazz Goes to Hollywood: The Sixties – Various Artists / Fred Karlin conducts
- VSD-5640 Toonful, Too – Michelle Nicastro
- VSD-5641 Voyages: The Film Music Journeys of Alan Silvestri – Alan Silvestri (Featuring music from Romancing the Stone)
- VSD-5642 Chapter 8 – Chapter 8 featuring Anita Baker
- VSD-5643 Whispering Bill: The Greatest Hits of Bill Anderson – Bill Anderson
- VSD-5644 I Like Your Kind of Love: The Cadence Sessions – Andy Williams
- VSD-5645 Legend – Tangerine Dream / Bryan Ferry, Jon Anderson (songs)
- VSD-5646 To Die For – Danny Elfman
- VSD-5647 Anything Goes: Rebecca Luker Sings Cole Porter – Rebecca Luker
- VSD-5648 Under Siege 2: Dark Territory – Basil Poledouris ("After the Train is Gone" performed by actor Steven Seagal)
- VSD-5649 Jeffery – Stephen Endelman / Various Artists
- VSD-5650 Lost Civilizations – Joe Delia (Cancelled. Released as an agency promotional CD for the composer)
- VSD-5651 Picture Bride – Cliff Eidelman (Rejected score)
- VSD-5652 Doing Something Right: Randy Graff Sings Cy Coleman – Randy Graff
- VSD-5653 Arrow 95.7 Rock & Roll Classics – Various Artists
- VSD-5655 All Rock and Roll Oldies: Volume 2 – Various Artists
- VSD-5656 Arrow 93.7 FM Rock & Roll Classics – Various Artists
- VSD-5658 Cliffhangers! Music from Republic Films – James King conducts
- VSD-5659 Magic in the Water – David Schwartz
- VSD-5660 Hercules: The Legendary Journeys – Joseph LoDuca
- VSD-5661 Babe – Nigel Westlake / Various Artists
- VSD-5662 The Net – Mark Isham
- VSD-5663 Sudden Death – John Debney
- VSD-5664 Something to Talk About – Hans Zimmer / Graham Preskett
- VSD-5665 Ethel Merman's Broadway (1995 OCR starring Rita McKenzie) – Various Artists
- VSD-5666 Shoot'Em Ups! Music from Republic Serials – James King conducts
- VSD-5667 The Stars Fell on Henrietta – David Benoit
- VSD-5668 Spirit in the Sky: The Best of Norman Greenbaum – Norman Greenbaum
- VSD-5669 Forbidden Hollywood (1995 original cast) Gerard Alessandrini
- VSD-5670 Words & Music: Songs of Tommy Boyce & Bobby Hart – Tommy Boyce & Bobby Hart
- VSD-5671 Hollywood '95 – Various Artists / Joel McNeely conducts
- VSD-5672 Mighty Morphin Power Rangers: The Movie – Graeme Revell (score album)
- VSD-5673 Company... in Jazz – Stephen Sondheim / the Trotter Trio
- VSD-5674 The Adjuster / Speaking Parts / Family Viewing – Mychael Danna
- VSD-5675 Now and Then – Cliff Eidelman (score album)
- VSD-5676 Broadway Bound: New Writers For Musical Theatre – Various Artists
- VSD-5677 Chinatown – Jerry Goldsmith
- VSD-5678 Halloween: The Curse of Michael Myers – Alan Howarth
- VSD-5679 Frankie Starlight – Elmer Bernstein
- VSD-5680 You're the One: The Best of the Vogues – the Vogues
- VSD-5682 John Travolta Sings – John Travolta
- VSD-5683 When I Dream – Helen Reddy
- VSD-5684 Even Stevens – Ray Stevens
- VSD-5685 Gitarzan – Ray Stevens
- VSD-5686 History of Dot Records: Volume One: Young Love – Various Artists
- VSD-5687 History of Dot Records: Volume Two: Come Go with Me – Various Artists
- VSD-5688 John & Jen (1996 OCR) – Andrew Lippa & Tom Greenwald
- VSD-5689 Othello – Charlie Mole
- VSD-5690 The Best of the Beatles Songbook – the Hollyridge Strings
- VSD-5691 The Jean-Claude Van Damme Action Collection – Various Artists (Colosseum Records European release, not issued in the US)
- VSD-5692 Sherlock Holmes: Classic Themes from 221 B Baker Street – Lanny Meyers conducts
- VSD-5693 Hi-Fi Music for Influentials – Steve Allen
- VSD-5694 Nice Work if You Can Get It: The Best of the Hi-Lo's – the Hi-Lo's
- VSD-5695 The Sun Sessions – Charlie Rich
- VSD-5696 The Private Lives of Elizabeth and Essex – Erich Wolfgang Korngold / Carl Davis conducts
- VSD-5697 Sugar Shack: The Best of Jimmy Gilmer and the Fireballs – Jimmy Gilmer and the Fireballs
- VSD-5698 Lawnmower Man 2: Beyond Cyberspace – Robert Folk
- VSD-5699 City Hall – Jerry Goldsmith
- VSDE-5700 Star Wars: Shadows of the Empire – Joel McNeely / John Williams ("Star Wars Theme")
- VSD-5701 It's My Party – Basil Poledouris / Olivia Newton-John (songs)
- VSD-5702 Dark Shadows: 30th Anniversary Collection – Bob Cobert
- VSD-5703 On the Air! The Classic Comedy of Steve Allen – Steve Allen
- VSD-5704 History of Challenge Records – Various Artists
- VSD-5705 Dick Bartley Presents Collector's Essentials: Volume One: The '60s – Various Artists
- VSD-5706 Dick Bartley Presents Collector's Essentials: Volume Two: The 70s – Various Artists
- VSD-5707 A Funny Thing Happened on the Way to the Forum... in Jazz – Stephen Sondheim / the Trotter Trio
- VSD-5708 99.5 FM the Hawk: All Rock & Roll Hits – Various Artists
- VSD-5709 Cinema Soundtrack Hits – Various Artists (Colosseum Records European release, not issued in the US)
- VSD-5710 Cinema Soundtrack Classics – Various Artists (Colosseum Records European release, not issued in the US)
- VSD-5711 You're Never Fully Dressed Without a Smile: Jason Graae Sings Charles Strouse – Jason Graae
- VSD-5712 The Thorn Birds II: The Missing Years – Henry Mancini / Garry McDonald / Lawrence Stone
- VSD-5713 Franz Waxman: Legends of Hollywood: Volume 4 – Franz Waxman, Richard Mills conducts
- VSD-5714 Executive Decision – Jerry Goldsmith
- VSD-5715 London Pride: Songs of the London Stage – Twiggy
- VSD-5716 The Quest – Randy Edelman
- VSD-5717 Magic Moments: The Classic Songs of Gerry and the Pacemakers – Gerry and the Pacemakers
- VSD-5718 Soulful Pop – Various Artists
- VSD-5719 Bubblegum Classics: Volume Three – Various Artists
- VSD-5720 Mrs. Winterbourne – Patrick Doyle
- VSD-5721 Drat! The Cat! (1997 OCR) – Ira Levin & Milton Schafer
- VSD-5722 The Musical Adventures of Peter Pan – Various Artists
- VSD-5723 Cool & Classic: Great Film Themes of the '60s – Fred Karlin conducts
- VSD-5724 The Best of Bo Donaldson and the Heywoods – Bo Donaldson and the Heywoods
- VSD-5725 Love Grows (Where My Rosemary Goes): The Voice of Tony Burrows – Tony Burrows
- VSD-5726 Wax, Board & Woodie: Surf & Hot Rod – Various Artists
- VSD-5727 Golden Summer Days: The Legendary Masked Surfers – Jan & Dean
- VSD-5728 Tales from the Crypt Presents: Bordello of Blood – Chris Boardman (score album)
- VSD-5729 Bed & Sofa (1996 OCR) – Polly Pen & Laurence Klavan
- VSD-5730 I Do! I Do! (1996 OCR) – Tom Jones & Harvey Schmidt
- VSD-5731 The Beast – Don Davis
- VSD-5732 The Craft – Graeme Revell (score album)
- VSD-5733 That's the Way Love Goes: The Final Recordings of Lefty Frizzell – Lefty Frizzell
- VSD-5734 Momma, Gimme a Drink of Water – Didi Conn / Milton Schafer
- VSD-5735 The Michel Legrand Album – the Trotter Trio
- VSD-5736 The Songs of Steven Allen – Various Artists
- VSD-5737 One More Tomorrow: The Best of Henry Gross – Henry Gross featuring "Shannon"
- VSD-5738 The Seattle Years 1978-1984 – Iain Matthews
- VSD-5739 Midnight Mission – Carla Olson & the Textones
- VSD-5740 Cowgirls (1996 OCR) – Mary Murfitt
- VSD-5741 The Alan Menken Album – Debbie Shapiro Gravitte
- VSD-5742 The MGM Album – Debbie Shapiro Gravitte
- VSD-5743 Under Paris Skies – Andy Williams
- VSD-5744 Maybe ... Maybe Not – Torsten Breuer / Max Raabe
- VSD-5745 Alaska – Reg Powell (Cancelled)
- VSD-5746 Chain Reaction – Jerry Goldsmith
- VSD-5747 1966-1979: The Best of Hank Thompson – Hank Thompson
- VSD-5748 The Harper Valley P.T.A.: The Best of Jeannie C. Riley – Jeannie C. Riley
- VSD-5749 The Chad Mitchell Trio Collection – the Chad Mitchell Trio
- VSD-5750 Xena: Warrior Princess – Joseph LoDuca
- VSD-5751 American Buffalo / Threesome – Thomas Newman
- VSD-5752 Romeo & Juliet: Shakespearean Classics from Stage and Screen – Cliff Eidelman conducts, Royal Scottish National Orchestra
- VSD-5753 The Alien Trilogy – Jerry Goldsmith / James Horner / Elliot Goldenthal – Cliff Eidelman conducts
- VSD-5754 To Kill a Mockingbird – Elmer Bernstein conducts, (re-recording with Royal Scottish National Orchestra)
- VSD-5755 Last Man Standing – Elmer Bernstein (Rejected score)
- VSD-5756 Maximum Risk – Robert Folk
- VSD-5757 Bulletproof – Elmer Bernstein
- VSD-5758 The Chamber – Carter Burwell
- VSD-5759 Vertigo (Original film tracks) – Bernard Herrmann / Muir Mathieson conducts
- VSD-5760 Cool & Classic: Great Film Themes of the '70s – Fred Karlin conducts
- VSD-5761 Stephen King's Thinner – Daniel Licht
- VSD-5762 Star Trek: 30th Birthday Edition – Fred Steiner conducts
- VSD-5763 The King and I (1996 OCR starring Lou Diamond Phillips) – Richard Rodgers & Oscar Hammerstein II
- VSD-5764 Hollywood '96 – Various Artists / Joel McNeely conducts the Royal Scottish National Orchestra
- VSD-5765 Psycho – Bernard Herrmann / Joel McNeely conducts (re-recording)
- VSD-5766 The Batman Trilogy – Danny Elfman / Elliot Goldenthal / Neal Hefti / Joel McNeely conducts
- VSD-5767 Extreme Measures – Danny Elfman
- VSD-5768 Lost in Boston IV (Additional songs rejected from major musicals) – Various Artists
- VSD-5769 Unsung Musicals III – Various Artists
- VSD-5770 Highlights From Unsung Irving Berlin – Various Artists
- VSD-5771 I Love You, You're Perfect, Now Change (1996 original cast) – Joe DiPietro & Jimmy Roberts
- VSD-5772 Hey, Love: The Songs of Mary Rodgers (1997 original cast starring Faith Prince) – Various Artists
- VSD-5773 The Best of Halloween 1-6 – John Carpenter / Alan Howarth
- VSD-5774 The Very Best of the Platters – the Platters
- VSD-5775 Down to Earth – Jimmy Buffett
- VSD-5776 High Cumberland Jubilee – Jimmy Buffett
- VSD-5777 The Very Best of Chuck Jackson – Chuck Jackson
- VSD-5778 Johns – Danny Caron / Charles Brown
- VSD-5779 Set It Off – Christopher Young (score album)
- VSD-5780 Mother Night – Michael Convertino
- VSD-5781 The First Wives Club – Marc Shaiman (score album)
- VSD-5782 The '50s Remembered: The Pop Vocalists Era – Dick Haymes / Alan Dale / Johnny Desmond / Don Cherry
- VSD-5783 The '50s Remembered: The Pop Vocalists Era – Toni Arden / Kitty Kallen / Jane Morgan / Sylvia Syms
- VSD-5784 La Paloma – Billy Vaughn
- VSD-5785 Vintage Rock – Bill Deal and the Rhondels
- VSD-5786 Then You Can Tell Me Goodbye: The Best of the Casinos – the Casinos
- VSD-5787 Let's All Chant: The Michael Zager Dance Collection – Michael Zager
- VSD-5788 Moog: The Electric Eclectics of Dick Hyman – Dick Hyman
- VSD-5789 The Ernie Kovacs Record Collection – Ernie Kovacs
- VSD-5790 Cugie A-Go-Go – Xavier Cugat
- VSD-5791 Blast Off – Ferrante & Teicher
- VSD-5792 Fierce Creatures – Jerry Goldsmith
- VSD-5793 Dante's Peak – John Frizzell / James Newton Howard
- VSD-5794 Sketches on Star Wars – John Williams / the Trotter Trio
- VSD-5795 The Sand Pebbles – Jerry Goldsmith (re-recording), Goldsmith conducts the Royal Scottish National Orchestra
- VSD-5796 Patton / Tora! Tora! Tora! – Jerry Goldsmith (re-recording) Goldsmith conducts
- VSD-5797 The Charming Miss Edie Adams – Edie Adams
- VSD-5798 Chicago... and All That Jazz – the Brad Ellis Group
- VSD-5800 Who's Afraid of Virginia Woolf? – Alex North / Jerry Goldsmith conducts
- VSD-5801 Sunshine Days Pop '60s Classics: Volume One – Various Artists
- VSD-5802 Sunshine Days Pop '60s Classics: Volume Two – Various Artists
- VSD-5803 Sunshine Days Pop '60s Classics: Volume Three – Various Artists
- VSD-5804 You Gotta Have Heart: The Songs of Richard Adler – Marlene VerPlanck
- VSD-5805 Sondheim at the Movies – Various Artists
- VSD-5806 Citizen Kane – Bernard Herrmann / Joel McNeely conducts, the Royal Scottish National Orchestra
- VSD-5807 The Towering Inferno: Great Disaster Classics – Various Artists / Joel McNeely & John Debney conducts the Royal Scottish National Orchestra
- VSD-5808 Absolute Power – Lennie Niehaus / Clint Eastwood
- VSD-5810 On My Own: Michelle Nicastro on Broadway – Michelle Nicastro
- VSD-5811 Unique Original RKO Masters – the Vagabonds
- VSD-5812 Unique Original RKO Masters – the Harmonicats
- VSD-5813 The Very Best of B. J. Thomas – B. J. Thomas
- VSD-5815 No Way to Treat a Lady (1997 OCR) – Douglas J. Cohen
- VSD-5816 Out of Africa – John Barry / Joel McNeely conducts
- VSD-5817 Torn Curtain (rejected score) – Bernard Herrmann / Joel McNeely conducts
- VSD-5818 "Surrender" (remix single) – Helen Reddy
- VSD-5819 A Little Night Music – Stephen Sondheim / Terry Trotter performs
- VSD2-5820 Sondheim: A Celebration – Various Artists
- VSD-5821 Batmania: Songs Inspired by Batman – Various Artists
- VSD-5822 The Jane Morgan Collection – Jane Morgan
- VSD-5823 The Caterina Valente Collection – Caterina Valente
- VSD-5824 Golden Age of Lounge – Ian Whitcomb
- VSD-5825 Air Force One – Jerry Goldsmith (Original release does not contain material composed by Joel McNeely)
- VSD2-5826 Cole Porter: A Musical Toast – Various Artists
- VSD-5827 As Time Goes By – Rudy Vallee
- VSD-5828 Friendly Persuasion – Dimitri Tiomkin
- VSD-5829 Buddy – Elmer Bernstein
- VSD-5830 Free Willy 3: The Rescue – Cliff Eidelman
- VSD-5831 Because of You: Fifties Gold – Jeff Harnar
- VSD-5832 1941 – John Williams (Reissue of Bay Cities CD from 1988)
- VSD-5833 Volcano – Alan Silvestri
- VSD-5834 Donnie Brasco – Patrick Doyle (score album)
- VSD-5835 8 Heads in a Duffel Bag – Andrew Gross
- VSD-5836 Bliss – Jan A. P. Kaczmarek
- VSD-5837 Play On! (1997 OCR) – Duke Ellington
- VSD-5838 Leave It to Beaver – Randy Edelman
- VSD-5839 Pledging My Love – Lou Christie
- VSD-5840 The Legendary Singing Cowboy: Chapter One – Gene Autry
- VSD-5841 Gene Autry With the Legendary Singing Groups of the West – Gene Autry
- VSD-5842 Greatest Hits: Volume Two – Roy Clark
- VSD-5843 Whispering Bill: Greatest Hits: Volume Two – Bill Anderson
- VSD-5844 The Country Hits Collection – Ray Stevens
- VSD-5845 The Country Hits Collection – Johnny Tillotson
- VSD-5846 On the Radio: Dick Bartley Presents Collector's Essentials: Volume One – Various Artists
- VSD-5847 On the Radio: Dick Bartley Presents Collector's Essentials: Volume Two – Various Artists
- VSD-5848 Planet of the Apes / Escape from the Planet of the Apes – Jerry Goldsmith
- VSD-5849 Journey to the Center of the Earth – Bernard Herrmann
- VSD-5850 The Ghost and Mrs. Muir – Bernard Herrmann
- VSD-5851 The Mephisto Waltz / The Other – Jerry Goldsmith
- VHV-5852 Jerry Herman's Broadway at the Hollywood Bowl – Various Artists
- VSD-5853 Wedding Bell Blues – Various Artists
- VSD-5854 The Best of Cabaret – Various Artists
- VSD-5855 The Best of the Broadway Divas – Various Artists
- VSD-5856 The Best of Off-Broadway – Various Artists
- VSD-5857 Forever Amber – David Raksin / Alfred Newman conducts
- VSD-5858 Prime Time Musicals – Various Artists
- VSD-5859 Tales from a Parallel Universe – Marty Simon
- VSD-5860 This World, Then the Fireworks – Pete Rugolo
- VSD-5861 Terminator 2: Judgment Day – The Special Edition – Brad Fiedel (Special European release)
- VSD-5862 Kull the Conqueror – Joel Goldsmith
- VSD-5863 Mimic – Marco Beltrami
- VSD-5865 Science Fiction & Fantasy: TV Sound Trek – Various Artists
- VSD-5866 Singin' and Swingin' – the Modernaires
- VSD-5867 The Gay 90s Musical (1997 OCR) – Various Artists
- VSD-5868 Lilies – Mychael Danna
- VSD-5869 Washington Square – Jan A. P. Kaczmarek
- VSD-5870 A Thousand Acres – Richard Hartley
- VSD-5871 Frontiers – Jerry Goldsmith
- VSD-5872 Live at the Village Gate – Flip Wilson
- VSD-5873 The Burt Bacharach Songbook – Burt Bacharach
- VSD-5874 The Very Best of Johnny Bond – Johnny Bond
- VSD-5875 Cinderella: Songs from the Classic Fairy Tale – Various Artists
- VSD-5876 The Night of the Hunter (1998 OCR) – Claibe Richardson & Stephen Cole
- VSD-5877 Starship Troopers – Basil Poledouris
- VSD-5878 Erock for Kids: Songs You Can't Get Out of Your Head – Erock
- VSD-5879 Erock for Kids: Songs You Can't Get Out of Your Head (blister pack) – Erock
- VSD-5880 Ragtime: Themes from the Hit Musical – Brad Ellis
- VSD-5881 Classic TV Game Show Themes – Various Artists
- VSD-5882 It Came from Outer Space: Alien Songbook – Various Artists
- VSD-5883 Xena: Warrior Princess: Volume 2 – Joseph LoDuca
- VSD-5884 Hercules: The Legendary Journeys: Volume 2 – Joseph LoDuca
- VSD-5885 L.A. Confidential – Jerry Goldsmith (score album)
- VSD-5886 The Man Who Knew Too Little – Christopher Young
- VSD-5887 Mad City – Thomas Newman
- VSD-5888 The Paul Simon Album – Various Artists
- VSD-5889 The Burt Bacharach Album – Various Artists
- VSD-5890 Bubblegum Classics: Volume 4: Soulful Pop – Various Artists
- VSD-5891 For Richer or Poorer – Randy Edelman
- VSD-5892 Mouse Hunt – Alan Silvestri
- VSD-5893 Shiloh – Joel Goldsmith
- VSD-5894 Songs from the Silver Screen – Judy Kaye
- VSD-5895 The Winter Guest – Michael Kamen (Solo piano score performed by Kamen)
- VSD-5896 Bubblegum Classics: Volume 5: The Voice of Tony Burrows – Various Artists
- VSD-5897 You Turn Me On: The Best of Ian Whitcomb – Ian Whitcomb
- VSD-5898 Live at Caesars Palace – Tom Jones
- VSD-5899 Live at the Riviera, Las Vegas – Engelbert Humperdinck
- VSD-5900 Viva Zapata! – Alex North / Jerry Goldsmith conducts (re-recording) the Royal Scottish National Orchestra
- VSD-5901 The Agony and the Ecstasy – Alex North / Jerry Goldsmith conducts (re-recording), the Royal Scottish National Orchestra
- VSD-5902 Sedaka's Back – Neil Sedaka
- VSD-5903 The Inspirational Collection – Pat Boone
- VSD-5904 The Inspirational Collection – B. J. Thomas
- VSD-5905 Louie Louie: The Very Best of the Kingsmen – the Kingsmen
- VSD-5906 God, Love and Rock & Roll – Various Artists
- VSD-5907 The Della Reese Collection – Della Reese
- VSD-5908 The Roger Williams Collection – Roger Williams
- VSD-5909 The Singing Cowboy: Chapter Two – Gene Autry
- VSD-5910 Gene Autry and His Little Darlin' Mary Lee – Gene Autry & Mary Lee
- VSD-5911 Somewhere in Time – John Barry / John Debney conducts (Re-recording with the Royal Scottish National Orchestra)
- VSD-5912 There's No Business Like Show Business – Irving Berlin / Alfred Newman
- VSD-5913 Sphere – Elliot Goldenthal
- VSD-5914 U.S. Marshals – Jerry Goldsmith
- VSD-5915 The Replacement Killers – Harry Gregson-Williams
- VSD-5916 The Irish… and How They Got That Way (1998 original cast) – Various Artists
- VSD2-5917 Lerner, Loewe, Lane & Friends: 14th Annual S.T.A.G.E. Benefit – Various Artists
- VSD-5918 Xena: Warrior Princess: Volume 3: The Bitter Suite – Joseph LoDuca
- VSD-5919 The Ferrante & Teicher Collection – Ferrante & Teicher
- VSD-5920 Godzilla: 50 Years of Themes – Randy Miller conducts
- VSD-5921 Moby Dick – Christopher Gordon
- VSD-5922 Kissing a Fool – Joseph Vitarelli / Various Artists
- VSD-5923 Broadway's Biggest '97-'98 – Various Artists
- VSD-5924 Wild Things – George S. Clinton
- VSD-5925 Mercury Rising – John Barry
- VSD-5926 Titanic: The Ultimate Collection – Various Artists / Randy Miller conducts (re-recording)
- VSD-5927 Drop Down and Get Me – Del Shannon
- VSD-5928 The Very Best of Jimmy Wakely – Jimmy Wakely
- VSD-5929 Merlin – Trevor Jones
- VSD-5930 The Best of Al Hibbler – Al Hibbler
- VSD-5931 The Les Brown Songbook – Les Brown
- VSD-5932 Sunshine Days: Pop '60s Classics: Volume 4 – Various Artists
- VSD-5933 Sunshine Days: Pop '60s Classics: Volume 5 – Various Artists
- VSD-5934 Follies: Themes from the Legendary Musical – the Trotter Trio
- VSD-5935 In Like Flint / Our Man Flint – Jerry Goldsmith
- VSD-5936 Paulie – John Debney / Various Artists
- VSD-5937 Music from the Golden Age: Classic 20th Century Fox Films – Various Artists (Later re-released)
- VSD-5938 The Very Best of Gary U.S. Bonds – Gary U.S. Bonds
- VSD-5939 Color, Rhythm & Magic: Classic Disney Instrumentals – Earl Rose
- VSD-5940 Midway – John Williams / Richard Wentworth conducts (re-recording)
- VSD-5941 Amazing Stories – John Williams / Georges Delerue / John Debney conducts (re-recording)
- VSD-5942 Othello (1998 ballet score) – Elliot Goldenthal
- VSD-5943 Titanic: The Classic Film Scores of James Horner – James Horner / John Debney conductor
- VSD-5944 Alone Together – Linda Purl
- VSD-5945 Cabaret: Themes from the Hit Musical – John Kander & Fred Ebb / the Brad Ellis Little Big Band
- VSD-5946 A Perfect Murder – James Newton Howard
- VSD-5947 Beyond the Blue Horizon – Lou Christie
- VHV-5947 Rock 'N' Roll Legends Live – Various Artists
- VSD-5948 The Hungry Years – Neil Sedaka
- VSD-5949 Battlestar Galactica – Stu Phillips (re-recording), the Royal Scottish National Orchestra
- VSD-5950 Back to the Future Trilogy – Alan Silvestri / John Debney conducts
- VSD-5951 Body Heat – John Barry / Joel McNeely conducts (re-recording), London Symphony Orchestra
- VSD-5952 Steppin' Out – Neil Sedaka
- VSD-5953 The Clique – the Clique
- VSD-5954 Kites are Fun: The Best of the Free Design – the Free Design
- VSD-5955 Barry Scott Presents Lost 45s of the '70s & '80s – Various Artists
- VSD-5956 A Broadway Love Story – Christiane Noll
- VSD-5957 Hit TV: Television's Top Themes – Various Artists
- VSD-5958 Duets – Emily Skinner & Alice Ripley
- VSD-5959 Scream / Scream 2 – Marco Beltrami (score album)
- VSD-5961 The 7th Voyage of Sinbad – Bernard Herrmann / John Debney conducts (re-recording)
- VSD-5962 Center Stage – Helen Reddy
- VSD-5963 Small Soldiers – Jerry Goldsmith (score album)
- VSD-5964 Return to Paradise – Mark Mancina
- VSD-5965 Titanic Tunes: A Sing-A-Long in steerage – Ian Whitcomb & the Musical Murrays
- VSD-5966 Songs From the Titanic Era – Ian Whitcomb & the New White Star Orchestra
- VSD-5967 Satin Sheets: The Greatest Hits of Jeanne Pruett – Jeanne Pruett
- VSD-5968 The Very Best of Tommy Overstreet – Tommy Overstreet
- VSD-5969 Monster Mania: The Classic Music from Godzilla Movies – Randy Miller conducts (re-recording)
- VSD-5970 Halloween: 20th Anniversary Edition – John Carpenter
- VSD-5971 The Trouble with Harry – Bernard Herrmann / Joel McNeely conducts (re-recording)
- VSD-5972 One True Thing – Cliff Eidelman
- VSD-5973 On the Radio: Dick Bartley Presents Collector's Essentials: Volume Three – Various Artists
- VSD-5974 On the Radio: Dick Bartley Presents Collector's Essentials: Volume Four – Various Artists
- VSD-5975 Videodrome – Howard Shore
- VSD-5976 Blade – Mark Isham (score album)
- VSD-5977 Ronin – Elia Cmíral
- VSD-5978 Here for You – Petula Clark
- VSD-5979 It Don't Mean a Thing if It Ain't Got That Swing – the Buddy Bregman Band
- VSD-5980 Rounders – Christopher Young
- VSD2-5981 Superman: The Movie – John Williams / John Debney conducts (re-recording)
- VSD2-5982 The English Patient and Other Arthouse Classics – Gabriel Yared / David Hirschfelder / Wojciech Kilar / John Debney conducts, Lydia Cochrane (solo piano) (re-recording with the Royal Scottish National Orchestra)
- VSD-5983 Young Hercules – Joseph LoDuca
- VSD-5984 Softly, as I Leave You – Roger Williams
- VSD-5985 Soldier – Joel McNeely
- VSD-5986 A Portrait of Terror – John Ottman / John Carpenter ("Theme From Halloween") (Rejected score)
- VSD-5987 More Songs from the Burt Bacharach Songbook – Various Artists
- VSD-5988 Pleasantville – Randy Newman (score album)
- VSD-5989 The Siege – Graeme Revell
- VSD-5990 20 Greatest Movie Hits – Gene Autry
- VSD-5991 Love Songs – Gene Autry
- VSD-5992 Dick Bartley Presents Rock & Roll's Greatest Love Songs – Various Artists
- VSD-5993 Here for You (Special Sunset Boulevard Tour Edition) – Petula Clark
- VSD-5994 Lasso from El Paso – Kinky Friedman
- VSD-5995 Live at the Hotel Seville – the Lovin' Spoonful
- VSD-5996 The Magic Circle – the Mamas & the Papas
- VSD-5997 The Very Best of Johnny Tillotson – Johnny Tillotson
- VSD-5998 Superman: The Ultimate Collection – Various Artists / Randy Miller conducts (re-recording)
- VSD-5999 As Thousands Cheer (1999 original cast recording) – Irving Berlin
- VSD-6001 In Dreams – Elliot Goldenthal
- VSD-6002 25 All Time Greatest Hits – Gene Pitney
- VSD-6003 Payback – Chris Boardman / Various Artists
- VSD-6004 Swingin' the Standards – Bobby Darin
- VSD-6005 Regeneration – Mychael Danna
- VSD-6006 The Very Best of the Wooden Nickel Years (1971–1973) – the Siegel–Schwall Band
- VSD-6007 If I Were a Carpenter: 1966-1969: The Very Best of Bobby Darin – Bobby Darin
- VSD-6008 Discoveries Presents Stereo Oldies – Various Artists
- VSD-6009 Discoveries Presents Classic Instrumental Oldies – Various Artists
- VSD-6010 The Grass Harp (1999 OCR) – Claibe Richardson & Kenward Elmslie
- VSD-6011 Little Me (1999 OCR) – Cy Coleman & Carolyn Leigh
- VSD-6012 The Sondheim Collection – Various Artists
- VSD-6013 Jawbreaker – Stephen Endelman (score album)
- VSD-6014 The Corruptor – Carter Burwell (score album)
- VSD-6015 You've Got Mail – George Fenton (score album)
- VSD-6016 Analyze This – Howard Shore / Various Artists (Cancelled)
- VSD-6017 The West Coast East Side Sound: Volume One – Various Artists
- VSD-6018 The West Coast East Side Sound: Volume Two – Various Artists
- VSD-6019 The West Coast East Side Sound: Volume Three – Various Artists
- VSD-6020 The West Coast East Side Sound: Volume Four – Various Artists
- VSD-6021 Alice in Wonderland – Richard Hartley
- VSD-6022 Good Stuff! – Jerry McCain
- VSD-6023 I Believe in Music – Wayne Newton
- VSD-6024 Little by Little (1999 OCR) – Brad Ross, Ellen Greenfield & Hal Hackady
- VSD2-6025 The Song of Bernadette – Alfred Newman
- VSD-6026 The Matrix – Don Davis (score album)
- VSD-6027 Noah's Ark – Paul Grabowsky
- VSD-6028 16 Greatest Hits – Susan Raye
- VSD-6029 25 All Time Greatest Hits – the Shirelles
- VSD-6030 Trojan Songs: The Very Best of Tom Fogerty – Tom Fogerty
- VSD-6031 Xena: Warrior Princess: Volume 4 – Joseph LoDuca
- VSD-6032 Hercules: The Legendary Journeys: Volume 3 – Joseph LoDuca
- VSD-6033 Cinema Romance – Omoté-Sando
- VSD-6034 Here Comes Santa Claus – Gene Autry
- VSD-6035 Happy Together: The Very Best of White Whale Records – Various Artists
- VSD-6036 All Strung Out – Nino Tempo & April Stevens
- VSD-6037 The Best of the Blues Band – the Blues Band
- VSD-6038 The 13th Warrior – Jerry Goldsmith
- VSD-6039 I Paralyze – Cher
- VSD-6040 Bowfinger – David Newman / Various Artists
- VSD-6041 Instinct – Danny Elfman
- VSD-6042 Wild Wild West – Elmer Bernstein / Peter Bernstein (score album)
- VSD-6043 The Minus Man – Marco Beltrami / Various Artists
- VSD-6044 The Kander & Ebb Album – Brent Barrett
- VSD-6045 The Stephen Schwartz Album – Various Artists
- VSD-6046 Out at the Movies – Various Artists
- VSD-6047 Great Composers – John Williams
- VSD-6048 Sun Records Presents 25 All Time Greatest Hits – Various Artists
- VSD-6049 Piano Quintet / String Quartet #2 – Erich Wolfgang Korngold
- VSD-6050 Lo Mucho Que Te Quiero – René y René
- VSD-6051 The Ellington Legacy – Duke Ellington
- VSD-6052 Tender Is the Night / A Hatful of Rain / The Man in the Gray Flannel Suit – Bernard Herrmann
- VSD-6053 Garden of Evil / Prince of Players / King of the Khyber Rifles – Bernard Herrmann
- VSD-6054 The Haunting – Jerry Goldsmith
- VSD-6055 Lake Placid – John Ottman
- VSD-6056 The Complete Original Sun Singles – Johnny Cash
- VSD-6057 The First Time Live, a Long Time Ago at Washington University in St. Louis, Missouri 1962 – the Dillards
- VSD-6058 Matters of the Heart – Patti LuPone
- VSD-6059 You Go-Go Girl – Nancy Sinatra
- VSD-6060 Muppets from Space – Jamshied Sharifi (score album)
- VSD-6061 The Sixth Sense – James Newton Howard
- VSD-6062 The Iron Giant – Michael Kamen (score album)
- VSD-6063 Deep Blue Sea – Trevor Rabin (score album)
- VSD-6064 Teaching Mrs. Tingle – John Frizzell (score album)
- VSD-6065 Frank Guida Presents If You Wanna Be Happy: The Best of the Norfolk Sound – Various Artists
- VSD-6066 Dark Shadows – Bob Cobert
- VSD-6067 Live in Concert – Freda Payne
- VSD-6068 Universal Soldier: The Return – Don Davis (score album)
- VSD-6069 Journey to the Center of the Earth – Bruce Rowland
- VSD-6070 Peyton Place – Franz Waxman / Frederic Talgorn conducts
- VSD-6071 A Christmas Carol – Stephen Warbeck
- VSD-6072 In Too Deep – Christopher Young (score album)
- VSD-6073 Bacharach: The Instrumental Side – Various Artists
- VSD-6074 Unsuspecting Hearts – Emily Skinner & Alice Ripley
- VSD-6075 After the Fair (1999 OCR) – Matthew Ward & Stephen Cole
- VSD-6076 The Story Hour – Sally Mayes
- VSD-6077 Great Composers – Elmer Bernstein
- VSD-6078 Jaws – John Williams / Joel McNeely conducts (re-recording) the Royal Scottish National Orchestra
- VSD-6079 16 Greatest Hits – the Kendalls
- VSD-6080 Kimberly – Basil Poledouris
- VSD-6082 Animal Farm – Richard Hartley
- VSD-6083 If Love Were All (1999 OCR) – Twiggy & Harry Groener / Noël Coward
- VSD-6084 Born Free – John Barry / Frederic Talgorn conducts (re-recording)
- VSD-6085 Surfin' – the Beach Boys
- VSD-6086 The Phantom Menace and Other Movie Hits – Various Artists / Frederic Talgorn conducts (re-recording)
- VSD2-6087 The Twilight Zone – Bernard Herrmann / Joel McNeely conducts (re-recording)
- VSD-6088 House on Haunted Hill – Don Davis
- VSD-6089 Rose of Washington Square – Al Jolson & Alice Faye
- VSD-6090 State Fair (1945 & 1962) – Richard Rodgers & Oscar Hammerstein II / Alfred Newman conducts
- VSD-6091 Anna and the King of Siam – Bernard Herrmann
- VSD-6092 For Love of the Game – Basil Poledouris (score album)
- VSD-6093 The Adventures of Superman: Music from the 1950s TV Series – Various Artists
- VSD-6094 Marnie – Bernard Herrmann / Joel McNeely conducts (re-recording) the Royal Scottish National Orchestra
- VSD-6095 Saturday Night Fever: Themes from the Hit Musical – Grant Geissman
- VSD-6096 Devoted to You: Love Songs – the Everly Brothers
- VSD-6097 25 All-Time Greatest Recordings – the Chordettes
- VSD-6098 The Very Best of Chad & Jeremy – Chad & Jeremy
- VSD-6099 End of Days – John Debney (score album)
- VSD-6101 25 All-Time Greatest Hits – Joe Tex
- VSD-6102 The Best of the '50s Masters (1957–1959) – Billy Ward and his Dominoes
- VSD-6103 Shake It Up, Baby – the Isley Brothers
- VSD-6104 Greatest Hits: Volume One – B. J. Thomas
- VSD-6105 Tighter, Tighter – Tommy James
- VSD-6106 My Dog Skip – William Ross
- VSD-6107 Diamonds – Joel Goldsmith
- VSD-6108 This Is El Chicano – El Chicano
- VSD-6109 Reheated – Canned Heat
- VSD-6110 Dick Bartley Presents: The Greatest All-Girl Groups – Various Artists
- VSD-6111 Palisades Park: The Best of the Swan Recordings – Freddy Cannon
- VSD-6112 Barry Scott Presents: Lost 45s of the '70s & '80s: Volume 2 – Various Artists
- VSD-6113 25 All-Time Greatest Hits – the Champs
- VSD-6114 The Whole Nine Yards – Randy Edelman / Various Artists
- VSD-6115 The 10th Kingdom – Anne Dudley
- VSD-6116 Scream 3 – Marco Beltrami (score album)
- VSD-6117 Warmth of the Sun: Music Inspired by the Beach Boys – Various Artists
- VSD-6118 The Very Best of Claudine Longet – Claudine Longet
- VSD-6119 Lonely Street – Andy Williams
- VSD-6120 Hanging Up – David Hirschfelder / Various Artists
- VSD-6121 Miss Abrams and the Strawberry Point 4th Grade Class – Rita Abrams
- VSD-6122 Swinging With the Duke – Duke Ellington
- VSD-6123 Blues and Ballads – Duke Ellington
- VSD-6124 Movie Memories: A Golden Age Revisited – Various Artists / Richard Kaufman conducts (re-recording)
- VSD-6125 Hamlet – Carter Burwell (score album)
- VSD-6126 Wonder Boys – Christopher Young (Cancelled. A promo was released)
- VSD-6128 Up at the Villa – Pino Donaggio
- VSD-6129 25 All-Time Greatest Sun Records Hits – Jerry Lee Lewis
- VSD-6130 The Complete Sun Singles – Carl Perkins
- VSD-6131 The Very Best of Bobby Sherman – Bobby Sherman
- VSD-6132 25 All-Time Greatest Bubblegum Hits – Various Artists
- VSD-6133 Paleophonic – the Rubinoos
- VSD-6134 The Very Best of Jimmy Wakely – Jimmy Wakely
- VSD-6135 The Very Best of Tex Ritter – Tex Ritter
- VSD-6136 The Very Best of Eddie Dean – Eddie Dean
- VSD-6137 The Very Best of Tex Williams – Tex Williams
- VSD-6138 The Very Best of Noel Boggs – Noel Boggs
- VSD-6139 Christmas Collection – Jimmy Wakely
- VSD-6140 The Big Kahuna – Christopher Young / Various Artists
- VSD-6141 Arabian Nights – Richard Harvey
- VSD-6142 Don Quixote – Richard Hartley
- VSD-6143 I Dreamed of Africa – Maurice Jarre
- VSD-6144 Battlefield Earth – Elia Cmiral
- VSD-6145 Xena: Warrior Princess: Volume 5: Lyre, Lyre, Hearts on Fire – Joseph LoDuca
- VSD-6146 Screen Magic: Songs from Animated Film Classics – Various Artists
- VSD-6147 Rockin' – the Crickets
- VSD-6148 25-All Time Greatest Summer Songs – Various Artists
- VSD-6149 Sons of the Beaches – Flash Cadillac & the Continental Kids
- VSD-6150 Last Kiss: Songs of Teen Tragedy – Various Artists
- VSD-6151 28 Days – Richard Gibbs / Various Artists
- VSD-6152 Running Free – Nicola Piovani
- VSD-6153 On the Beach – Christopher Gordon
- VSD-6154 Shanghai Noon – Randy Edelman
- VSD-6155 First Blood – Jerry Goldsmith (Reissue of Intrada Records release from 1988)
- VSD-6156 The Night Stalker & Other Classic Themes – Bob Cobert
- VSD-6157 Child of Our Times: The Trousdale Demo Sessions 1965–1967 – P. F. Sloan
- VSD-6158 The Sound of Music – Ferrante & Teicher
- VSD-6159 The Best of TV Quiz & Game Show Themes – Various Artists
- VSD-6160 Rebecca – Franz Waxman / Joel McNeely conducts the Royal Scottish National Orchestra
- VSD-6161 The Last of the Mohicans – Trevor Jones / Randy Edelman / Joel McNeely conducts (re-recording) the Royal Scottish National Orchestra
- VSD-6162 The 3 Worlds of Gulliver – Bernard Herrmann / Joel McNeely conducts (re-recording) the Royal Scottish National Orchestra
- VSD-6163 The Ultimate Star Trek – Various Artists / Jerry Goldsmith, Cliff Eidelman & Frederic Talgorn conduct (re-recording) the Royal Scottish National Orchestra
- VSD-6164 20 Number One Hits – Merle Haggard
- VSD-6165 25 All-Time Greatest 4-Star Recordings – Patsy Cline
- VSD-6166 The Gene Autry Show: Volume 1 – Gene Autry
- VSD-6167 The Gene Autry Show: Volume 2 – Gene Autry
- VSD-6168 The Gene Autry Show: Volume 3 – Gene Autry
- VSD-6169 You Know Me – Jackie DeShannon
- VSD-6170 Dragonheart: A New Beginning – Mark McKenzie / Randy Edelman (Theme)
- VSD-6171 Hollow Man – Jerry Goldsmith
- VSD-6172 What Lies Beneath – Alan Silvestri
- VSD-6173 Lover's Prayer – Joel McNeely
- VSD-6174 The Doo-Wop Sound: Street Corner Harmony: Volume 1 – Various Artists
- VSD-6175 The Doo-Wop Sound: Street Corner Harmony: Volume 2 – Various Artists
- VSD-6176 Bali – Wondermints
- VSD-6177 Steal This Movie! – Mader (score album)
- VSD-6178 Live at the Kaleidoscope 1969 – Canned Heat
- VSD-6179 Urban Legends: Final Cut – John Ottman
- VSD-6180 The Replacements – John Debney / Various Artists
- VSD-6181 The Watcher – Marco Beltrami (Includes bonus track)
- VSD-6182 Gone in 60 Seconds – Trevor Rabin (score album)
- VSD-6183 Hercules: The Legendary Journeys: Volume 4 – Joseph LoDuca
- VSD-6184 Nurse Betty – Rolfe Kent / Various Artists
- VSD-6185 On the Radio: Collectors Essentials: Volume 5 – Dick Bartley presents
- VSD-6186 On the Radio: Collectors Essentials: Volume 6 – Dick Bartley presents
- VSD-6187 All the Love – Fran Jeffries
- VSD-6188 Latin Broadway – Various Artists
- VSD-6189 Rita Moreno – Rita Moreno
- VSD-6190 The Gene Autry Show – Gene Autry
- VSD-6191 Lost Souls – Jan A.P. Kaczmarek
- VSD-6192 Ban This! Live from Cavestomp – the Standells
- VSD-6193 Let's Start a Beat – Live from Cavestomp – the Monks
- VSD-6194 Bounce – Mychael Danna (score album)
- VSD-6195 Pay It Forward – Thomas Newman
- VSD-6196 The 6th Day – Trevor Rabin
- VSD-6197 Total Recall: The Deluxe Edition – Jerry Goldsmith (Includes bonus track)
- VSD-6198 Love Decides – Jane Olivor
- VSD-6199 The Home Recordings – Johnny Bond
- VSD-6200 Cruel Intentions (rejected score) and Selected Suites & Themes – John Ottman
- VSD-6201 MechWarrior 4: Vengeance – Duane Decker
- VSD-6202 An Everlasting Piece – Hans Zimmer
- VSD-6203 Legend: The Deluxe Edition – Jerry Goldsmith (Cancelled. Reissued by Silva Screen Records)
- VSD-6204 20 Greatest Songs – Roy Acuff
- VSD-6205 20 Greatest Songs – Don Gibson
- VSD-6206 There Goes the Neighborhood – the Dillard/Haynes Band
- VSD-6207 Vertical Limit – James Newton Howard
- VSD-6208 Proof of Life – Danny Elfman
- VSD-6209 Have a Heart: The Love Songs Collection – B.J. Thomas
- VSD-6210 25-All Time Greatest Hits – Johnny Tillotson
- VSD-6211 All-Time Greatest Hits – Ray Stevens
- VSD-6212 Philadelphia USA – Various Artists
- VSD-6213 Cast Away: The Films of Robert Zemeckis – Alan Silvestri
- VSD-6214 Roads Less Travelled – Johnny Cash & the Tennessee Two
- VSD-6215 Echoes of the Stanley Brothers – Ralph Stanley & the Clinch Mountain Boys
- VSD-6216 This Love is for Real – Brenton Wood
- VSD-6217 The Complete Cadence Recordings (1957–1960) – the Everly Brothers
- VSD-6218 Beatles Classics – Enoch Light
- VSD-6219 Then: Totally Oldies: Volume One – Various Artists
- VSD-6220 One Night – Susan Anton
- VSD-6221 Best Foot Forward (1963 original cast recording) – Hugh Martin & Ralph Blane
- VSD-6222 Live at Symphony Hall, Boston, Massachusetts – Tom Rush
- VSD2-6223 Great Composers – Georges Delerue
- VSD2-6224 Cleopatra – Alex North
- VSD2-6225 In Sessions: A Film Music Celebration – Various Artists (re-recording)
- VSD-6226 The Dish – Edmund Choi / Various Artists
- VSD-6227 Monkeybone – Anne Dudley
- VSD-6228 You Were on My Mind: The Very Best of Sylvia Tyson – Sylvia Tyson
- VSD-6229 Spirit in the Sky – Norman Greenbaum
- VSD-6230 Waiting for a Song – Denny Doherty
- VSD-6231 1958-1962: The Very Best of Wynn Stewart – Wynn Stewart
- VSD-6232 The Sun Sessions – Ike Turner & the Kings of Rhythm
- VSD-6233 The Complete Sun Sessions – Roy Orbison
- VSD-6234 Then: Totally Oldies: Volume Two – Various Artists
- VSD-6235 Best of the Boston Sound – Various Artists
- VSD-6236 The Very Best of Orpheus – Orpheus
- VSD-6237 The Very Best of Ultimate Spinach – Ultimate Spinach
- VSD-6238 Along Came a Spider – Jerry Goldsmith
- VSD-6239 Just Visiting – John Powell
- VSD-6240 Boy Singer – Peter Marshall
- VSD-6241 Aliens: The Deluxe Edition – James Horner
- VSD-6242 The Very Best of Johnny and the Hurricanes – Johnny and the Hurricanes
- VSD-6243 The Tailor of Panama – Shaun Davey
- VSD-6244 O – Jeff Danna (score album)
- VSD-6245 Pavilion of Women – Conrad Pope
- VSD-6246 The Girl Group Sound: 25 All-Time Greatest from Red Bird Records – Various Artists
- VSD-6247 Downhearted Blues: Live at the Cookery – Alberta Hunter
- VSD-6248 20 All-Time Greatest Hits – Johnny Maestro & the Crests
- VSD-6249 The Best of Bobby Day – Bobby Day
- VSD-6250 Never My Love: The Lost Album Sessions – the Addrisi Brothers
- VSD-6251 Wow & Flutter – Kyle Vincent
- VSD-6252 20 Classics – Conway Twitty
- VSD-6253 To You Sweetheart, Aloha – Andy Williams
- VSD-6254 Sun Records: 25 Blues Classics – Various Artists
- VSD2-6255 Xena: Warrior Princess: Volume 6 – Joseph LoDuca
- VSD-6256 Evolution – John Powell
- VSD-6257 Sordid Lives – George S. Clinton / Olivia Newton-John
- VSD-6258 Meisner, Swan & Rich Jr. – Meisner, Swan & Rich Jr.
- VSD-6259 Greatest Hits Live – Vancouver 1986 – Donovan
- VSD-6260 Live Anthology 1965-1968 – the Spencer Davis Group
- VSD-6261 Denizens of the Deep – Ferrante & Teicher
- VSD-6262 A Lot of Things Different – Bill Anderson
- VSD-6263 96 Tears: The Very Best of ? and the Mysterians – ? and the Mysterians
- VSD-6264 Out of This World – Live at the Bitter End – Kenny Vance and the Planotones
- VSD-6265 Remember Pearl Harbor: Songs That Won Pearl Harbor – Various Artists
- VSD-6266 The Mists of Avalon – Lee Holdridge
- VSD-6267 The Score – Howard Shore
- VSD-6268 Sister Mary Explains It All / Lovesick / The Manhattan Project – Philippe Sarde
- VSD-6269 The Rockets – the Rockets
- VSD-6270 25 All-Time Greatest Hits – Del Shannon
- VSD-6271 The Western Collection: 25 Cowboy Classics – Gene Autry
- VSD-6272 Goin' Back to Texas: 25 Texas Classics – Gene Autry
- VSD-6273 Greatest Hits – Dorothy Moore
- VSD-6274 All-Time Greatest Hits – Kris Kristofferson
- VSD-6275 The Ventures Play the Greatest Surf Hits of All Time – the Ventures
- VSD-6276 American Outlaws – Trevor Rabin
- VSD-6277 Jay and Silent Bob Strike Back – James L. Venable (score album)
- VSD-6278 Cats & Dogs – John Debney
- VSD-6279 Rush Hour 2 – Lalo Schifrin (score album)
- VSD-6280 Baby Boy – David Arnold (score album)
- VSD-6281 When Good Ghouls Go Bad – Christopher Gordon
- VSD-6282 The Glass House – Christopher Young
- VSD-6283 Bubble Boy – John Ottman
- VSD-6284 Incurably Romantic – Toni Tennille
- VSD-6285 Songs of the Season – Jane Olivor
- VSD-6286 John Carpenter's Ghosts of Mars – John Carpenter
- VSD-6287 The Mole – David Michael Frank
- VSD-6288 The Omen: The Deluxe Edition – Jerry Goldsmith
- VSD-6289 The Final Conflict: The Deluxe Edition – Jerry Goldsmith
- VSD-6290 Joy Ride – Marco Beltrami
- VSD-6291 Don't Say a Word – Mark Isham
- VSD-6292 Collateral Damage – Graeme Revell
- VSD-6293 I'll Be Home for Christmas – Various Artists
- VSD-6294 Christmas Jump & Jive – Various Artists
- VSD-6295 Alleluia – Benedictine Monks of St. Michael's
- VSD-6296 From Hell – Trevor Jones / Marilyn Manson
- VSD-6297 Life as a House – Mark Isham
- VSD-6298 Thirteen Ghosts – John Frizzell
- VSD-6299 Heart & Soul – Dusty Springfield
- VSD-6300 Love Songs – Patsy Cline
- VSD-6301 Heart & Soul Guitar – Tony Mottola
- VSD-6302 You Belong to My Heart – Engelbert Humperdinck
- VSD-6303 25 All-Time Greatest Hits: 1956-1961 the Cadence Years – Andy Williams
- VSD-6304 25 All-Time Greatest Hits – Frankie Avalon
- VSD-6305 Sign of the Times – Petula Clark
- VSD-6306 The Diamond Collection – Marilyn Monroe
- VSD-6307 Black Knight – Randy Edelman
- VSD-6308 Shrek – Harry Gregson-Williams / John Powell (score album)
- VSD-6309 Damien: Omen II: The Deluxe Edition – Jerry Goldsmith
- VSD-6310 The One – Trevor Rabin
- VSD-6311 Come to My Garden – Minnie Riperton
- VSD-6312 America Forever – Ferrante & Teicher
- VSD-6313 Domestic Disturbance – Mark Mancina
- VSD-6314 The Day the Earth Stood Still – Bernard Herrmann / Joel McNeely conducts (re-recording)
- VSD-6315 The Billy Vaughn Collection – Billy Vaughn
- VSD-6316 Sunset Boulevard – Franz Waxman / Joel McNeely conducts (re-recording)
- VSD-6317 I Am Sam – John Powell (score album)
- VSD-6318 The Affair of the Necklace – David Newman
- VSD-6319 In the Bedroom – Thomas Newman
- VSD-6320 Jimmy Neutron: Boy Genius – John Debney (Cancelled)
- VSD-6321 Mountain Breakdown: The Bluegrass Collection – Various Artists
- VSD-6322 The Best of the McCormick Brothers – the McCormick Brothers
- VSD-6323 The Very Best of Wilma Lee & Stoney Cooper – Wilma Lee Cooper & Stoney Cooper
- VSD-6324 Then: Totally Oldies: Volume Three – Various Artists
- VSD-6326 The Very Best of Arthur Lyman – Arthur Lyman
- VSD-6327 Her Very Best – Gogi Grant
- VSD-6328 Live in Las Vegas – Paul Anka
- VSD-6329 25 All-Time Greatest Novelty Hits – Various Artists
- VSD-6330 Last Orders – Paul Grabowsky
- VSD-6331 Harrison's Flowers – Cliff Eidelman
- VSD-6332 Essential Sun Singles – Johnny Cash & the Tennessee Two
- VSD-6333 25 Hits from the British Invasion – Various Artists
- VSD-6334 American Roots of the British Invasion – Various Artists
- VSD-6335 Original Hit Recordings: The Very Best of the Bachelors – the Bachelors
- VSD-6336 Green Dragon – Mychael & Jeff Danna
- VSD-6337 The Time Machine – Klaus Badelt
- VSD-6338 Dragonfly – John Debney
- VSD-6339 25 All-Time Greatest Doo-Wop Hits – Various Artists
- VSD-6340 At This Moment – Billy Vera & the Beaters
- VSD-6341 Where the Action Is (1964–1981): The Very Best of Freddy Cannon – Freddy Cannon
- VSD-6342 Roger Miller Classics – Roger Miller
- VSD-6343 The Very Best of Jeannie C. Riley – Jeannie C. Riley
- VSD-6344 Live in San Francisco 1966 – Big Brother and the Holding Company
- VSD-6345 Don't Forget to Boogie: Vintage Heat – Canned Heat
- VSD-6346 Panic Room – Howard Shore
- VSD-6347 Greatest Hits – Doug & Rusty Kershaw
- VSD-6348 Gail Davies – Gail Davies
- VSD-6349 Legendary Masked Surfer: The Dean Torrence Anthology – Dean Torrence
- VSD-6350 Andy & David – the Williams Brothers
- VSD-6351 The Salton Sea – Thomas Newman
- VSD-6352 Dinotopia – Trevor Jones (Cancelled. Released on CMP Recordings)
- VSD-6353 Changing Lanes – David Arnold
- VSD-6354 Rollerball – André Previn / Various Artists
- VSD-6355 Jason X – Harry Manfredini
- VSD-6356 Unfaithful – Jan A. P. Kaczmarek
- VSD-6357 Insomnia – David Julyan
- VSD-6358 Ice Age – David Newman
- VSD-6359 Anthology 1953-1961 – Little Milton
- VSD-6361 All-Time Greatest Hits – the Duprees
- VSD-6362 The Very Best of the Olympics – the Olympics
- VSD-6363 A Tribute to the King – Ronnie McDowell
- VSD-6364 Totally Classic Country – Various Artists
- VSD-6365 Blade II – Marco Beltrami (score album)
- VSD-6366 Enough – David Arnold
- VSD-6367 The Bourne Identity – John Powell
- VSD-6368 The Scorpion King – John Debney (score album)
- VSD-6369 Johnny Cash with His Hot and Blue Guitar! – Johnny Cash
- VSD-6370 The Very Best of Merle Travis – Merle Travis
- VSD-6371 The Singing Cowboy – Jimmy Wakely
- VSD-6372 Country Pioneer – Rusty Richards
- VSD-6373 The Singing Cowboys Collection – Various Artists
- VSD-6374 Reign of Fire – Edward Shearmur
- VSD-6375 The Complete Red Bird Recordings – the Dixie Cups
- VSD-6376 Tracey Takes On the Hits – Tracey Ullman
- VSD-6377 Collection – the Irish Rovers
- VSD-6378 25 All-Time Greatest Hits – Maxine Brown
- VSD-6379 Halloween: Resurrection – Danny Lux
- VSD-6380 Eight Legged Freaks – John Ottman
- VSD-6381 Sun Records: 25 Red-Hot Rockabilly Classics – Various Artists
- VSD-6382 The Sun Songbook – Various Artists
- VSD-6383 Sun Records: 25 More Blues Classics – Various Artists
- VSD-6384 The Rockin' Blues: 25 Great Sun Recordings – Jerry Lee Lewis
- VSD-6385 I'm Gonna Shake It: The Sun Recordings – Rosco Gordon
- VSD3-6386 Sun Records: 50th Anniversary Box – Various Artists
- VSD-6387 Simone – Carter Burwell
- VSD-6388 Fear Dot Com – Nicholas Pike
- VSD-6389 All Time Greatest Hits Live – Tommy James and the Shondells
- VSD-6390 Play the Instrumental Hits – the Ventures
- VSD-6391 12 Classics – Bill Anderson
- VSD-6392 12 Classics – Duke Ellington
- VSD-6393 12 Hits – the Everly Brothers
- VSD-6394 12 Hits – the Kendalls
- VSD-6395 12 Hits – Ray Stevens
- VSD-6396 12 Hits – Joe Tex
- VSD-6397 12 Hits of the '60s: Volume One – Various Artists
- VSD-6398 12 Hits of the '60s: Volume Two – Various Artists
- VSD-6399 Great Science Fiction Blockbusters – Various Artists
- VSD-6400 Great Movie Love Themes – Various Artists
- VSD-6401 Christmas Joy – the Ventures
- VSD-6402 City by the Sea – John Murphy / Various Artists
- VSD-6403 An Irish Christmas – the Irish Rovers
- VSD-6404 Winter Wonderland – Various Artists
- VSD-6405 Santa's Greatest Hits – Various Artists
- VSD-6406 Holiday Magic – Beautiful Music for Christmas – Various Artists
- VSD-6407 Then: Totally Oldies: Volume Four – Various Artists
- VSD-6408 The Cowboy is a Patriot – Gene Autry
- VSD-6409 Casino Royale – Burt Bacharach (Reissue of VSD-5265)
- VSD-6410 No Place Like Home on Christmas – Bill Anderson
- VSD-6411 Trapped – John Ottman
- VSD-6412 Star Trek: Nemesis – Jerry Goldsmith
- VSD-6413 Ballistic: Ecks vs. Sever – Don Davis / Various Artists
- VSD-6414 The Tuxedo – John Debney / Christophe Beck
- VSD-6415 Swept Away – Michel Colombier
- VSD-6416 Below – Graeme Revell
- VSD-6417 White Oleander – Thomas Newman
- VSD-6418 The Man from Elysian Fields – Anthony Marinelli
- VSD-6419 Ghost Ship – John Frizzell
- VSD-6420 Ballistic: Ecks vs. Sever – Don Davis (score album)
- VSD-6421 Far from Heaven – Elmer Bernstein
- VSD-6422 The Boys of Belfast: A Collection of Irish Favorites – the Irish Rovers
- VSD-6423 XXX – Randy Edelman (score album)
- VSD-6424 The Emperor's Club – James Newton Howard
- VSD-6425 First Offering – the Peasall Sisters
- VSD-6426 The Quiet American – Craig Armstrong
- VSD-6427 In the Wind: The Folk Music Collection – Various Artists
- VSD-6429 RoboCop – Basil Poledouris (semi-expansion of VCD-47300)
- VSD-6430 Star Trek: Nemesis (SACD) – Jerry Goldsmith
- VSD-6432 Rock & Roll's Classic Love Songs – Various Artists
- VSD-6433 The Recruit – Klaus Badelt
- VSD-6434 Two Weeks Notice – John Powell
- VSD-6435 Nicholas Nickleby – Rachel Portman
- VSD-6436 The Zombies – the Zombies
- VSD-6437 The Very Best of the Easybeats – the Easybeats
- VSD-6438 First Sessions – Warren Zevon
- VSD2-6439 Essential Sons of the Pioneers – Sons of the Pioneers
- VSD-6440 Frank Yankovic & his Yanks – Frankie Yankovic
- VSD-6441 Sings the Songs That Made Him Famous – Johnny Cash
- VSD-6442 The Greatest – Johnny Cash
- VSD-6443 The Ventures Play the Greatest Instrumental Hits of All-Time: Volume 2 – the Ventures
- VSD-6444 Then: Totally Oldies 1980s – Various Artists
- VSD-6445 Play the Country Classics – the Bluegrass All-Stars
- VSD-6446 The Essential Cadence Singles – Everly Brothers
- VSD-6447 The Lost '60s Recordings – Rick Nelson / Jerry Fuller / Glen Campbell / Dave Burgess
- VSD-6448 Daredevil – Graeme Revell (score album)
- VSD-6449 Darkness Falls – Brian Tyler
- VSD-6450 The Hunted – Brian Tyler
- VSD-6451 12 Classics – Ed Bruce
- VSD-6452 12 Country Classics: Volume 1 – Various Artists
- VSD-6453 12 Country Classics: Volume 2 – Various Artists
- VSD-6454 Children of Dune – Brian Tyler
- VSD-6455 Love is a Long Hard Road – the Kendalls
- VSD-6456 Dreamcatcher – James Newton Howard
- VSD-6457 Tears of the Sun – Hans Zimmer featuring Lebo M
- VSD-6458 25 More All-Time Doo-Wop Hits – Various Artists
- VSD-6459 Identity – Alan Silvestri
- VSD4-6460 Varèse Sarabande 25th Anniversary Collection – Various Artists
- VSD-6461 The Hank Williams Songbook – Hank Williams
- VSD-6462 Hal Lifson's 1966 – Various Artists
- VSD-6463 Classics – Bill Anderson
- VSD-6464 Johnny Cash Sings Hank Williams and Other Favorites – Johnny Cash
- VSD-6465 20 Disco Classics: The 30th Anniversary Collection – Various Artists
- VSD-6466 Invitation Only – Mickey Gilley
- VSD-6467 25 Beach Music Classics – Various Artists
- VSD-6468 Now Here's Johnny Cash – Johnny Cash
- VSD-6469 Something Wild – Aaron Copland
- VSD-6470 Get Down Tonight: Greatest Hits Live – KC and the Sunshine Band
- VSD-6471 Hemispheres – Dan Siegel
- VSD-6472 Garden of Earthly Delights: The Best of Mark Winkler – Mark Winkler
- VSD-6473 Sun Records 25 Rare Blues Classics – Various Artists
- VSD-6474 Wrong Turn – Elia Cmiral (score album)
- VSD-6475 Bruce Almighty – John Debney / Various Artists
- VSD-6476 Classic Country: Volume 2: 16 Original Hits – Various Artists
- VSD-6477 Girls! Girls! Girls! 25 All-Time Classics – Various Artists
- VSD3-6478 Sun Records Ultimate Blues Collection – Various Artists
- VSD-6479 The Fabulous Jimmy Dorsey – the Jimmy Dorsey Orchestra
- VSD-6480 Essential Western Swing – Spade Cooley
- VSD-6481 Terminator 3: Rise of the Machines – Marco Beltrami
- VSD-6482 The Italian Job – John Powell
- VSD-6483 The Very Best of Sue Thompson – Sue Thompson
- VSD-6484 25 Rockin' Instrumentals – Various Artists
- VSD-6485 The Best of the Gap Band 1984-1988 – the Gap Band
- VSD-6486 Guilty – Yarbrough and Peoples
- VSD-6487 All Aboard the Blue Train – Johnny Cash
- VSD-6488 The Original Sun Sound of Johnny Cash – Johnny Cash
- VSD-6489 Classics: Volume One – Ernest Tubb
- VSD-6490 Louisiana Man: Best of Live – Doug Kershaw
- VSD-6491 Along the Blues Highway – Chris Thomas King & Blind Mississippi Morris
- VSD-6492 The League of Extraordinary Gentlemen – Trevor Jones (US Varèse Sarabande website exclusive. Released by Colosseum in Europe)
- VSD-6493 Then: Totally Oldies: Volume Six: The Seventies – Various Artists
- VSD-6494 The Very Best of Charley Pride (1987–1989) – Charley Pride
- VSD-6495 The Very Best of the Newbeats – the Newbeats
- VSD-6496 Jeepers Creepers 2 – Bennett Salvay
- VSD-6497 Passionada – Harry Gregson-Williams
- VSD-6498 Freddy vs. Jason – Graeme Revell / Charles Bernstein (Nightmare On Elm Street theme) (score album)
- VSD-6499 Gigli – John Powell
- VSD-6500 The Great Train Robbery: The Deluxe Edition – Jerry Goldsmith
- VSD-6501 S.W.A.T. – Elliot Goldenthal
- VSD-6502 Lara Croft: Tomb Raider – The Cradle of Life – Alan Silvestri (score album)
- VSD-6503 Life is Large – The Kennedys
- VSD-6504 River of Fallen Stars – the Kennedys
- VSD-6505 Complete UK Recordings 1972-1974 – 10cc
- VSD-6506 Complete Singles Plus: 1958-1963 the Sun Years – Charlie Rich
- VSD-6507 More Than You Know – Toni Tennille
- VSD-6508 Lost Cabin Sessions – the Ozark Mountain Daredevils
- VSD-6509 Five-A-Side: The Best of Ace – Ace featuring Paul Carrack
- VSD-6510 Along the Blues Highway – Rockin' Tabby Thomas / Annette Taborn
- VSD-6512 All-Time Greatest Hits – Bobby Vinton
- VSD-6513 The Event – Christophe Beck / Various Artists
- VSD-6514 Out of Time – Graeme Revell
- VSD-6515 Matchstick Men – Hans Zimmer
- VSD-6516 The Rundown – Harry Gregson-Williams (Welcome to the Jungle in Europe)
- VSD-6517 Live at McCabe's – Townes Van Zandt
- VSD-6518 Poltergeist II: The Other Side: The Deluxe Edition – Jerry Goldsmith
- VSD-6519 Lost Treasures: Sentimental Journey – Doris Day / Les Brown
- VSD-6520 Gothika – John Ottman
- VSD-6521 Alias: Season 1 – Michael Giacchino
- VSD-6522 Taken – Laura Karpman
- VSD-6523 Looney Tunes: Back in Action – Jerry Goldsmith
- VSD-6524 Runaway Jury – Christopher Young
- VSD-6525 Elf – John Debney (score album)
- VSD-6526 Sylvia – Gabriel Yared
- VSD-6527 21 Grams – Gustavo Santaolalla / Various Artists
- VSD-6528 Dreamkeeper – Stephen Warbeck
- VSD-6529 Beyond Borders – James Horner
- VSD-6530 The Gospel of John – Jeff Danna
- VSD-6531 Timeline – Brian Tyler
- VSD-6532 House of Sand and Fog – James Horner
- VSD-6533 Scary Movie 3 – James L. Venable / Various Artists
- VSD-6534 Peter Pan – James Newton Howard
- VSD-6535 Paycheck – John Powell
- VSD-6536 Surfin' to Baja – the Ventures
- VSD-6537 Cash Sings Cash – Johnny Cash
- VSD-6538 Romantic Standards: The Great American Love Songs Collection – Various Artists
- VSD-6539 The Statement – Normand Corbeil
- VSD-6540 Heartache – Wanda Jackson
- VSD2-6541 British Invasion Box – Various Artists
- VSD-6542 Chitty Chitty Bang Bang – Richard M. Sherman & Robert B. Sherman
- VSD-6543 Twisted – Mark Isham
- VSD-6544 Traffic: The Miniseries – Jeff Rona
- VSD2-6545 The Blues is Alright – Little Milton with Mighty Sam McClain & Reverend Raven
- VSD-6546 Then: Totally Oldies: Volume 7: The '80s Again – Various Artists
- VSD-6547 The B. T. Puppy Years 1964-1967: The Very Best of the Tokens – the Tokens
- VSD-6548 The Best of Zydeco Party Band – Zydeco Party Band
- VSD-6549 The Best of Bill Haley & His Comets (1951–1954) – Bill Haley & His Comets
- VSD-6550 Dance Album – Carl Perkins
- VSD-6551 The Essential King Masters – Billy Ward and his Dominoes
- VSD-6552 The Big Bounce – George S. Clinton
- VSD-6553 Essential Masters – Jackie Wilson / Billy Ward and his Dominoes
- VSD-6554 Rock & Roll: The First 50 Years: The '50s – Various Artists
- VSD-6555 25 Classic Do-Wap Ballads – Various Artists
- VSD-6556 1963–1965, The Very Best of Fats Domino – Fats Domino
- VSD-6557 Rock & Roll: The First 50 Years: The Early '60s – Various Artists
- VSD-6558 The Inspirational Collection – the Oak Ridge Boys
- VSD-6559 The Magnificent Seven – Elmer Bernstein (reissue)
- VSD-6560 The Thomas Crown Affair – Michel Legrand (reissue)
- VSD-6561 The Complete Plantation Recordings – the Flatlanders
- VSD-6562 Hellboy – Marco Beltrami
- VSD-6563 Godsend – Brian Tyler
- VSD2-6564 The Thorn Birds – Henry Mancini
- VSD-6565 Garage Rock Classics – Various Artists
- VSD-6566 Big Sur – Bobby Darin
- VSD-6567 Best Gospel – Various Artists
- VSD-6568 I Love You – the Zombies
- VSD-6569 Essential First Recordings – Patsy Cline
- VSD-6570 Last Tango in Paris – Gato Barbieri (Reissue of Rykodisc release)
- VSD-6571 The Lion in Winter – Richard Hartley
- VSD-6572 The Day After Tomorrow – Harald Kloser
- VSD-6573 Rancho Deluxe – Jimmy Buffett (Reissue of Rykodisc release)
- VSD-6574 Greatest Hits: Live at the Bottom Line – Lou Christie
- VSD-6575 Wynn Stewart & Joan Howard – Wynn Stewart & Joan Howard
- VSD-6576 Command Performance – Patti Page
- VSD-6577 Bobby Jones: Stroke of Genius – James Horner
- VSD-6578 Battle of Britain – Ron Goodwin / Sir William Walton
- VSD-6579 The Very Best of Peggy Scott & Jo Jo Benson – Peggy Scott & Jo Jo Benson
- VSD-6580 The Chronicles of Riddick – Graeme Revell
- VSD-6581 Starship Troopers 2: Hero of the Federation – John Morgan & William Stromberg
- VSD-6582 The Great Escape – Elmer Bernstein (Reissue of Rykodisc release)
- VSD-6583 Man on Fire – Harry Gregson-Williams
- VSD-6584 The Intimate Mel Tormé: Isn't It Romantic – Mel Tormé
- VSD-6585 The Clearing – Craig Armstrong
- VSD-6586 Salem's Lot – Christopher Gordon / Lisa Gerrard
- VSD-6587 The Missouri Breaks – John Williams (Reissue of Rykodisc release)
- VSD-6588 Monk – Jeff Beal
- VSD-6589 Drift Away and Other Classics – Dobie Gray
- VSD-6590 Good Rockin' Tonight: 25 Essential Rock & Rhythm Classics – Various Artists
- VSD-6591 I, Robot – Marco Beltrami
- VSD-6592 Original Motion Picture Soundtrack – John Powell
- VSD-6593 Complete Columbia Christmas Recordings – Gene Autry
- VSD-6594 Have Yourself a Merry Little Christmas – Rosemary Clooney
- VSD-6595 Some Like It Hot – Adolph Deutsch (Reissue of Rykodisc release)
- VSD-6596 The Misfits – Alex North (Reissue of Rykodisc release)
- VSD-6597 I'm a Boogie Man: The Essential Masters (1948–1953) – John Lee Hooker
- VSD-6598 Dealing With the Devil: 25 Essential Blues Masters – Various Artists
- VSD-6599 Shining Through the Rain – Percy Sledge
- VSD-6600 Timeline: The Unused Score (SACD) – Jerry Goldsmith
- VSD-6601 Tom Sawyer / Huckleberry Finn – Richard M. Sherman & Robert B. Sherman
- VSD-6602 Jerry Lee Lewis – Jerry Lee Lewis
- VSD-6603 The Manchurian Candidate – Rachel Portman with Wyclef Jean / David Amram
- VSD3-6604 The Greatest Story Ever Told – Alfred Newman (Reissue of Ryko three-disc release)
- VSD-6605 Alien vs. Predator – Harald Kloser
- VSD-6606 Paparazzi – Brian Tyler
- VSD-6607 Anacondas: The Hunt for the Blood Orchid – Nerida Tyson-Chew
- VSD-6608 Rear View Mirror: Volume 2 – Townes Van Zandt
- VSD-6609 The Essential Masters – the Stanley Brothers
- VSD-6610 A Private Concert – Townes Van Zandt
- VSD-6611 Space Guitar: The Essential Early Masters – Johnny Watson
- VSD-6612 Sex and the '60s – Various Artists
- VSD-6613 Sun Records: 25 Rock & Roll Classics – Various Artists
- VSD-6614 Rock & Roll: The First 50 Years: The Mid '60s – Various Artists
- VSD-6615 The Final Cut – Brian Tyler
- VSD-6616 Resident Evil: Apocalypse – Jeff Danna (score album)
- VSD-6617 The Cutting Edge: The Deluxe Edition – Patrick Williams / Various Artists (Reissue of Rykodisc release with new content)
- VSD-6618 Carrie – Pino Donaggio (Reissue of Rykodisc release)
- VSD-6619 The Forgotten – James Horner
- VSD-6620 Surviving Christmas – Randy Edelman / Various Artists
- VSD-6621 Being Julia – Mychael Danna / Various Artists
- VSD-6622 Alias: Season 2 – Michael Giacchino
- VSD-6623 The Grudge – Christopher Young
- VSD-6624 A Tribute to Brian Wilson – Brian Wilson
- VSD-6625 Earthsea – Jeff Rona
- VSD-6626 24: The Soundtrack – Sean Callery
- VSD-6627 Carnivàle – Jeff Beal
- VSD-6628 Flight of the Phoenix – Marco Beltrami
- VSD-6629 Shrek 2 – Harry Gregson-Williams (score album)
- VSD-6630 Meet the Fockers – Randy Newman
- VSD-6631 Racing Stripes – Mark Isham
- VSD-6632 Spanglish – Hans Zimmer
- VSD-6633 Elektra – Christophe Beck (score album)
- VSD-6634 Assault on Precinct 13 – Graeme Revell
- VSD-6635 Days of Our Lives: Love Songs – Various Artists
- VSD-6636 Constantine – Brian Tyler / Klaus Badelt
- VSD-6637 Rock & Roll: The First 50 Years: The Late '60s – Various Artists
- VHV-6638 In Dublin: A Little Bit of Irish – Bing Crosby
- VSD-6639 Million Dollar Baby – Clint Eastwood
- VSD-6640 Robots – John Powell (score album)
- VSD-6641 Too Good to Be True – Everly Brothers
- VSD-6642 Complete '60s Duets – George Jones & Gene Pitney with the Jordanaires
- VSD-6643 Dust to Glory – Nathan Furst
- VSD-6644 Sin City – Robert Rodriguez, John Debney & Graeme Revell
- VSD-6645 Kung Fu Hustle – Raymond Wong / Various Artists
- VSD-6646 Country Comes to Carnegie Hall – Roy Clark, Freddy Fender, Hank Thompson & Don Williams
- VSD-6647 Promises, Promises (1968 OCR) – Burt Bacharach & Hal David (Reissue of Rykodisc release)
- VSD-6648 Man of La Mancha – Mitch Leigh & Joe Darion / Laurence Rosenthal conducts (Reissue of Rykodisc release)
- VSD-6649 Scattered, Smothered & Covered – Webb Wilder
- VSD-6650 Champagne Favorites – Lawrence Welk
- VSD-6651 The Interpreter – James Newton Howard
- VSD-6652 House of Wax – John Ottman (score album)
- VSD-6653 Under Western Skies – Sons of the Pioneers
- VSD-6654 Hour of the Gun – Jerry Goldsmith (Reissue of Intrada Records release)
- VSD7-6655 Original Albums: Complete Collection – Johnny Cash
- VSD-6656 Then: Totally Oldies: Volume 8: Classic Rock – Various Artists
- VSD-6657 Greatest Hits – Red Sovine
- VSD-6658 The Adventures of Sharkboy and Lavagirl in 3-D – Robert Rodriguez, John Debney & Graeme Revell
- VSD-6659 Guys and Dolls: Solo Piano – Earl Rose
- VSD-6660 The Way I Feel – Bill Anderson
- VSD-6661 All My Love Belongs to You – Steve Lawrence
- VSD-6662 All Night Long (Live!) – Muddy Waters
- VSD-6663 Stripes – Elmer Bernstein
- VSD-6664 Alive Five-O: Greatest Hits Live – the Ventures
- VSD-6665 The Sisterhood of the Traveling Pants – Cliff Eidelman (score album)
- VSD-6666 Land of the Dead – Reinhold Heil & Johnny Klimek
- VSD-6667 Fantastic Four – John Ottman (score album)
- VSD-6668 Power Pops – Various Artists
- VSD-6669 Essential Gospel Masters – the Stanley Brothers
- VSD-6670 The Skeleton Key – Edward Shearmur / Various Artists
- VSD-6671 Live at the Ice House 1978 – Modern Folk Quartet
- VSD-6672 Crazy Rhythm – Les Paul & His Trio
- VSD-6673 The Great Raid – Trevor Rabin
- VSD-6674 East L.A.: Rockin' the Bario – Various Artists
- VSD-6675 Land of a Thousand Dances – Cannibal & the Headhunters
- VSD-6676 Stealth – BT / Trevor Morris (score album)
- VSD-6677 Back to Back Bacharach – Casino Royale
- VSD-6678 Proof – Stephen Warbeck
- VSD-6679 Four Brothers – David Arnold (score album)
- VSD-6680 It's About Time, It's About Me – Roy Clark
- VSD-6681 Give Me a Future – Everly Brothers
- VSD-6682 Serenity – David Newman
- VSD-6683 An Unfinished Life – Deborah Lurie
- VSD-6684 Greatest Hits – the Wilburn Brothers
- VSD-6685 Country Legend – Johnny Horton
- VSD-6686 Wallace & Gromit: The Curse of the Were-Rabbit – Julian Nott / Rupert Gregson-Williams, etc.
- VSD3-6687 The Omen Trilogy – Jerry Goldsmith
- VSD2-6688 The Fly I & II – Howard Shore / Christopher Young (reissue)
- VSD-6689 A Nightmare On Elm Street – Charles Bernstein (reissue)
- VSD-6690 Nanny McPhee – Patrick Doyle
- VSD-6691 All-Time Greatest Hits Live On Stage – Ferrante & Teicher
- VSD-6692 Lovers Island – Kenny Vance and the Planotones
- VSD-6693 Stay – Thad Spencer & Mark Asche
- VSD-6694 Prime – Ryan Shore / Various Artists
- VSD-6695 Water – Mychael Danna
- VSD-6696 Where the Truth Lies – Mychael Danna
- VSD-6697 The Fog – Graeme Revell
- VSD-6698 A Private Concert – Townes Van Zandt
- VSD-6699 Firefly – Greg Edmonson
- VSD-6700 Stargate: Atlantis – Joel Goldsmith
- VSD-6701 Duma – John Debney / George Acogny
- VSD-6702 Doom – Clint Mansell
- VSD-6703 Music to Watch Girls By: The Best of the Bob Crewe Generation – the Bob Crewe Generation
- VSD-6704 The High and the Mighty: A Century of Flight – Richard Kaufman conducts
- VSD-6705 Zathura – John Debney
- VSD-6706 Doom – Clint Mansell
- VSD-6707 Æon Flux – Graeme Revell
- VSD-6708 Take Another Piece of My Heart – Bettye LaVette
- VSD-6709 Annapolis – Brian Tyler
- VSD-6710 Hostel – Nathan Barr
- VSD-6711 Fun with Dick and Jane – Theodore Shapiro
- VSD-6712 The Family Stone – Michael Giacchino
- VSD-6713 Tristan & Isolde – Anne Dudley
- VSD-6714 The Ten Commandments – Randy Edelman
- VSD-6715 Firewall – Alexandre Desplat
- VSD-6716 Early Recordings 1959 – the Dillards
- VSD-6717 Freedomland – James Newton Howard
- VHV-6718 40 Years of Classic Country – Bill Anderson
- VSD-6719 Echoes of the Louvin Brothers – Charlie Louvin
- VSD-6720 Running Scared – Mark Isham
- VSD-6721 Lost: Season 1 – Michael Giacchino
- VSD-6722 Inside Man – Terence Blanchard
- VSD-6723 The Pink Panther – Christophe Beck
- VSD-6724 Beach Music Sound: Sand in My Shoes – Various Artists
- VSD-6725 Ice Age: The Meltdown – John Powell
- VSD-6726 True Grit: The Classic Westerns of John Wayne – Elmer Bernstein (single disc reissue of both Best of John Wayne Westerns volumes from 47000 series)
- VSD-6727 Retrospective – Tish Hinojosa
- VSD-6728 Because of You: The Love Songs Collection – Bobby Vinton
- VSD-6729 The Sentinel – Christophe Beck
- VSD-6730 Great Train Songs: An American Legend – Roy Acuff
- VSD-6731 Punk Rock! 20 Classics from the World of Mystic Records – Various Artists
- VSD-6732 The Last Stand – John Powell
- VSD-6733 Mission: Impossible III – Michael Giacchino
- VSD-6734 The Best of the Vogues – the Vogues
- VSD-6735 Scary Movie 4 – James L. Venable
- VSD-6736 The Omen (2006) – Marco Beltrami
- VSD-6737 Classic Cowboy Songs – Sons of the Pioneers
- VSD-6738 Year-Round Cowboy Songs for the Whole Year – Gene Autry
- VSD-6739 Stardust: The Bette Davis Story – Earl Rose
- VSD-6740 United 93 – John Powell
- VHV-6741 Johnny Tillotson Sings His All-Time Greatest Hits – Johnny Tillotson
- VSD-6742 Summer Beach Party – Various Artists
- VSD-6743 Stargate: The Deluxe Edition – David Arnold
- VSD-6744 The Philadelphia Years – Hall & Oates
- VSD-6745 Tokyo Drift – Brian Tyler (score album)
- VSD-6746 Monster House – Douglas Pipes
- VSD-6747 1980 Reunion Concert – the Ozark Mountain Daredevils
- VSD-6748 The Ant Bully – John Debney (score album)
- VSD-6749 Winners – Tommy Cash
- VSD-6750 Country Heart – John Conlee
- VSD-6751 Idlewild – John Debney (Cancelled. FYC promo exists)
- VSD-6752 John, the Wolfking of L.A. – John Phillips
- VSD-6753 The Republic Years – Sons of the Pioneers with Roy Rogers
- VSD-6754 Hollywoodland – Marcelo Zarvos (score album)
- VSD-6755 Gridiron Gang – Trevor Rabin
- VSD-6756 All the King's Men – James Horner
- VSD-6757 Complete Phil Spector Sessions – the Paris Sisters
- VSD-6758 Rudolph the Red-Nosed Reindeer and Other Christmas Favorites – Gene Autry
- VSD-6759 Lost: Season 2 – Michael Giacchino
- VSD-6760 The Texas Chainsaw Massacre: The Beginning – Steve Jablonsky
- VSD-6762 36 Unreleased Recordings from the Late '50s & Early '60s – Everly Brothers
- VSD-6763 Flyboys – Trevor Rabin
- VSD-6764 Texas Legend – Don Walser & the Pure Texas Band
- VSD-6765 Retrospective – the Derailers
- VSD-6766 Killer Rock 'n' Roll – Jerry Lee Lewis
- VSD-6767 Bluest Eyes – Storyville
- VHV-6768 A Night at the Ozarks: An Audiograph – the Dillards
- VSD-6769 Children of Men – John Tavener
- VSD-6770 The Malford Milligan Band Rides Again – Malford Milligan
- VSD-6771 The Grudge 2 – Christopher Young
- VSD-6772 24: Seasons 4 & 5 – Sean Callery
- VSD-6775 Wah-Wah – Patrick Doyle
- VSD-6776 Flicka – Aaron Zigman
- VSD3-6777 Franz Waxman: A Centenary Celebration – Joel McNeely & Frédéric Talgorn conduct
- VSD-6778 Night at the Museum – Alan Silvestri
- VSD-6779 We Are Marshall – Christophe Beck (score album)
- VSD-6780 Blood Diamond – James Newton Howard
- VSD-6781 The Good German – Thomas Newman
- VSD-6782 The Good Shepherd – Marcelo Zarvos / Bruce Fowler
- VSD-6783 The Pursuit of Happyness – Andrea Guerra
- VSD-6784 The Holiday – Hans Zimmer
- VSD-6785 Code Name: The Cleaner – George S. Clinton
- VSD-6786 Partition – Brian Tyler
- VSD-6787 Beat the Drum – Klaus Badelt / Ramin Djawadi
- VSD3-6788 Jerry Goldsmith: His Final Recordings (Looney Tunes / Star Trek: Nemesis / Timeline: unused score) – Jerry Goldsmith
- VSD-6789 Ghost Rider – Christopher Young
- VSD-6790 The Astronaut Farmer – Stuart Matthewman
- VSD-6791 Duets – Petula Clark
- VSD-6792 Robotech: The Shadow Chronicles – Scott Glasgow
- VSD-6793 Catch and Release – Brian Transeau / Tommy Stinton (score album)
- VHV-6794 Petula! – Petula Clark
- VSD-6795 Breach – Mychael Danna
- VSD-6796 Nomad: The Warrior – Carlo Siliotto
- VSD-6797 Couldn't Have Come at a Better Time: The Best of the Fenians – the Fenians
- VSD-6798 Snakes on a Plane – Trevor Rabin (score album)
- VSD-6799 Zodiac – David Shire (score album)
- VSD-6800 His Best – Tex Ritter
- VSD-6801 His Best – Johnny Bond
- VSD-6802 The Reaping – John Frizzell
- VHV-6803 1980 Reunion Concert: Rhythm & Joy – the Ozark Mountain Daredevils
- VSD-6804 Tumbling Tumbleweeds – Foy Willing & Riders of the Purple Sage
- VSD-6805 I Fall to Pieces: Ten Timeless Country Songs – Various Artists
- VSD-6806 Pathfinder: The Legend of the Ghost Warrior – Jonathan Elias
- VSD-6807 Grindhouse: Planet Terror – Robert Rodriguez (score album)
- VSD-6808 Premonition – Klaus Badelt
- VSD-6809 The Ultimate Gift – Mark McKenzie
- VSD3-6810 Miklós Rózsa: A Centenary Celebration – Elmer Bernstein, Joel McNeely & Cliff Eidelman conduct
- VSD-6811 Goodbye Bafana – Dario Marianelli (Colosseum Records release, Europe exclusive)
- VSD-6812 Live at the Improv – Shelley Berman
- VSD2-6813 Down to Earth and High Cumberland Jubilee – Jimmy Buffett
- VSD-6814 Roy Acuff Sings Hank Williams – Roy Acuff
- VSD-6815 Collection (reissue) – the Chad Mitchell Trio
- VSD-6816 Then: Ultimate Rock Mix – Various Artists
- VSD-6818 The Lives of Others – Gabriel Yared / Stéphane Moucha
- VSD-6819 Jack of Diamonds – John Phillips
- VSD-6820 The Last Legion – Patrick Doyle
- VSD-6821 The Music of the Wild West – John McEuen
- VSD-6822 Lucky You – Christopher Young (Cancelled. Composer promo exists)
- VSD-6823 The Classic Songs of Ray Price – Ray Price
- VSD-6824 Live Free or Die Hard – Marco Beltrami
- VSD-6825 Evan Almighty – John Debney (score album)
- VSD-6826 Shrek the Third – Harry Gregson-Williams (score album)
- VSD-6827 The Other Conquest – Samuel Zyman / Jorge Reyes
- VSD-6828 1408 – Gabriel Yared
- VSD-6829 Babylon 5: The Lost Tales – Christopher Franke
- VSD-6830 As You Like It – Patrick Doyle
- VSD-6831 Hostel: Part II – Nathan Barr
- VSD-6832 Toussaint – Allen Toussaint
- VSD-6833 I Know Who Killed Me – Joel McNeely
- VSD-6834 Rush Hour 3 – Lalo Schifrin
- VSD-6835 Side by Side – Faron Young & Ray Price
- VSD-6836 Night of Fear: A Collection of Spooky Novelty Songs – Various Artists
- VSD-6837 The Invasion – John Ottman
- VSD-6838 Balls of Fury – Randy Edelman (score album)
- VSD-6839 Prison Break – Ramin Djawadi
- VSD-6840 Shoot 'Em Up – Paul Haslinger
- VSD-6841 The Brave One – Dario Marianelli
- VSD-6842 The Kingdom – Danny Elfman
- VSD-6843 The Essential Masters – Ralph Stanley & the Clinch Mountain Boys
- VSD-6844 Down Home – the Coasters
- VSD-6845 Seven Miles Out of Town – Bob Wills & the Texas Playboys featuring Tommy Duncan
- VSD-6846 The Classic Songs of Spike Jones and His City Slickers – Spike Jones and His City Slickers
- VSD-6847 The Folk Hits Collection – the Highwaymen
- VSD-6848 A Crosby Christmas – Bing Crosby
- VSD-6849 Sea of Dreams – Luis Bacalov
- VSD-6850 Michael Clayton – James Newton Howard
- VSD-6851 The Bronze Age of Radio – the Credibility Gap
- VSD-6852 Rhapsodies for Young Lovers – the Midnight String Quartet
- VSD-6853 In the Valley of Elah – Mark Isham
- VSD-6854 Sleuth – Patrick Doyle
- VSD-6855 Return to House on Haunted Hill – Frederik Wiedmann
- VSD-6856 The Jane Austen Book Club – Aaron Zigman
- VSD-6857 The Best of Jerry Wallace – Jerry Wallace
- VSD-6858 30 Days of Night – Brian Reitzell (Cancelled. Eventually released by Ipac Recordings)
- VSD-6859 Take My Album Please – Henny Youngman
- VSD-6860 Peace in the Valley: Country Gospel Favorites: Volume 1 – Various Artists
- VSD-6861 How Great Thou Art: Country Gospel Favorites: Volume 2 – Various Artists
- VSD-6862 Lions for Lambs – Mark Isham
- VSD-6863 Roy Rogers with the Sons of the Pioneers: The Centennial Collection
- VSD-6864 Mr. Magorium's Wonder Emporium – Alexandre Desplat / Aaron Zigman
- VSD-6865 Aliens vs. Predator: Requiem – Brian Tyler / Jerry Goldsmith, James Horner, Elliot Goldenthal, John Frizzell (themes)
- VSD-6866 Tin Man – Simon Boswell
- VSD-6867 The Tudors: Season 1 – Trevor Morris
- VSD-6868 Bury My Heart at Wounded Knee – George S. Clinton
- VSD-6869 The Great Debaters – James Newton Howard / Peter Golub (score album)
- VSD-6870 Charlie Wilson's War – James Newton Howard
- VSD-6872 Hand-Clapping Gospel Songs – Roy Acuff
- VSD-6873 The Mist – Mark Isham
- VSD-6874 American Gangster – Marc Streitenfeld (score album)
- VSD-6875 Water of Life: A Celtic Collection – the Highwaymen
- VSD-6876 When Irish Eyes Are Smiling – Bing Crosby
- VSD-6877 The Bucket List / Solo Piano Themes by Marc Shaiman – Marc Shaiman
- VSD-6878 I Am Legend – James Newton Howard
- VSD-6879 The Ventures Play Their Greatest Hits – the Ventures
- VSD-6880 Greatest: The Singles Collection – Argent
- VSD-6881 27 Dresses – Randy Edelman
- VSD-6882 Miss Pettigrew Lives for a Day – Paul Englishby
- VSD-6883 Vantage Point – Atli Örvarsson
- VSD-6884 The Other Boleyn Girl – Paul Cantelon
- VSD-6885 Fool's Gold – George Fenton
- VSD-6886 Stop-Loss – John Powell
- VSD-6887 Leatherheads – Randy Newman
- VSD-6888 Dr. Seuss' Horton Hears A Who! – John Powell
- VSD-6889 Nim's Island – Patrick Doyle
- VSD-6890 The Visitor – Jan A. P. Kaczmarek
- VSD-6891 P.S. I Love You – John Powell (score album)
- VSD2-6892 Lost: Season 3 – Michael Giacchino
- VSD-6893 John Adams – Rob Lane / Joseph Vitarelli
- VSD-6894 Cowboy Hymns and Songs of Inspiration – Gene Autry
- VSD-6895 From Genesis to Revelation – Genesis
- VSD-6896 The Best of Julius La Rosa – Julius La Rosa
- VSD-6897 Standard Operating Procedure – Danny Elfman
- VSD-6898 Speed Racer – Michael Giacchino
- VSD-6899 Western Hymns and Spirituals – the Sons of the Pioneers
- VSD4-6900 A 30th-Anniversary Celebration – Various Artists
- VSD-6901 The Happening – James Newton Howard
- VSD-6902 Mongol – Tuomas Kantelinen
- VSD-6903 Pussycat – John Phillips
- VSD-6904 Get Smart – Trevor Rabin
- VSD-6905 Songs from His Famous Radio Broadcasts – Bing Crosby
- VSD-6906 Meet Dave – John Debney
- VSD-6907 20 Classic Songs of Tommy Overstreet – Tommy Overstreet
- VSD-6908 Hancock – John Powell
- VSD-6909 Timeless: The Classic Concert Performances – Roy Clark
- VSD-6910 Hellboy II: The Golden Army – Danny Elfman
- VSD-6915 She's About a Mover: Complete Singles 1964-1967 – Sir Douglas Quintet
- VSD-6916 The Mummy: Tomb of the Dragon Emperor – Randy Edelman
- VSD-6917 Just You Wait – Walter Scott
- VSD-6918 The Sisterhood of the Traveling Pants 2 – Rachel Portman (score album)
- VSD-6919 The Girl from U.N.C.L.E. – Dave Grusin / Jerry Goldsmith
- VSD-6920 Greatest Hits 1973-1985 – Gladys Knight & the Pips
- VSD-6921 Traitor – Mark Kilian
- VSD-6922 Fly Me to the Moon – Ramin Djawadi
- VSD-6923 Body of Lies – Marc Streitenfeld
- VSD-6924 Nights in Rodanthe – Jeanine Tesori (score album)
- VSD-6925 Babylon A.D. – Atli Örvarsson
- VSD-6926 Igor – Patrick Doyle
- VSD-6927 Eagle Eye – Brian Tyler
- VSD-6928 Plant and See – Plant and See
- VSD-6929 Che – Alberto Iglesias
- VSD-6930 Passengers – Edward Shearmur
- VSD-6931 Pride and Glory – Mark Isham
- VSD-6932 Pushing Daisies – James Dooley
- VSD-6933 Flash of Genius – Aaron Zigman
- VSD-6934 Changeling – Clint Eastwood
- VSD-6935 Righteous Kill – Edward Shearmur (Cancelled)
- VSD-6936 24: Redemption – Sean Callery
- VSD-6937 Valkyrie – John Ottman
- VSD-6938 The Day the Earth Stood Still – Tyler Bates
- VSD-6939 Live at the Blues Warehouse – Foghat
- VSD-6940 Keith Emerson Band – Keith Emerson Band featuring Marc Bonilla
- VSD-6941 Seven Pounds – Angelo Milli
- VSD-6942 Frost/Nixon – Hans Zimmer
- VSD-6943 Largo Winch – Alexandre Desplat (Colosseum Records release, Europe only)
- VSD-6944 Family Joules – Foghat
- VSD-6946 The International – Tom Tykwer / Reinhold Heil / Johnny Klimek
- VSD-6947 Taking Chance – Marcelo Zarvos
- VSD-6948 The Lazarus Project – Brian Tyler
- VSD-6949 Their Very Best – the Amazing Rhythm Aces
- VSD-6950 Myrtle Beach Days: The Classic Sound of Beach Music – Various Artists
- VSD-6951 The Gene Generation – Scott Glasgow
- VSD-6952 Phoebe in Wonderland – Christophe Beck
- VSD-6954 Dragonball Evolution – Brian Tyler
- VSD-6955 Duplicity – James Newton Howard
- VSD-6956 Knowing – Marco Beltrami
- VSD-6957 Vande Mataram – A. R. Rahman
- VSD-6958 Crossing Over – Mark Isham
- VSD-6959 The Tudors: Season 2 – Trevor Morris
- VSD-6960 Fast & Furious – Brian Tyler (score album)
- VSD-6961 Chéri – Alexandre Desplat
- VSD-6962 Our Little Planet – Tish Hinojosa
- VSD-6963 Grey Gardens – Rachel Portman
- VSD-6964 Lost: Season 4 – Michael Giacchino
- VSD-6965 Andy Warhol Presents Man on the Moon – John Phillips
- VSD-6966 Star Trek – Michael Giacchino
- VSD-6967 X-Men Origins: Wolverine – Harry Gregson-Williams
- VSD-6968 Coco avant Chanel (Coco Before Chanel US title) – Alexandre Desplat
- VSD-6969 Night at the Museum: Battle of the Smithsonian – Alan Silvestri
- VSD-6970 The Very Best of David Frizzell & Shelley West – David Frizzell & Shelley West
- VSD-6973 Prison Break: Seasons 3 & 4 – Ramin Djawadi
- VSD-6975 Land of the Lost – Michael Giacchino
- VSD-6977 My Sister's Keeper – Aaron Zigman (score album)
- VSD-6978 Ice Age: Dawn of the Dinosaurs – John Powell
- VSD-6980 G.I. Joe: The Rise of Cobra – Alan Silvestri
- VSD-6981 Orphan – John Ottman
- VSD-6982 Aliens in the Attic – John Debney
- VSD-6983 The Final Destination – Brian Tyler
- VSD-6984 True Blood – Nathan Barr
- VSD-6985 The Hills Run Red – Frederik Wiedmann
- VSD-6986 Whiteout – John Frizzell
- VSD-6989 Astro Boy – John Ottman
- VSD-6990 The Vampire's Assistant – Stephen Trask
- VSD-6991 Children of the Corn (2009) – Jonathan Elias / Nathaniel Morgan
- VSD-6992 44 Inch Chest – Angelo Badalamenti / 100 Suns
- VSD-6993 Cracks – Javier Navarrete (Colosseum Records release, Europe only)
- VSD-6994 Amelia – Gabriel Yared
- VSD-6995 The Fourth Kind – Atli Örvarsson
- VSD-6996 The Prisoner – Rupert Gregson-Williams
- VSD-6997 Alice – Ben Mink
- VSD-6998 The Last Station – Sergey Yevtushenko
- VSD-6999 Everybody's Fine – Dario Marianelli
- VSD-7000 Revolution – John Corigliano
- VSD-7001 It's Complicated – Hans Zimmer & Heitor Pereira (Cancelled. Released digitally through Back Lot Music)
- VSD-7002 Leap Year – Randy Edelman
- VSD-7003 Tooth Fairy – George S. Clinton
- VSD-7004 The Blackwood Brothers – the Blackwood Brothers
- VSD-7005 Hovie Lister and the Statesmen – Hovie Lister and the Statesmen
- VSD-7007 The Ghost Writer – Alexandre Desplat
- VSD-7008 South of the Border: Songs of Old Mexico – Gene Autry
- VSD-7009 The Crazies – Mark Isham
- VSD-7010 The Wolfman – Danny Elfman
- VSD-7011 Green Zone – John Powell
- VSD-7012 How to Train Your Dragon – John Powell
- VSD-7013 Fringe – Michael Giacchino, Chris Tilton & Chad Seitzer
- VSD-7014 Brooklyn's Finest – Marcelo Zarvos
- VSD-7015 Nanny McPhee Returns – James Newton Howard
- VSD-7016 Many Mamas, Many Papas – John Phillips
- VSD-7017 Still Rovin' After All These Years – the Irish Rovers
- VSD-7018 Tripping the Velvet – Annie Minogue Band (digital only)
- VSD-7020 Robin Hood – Marc Streitenfeld
- VSD-7021 Mother and Child – Edward Shearmur
- VSD-7022 Sing the Stephen Foster Songbook – Sons of the Pioneers
- VSD-7023 The Essential Sun Records Country Hits – Jerry Lee Lewis
- VSD-7024 Shrek Forever After – Harry Gregson-Williams (score album)
- VSD-7025 Lost: Season 5 – Michael Giacchino
- VSD-7026 Palindrome – Billy Cobham
- VSD-7027 Songs of Inspiration – Brenda Lee
- VSD-7028 Songs of Inspiration – Wilma Lee & Stoney Cooper
- VSD-7029 Songs of Inspiration – the Jordanaires
- VSD-7030 In Jesus' Eyes – Ed Bruce
- VSD-7032 The A-Team – Alan Silvestri
- VSD-7033 Marmaduke – Christopher Lennertz
- VSD-7034 Knight and Day – John Powell
- VSD-7035 The Special Relationship – Alexandre Desplat (Cancelled. Released as part of the Limited Edition series)
- VSD-7036 The Last Word in Jesus is Us – Roy Clark
- VSD-7037 Charlie St. Cloud – Rolfe Kent
- VSD-7039 The Tudors: Season 3 – Trevor Morris
- VSD-7040 Lost: The Final Season – Michael Giacchino
- VSD-7041 Cats & Dogs: The Revenge of Kitty Galore – Christopher Lennertz (score album)
- VSD-7042 Live! From Texas – the Derailers
- VSD-7043 Never Let Me Go – Rachel Portman
- VSD-7044 True Blood: Season 2 – Nathan Barr
- VSD-7045 Spartacus: Blood and Sand – Joseph LoDuca
- VSD-7046 Labour of Love IV – UB40
- VSD-7047 The Pillars of the Earth – Trevor Morris
- VSD-7048 Hachi: A Dog's Tale – Jan A. P. Kaczmarek
- VSD-7049 The Tudors: Season 4 – Trevor Morris
- VSD-7050 Moscow – the Keith Emerson Band featuring Marc Bonilla
- VSD-7051 Get Low – Jan A. P. Kaczmarek (score album)
- VSD-7052 Music for Film and Television – Angelo Badalamenti
- VSD-7053 Let Me In – Michael Giacchino
- VSD-7057 Skyline – Matthew Margeson
- VSD-7058 Little Fockers – Stephen Trask
- VSD-7059 20th Century Fox: 75 Years of Great Film Music – Various Artists
- VSD-7060 Pushing Daisies: Season 2 – James Dooley
- VSD-7062 The Way Back – Burkhard Dallwitz
- VSD-7063 Sanctum – David Hirschfelder
- VSD-7064 Unknown – John Ottman & Alexander Rudd
- VSD-7065 Songs of Inspiration – Ray Price
- VSD-7066 The Pacific Flow to Abbey Road – Randy Edelman
- VSD-7067 Fringe: Season 2 – Chris Tilton
- VSD-7068 Los Angeles – Brian Tyler
- VSD-7069 Ironclad – Lorne Balfe (Colosseum Records release, Europe only)
- VSD-7070 La Ligne droite – Patrick Doyle (Colosseum Records release, Europe only)
- VSD-7071 Your Highness – Steve Jablonsky
- VSD-7072 Largo Winch II – Alexandre Desplat (Colosseum Records release, Europe only)
- VSD-7073 Moscow – Keith Emerson Band featuring Marc Bonilla
- VSD-7074 Songs of Inspiration – the Wilburn Brothers
- VSD-7075 The Tourist – James Newton Howard
- VSD-7076 Gulliver's Travels – Henry Jackman
- VSD-7077 Songs of Inspiration – Buck Owens & the Buckaroos
- VSD-7078 The Very Best of Buck Owens & Susan Raye – Buck Owens & Susan Raye
- VSD-7079 The Princess of Montpensier – Philippe Sarde
- VSD-7080 Les Yeux de sa mère – Gustavo Santaolalla (Colosseum Records release, Europe only)
- VSD-7081 The Very Best of Wanda Jackson – Wanda Jackson
- VSD-7082 Hop – Christopher Lennertz (score album)
- VSD-7083 Scream 4 – Marco Beltrami (score album)
- VSD-7084 Rio – John Powell (score album)
- VSD-7085 La Fille du puisatier – Alexandre Desplat (Colosseum Records release, Europe only)
- VSD-7086 Mildred Pierce – Carter Burwell
- VSD-7087 The Very Best of Dan Seals – Dan Seals
- VSD-7088 Fast Five – Brian Tyler (score album)
- VSD-7089 Camelot – Mychael Danna & Jeff Danna
- VSD-7090 I Am Number Four – Trevor Rabin
- VSD-7091 The Borgias – Trevor Morris
- VSD-7092 Kung Fu Panda 2 – Hans Zimmer & John Powell
- VSD-7093 The Best of Angel Voices – the St. Philip's Boys Choir
- VSD-7094 The Man They Call Mr. Piano Plays Romantic Melodies of Our Time – Roger Williams
- VSD-7095 The Family Way – Paul McCartney
- VSD-7096 The Very Best of Earl Klugh: The Blue Note Years – Earl Klugh
- VSD-7097 Game of Thrones – Ramin Djawadi
- VSD-7098 Another Year – Gary Yershon
- VSD-7099 The First Grader – Alex Heffes
- VSD-7100 Monte Carlo – Michael Giacchino
- VSD-7101 Super 8 – Michael Giacchino
- VSD-7102 Too Big to Fail – Marcelo Zarvos
- VSD-7103 Mr. Popper's Penguins – Rolfe Kent
- VSD-7104 Jig – Patrick Doyle
- VSD-7105 Cowboys & Aliens – Harry Gregson-Williams
- VSD-7106 Rise of the Planet of the Apes – Patrick Doyle
- VSD-7107 The Classic Songs of Dickey Lee – Dickey Lee
- VSD-7108 The Wilburn Brothers Show – the Wilburn Brothers
- VSD-7109 Final Destination 5 – Brian Tyler
- VSD-7110 John Carpenter's The Ward – Mark Kilian
- VSD-7111 Fright Night – Ramin Djawadi
- VSD-7112 Soundtrack – Dwight Twilley
- VSD-7113 Are You Ready?: Sweet Live – the Sweet
- VSD-7114 The Help – Thomas Newman (score album)
- VSD-7115 Dream House – John Debney
- VSD-7116 The Thing – Marco Beltrami
- VSD-7117 Johnny English Reborn – Ilan Eshkeri
- VSD-7118 The Centennial Collection – Roy Rogers with the Sons of the Pioneers
- VSD-7119 Lost Weekend: The Best of Wall of Voodoo (The I.R.S Years) – Wall of Voodoo
- VSD-7120 Dolphin Tale – Mark Isham
- VSD-7121 Tower Heist – Christophe Beck
- VSD-7122 Real Steel – Danny Elfman (score album)
- VSD-7123 The Ides of March – Alexandre Desplat
- VSD-7124 Will – Nigel Clarke and Michael Csányi-Wills (Colosseum Records release, Europe only)
- VSD-7125 A Very Harold & Kumar 3D Christmas – William Ross (score album)
- VSD-7126 Albert Nobbs – Brian Byrne
- VSD-7127 Power Play – Billy Cobham
- VSD-7128 Mission: Impossible – Ghost Protocol – Michael Giacchino
- VSD-7129 Reflections of Life – Dale Evans
- VSD-7130 Golden Inspirational Hymns – Roger Williams
- VSD-7131 Big Miracle – Cliff Eidelman
- VSD-7132 Fringe: Season 3 – Chris Tilton
- VSD-7133 In the Land of Blood and Honey – Gabriel Yared / Various Artists
- VSD-7134 Black Gold – James Horner (Day of the Falcon US title)
- VSD-7135 There Be Dragons: Secretos de Pasión – Robert Folk
- VSD-7136 Gracious Days – the Demolition String Band featuring Elena Skye and Boo Reiners
- VSD-7137 Safe House – Ramin Djawadi
- VSD-7138 Dr. Seuss' The Lorax – John Powell (score album)
- VSD-7139 Spartacus: Vengeance – Joseph LoDuca
- VSD-7140 Jacaranda – Trevor Rabin
- VSD-7141 Coriolanus – Ilan Eshkeri
- VSD-7142 Bel Ami – Lakshman Joseph de Saram & Rachel Portman
- VSD-7143 Brake – Brian Tyler
- VSD-7144 Green Blimp – Dwight Twilley
- VSD-7145 The Cabin in the Woods – David Julyan
- VSD-7146 Battleship – Steve Jablonsky
- VSD-7147 Picture This – Billy Cobham (GRP Records reissue)
- VSD-7148 Game of Thrones: Season 2 – Ramin Djawadi
- VSD-7149 Touchback – William Ross
- VSD-7150 Warning – Billy Cobham (GRP Records reissue)
- VSD-7151 Hemingway & Gellhorn – Javier Navarrete
- VSD-7152 Ice Age: Continental Drift – John Powell
- VSD-7153 The Chorus (Les Choristes) – Bruno Coulais (reissue)
- VSD-7154 Savages – Adam Peters / Various Artists
- VSD-7155 It's Your Night – James Ingram
- VSD-7156 The Adventurers – Quincy Jones and the Ray Brown Orchestra (LP reissue)
- VSD-7157 Basie and Beyond – the Quincy Jones – Sammy Nestico Orchestra
- VSD-7158 The Bourne Legacy – James Newton Howard
- VSD-7159 Samsara – Michael Stearns, Lisa Gerrard & Marcello De Francisci
- VSD-7160 Baraka: The Deluxe Edition – Michael Stearns
- VSD-7161 High Ground – Chris Bacon (Cancelled. Digital release only)
- VSD-7162 The Apparition – Tomandandy
- VSD-7163 For Greater Glory: The True Story of Cristiada – James Horner
- VSD-7164 Person of Interest – Ramin Djawadi
- VSD-7165 Three Fates Project – the Keith Emerson Band
- VSD-7166 The Very Best of Adrian Legg – Adrian Legg
- VSD-7167 Winged Migration – Bruno Coulais (reissue)
- VSD-7168 Bad Karma – Bryce Jacobs (Colosseum Records release, Europe only)
- VSD-7169 Trouble with the Curve – Marco Beltrami
- VSD-7170 Parade's End – Dirk Brossé (Colosseum Records release, Europe only)
- VSD-7171 Christmas Songs – Roberta Flack
- VSD-7172 Fringe: Season 4 – Chris Tilton
- VSD-7173 Sinister – Christopher Young
- VSD-7174 Shadow Dancer – Dickon Hinchliffe (Colosseum Records release, Europe only)
- VSD-7175 Rise of the Guardians – Alexandre Desplat
- VSD-7177 Microcosmos – Bruno Coulais (reissue)
- VSD-7178 Gangster Squad – Steve Jablonsky (score album)
- VSD-7179 Parker – David Buckley
- VSD-7180 Bullet to the Head – Steve Mazzaro
- VSD-7181 Transmigration Macabre – Ravi Shankar
- VSD-7182 Side Effects – Thomas Newman
- VSD-7183 There Are But Four Small Faces – Small Faces
- VSD-7184 Spartacus: War of the Damned – Joseph LoDuca
- VSD-7185 Varèse Sarabande: A 35th Anniversary Celebration
- VSD-7186 Show Boat: A London Studio Cast Recording – music By Jerome Kern, lyrics By Oscar Hammerstein II
- VSD-7188 The Idolmaker – Jeff Barry
- VSD-7189 Himalaya – Bruno Coulais
- VSD-7190 G.I. Joe: Retaliation – Henry Jackman
- VSD-7191 House of Cards – Jeff Beal
- VSD-7192 Dead Man Down – Jacob Groth
- VSD-7193 Pain & Gain – Steve Jablonsky
- VSD-7194 Impressions of America – Patrick Doyle
- VSD-7195 Flash Harry – Harry Nilsson
- VSD-7196 Fringe: Season 5 – Chris Tilton
- VSD-7197 Stuck in Love – Mike Mogis & Nate Walcott / Various Artists
- VSD-7198 Star Trek Into Darkness – Michael Giacchino
- VSD-7200 1985 at the Movies – David Newman and the Varèse Symphony Orchestra
- VSD-7203 Copperhead – Laurent Eyquem
- VSD-7204 The Boys Club: Live From California: The Complete Concert – Keith Emerson, Glenn Hughes & Marc Bonilla
- VSD-7205 The Hangover Trilogy (Features music from The Hangover, The Hangover Part II and The Hangover Part III) – Christophe Beck
- VSD-7206 Mull of Kintyre – the Campbeltown Pipe Band
- VSD-7207 Beatles to Bond and Bach – George Martin & His Orchestra
- VSD-7208 No Place on Earth – John Piscitello (Cancelled. Digital release only)
- VSD-7209 One Track Heart – J Mascis & Devadas
- VSD-7210 White House Down – Thomas Wander & Harald Kloser
- VSD-7211 The Smurfs 2 – Heitor Pereira (score album)
- VSD-7212 Elysium – Ryan Amon
- VSD-7213 Evidence – Atli Örvarsson (Amazon on demand title. Digital & CDR release)
- VSD-7214 Imogene – Rob Simonsen (US direct to digital title Girl Most Likely) (Amazon on demand title, digital & CDR release)
- VSD-7215 After the Fair – Tish Hinojosa
- VSD-7216 Adore – Christopher Gordon / Antony Partos
- VSD-7217 Hemlock Grove – Nathan Barr
- VSD-7219 The Ultimate Life – Mark McKenzie
- VSD-7220 Standing Up – Brian Tyler
- VSD-7221 Getaway – Justin Burnett (limited)
- VSD-7222 A Boy Named Charlie Brown – Rod McKuen
- VSD-7226 Captain Phillips – Henry Jackman
- VSD-7227 Ender's Game – Steve Jablonsky
- VSD-7229 Person of Interest: Season 2 – Ramin Djawadi
- VSD-7233 Arrested Development – David Schwartz / Various Artists
- VSD-7234 Last Vegas – Mark Mothersbaugh / Various Artists
- VSD-7236 Any Which Way You Can – Various Artists (Reissue of Warner Bros. Records LP)
- VSD-7237 Honkytonk Man – Various Artists (Reissue of Warner Bros. Records LP)
- VSD-7238 Sharky's Machine – Various Artists (Reissue of Warner Bros. Records LP)
- VSD-7239 Strike Back – Scott Shields
- VSD-7240 Oldboy – Roque Baños
- VSD-7241 Hours – Benjamin Wallfisch
- VSD-7242 Jack Ryan: Shadow Recruit – Patrick Doyle
- VSD-7245 Ride Along – Christopher Lennertz
- VSD-7246 47 Ronin – Ilan Eshkeri
- VSD-7247 Drive Hard – Bryce Jacobs (Amazon on demand CDR & digital download release)
- VSD-7248 Lock Up – Bill Conti (Limited reissue of Intrada Special Collection title)
- VSD-7250 That Awkward Moment – David Torn / Various Artists
- VSD-7251 Non-Stop – John Ottman / Edwin Wendler
- VSD-7252 The Railway Man – David Hirschfelder
- VSD-7253 Songs Our Daddy Taught Us – the Everly Brothers
- VSD-7255 Enough Said – Marcelo Zarvos
- VSD-7256 After the Dark (The Philosophers) – Nicholas O'Toole and Jonathan Davis
- VSD-7257 The Right Kind of Wrong – Rachel Portman
- VSD-7258 Porky's Revenge! – Various Artists (Reissue of Mobile Fidelity & Sony Legacy CDs)
- VSD-7259 Shameless – Various Artists
- VSD-7262 One on One – Charles Fox / Seals and Crofts (LP reissue)
- VSD-7263 Oculus – the Newton Brothers
- VSD-7266 R.I.P. – the Zombies
- VSD-7267 Bates Motel – Chris Bacon
- VSD-7268 Who Is Killing the Great Chefs of Europe? – Henry Mancini (Limited reissue of MCA Records LP)
- VSD-7270 The Quiet Ones – Lucas Vidal
- VSD-7271 House of Cards: Season 2 – Jeff Beal
- VSD-7272 Need for Speed – Nathan Furst (score album)
- VSD-7273 The Long Night – Michael Bradford
- VSD-7274 Dan Curtis' Dracula – Bob Cobert
- VSD-7278 Belle – Rachel Portman
- VSD-7279 Calvary – Patrick Cassidy
- VSD-7280 Hidden Moon – Luis Bacalov / Various Artists
- VSD-7284 The Signal – Nima Fakhrara
- VSD-7286 Whiplash – Justin Hurwitz, Tim Simonec / Various Artists
- VSD-7287 Ninjago: Masters of Spinjitzu – Jay Vincent & Michael Kramer
- VSD-7292 Into the Storm – Brian Tyler
- VSD-7294 The Equalizer – Harry Gregson-Williams
- VSD-7295 The November Man – Marco Beltrami
- VSD-7296 Snowpiercer – Marco Beltrami
- VSD-7297 A Walk Among the Tombstones – Carlos Rafael Rivera
- VSD-7298 Penny Dreadful: Season 1 – Abel Korzeniowski
- VSD-7299 Chuck – Tim Jones
- VSD-7303 The Loft – John Frizzell
- VSD-7305 Addicted – Aaron Zigman
- VSD-7306 The Hero of Color City – Zoe Poledouris-Roche / Angel Roche
- VSD-7307 Revenge of the Green Dragons – Mark Kilian
- VSD-7308 Fury – Steven Price
- VSD-7309 John Wick – Tyler Bates / Joel J. Richard / Various Artists
- VSD-7312 Elmer Bernstein: The Wild Side – Elmer Bernstein / Big Band de Canarias
- VSD-7314 Orange Is the New Black – Gwendolyn Sanford, Brandon Jay & Scott Doherty
- VSD-7315 Keep On Keepin' On – Justin Kauflin / Quincy Jones / Various Artists
- VSD-7317 The Homesman – Marco Beltrami
- VSD-7318 Mr. Turner – Gary Yershon
- VSD-7319 Woman in Black 2: Angel of Death – Marco Beltrami, Marcus Trumpp & Brandon Roberts
- VSD-7320 Night at the Museum: Secret of the Tomb – Alan Silvestri
- VSD-7321 Orphan Black – Trevor Yuile (score album)
- VSD-7322 Orphan Black – Various Artists
- VSD-7323 The Newsroom – Thomas Newman / Jeff Beal (Cancelled)
- VSD-7324 The Boy Next Door – Randy Edelman / Nathan Barr
- VSD-7325 Virunga – Patrick Jonsson (limited)
- VSD-7327 The Great Human Odyssey – Darren Fung
- VSD-7340 Desert Dancer – Benjamin Wallfisch
- VSD-7342 At Long Last Love – Cole Porter
- VSD-7343 The Music of Patrick Doyle: Piano Solo – Patrick Doyle
- VSD-7344 Jane Got a Gun – Lisa Gerrard / Marcello De Francisci (Cancelled)
- VSD-7345 Killer Klowns from Outer Space: Reimagined – John Massari (re-recording)
- VSD-7348 I Am Big Bird: The Caroll Spinney Story – Joshua Johnson
- VSD-7349 The Woman Astronaut – Penka Kouneva
- VSD-7353 12 Monkeys – Trevor Rabin / Paul Linford
- VSD-7354 Jonathan Strange & Mr Norrell – Benoît Charest / Benoît Groulx
- VSD-7355 The Librarians – Joseph LoDuca
- VSD-7356 Self/less – Antônio Pinto / Dudu Aram
- VSD-7359 Pixels – Henry Jackman
- VSD-7360 Maggie – David Wingo (Digital release, CD cancelled)
- VSD-7363 House of Cards: Season 3 – Jeff Beal
- VSD-7364 Extinction – Sergio Moure de Oteyza (limited)
- VSD-7365 Z For Zachariah – Heather McIntosh
- VSD-7368 Everest – Dario Marianelli
- VSD-7369 Sicario – Jóhann Jóhannsson
- VSD-7370 Jenny's Wedding – Brian Byrne
- VSD-7371 A Walk in the Woods – Nathan Larson / Various Artists
- VSD-7373 Rock the Kasbah – Marcelo Zarvos / Various Artists
- VSD-7374 The Affair – Marcelo Zarvos
- VSD-7377 Momentum – Laurent Eyquem
- VSD-7380 Carol – Carter Burwell / Various Artists
- VSD-7381 Ray Donovan – Marcelo Zarvos / Various Artists
- VSD-7383 Truth – Brian Tyler
- VSD-7384 The Final Girls – Gregory James Jenkins
- VSD-7585 Steve McQueen: The Man & Le Mans – Jim Copperthwaite
- VSD-7386 Flesh and Bone – Dave Porter
- VSD-7387 Ash vs Evil Dead – Joseph LoDuca
- VSD-7388 Remember – Mychael Danna
- VSD-7392 Pride and Prejudice and Zombies – Fernando Velázquez
- VSD-7393 Person of Interest: Seasons 3 & 4 – Ramin Djawadi
- VSD-7395 The Electric Horseman – Dave Grusin / Willie Nelson (Reissue of Columbia Records CD)
- VSD-7397 Star Trek Beyond – Michael Giacchino
- VSD-7398 Jesse Stone: The Ultimate Collection – Jeff Beal
- VSD-7399 House of Cards: Season 4 – Jeff Beal
- VSD-7401 Gods of Egypt – Marco Beltrami
- VSD-7402 Revelation – Neal Acree
- VSD-7407 American Flyers – Lee Ritenour / Greg Mathieson (First time on CD)
- VSD-7411 Nighthawks – Keith Emerson
- VSD-7412 Before I Wake – the Newton Brothers & Danny Elfman (limited release)
- VSD-7413 Eddie the Eagle – Matthew Margeson
- VSD-7419 Foul Play – Charles Fox (reissue)
- VSD-7420 The Champ – Dave Grusin
- VSD-7425 Roots: The Saga of an American Family – Quincy Jones (Reissue of A&M Records CD)
- VSD-7426 Pee-wee's Big Holiday – Mark Mothersbaugh
- VSD-7427 Good Times – Sonny Bono & Cher
- VSD-7428 Voices – Jimmy Webb (First time on CD)
- VSD-7429 Z: The Beginning of Everything – Marcelo Zarvos
- VSD-7430 Popeye: The Deluxe Edition – Harry Nilsson / Various Artists
- VSD-7436 Barbarella – Charles Fox & Bob Crewe
- VSD-7438 Now You See Me 2 – Brian Tyler
- VSD-7439 Howard Lovecraft and the Frozen Kingdom – George Streicher
- VSD-7441 City Heat – Lennie Niehaus / Various Artists (Reissue of Warner Bros. Records LP)
- VSD-7445 Ice Age: Collision Course – John Debney
- VSD-7446 Their Finest – Rachel Portman
- VSD-7447 The 9th Life of Louis Drax – Patrick Watson
- VSD-7448 Electronic Meditation – Tangerine Dream
- VSD-7450 The Very Best of England Dan & John Ford Coley
- VSD-7452 Sully – Clint Eastwood, Christian Jacob and the Tierney Sutton Band
- VSD-7453 Abzû – Austin Wintory
- VSD-7458 Hacksaw Ridge – Rupert Gregson-Williams
- VSD-7459 Wheeler – Stephen Dorff / Various Artists
- VSD-7460 Penny Dreadful: Seasons 2 & 3 – Abel Korzeniowski
- VSD-7469 Muhammad Ali: The Greatest – Michael Masser / George Benson (reissue)
- VSD-7471 XXX: Return of Xander Cage – Brian Tyler & Robert Lydecker
- VSD-7472 John Wick: Chapter 2 – Tyler Bates & Joel J. Richard / Various Artists
- VSD-7454 Orange Sunshine – Matt Costa
- VSD-7475 The Man in the High Castle: Seasons 1 & 2 – Henry Jackman & Dominic Lewis
- VSD-7476 Sleepless – Michael Kamm & Jaro Messerschmidt
- VSD-7477 The Man from Snowy River and Other Themes for Piano – Bruce Rowland
- VSD-7478 John Williams: Themes and Transcriptions for Piano – John Williams / Simone Pedroni
- VSD-7482 Gold – Various Artists
- VSD-7483 The Founder – Carter Burwell
- VSD-7484 Power Rangers – Brian Tyler
- VSD-7485 A United Kingdom – Patrick Doyle
- VSD-7486 On Golden Pond – Dave Grusin (Reissue of MCA Records LP)
- VSD-7487 Julie's Greenroom – Ryan Shore & Julie Andrews
- VSD-7488 Bosch – Jesse Voccia
- VSD-7490 The House – Andrew Feltenstein & John Nau / Various Artists
- VSD-7494 22 – Lisa Gerrard & James Orr
- VSD-7495 Thief of Hearts – Giorgio Moroder & Harold Faltermeyer / Various Artists (Reissue of Casablanca Records CD)
- VSD-7501 The Big Sick – Michael Andrews / Various Artists
- VSD2-7504 House of Cards: Season 5 – Jeff Beal
- VSD-7505 The Putin Interviews – Jeff Beal (limited)
- VSD-7507 Harper Valley P.T.A. – Various Artists (LP reissue)
- VSD-7508 Kodachrome – Agatha Kaspar
- VSD-7509 Jasmine – Shie Rozow (Limited to 300 copies)
- VSD-7511 Shimmer Lake – Joseph Trapanese (limited)
- VSD-7512 E.B. White's Charlotte's Web – Richard M. Sherman & Robert B. Sherman (CD reissue)
- VSD2-7514 Gypsy: Season 1 – Jeff Beal (limited)
- VSD-7516 American Assassin – Steven Price
- VSD-7519 12 Monkeys: Season 3 – Stephen Barton
- VSD-7522 Loveless – Evgueni and Sacha Galperine
- VSD-7523 Jean-Michel Bernard Plays Lalo Schifrin – Lalo Schifrin / Jean-Michel Bernard
- VSD-7524 Cello – Randy Kerber
- VSD-7525 The Limehouse Golem – Johan Söderqvist (limited)
- VSD-7527 American Made – Christophe Beck / Various Artists
- VSD-7528 Breathe – Nitin Sawhney
- VSD-7529 Hampstead – Stephen Warbeck (limited)
- VSD-7530 Smokey and the Bandit: 40th Anniversary – Bill Justis / Various Artists & Smokey and the Bandit II – Various Artists (Reissue of MCA Records LPs)
- VSD-7532 Sounder – Taj Mahal (Reissue of MCA Records CD)
- VSD-7535 Tooth and Tail – Austin Wintory
- VSD-7536 Three Billboards Outside Ebbing, Missouri – Carter Burwell / Various Artists
- VSD-7540 The Nut Job 2: Nutty by Nature – Heitor Pereira (limited)
- VSD-7541 Only the Brave – Joseph Trapanese
- VSD-7543 Chappaquiddick – Garth Stevenson
- VSD-7545 Jungle – Johnny Klimek
- VSD-7547 24 Hours to Live – Tyler Bates
- VSD-7550 The Rebirth of Id – Penka Kouneva
- VSD-7554 Fletch – Harold Faltermeyer / Various Artists (Reissue of MCA Records LP)
- VSD-7555 Hangman – Frederik Wiedmann
- VSD-7556 Knight Rider – Stu Phillips (limited edition CD with unreleased music.)
- VSD-7557 The Commuter – Roque Baños
- VSD-7559 Into the Badlands – David Shephard
- VSD-7560 Sirens: Music Inspired by Homer's Odyssey – Craig Safan
- VSD-7562 Submergence – Fernando Velázquez
- VSD-7563 Wilson's Heart – Christopher Young
- VSD-7564 Ghost Stories – Frank Ilfman
- VSD-7565 Life of the Party – Fil Eisler / Various Artists
- VSD-7567 The Strangers: Prey at Night – Adrian Johnston
- VSD-7568 I Kill Giants – Laurent Perez Del Mar
- VSD-7569 Into the Badlands: Season 2 – Trevor Yuile
- VSD-7570 Nostalgia – Laurent Eyquem
- VSD-7571 Bad Samaritan – Joseph LoDuca
- VSD-7579 Timeless – Robert Duncan
- VSD-7580 Sgt. Stubby: An American Hero – Patrick Doyle
- VSD-7582 Play It Again, Marvin! – Marvin Hamlisch / J. Ernest Green conductor (live concert)
- VSD-7584 Sicario: Day of the Soldado – Hildur Guðnadóttir
- VSD-7585 Shock and Awe – Jeff Beal

== The New VSD Series (2018–present) ==
The label was acquired by Concord Music in 2018 and abandoned the PolyGram/Universal numbering system. A new series was started as a result of Concord's UPC prefix. The rest of the UPC does not necessarily match the catalog number and all have the VSD prefix regardless of format. LP versions are in a separate section. This list concentrates on the CD portion and not digital releases.

- VSD-00003 A Private War – H. Scott Salinas
- VSD-00011 Emmet Otter's Jug-Band Christmas – Paul Williams
- VSD-00013 Leaving on a Jet Plane – the Mitchell Trio & Denver, Boise, and Johnson
- VSD-00020 The Zombies: The Complete Studio Recordings – the Zombies
- VSD-00021 The Old Man & the Gun – Daniel Hart
- VSD-00031 The Other Side of the Mountain Part 2 – Lee Holdridge
- VSD-00036 The West Wing – W.G."Snuffy" Walden
- VSD-00039 Krypton – Pinar Toprak
- VSD-00072 Lonesome Dove – Basil Poledouris (reissue)
- VSD-00082 House of Cards: Season 6 – Jeff Beal
- VSD-00085 The Son – Nathan Barr
- VSD-00086 Hotel Mumbai – Volker Bertelmann (aka Hauschka)
- VSD-00090 Cold Pursuit – George Fenton
- VSD-00105 John Wick: Chapter 3 – Parabellum – Tyler Bates & Joel J. Richard
- VSD-00110 The Goonies – Dave Grusin (Public release)
- VSD-00124 Anne with an E – Amin Bhatia & Ari Posner
- VSD-00133 The Peanut Butter Falcon – Jonathan Sadoff, Zach Dawes, Noam Pikelny & Gabe Witcher / Various Artists
- VSD-00161 The Dark Crystal: Age of Resistance: Volume 1 – Daniel Pemberton
- VSD-00164 The Dark Crystal: Age of Resistance: Volume 2 – Daniel Pemberton / Samuel Sim
- VSD-00174 Midway (2019) – Harald Kloser & Thomas Wander
- VSD-00220 Whiplash: The Deluxe Edition – Justin Hurwitz & Tim Simonec / Various Artists
- VSD-00222 Hackers – Simon Boswell / Various Artists
- VSD-00238 The Buddy Holly Story: The Deluxe Edition – Various Artists
- VSD-00247 Army of Darkness – Joseph LoDuca, Danny Elfman ("March of the Dead" theme) (Reissue of VSD-5411; limited to 1500 copiesl)
- VSD-00256 Star Wars: Shadows of the Empire – Joel McNeely / John Williams ("Star Wars" theme) (Reissue of VSDE-5700; limited to 1500 copies)
- VSD-00259 Dracula 2000 – Marco Beltrami (Reissue; limited edition of 1500 copies)
- VSD-00336 The Trial of the Chicago 7 – Daniel Pemberton
- VSD-00401 Scream: Original Motion Picture Soundtracks (Scream /Scream 2 /Scream 3 /Scream 4) – Marco Beltrami (Limited to 1800 Copies; website exclusive)
- VSD-00482 Scream (aka. Scream 5) – Brian Tyler (CD was limited1800 Copies; website exclusive)
- VSD-0500 Firestarter – Tangerine Dream (The CD is limited to 1500 Copies; website exclusive)
- VSD-0542 Three O'Clock High – Tangerine Dream / Sylvester Levay (limited to 1500 Copies)
- VSD-TBD Rodgers and Hammerstein's The Sound of Music – Julie Andrews, Christopher Plummer & Various Artists
- VSD-TBD Scream VI – Brian Tyler / Sven Falconer
- VSD-TBD Little Richard: I Am Everything – Little Richard / Tamar-Kali Brown
- VSD-TBD The Matrix: 25th Anniversary Edition – Don Davis (Public release of the original 2008 Varèse Club)

== Varèse Sarabande CD Club (1989–1992) ==
The CD Club debuted in March 1989 as mail order exclusives with limited edition discs. This first incarnation of the club ran from 1989 to 1992. Varèse Sarabande reissue scores from older or unsuccessful films as well as titles that were unavailable as regular releases. All were hand numbered with limited to runs of 1000 to 2500. The catalog numbers correspond to the month and year of release with the volume number following the decimal.

- VCL 8903.1 Cherry 2000 – Basil Poledouris
- VCL 8903.2 Fedora / Crisis ("Guitar Suite") – Miklós Rózsa
- VCL 8903.3 Symphonic Suites – Pino Donaggio (Previously released on LP)
- VCL 9001.4 Vibes – James Horner
- VCL 9001.5 The Rose Tattoo – Alex North
- VCL 9001.6 Red Sonja / Bloodline – Ennio Morricone
- VCL 9101.7 Raggedy Man – Jerry Goldsmith
- VCL 9101.8 Stars and Bars – Elmer Bernstein (Rejected score)
- VCL 9101.9 Eye of the Needle / Last Embrace – Miklós Rózsa
- VCL 9201.10 The 'Burbs – Jerry Goldsmith
- VCL 9201.11 The Film Music of Alfred Newman – Alfred Newman
- VCL 9201.12 We're No Angels – George Fenton

Two special budget releases appeared in 1992 for the final club year. They were limited to 1000 copies and sold out quickly.

- BCL 6001 Jagged Edge – John Barry
- BCL 6002 Flesh+Blood – Basil Poledouris

== Varèse Sarabande CD Club (2001–present) ==
The return of the Varèse Club was announced in 1998 and launched in November 2001.

Club titles released quarterly, usually with up to four albums. It uses the same numbering system as the previous club. The label slowed down production in 2013.

This line featured the Encore Series. It reissued of out-of-print catalog titles with many limited to 1000 copies.

- VCL 1101-1001 Heartbeeps – John Williams
- VCL 1101-1002 Project X – James Horner
- VCL 1101-1003 Marie Ward – Elmer Bernstein
- VCL 0202-1004 Die Hard – Michael Kamen
- VCL 0202-1005 The Long, Hot Summer / Sanctuary – Alex North
- VCL 0202-1006 Love Is a Many-Splendored Thing – Alfred Newman
- VCL 0502-1007 The Ballad of Cable Hogue – Jerry Goldsmith
- VCL 0502-1008 Cast a Giant Shadow – Elmer Bernstein
- VCL 0502-1009 The Virgin Queen – Franz Waxman
- VCL 0702-1010 The Sand Pebbles: The Deluxe Edition – Jerry Goldsmith
- VCL 0702-1011 The Fury: The Deluxe Edition – John Williams
- VCL 0702-1012 Romancing the Stone – Alan Silvestri
- VCL 0702-1013 The Bride – Maurice Jarre
- VCL 1102-1014 Home Alone 2: Lost in New York: The Deluxe Edition – John Williams
- VCL 1102-1015 Big – Howard Shore
- VCL 1102-1016 Studs Lonigan – Jerry Goldsmith
- VCL 0403-1017 Hawaii: The Deluxe Edition – Elmer Bernstein
- VCL 0403-1018 Magic – Jerry Goldsmith
- VCL 0403-1019 Beloved Infidel – Franz Waxman
- VCL 0403-1020 The Return of a Man Called Horse: The Deluxe Edition – Laurence Rosenthal
- VCL 0703-1021 Varèse Sarabande 25th Anniversary Collection: Volume Two – Various Artists
- VCL 0803-1022 Predator – Alan Silvestri
- VCL 0803-1023 Justine: The Deluxe Edition – Jerry Goldsmith
- VCL 0803-1024 The Story of Ruth – Franz Waxman
- VCL 1103-1025 The Robe: The Deluxe Edition – Alfred Newman
- VCL 1103-1026 Commando – James Horner
- VCL 1103-1027 The Island – Ennio Morricone
- VCL 0204-1028 Jerry Goldsmith at 20th Century Fox – Jerry Goldsmith
- VCL 0804-1029 The Great Escape: The Deluxe Edition – Elmer Bernstein
- VCL 0804-1030 Fitzwilly / The Long Goodbye – John Williams
- VCL 0804-1031 Piranha – Pino Donaggio
- VCL 1104-1032 The Agony and the Ecstasy: The Deluxe Edition – Alex North / The Artist Who Did Not Want to Paint – Jerry Goldsmith
- VCL 1104-1033 Three Coins in the Fountain – Victor Young
- VCL 1104-1034 Sheena – Richard Hartley
- VCL 0505-1035 Alien Nation (rejected score) – Jerry Goldsmith
- VCL 0505-1036 Désirée – Alex North
- VCL 0505-1037 Making the Grade – Basil Poledouris / Various Artists
- VCL 0805-1038 Spacehunter: Adventures in the Forbidden Zone – Elmer Bernstein
- VCL 0805-1039 F.I.S.T. / Slow Dancing in the Big City – Bill Conti
- VCL 0805-1040 True Confessions – Georges Delerue
- VCL 0805-1041 The Kindred – David Newman
- VCL 1105-1042 Broadcast News – Bill Conti / Michael Gore, Michel Camilo* (*additional music)
- VCL 1105-1043 The Scalphunters – Elmer Bernstein
- VCL 1105-1044 The Left Hand of God – Victor Young
- VCL 1105-1045 Top Secret! – Maurice Jarre
- VCL 0306-1046 Ghostbusters – Elmer Bernstein
- VCL 0306-1047 Rookie of the Year / A Night in the Life of Jimmy Reardon / Bushwhacked – Bill Conti
- VCL 0306-1048 Return to Peyton Place – Franz Waxman
- VCL 0306-1049 An Almost Perfect Affair – Georges Delerue
- VCL 0706-1050 Gloria – Bill Conti
- VCL 0706-1051 The War of the Roses / The Sandlot – David Newman
- VCL 0706-1052 An Unfinished Life (rejected score) / 14 Unfinished Lives for Solo Piano – Christopher Young
- VCL 0706-1053 Sky Bandits – Alfi Kabiljo
- VCL 1106-1054 Birdman of Alcatraz – Elmer Bernstein
- VCL 1106-1055 Runaway: The Deluxe Edition – Jerry Goldsmith
- VCL 1106-1056 Lucas – Dave Grusin
- VCL 1106-1057 Seven Cities of Gold / The Rains of Ranchipur – Hugo Friedhofer
- VCL 1106-1058 Careful, He Might Hear You – Ray Cook
- VCL 0307-1059 The Karate Kid Box (The Karate Kid / The Karate Kid Part II / The Karate Kid Part III / The Next Karate Kid) – Bill Conti
- VCL 0307-1060 The Vanishing – Jerry Goldsmith
- VCL 0307-1061 Author! Author! – Dave Grusin / Author! Author! (rejected score) – Johnny Mandel
- VCL 0307-1062 84 Charing Cross Road – George Fenton
- VCL 0707-1063 The 'Burbs: The Deluxe Edition – Jerry Goldsmith
- VCL 0707-1064 F/X: The Deluxe Edition – Bill Conti
- VCL 0707-1065 Les Misérables – Alex North
- VCL 0707-1066 Anne of the Indies / Man on a Tightrope – Franz Waxman
- VCL 1107-1067 North by Northwest – Bernard Herrmann / Joel McNeely conducts (re-recording)
- VCL 1107-1068 Neighbors – Bill Conti / Neighbors (1981) (rejected score) – Tom Scott
- VCL 1107-1069 By Love Possessed – Elmer Bernstein
- VCL 1107-1070 The Tall Men – Victor Young
- VCL 1107-1071 Magic Fire – Richard Wagner / Erich Wolfgang Korngold, arranger and conductor
- VCL 0208-1072 North and South – Bill Conti
- VCL 0208-1073 The Caretakers / The Young Doctors – Elmer Bernstein
- VCL 0208-1074 Viva Zapata! / The 13th Letter – Alex North
- VCL 0208-1075 Matilda – David Newman
- VCL 0608-1076 Gangs of New York / The Journey of Natty Gann / The Scarlet Letter (rejected scores box set) – Elmer Bernstein
- VCL 0608-1077 Iron Eagle – Basil Poledouris
- VCL 0608-1078 My Cousin Rachel – Franz Waxman
- VCL 0608-1079 The Man Who Loved Women – Henry Mancini
- VCL 0608-1080 In a Shallow Grave – Jonathan Sheffer
- VCL 0908-1081 The Matrix: The Deluxe Edition – Don Davis
- VCL 0908-1082 North and South: Book II – Bill Conti
- VCL 0908-1083 Anna Lucasta – Elmer Bernstein
- VCL 0908-1084 Pony Soldier – Alex North
- VCL 0908-1085 Vamp – Jonathan Elias
- VCL 1108-1086 Short Circuit – David Shire
- VCL 1108-1087 Report to the Commissioner – Elmer Bernstein
- VCL 1108-1088 The President's Lady – Alfred Newman
- VCL 1108-1089 Silver Bullet – Jay Chattaway
- VCL 0309-1090 Hanover Street – John Barry
- VCL 0309-1091 Nightwing – Henry Mancini
- VCL 0309-1092 Lure of the Wilderness – Franz Waxman
- VCL 0309-1093 Russkies – James Newton Howard
- VCL 0609-1094 Lonely Are the Brave – Jerry Goldsmith
- VCL 0609-1095 The Right Stuff – Bill Conti
- VCL 0609-1096 Norma Rae – David Shire
- VCL 0609-1097 Hard Contract – Alex North
- VCL 0909-1098 Escape from the Planet of the Apes – Jerry Goldsmith
- VCL 0909-1099 Crime in the Streets – Franz Waxman
- VCL 0909-1100 A Walk in the Spring Rain – Elmer Bernstein
- VCL 0909-1101 Children of the Corn – Jonathan Elias
- VCL 1209-1102 Freud: The Deluxe Edition – Jerry Goldsmith
- VCL 1209-1103 Bird of Paradise – Daniele Amfitheatrof / Lydia Bailey – Hugo Friedhofer
- VCL 0310-1104 The Goonies – Dave Grusin
- VCL 0310-1105 The Spiral Road – Jerry Goldsmith
- VCL 0310-1106 The Scout / Dreamer – Bill Conti
- VCL 0310-1107 The Manhattan Project – Philippe Sarde
- VCL 0410-1108 Star Trek: The Deluxe Edition – Michael Giacchino
- VCL 0610-1109 Spartacus – Alex North (limited edition of 5000 copies)
- VCL 0910-1110 A Gathering of Eagles – Jerry Goldsmith
- VCL 0910-1111 The Snake Pit – Alfred Newman / The Three Faces of Eve – Robert E. Dolan
- VCL 0910-1112 The Formula – Bill Conti
- VCL 0910-1113 Fimucité 2: Closing Night Gala 2008 (DVD & CD) – Diego Navarro and Joel McNeely, conductors
- VCL 0910-1114 Nightflyers – Doug Timm
- VCL 1110-1115 Family Plot – John Williams
- VCL 1110-1116 Taps – Maurice Jarre
- VCL 1110-1117 The Karate Kid – Bill Conti
- VCL 1110-1118 Home Movies – Pino Donaggio
- VCL 0511-1119 The Alfred Hitchcock Hour: Volume One – Bernard Herrmann
- VCL 0511-1120 Scream: The Deluxe Edition – Marco Beltrami
- VCL 0511-1121 My Demon Lover – David Newman / Ed Alton (additional music)
- VCL 0511-1122 Fimucité 3: Jerry Goldsmith 80th Birthday Tribute Concert (DVD & CD) – Mark Snow & Diego Navarro, conductors
- VCL 0711-1123 The Egyptian: The Deluxe Edition – Alfred Newman & Bernard Herrmann
- VCL 1011-1124 Midway – John Williams
- VCL 1011-1125 The Alfred Hitchcock Hour: Volume Two – Bernard Herrmann
- VCL 1011-1126 Mimic: The Deluxe Edition – Marco Beltrami
- VCL 1011-1127 The Karate Kid Part II – Bill Conti
- VCL 1211-1128 Bernard Herrmann at 20th Century Fox – Bernard Herrmann
- VCL 0512-1129 Chinatown – Jerry Goldsmith (Reissue of 1995 Varèse Sarabande release)
- VCL 0512-1130 The Alfred Hitchcock Hour: Volume Three – Lyn Murray, Leonard Rosenman, Lalo Schifrin and Benny Carter
- VCL 0512-1131 The Karate Kid Part III – Bill Conti
- VCL 0512-1132 Eye of the Needle (Varèse Encore) – Miklós Rózsa
- VCL 0512-1133 Amazing Grace and Chuck (Varèse Encore) – Elmer Bernstein
- VCL 0512-1134 The Clan of the Cave Bear (Varèse Encore) – Alan Silvestri
- VCL 0512-1135 Alien: A Biomechanical Symphony – Fimucité 3 (DVD & CD) – Diego Navarro, conductor
- VCL 0712-1136 Crimes of the Heart (Varèse Encore) – Georges Delerue
- VCL 0712-1137 Tai-Pan (Varèse Encore) – Maurice Jarre
- VCL 1012-1138 Die Hard 2: Die Harder: The Deluxe Edition – Michael Kamen
- VCL 1012-1139 The Red Pony – Jerry Goldsmith
- VCL 1012-1140 Enemy Mine: The Deluxe Edition – Maurice Jarre
- VCL 1012-1141 The Boy Who Could Fly (Varèse Encore) – Bruce Broughton
- VCL 1012-1142 Man on Fire (Varèse Encore) – John Scott
- VCL 1213-1143 Star Trek: Nemesis: The Deluxe Edition – Jerry Goldsmith
- VCL 1213-1144 The Abyss: The Deluxe Edition – Alan Silvestri
- VCL 1213-1145 Brass Target – Laurence Rosenthal
- VCL 1213-1146 Suspect (Varèse Encore) – Michael Kamen
- VCL 1213-1147 Vibes (Varèse Encore) – James Horner
- VCL 1213-1148 Runaway (Varèse Encore) – Jerry Goldsmith (Reissue of Varèse Club deluxe edition)
- VCL 0214-1149 The List of Adrian Messenger – Jerry Goldsmith
- VCL 0714-1150 Star Trek Into Darkness: The Deluxe Edition – Michael Giacchino
- VCL 1114-1151 Predator 2: The Deluxe Edition – Alan Silvestri
- VCL 1114-1152 Peggy Sue Got Married: The Deluxe Edition – John Barry
- VCL 1114-1153 For Whom the Bell Tolls – Victor Young (Reissue of original Stanyan Records release)
- VCL 1114-1154 Fedora (Varèse Encore) – Miklós Rózsa (Less content than the original Varèse Club release)
- VCL 0615-1155 Back in Time ... 1985 at the Movies – David Newman conductor / Various Artists
- VCL 0615-1156 Gremlins 2: The New Batch: 25th Anniversary Edition – Jerry Goldsmith
- VCL 0615-1157 Outbreak: The Deluxe Edition – James Newton Howard
- VCL 0715-1158 Fimucité 6: Universal Pictures 100th Anniversary Gala – Diego Navarro, conductor
- VCL 1015-1159 Back to the Future Part III: 25th Anniversary Edition – Alan Silvestri
- VCL 1015-1160 Chain Reaction: The Deluxe Edition – Jerry Goldsmith
- VCL 1015-1161 Where the River Runs Black (Varèse Encore) – James Horner
- VCL 1215-1162 North and South: Highlights – Bill Conti
- VCL 1215-1163 Spies Like Us (Varèse Encore) – Elmer Bernstein
- VCL 0216-1164 Executive Decision: The Deluxe Edition – Jerry Goldsmith
- VCL 0216-1165 Cocoon: The Return: The Deluxe Edition – James Horner
- VCL 0216-1166 Bloodline – Ennio Morricone / Craig Hundley (additional music, as Craig Huxley)
- VCL 0216-1167 The Whales of August (Varèse Encore) – Alan Price
- VCL 0516-1168 Starship Troopers: The Deluxe Edition – Basil Poledouris
- VCL 0516-1169 Volcano: The Deluxe Edition – Alan Silvestri
- VCL 0516-1170 Spartacus: The Complete Album Masters – Alex North
- VCL 0516-1171 Zelly and Me (Varèse Encore) – Pino Donaggio
- VCL 0916-1172 Hellboy: The Deluxe Edition – Marco Beltrami
- VCL 0916-1173 RoboCop 3: The Deluxe Edition – Basil Poledouris
- VCL 0916-1174 Jagged Edge (Varèse Encore) – John Barry
- VCL 1016-1175 The Omen: 40th Anniversary Edition – Jerry Goldsmith
- VCL 1016-1176 Scream 2: The Deluxe Edition – Marco Beltrami
- VCL 1216-1177 Star Trek Beyond: The Deluxe Edition – Michael Giacchino
- VCL 0317-1178 Stanley & Iris: The Deluxe Edition / Pete 'n' Tillie – John Williams
- VCL 0317-1179 Under Siege 2: Dark Territory: The Deluxe Edition – Basil Poledouris
- VCL 0317-1180 The Black Cauldron (Varèse Encore) – Elmer Bernstein
- VCL 0618-1184 The Cowboys: The Deluxe Edition – John Williams
- VCL 0618-1185 Small Soldiers: The Deluxe Edition – Jerry Goldsmith
- VCL 0618-1186 Georges Delerue: The Complete London Sessions – Georges Delerue
- VCL 0618-1187 Heathers (Varèse Encore) – David Newman
- VCL 1018-1188 Dracula: The Deluxe Edition – John Williams
- VCL 1018-1189 On Deadly Ground: The Deluxe Edition – Basil Poledouris
- VCL 1018-1190 A Show of Force (Varèse Encore) – Georges Delerue
- VCL 0219 1191 RoboCop 2: The Deluxe Edition – Leonard Rosenman
- VCL 0219-1192 Dreamcatcher: The Deluxe Edition – James Newton Howard
- VCL 0219-1193 Raggedy Man (Varèse Encore) – Jerry Goldsmith
- VCL 0919-1194 Star Trek: The Deluxe Edition – Michael Giacchino (Reissue of 2010 two-disc set)
- VCL 0919-1195 Air Force One: The Deluxe Edition – Jerry Goldsmith / Joel McNeely
- VCL 0919-1196 Rooster Cogburn: The Deluxe Edition – Laurence Rosenthal
- VCL 1115-1197 The Stand: The Deluxe Edition – W. G. Snuffy Walden (Reissue)
- VCL 1115-1198 U.S. Marshals: The Deluxe Edition – Jerry Goldsmith
- VCL 1115-1199 Dolores Claiborne: The Deluxe Edition – Danny Elfman
- VCL 0520 1201 The Running Man: The Deluxe Edition – Harold Faltermeyer
- VCL 0520-1202 SeaQuest DSV: The Deluxe Edition – John Debney
- VCL 0820-1204 Wild Wild West: The Deluxe Edition – Elmer Bernstein
- VCL 1020-1205 How to Train Your Dragon: The Deluxe Edition – John Powell
- VCL 1020-1206 Village of the Damned: The Deluxe Edition – John Carpenter & Dave Davies
- VCL 1120-1207 Looney Tunes: Back in Action: The Deluxe Edition – Jerry Goldsmith / John Debney & Cameron Patrick (additional music)
- VCL 1120-1208 Babe: The Deluxe Edition – Nigel Westlake (Debut of complete score without dialogue or songs)
- VCL 0321-1209 Along Came a Spider: The Deluxe Edition – Jerry Goldsmith
- VCL 0321-1210 The Serpent and the Rainbow: The Deluxe Edition – Brad Fiedel / Babatunde Olatunji
- VCL 0521-1211 Lionheart: The Deluxe Edition – Jerry Goldsmith
- VCL 0521-1212 Knowing: The Deluxe Edition – Marco Beltrami
- VCL 0621-1213 Paycheck: The Deluxe Edition – John Powell
- VCL 0621-1214 The Matrix: The Complete Edition – Don Davis
- VCL 0621-1214 The Matrix: The Complete Edition (SCAD Edition) – Don Davis
- VCL 0821-1216 Love Field: The Deluxe Edition – Jerry Goldsmith/Bill Payne (Jazz Source tracks)
- VCL 0821-1217 Dante's Peak: The Deluxe Edition – John Frizzell/James Newton Howard
- VCL 1021-1218 The Crow: The Deluxe Edition – Graeme Revell
- VCL 1221-1219 Elf: The Deluxe Edition – John Debney
- VCL 1221-1220 Blue Velvet: The Deluxe Edition – Angelo Badalamenti/Various
- VCL 0322-1221 Iron Giant: The Deluxe Edition – Michael Kamen
- VCL 0322-1222 How To Train Your Dragon 2: The Deluxe Edition – John Powell
- VCL 0422-1223 Mimic: The Deluxe Edition – Marco Beltrami (Reissue with new content)
- VCL 0622-1226 The Bourne Identity: The Tumescent Edition – John Powell
- VCL 0622-1227 Presumed Innocent: The Deluxe Edition – John Williams
- VCL 1122-1228 Death Becomes Her: The Deluxe Edition – Alan Silvestri
- VCL 1122-1229 Lara Croft Tomb Raider: The Cradle of Life: The Deluxe Edition – Alan Silvestri
- VCL 1122-1230 L.A.Confidential: The Deluxe Edition – Jerry Goldsmith
- VCL 0223-1231 The Time Machine: The Deluxe Edition – Klaus Badelt
- VCL 0723-1234 City Hall: The Deluxe Edition – Jerry Goldsmith
- VCL 0723-1236 Mouse Hunt: The Deluxe Edition – Alan Silvestri
- VCL 0823-1232 April Fools Day: The Deluxe Edition – Charles Bernstein (includes bonus material)
- VCL 0823-1233 Blood Simple: The Deluxe Edition – Carter Burwell
- VCL 1123-1234 Pleasantville: The Deluxe Edition – Randy Newman
- VCL 1123-1235 Serenity: The Deluxe Edition – David Newman
- VCL 0224-1237 How To Train Your Dragon: The Hidden World The Deluxe Edition – John Powell
- VCL 0224-1238 Hellboy 2: The Golden Army The Deluxe Edition – Danny Elfman
- VCL 0524-1239 Doom: The Deluxe Edition – Clint Mansell
- VCL 0524-1240 What Lies Beneath: The Deluxe Edition – Alan Silvestri
- VCL 0724-1241 For Love Of The Game: The Deluxe Edition – Basil Poledoruis
- VCL 0724-1242 Eye Of The Needle: The Deluxe Edition – Miklos Rosza
- VCL 0924-1243 Sudden Death: The Deluxe Edition – John Debney
- VCL 0924-1244 The Other: The Deluxe Edition – Jerry Goldsmith
- VCL 1124-1145 Blade: The Deluxe Edition – Mark Isham
- VCL 1124-1246 Blade 2: The Deluxe Edition – Marco Beltrami
- VCL 1224-1247 RoboCop 3: The Deluxe Encore Edition – Basil Poledouris (Reissue of 2016 release)
- VCL 0425- The Thorn Birds: The Deluxe Encore Edition – Henry Mancini
- VCL 0425- A Little Princess: The Deluxe Edition – Patrick Doyle
- VSD-00198 The Big Fix – Bill Conti (This was assigned a non-sequential number)

== The Limited Edition Series (2009–2018) ==
The Limited Edition Series was created in 2009 as an offshoot of the CD Club and concentrates on soundtracks for direct to video films, short-run theatrical titles, mini-series, and television series. The majority of titles under this banner are limited to 1000 copies and look like the standard Varèse Sarabande with slight changes to the branding. The label occasionally offered signed autographed booklets of these releases.

- VLE-3201 Film Music Festival Kraków 2015 – Various Artists
- VLE-3202 Film Music Festival Kraków 2016 – Various Artists
- VLE-3209 Film Music Festival Kraków 2017 – Various Artists
- VLE-4201 The Stoning of Soraya M. – John Debney
- VLE-4202 In the Electric Mist – Marco Beltrami
- VLE-4203 Jesse Stone: Stone Cold – Jeff Beal (Later released on CD, featuring more music)
- VLE-4204 The Killing Room – Brian Tyler
- VLE-4205 Oscar: The Color of Destiny / Mira La Luna ("Look at the Moon") – Diego Navarro
- VLE-4206 Passchendaele – Jan A. P. Kaczmarek
- VLE-4207 Lost: The Final Episodes – Michael Giacchino
- VLE-4208 The Special Relationship – Alexandre Desplat
- VLE-4209 Devil – Fernando Velázquez
- VLE-4210 Hostel: Part III – Frederik Wiedmann
- VLE-4211 Columbus Circle – Brian Tyler
- VLE-4212 The Mighty Macs – William Ross
- VLE-4213 A Thousand Words – John Debney
- VLE-4214 Mimesis: Night of the Living Dead – Diego Navarro
- VLE-4215 Riddle – Scott Glasgow
- VLE-4216 The Adventurer: The Curse of the Midas Box – Fernando Velázquez
- VLE-4217 Haunt – Reinhold Heil
- VLE-4218 Wicked Blood – Elia Cmíral
- VLE-4219 No God, No Master – Nuno Malo
- VLE-4220 Third Person – Dario Marianelli
- VLE-4221 Dragonheart 3: The Sorcerer's Curse – Mark McKenzie / Randy Edelman*
- VLE-4222 Hemlock Grove: Season 2 – Nathan Barr
- VLE-4223 Jupiter Ascending – Michael Giacchino (Also released by Sony Classical in Europe)
- VLE-4224 The SpongeBob Movie: Sponge Out of Water – John Debney
- VLE-4225 Chappie – Hans Zimmer / Steve Mazzaro / Andrew Kawczynski
- VLE-4226 The Lovers – Dirk Brossé
- VLE-4227 The Dovekeepers – Jeff Beal
- VLE-4228 Seventh Son – Marco Beltrami
- VLE-4229 Rise of the Legend – Shigeru Umebayashi
- VLE-4230 Devil's Knot – Mychael Danna
- VLE-4231 Gamba – Benjamin Wallfisch
- VLE-4232 Open Season: Scared Silly – Dominic Lewis & Rupert Gregson-Williams
- VLE-4233 Of Mind and Music – Carlos José Alvarez
- VLE-4234 USS Indianapolis: Men of Courage – Laurent Eyquem
- VLE-4235 Bitter Harvest – Benjamin Wallfisch
- VLE-4236 The Exception – Ilan Eshkeri
- VLE-4237 Passage to Dawn – Diego Navarro
- VLE-4238 Mully – Benjamin Wallfisch
- VLE-4239 The Rendezvous – Austin Wintory
- VLE-4240 The Long Road Home – Jeff Beal
- VLE-9201 Xena: Warrior Princess: 20th Anniversary Anthology – Joseph LoDuca
- VLE-9203 A Nightmare on Elm Street 8 CD Collection – Charles Bernstein/ Christopher Young/ Angelo Badalamenti / Ken Harrison/ Craig Safan/ Jay Ferguson/ Brian May/ J. Peter Robinson/ Graeme Revell
- VLE-9206 The Little Box of Horrors – Charles Bernstein/ Howard Shore/ Jay Chattaway (Maniac) / Jerry Goldsmith/ Marco Beltrami/ Richard Stone/ Brad Fiedel/ Bob Cobert
- VLE-9210 Stephen King Collection – James Newton Howard/ Tangerine Dream/ W. G. Snuffy Walden/ Nicholas Pike
- VLE-9218 Murder by Death / The Pursuit of Happiness – Dave Grusin
- VLE-9220 ...And Justice for All – Dave Grusin
- VLE-9221 Absence of Malice – Dave Grusin
- VLE-9222 Firewalker – Gary Chang
- VLE-9225 Jim Henson's The StoryTeller – Rachel Portman
- VLE-9226 Firestarter – Tangerine Dream (Reissue of 1984 MCA Records album)

== LP to CD Series (2015–2016) ==
The LP to CD Subscription Series was created June 2015 and ended in May 2016. It released titles from their past LP catalog that could be transferred from vinyl records to CDs.

The list reflects the assigned catalog number for each title and not the order in which the titles were released during the subscription.

- VLE 9200-01 A Minor Miracle – Rick Patterson
- VLE 9200-02 April Fool's Day – Charles Bernstein
- VLE 9200-03 The Whistle Blower – John Scott
- VLE 9200-04 Sister, Sister – Richard Einhorn
- VLE 9200-05 Let's Get Harry – Brad Fiedel
- VLE 9200-06 Bad Dreams – Jay Ferguson
- VLE 9200-07 Invitation au voyage – Gabriel Yared (Expanded from its original LP releases)
- VLE 9200-08 Enola Gay – Maurice Jarre
- VLE 9200-09 Blind Date – Stanley Myers / John Kongos (songs)
- VLE 9200-10 52 Pick-Up – Gary Chang
- VLE 9200-11 Mountbatten: The Last Viceroy – John Scott
- VLE 9200-12 Magnificent Obsession – Frank Skinner

== We Hear You Series (2016–2018) ==
This series started in late 2016 as a way to release titles that were highly requested by fans. The series ended in early 2018 after Concord took over the label.

- VLE-9204 Revenge of the Ninja: Enhanced Edition – Robert J. Walsh (Reimagining of the original soundtrack)
- VLE 9207 Barefoot in the Park / The Odd Couple – Neal Hefti
- VLE-9208 Boulevard Nights – Lalo Schifrin / George Benson (songs) (Reissue of 1978 Warner Bros. LP)
- VLE-9209 Down Twisted – Eric Allaman & Reinhard Scheuregger (as Berlin Game) (Reissue of LP release from the STV series)
- VLE-9211 The West Wing – W.G. "Snuffy" Walden (Later reissued in 2019 as VSD-00036)
- VLE-9212 Heaven Can Wait / Racing with the Moon – Dave Grusin (Reissue of 2013 Kritzerland Records release)
- VLE-9213 9/30/55 – Leonard Rosenman
- VLE-9214 21 Jump Street – Peter Bernstein
- VLE-9215 The Yakuza – Dave Grusin (Remastered and expanded)

== Masters Film Music (1989–1992, 2002–2016) ==
This label imprint began in 1986 after a distribution deal with Twentieth Century Fox.

The label became a full-fledged series of CDs when the club launched in 1989. It ended in 2016.

- SRS 2001 The Boys from Brazil – Jerry Goldsmith
- SRS 2002 The Wild Geese – Roy Budd
- SRS 2003 Suites and Themes – Jerry Goldsmith
- SRS 2004 Obsession – Bernard Herrmann
- SRS 2005 – SRS 2008 Bernard Herrmann Concert Suites (Four-CD box set. All titles and contents of this set are listed below)
- SRS 2005 The Concert Suites Volume 1: The Early Classics – Bernard Herrmann
- SRS 2006 The Concert Suites Volume 2: Science Fiction – Bernard Herrmann
- SRS 2007 The Concert Suites Volume 3: Alfred Hitchcock – Bernard Herrmann
- SRS 2008 The Concert Suites Volume 4: The Fantasy Films – Bernard Herrmann
- SRS 2009 The Reivers – John Williams
- SRS 2010 Lilies of the Field – Jerry Goldsmith (Cancelled. Reissued by Perseverance Records)
- SRS 2011 Under the Volcano – Alex North
- SRS 2012 Heartbeeps – John Williams (Cancelled – Released in 2001 by the CD club)
- SRS 2013 Those Secrets – Thomas Newman
- SRS 2014 Joe Versus the Volcano – Georges Delerue
- SRS 2015 The Racers / Daddy Long Legs – Alex North
- SRS 2016 The Wonderful Country / The King and Four Queens – Alex North
- SRS 2017 Viva Maria! / King of Hearts – Georges Delerue
- SRS 2018 The Hallelujah Trail – Elmer Bernstein
- SRS 2019 Cannon for Cordoba / From Noon till Three – Elmer Bernstein
- SRS 2020 Joe Versus the Volcano: The Big Woo Edition – Georges Delerue

== Varèse 500 Series (2016–2017) ==
This series was unveiled in December 2016 and was designed to reissue out-of-print titles from the entire commercial catalog. These featured new artwork and was limited to 500 copies. The series appears to be dormant.

- VSD-500 Agnes of God – Georges Delerue
- VSD-501 The Winds of War – Bob Cobert
- VSD-502 Journey to the Center of the Earth – Bernard Herrmann

== Andante Records (1982–1984) ==
This offshoot was meant for classical releases during the early 1980s, though two film soundtracks were also produced. The prefix for the LPs started with AD and their CDs with ACD.

Some releases made it to the CD format in 1984, but the project was cancelled that year. Many of the classical titles released on LP were reissued as part of Varèse's 47000 CD series.

- AD-72401 Liszt: Symphony No. 2 "Dante" – Varujan Kojian, Utah Symphony Orchestra
- AD-72402 Harris: Symphony No. 6 Gettysburg / Ives: Overture from the Third Orchestral Set – Keith Clark, Pacific Symphony Orchestra
- AD-72404 Vaughan Williams: Toward the Unknown Region – Norman Del Mar, City of Birmingham Symphony Orchestra and the City of Birmingham Symphony Chorus
- AD-72405 Poulenc: La voix humaine (complete one act opera) – José Serebrier, Adelaide Symphony Orchestra and soloist Carole Farley
- AD-72406 Barber: Capricorn Concerto Op. 21 & Essay for Orchestra No. 1 Op. 12 / Copland: Music for Radio ("Saga of the Prairies" or "Prairie Journal") & An Outdoor Overture – Keith Clark, Pacific Symphony Orchestra
- ACD-85701 Liszt: Symphony No. 2 "Dante" – Varujan Kojian, Utah Symphony Orchestra (Originally released by Varèse Sarabande on CD as VCD-47207)
- ACD-85705 American Composers: Barber: Capricorn Concerto Op. 21 & Essay for Orchestra No. 1 Op. 12 / Copland: Music for Radio ("Saga of the Prairies" or "Prairie Journal") & An Outdoor Overture / Ives: Overture from the Third Orchestral Set – Keith Clark, Pacific Symphony Orchestra (Originally released by Varèse Sarabande on CD as VCD-47211.)
- ACD-85706 The Adventures of Robin Hood – Erich Wolfgang Korngold / Varujan Kojian, the Utah Symphony Orchestra (Originally released by Varèse Sarabande on CD as VCD-47202.)
- ACD-85707 Kings Row – Erich Wolfgang Korngold / Charles Gerhardt, the National Philharmonic Orchestra (Originally released by Varèse Sarabande on CD as VCD-47203.)

== Colossal Records (1989–1992) ==
This offshoot of Varèse Sarabande made scores to vanity titles from television mini-series and obscure films. They appear similar to the regular Varèse Sarabande soundtracks, but with a differently colored logo, lettering, and spine. The titles on this subsidiary were confirmed to be paid for by the label.

One title in this series, Bed and Breakfast, looks like the standard Varèse Sarabande releases due to an error in the number sequence.

- XCD-1001 Tiger Warsaw – Ernest Troost (CD release cancelled)
- XCD-1002 The Film & Stage Music of Bruce Kimmel (The First Nudie Musical / The Creature Wasn't Nice (Spaceship) / Stages / The Good Ones) – Bruce Kimmel
- XCD-1003 Till We Meet Again – Vladimir Cosma
- XCD-1004 The Phantom of the Opera – John Addison
- XCD-1005 A Show of Force – Georges Delerue
- XCD-1006 Eve of Destruction – Philippe Sarde
- XCD-1008 Bed & Breakfast – David Shire ( Catalog number error; Death in Venice was also assigned this number, possibly intended as VSD-5358.)
- XCD-1009 Frozen Assets – Michael Tavera / Billy Martin

== Varèse Signature Series (2017) ==
This series was intended for soundtracks to smaller films and were not a part of the standard catalog releases. The CD's were sold exclusively through the Varèse Sarabande website. This series was cancelled after one release and is no longer active.

VSD-7509 Jasmine – Shie Rozow (Limited to 300 copies)

== Digital Release Series (2003–present) ==
Some Varèse Sarabande titles are exclusive digital releases via various online websites including iTunes, Amazon and Tidal. The first release in 2003 was met with a bad reception due to collectors wanting a physical CD. This happened again with the next release in 2004. A physical CD was released that summer, though with less content.

In later years, the label released titles exclusively as digital, though three of these titles were released as limited edition CDs. A few titles have appeared on Amazon as part of an on demand CDR series. Numbers in this series appear to be random, but may coincide with potential release numbers assigned from the main series' (5200–7500) cancelled releases.

The label's website announces these as digital only releases.

- VSDD-0001 The League of Extraordinary Gentlemen – Trevor Jones
- VSDD-0002 Man on Fire – Harry Gregson-Williams (Features additional music not available on the CD)
- VSDD-5609 Disobedience – Matthew Herbert
- VSDD-5708 Lean on Pete – James Edward Barker
- VSDD-6720 No Place on Earth – John Piscitello
- VSDD-6721 Evidence – Atli Örvarsson
- VSDD-6722 Erased – Jeff Danna (Amazon on demand title)
- VSDD-6761 Open Window – Cliff Eidelman
- VSDD-6928 Torn – Garry Schyman
- VSDD-7161 High Ground – Chris Bacon
- VSDD-7168 Bad Karma – Bryce Jacobs
- VSDD-7214 Imogene (Girl Most Likely) – Rob Simonsen (Amazon on demand title)
- VSDD-7223 The Face of Love – Marcelo Zarvos
- VSDD-7224 +1 – Nathan Larson
- VSDD-7228 A Haunted House 2 – Jesse Voccia / Various Artists
- VSDD-7235 Plush – Nick Launay / Various Artists
- VSDD-7247 Drive Hard – Bryce Jacobs (Amazon on demand title)
- VSDD-7264 Crave – Justin Burnett
- VSDD-7265 Siberia – Corey Wallace
- VSDD-7281 Life of Crime – the Newton Brothers (Shares identical UPC numbers with Decoding Annie Parker.)
- VSDD-7281 Decoding Annie Parker – Steven Bramson (Shares identical UPC numbers with Life of Crime)
- VSDD-7282 Felony – Bryony Marks
- VSDD-7288 Ninjago: Masters of Spinjitzu: Season Two – Jay Vincent & Michael Kramer
- VSDD-7289 Rosemary's Baby – Antoni Komasa-Łazarkiewicz
- VSDD-7310 Hector and the Search for Happiness – Dan Mangan & Jesse Zubot
- VSDD-7313 The Riot Club – Kasper Winding
- VSDD-7326 Tracers – Lucas Vidal
- VSDD-7328 Gloria – Lorne Balfe & Sofía Espinosa
- VSDD-7338 An Introduction – Seymour Bernstein
- VSDD-7344 Jane Got a Gun – Lisa Gerrard & Marcello De Francisci (Announced as a CD, but cancelled)
- VSDD-7347 The Voices – Olivier Bernet
- VSDD-7366 Maggie – David Wingo (Announced as a CD, but cancelled)
- VSDD-7367 Sinister 2 – Tomandandy
- VSDD-7379 American Ultra – Marcelo Zarvos & Paul Hartnoll (Announced as a CD, but cancelled)
- VSDD-7396 Flesh and Bone (ballet music from the Starz original series) – Adam Crystal
- VSDD-7400 Misconduct – Federico Jusid
- VSDD-7435 Tallulah – Michael Brook (Announced as CD with catalog number and cancelled)
- VSDD-7456 A Boy Called Po – Burt Bacharach / Joseph Bauer
- VSDD-7462 The Affair: Season 2 – Marcelo Zarvos
- VSDD-7479 What Happened to Monday – Christian Wibe
- VSDD-7493 Gortimer Gibbon's Life on Normal Street: Season 1 & 2 – Sasha Gordon
- VSDD-7498 Norman – Jun Miyake
- VSDD-7503 Barry – Danny Bensi & Saunder Jurriaans
- VSDD-7506 Random Tropical Paradise – Bryce Jacobs
- VSDD-7509 Jasmine – Shie Rozow (Issued as a limited edition CD for the Signature Series)
- VSDD-7518 68 Kill – Frank Ilfman & James Griffiths
- VSDD-7538 The Man in the High Castle: Season 3 – Dominic Lewis
- VSDD-7540 The Nut Job 2: Nutty by Nature – Heitor Pereira (Issued as a limited edition CD)
- VSDD-7542 Just Getting Started – Alex Wurman
- VSDD-7540 Home Again – John Debney
- VSDD-7549 5 to 7 – Danny Bensi & Saunder Jurriaans
- VSDD-7553 Tiny Christmas – Ryan Shore
- VSDD-7739 Where Hands Touch – Anne Chmelewsky
- VSDD-7561 The Steam Engines of Oz – George Streicher
- VSDD-7581 Replicas – Jose "Pepe" Ojeda & Mark Kilian
- VSDD-7670 The Children Act – Stephen Warbeck
- VSDD-7919 Time Share – Giorgio Giampà
- VSDD-8040 The Devil We Know – Brian Tyler
- VSDD-8065 What They Had – Danny Mulhern
- VSDD-8220 Ben Is Back – Dickon Hinchliffe
- VSDD-8891 The Outpost – James Schafer
- VSDD-8800 The Hole in the Ground – Stephen McKeon
- VSDD-8800 Crypto – Nima Fakhrara
- VSDD-8800 The Prime of Miss Jean Brodie – Rod McKuen
- VSDD-8000 The Borrowers – Rod McKuen
- VSDD-9562 Domino – Pino Donaggio
- VSDD-8645 Vita & Virginia – Isobel Waller-Bridge
- VSDD-8749 Crisis – Raphael Reed
- VSDD-30206115604 Gremlins 2: The New Batch: The Deluxe Edition – Jerry Goldsmith
- VSDD-30206628821 The Omen: The Deluxe Edition – Jerry Goldsmith
- VSDD-888072209824 The Trial Of The Chicago 7 – Daniel Pemberton
- VSDD-888072214125 The Matrix: The Complete Score – Don Davis
- VSDD-888072193840 The Running Man: The Deluxe Edition – Harold Faltermeyer
- VSDD-888072200920 Village Of The Damned: The Deluxe Edition – John Carpenter & Dave Davies
- VSDD-888072223738 How To Train Your Dragon: The Deluxe Edition – John Powell
- VSDD-888072250536 Looney Tunes Back In Action: The Deluxe Edition – Jerry Goldsmith / John Debney & Cameron Patrick (additional music)
- VSDD-888072251540 The Stand: The Deluxe Edition – W.G. Snuffy Walden
- VSDD-888072251878 Air Force One – Jerry Goldsmith & Joel McNeely (additional music)
- VSDD-888072251908 Dreamcatcher: The Deluxe Edition – James Newton Howard
- VSDD-888072225312 Outbreak: The Deluxe Edition – James Newton Howard
- VSDD-888072225329 Dolores Claiborne: The Deluxe Edition – Danny Elfman
- VSDD-888072225336 Star Trek: The Deluxe Edition – Michael Giacchino
- VSDD-888072225343 Volcano: The Deluxe Edition – Alan Silvestri
- VSDD-888072225442 Star Trek Beyond: The Deluxe Edition – Michael Giacchino
- VSDD-888072250468 U.S. Marshals: The Deluxe Edition – Jerry Goldsmith
- VSDD-888072250482 Babe: The Deluxe Edition – Nigel Westlake
- VSDD-888072250499 Wild Wild West: The Deluxe Edition – Elmer Bernstein / Peter Bernstein (additional music)
- VSDD-888072251366 Seaquest DSV: The Deluxe Edition – John Debney
- VSDD-888072225350 Small Soldiers: The Deluxe Edition – Jerry Goldsmith
- VSDD-888072226005 Star Trek Into Darkness: The Deluxe Edition – Michael Giacchino
- VSDD-888072226012 The Haunting: The Deluxe Edition – Jerry Goldsmith
- VSDD-888072285323 The Crow: The Deluxe Edition – Graeme Revell
- VSDD-888072285330 Scream: The Complete Soundtracks Collection – Marco Beltrami
- VSDD-888072400160 Paycheck: The Deluxe Edition – John Powell
- VSDD-888072400566 Knowing: The Deluxe Edition – Marco Beltrami
- VSDD-888072400573 The Cowboys: The Deluxe Edition – John Williams
- VSDD-888072401297 On Deadly Ground: The Deluxe Edition – Basil Poledouris
- VSDD-888072401341 RoboCop 3: The Deluxe Edition – Basil Poledouris
- VSDD-888072401358 Under Siege 2: Dark Territory: The Deluxe Edition – Basil Poledouris
- VSDD-888072418738 Executive Decision: The Deluxe Edition – Jerry Goldsmith
- VSDD-888072423473 Scream (2022) – Brian Tyler
- VSDD-888072439122 The Iron Giant: The Deluxe Edition – Michael Kamen
- VSDD-888072461437 The Bourne Identity: The Tumescent Edition – John Powell
- VSDD-888072483910 Rudy: The Deluxe Edition – Jerry Goldsmith
- VSDD-888072484023 Lara Croft Tomb Raider: The Cradle of Life: The Deluxe Edition – Alan Silvestri
- VSDD-888072501225 Mimic: The Deluxe Edition – Marco Beltrami
- VSDD-888072501249 L.A. Confidential: The Deluxe Edition – Jerry Goldsmith

== Varèse Sarabande Vinyl (special editions and releases / reissues) (2013–present) ==
The label made a return to vinyl and reissued of some of their older albums on CD. Many were special limited editions in colored or unique vinyl. Many of these LPs were available through stores such as Barnes & Noble, Mondo and Fire Records as exclusives to promote Record Store Day. Others are exclusive to the Varèse Sarabande website.

- VSD 030206109535 The Right Stuff – Bill Conti (Limited edition of 750 copies)
- VSD 030206114355 Nemesis – Jerry Goldsmith (Website exclusive; limited edition of 750 copies)
- VSD 030206320015 Original Motion Picture Soundtrack (10 inch vinyl WWII "V-Disc") – Steven Price (Record Store Day 2015 exclusive. Limited edition of 1000 copies.)
- VSD 030206526851 Forbidden Zone – Danny Elfman / Oingo Boingo
- VSD 030206528152 The Omen – Jerry Goldsmith (Limited edition of 666 hand-numbered copies)
- VSD 030206530801 Unforgiven (25th Anniversary Edition) – Lennie Niehaus / Clint Eastwood (Barnes & Noble exclusive. Limited to 1000 copies)
- VSD 030206544633 Rudy (shamrock green vinyl) – Jerry Goldsmith (CCVinyl.com exclusive. Limited edition of 800)
- VSD 030206544633 Rudy (Irish gold vinyl) – Jerry Goldsmith (Varèse exclusive edition. Limited edition of 800 copies)
- VSD 030206549911 Original Motion Picture Score (180 gram) – Graeme Revell
- VSD 030206654219 Chitty Chitty Bang Bang – Richard M. Sherman, Robert B. Sherman & Irwin Kostal
- VSD 030206602630 Original Motion Picture Score – Don Davis (Newbury Comics exclusive. Limited edition of 500 to 1000 copies)
- VSD 030206602654 The Matrix (red pill / blue pill colour vinyl) – Don Davis (Amazon.com exclusive. Limited edition of 1500 copies)
- VSD 030206606256 The Iron Giant – Michael Kamen (Books-A-Million and 2nd & Charles USA exclusives. Limited edition of 1000 copies)
- VSD 030206606610 Dark Shadows – Bob Cobert
- VSD 030206606119 The Sixth Sense – James Newton Howard (Limited edition of 500 hand-numbered copies)
- VSD 030206628616 Ghosts of Mars – John Carpenter
- VSD 030206635836 Ice Age (picture disc vinyl) – David Newman
- VSD 030206636734 The Bourne Identity – John Powell (Limited edition of 1000 copies)
- VSD 030206691917 The Girl from U.N.C.L.E. – Jerry Goldsmith / Dave Grusin / Richard Shores / Teddy Randazzo (Record Store Day release 2013. Limited edition of 1000 copies)
- VSD 030206709711 Game of Thrones – Ramin Djawadi
- VSD 030206719314 Pain & Gain – Steve Jablonsky
- VSD 030206719710 Stuck in Love – Mike Mogis & Nate Walcott
- VSD 030206719819 Star Trek Into Darkness – Michael Giacchino
- VSD 030206722710 Ender's Game – Steve Jablonsky
- VSD 030206729856 Penny Dreadful – Abel Korzeniowski
- VSD 030206730951 John Wick – Tyler Bates & Joel J. Richard / Various Artists
- VSD 030206732214 Orphan Black – Various Artists
- VSD 030206738018 Carol (Double 10" album) – Carter Burwell / Various Artists
- VSD 030206739015 The Mad Max Trilogy (Mad Max / The Road Warrior / Mad Max Beyond Thunderdome) – Brian May / Maurice Jarre, Tina Turner (Limited edition of 2000 copies)
- VSD 030206739251 The Star Wars Trilogy (translucent blue, red, and green vinyl) – John Williams / Varujan Kojian conductor (Newbury Comics exclusive. Limited edition of 1000 copies)
- VSD 030206739718 Star Trek Beyond – Michael Giacchino
- VSD 030206741117 Nighthawks – Keith Emerson (Limited edition of 1000 copies)
- VSD 030206743012 Popeye – Harry Nilsson / Various Artists (Record Store Day Black Friday 2016 release. Limited edition of 2000 copies)
- VSD 030206743616 Barbarella – Bob Crewe & Charles Fox
- VSD 030206742510 Roots (30th Anniversary Edition) – Quincy Jones (Limited edition of 1000 copies)
- VSD 030206745917 Wheeler – Wheeler Bryson
- VSD 030206748956 Silent Running – Peter Schickele
- VSD 030206748413 Power Rangers (black vinyl) – Brian Tyler
- VSD 030206748437 Power Rangers (Red Ranger vinyl variant) – Brian Tyler (FYE exclusive. Limited to 500 copies)
- VSD 030206748444 Power Rangers (Blue Ranger vinyl variant) – Brian Tyler (Indie exclusive. Limited to 500 copies)
- VSD 030206748451 Power Rangers (Pink Ranger vinyl variant)) – Brian Tyler (Hot Topic exclusive. Limited to 500 copies)
- VSD 030206748468 Power Rangers (Yellow Ranger vinyl variant) – Brian Tyler (Barnes & Noble exclusive. Limited to 500 copies)
- VSD 030206749113 Leonard Nimoy Presents Mr. Spock's Music from Outer Space – Leonard Nimoy / Various Artists
- VSD 030206750010 Christine (blue vinyl) – John Carpenter in association with Alan Howarth
- VSD 030206750034 Christine (red vinyl) – John Carpenter in association with Alan Howarth
- VSD 030206751215 Charlotte's Web – Richard M. Sherman & Robert B. Sherman
- VSD 030206751550 The Bad News Bears – Jerry Fielding (Limited edition of 1000 copies)
- VSD 030206753158 Mad Max – Brian May (Exclusive to Newbury Comics. Limited edition of 750 copies)
- VSD 030206753510 Tooth and Tail – Austin Wintory
- VSD 030206753615 Three Billboards Outside Ebbing, Missouri – Carter Burwell / Various Artists
- VSD 030206754858 Road House – Jeff Healey Band / Various Artists (Barnes & Noble exclusive edition. Limited to 1000 copies)
- VSD 030206755411 Fletch – Harold Faltermeyer / Various Artists
- VSD 030206755619 Knight Rider – Stu Phillips (Two LP Record Store Day 2019 exclusive. Limited to 2000 copies)
- VSD 030206757415 V For Vendetta – Dario Marianelli / Various Artists
- VSD 030206757859 Pee-wee's Big Adventure / Back to School – Danny Elfman / John Coleman, conductor
- VSD 030206758412 Sicario: Day of the Soldado – Hildur Guðnadóttir
- VSD 030206829210 Blue Velvet – Angelo Badalamenti / Various Artists
- VSD 030206666359 Stripes – Elmer Bernstein (CCVinyl.com exclusive. Limited to 1000 copies)
- VSD 030206668216 Serenity – David Newman (Barnes & Noble exclusive. Limited to 1500 copies)
- VSD 030206669916 Firefly – Greg Edmonson (Barnes & Noble exclusive. Limited to 1800 copies)
- VSD 030206701210 How to Train Your Dragon – John Powell (Record Store Day 2016 release. Limited to 2000 copies)
- VSD 030206709513 The Family Way – Paul McCartney (2015 Record Store Day exclusive release)
- VSD 030206714814 Game of Thrones: Season 2 – Ramin Djawadi
- VSD 030206728613 Whiplash – Justin Hurwitz / Various Artists (Released for Record Store Day 2015)
- VSD 030206728613 Whiplash (clear vinyl) – Justin Hurwitz / Various Artists (Newbury Comics exclusive. Limited to 500 copies)
- VSD 030206728613 Whiplash (red vinyl) – Justin Hurwitz / Various Artists (CCVinyl.com exclusive. Limited to 1000 copies)
- VSD 030206731415 Orange Is the New Black – Gwendolyn Sanford, Brandon Jay, Scott Doherty
- VSD 030206731415 Orange Is the New Black (orange vinyl) – Gwendolyn Sanford, Brandon Jay, Scott Doherty (Record Store Day 2015 release. Limited to 2200 copies)
- VSD 030206731514 Keep On Keepin' On – Dave Grusin / Clark Terry / Quincy Jones
- VSD 030206736915 Sicario – Jóhann Jóhannsson
- VSD 030206739213 The Star Wars Trilogy (standard vinyl) – John Williams / Varujan Kojian conductor
- VSD 888072101487 The Fly (1986) – Howard Shore
- VSD 888072101500 Scream/Scream 2 – Marco Beltrami
- VSD 888072105874 Heathers (30th Anniversary) – David Newman
- VSD 888072029248 Shaft (1971) (180 g vinyl) – Isaac Hayes
- VSD 888072063006 Varèse Sarabande: 40 Years of Great Film Music 1978–2018 – Various Artists
- VSD 888072069671 The Zombies: Complete Studio Recordings – the Zombies
- VSD 888072070103 L.A. Confidential – Jerry Goldsmith
- VSD 888072073760 Fritz the Cat (picture disc) – Ed Bogas & Ray Shanklin / Various Artists (Record Store Day Black Friday 2018 – Limited to 2500 copies)
- VSD 888072073869 Vertigo (60th anniversary vinyl) – Bernard Herrmann
- VSD 888072077584 Krypton – Pinar Toprak (Record Store Day 2019 exclusive. Limited edition of 1350 copies)
- VSD 888072080294 The Last of the Mohicans (re-recording) – Trevor Jones / Randy Edelman, Joel McNeely, conductor (Barnes & Noble exclusive)
- VSD 888072082144 I Know What You Did Last Summer – Various Artists ( Record Store Day 2019 release. Limited to 1350 copies)
- VSD 888072088382 Star Trek – Michael Giacchino (Record Store Day 2019 release. Limited to 2000 copies)
- VSD 888072089860 The Goonies – Dave Grusin ( Limited to 750 hand-numbered copies exclusive to the Varèse Sarabande website)
- VSD 888072089013 Gremlins 2: The New Batch – Jerry Goldsmith (limited to 750 copies. Varèse Club exclusive)
- VSD 888072086067 Farscape: 20th Anniversary Edition – Guy Gross / Subvision
- VSD 888072086876 Carlito's Way – Patrick Doyle (Barnes & Noble exclusive, limited to 1000 copies)
- VSD 888072092051 How to Train Your Dragon (picture disc vinyl) – John Powell
- VSD 888072105874 Vince Guaraldi – It's The Great Pumpkin, Charlie Brown – Vince Guaraldi
- VSD 888072100060 Blade – Mark Isham
- VSD 888072122918 John Wick – Tyler Bates & Joel J. Richard / Various Artists
- VSD 888072122987 John Wick: Chapter 2 – Tyler Bates & Joel J. Richard / Various Artists
- VSD 888072122949 John Wick: Chapter 3 – Parabellum – Tyler Bates & Joel J. Richard / Various Artists
- VSD 888072113664 Jim Henson's Emmet Otter's Jug-Band Christmas – Paul Williams (Released in Canada as Black Friday 2019 release. Limited edition of 2500 copies)
- VSD 888072149618 The Dark Crystal: Age of Resistance: Volumes 1 & 2 – Daniel Pemberton / Samuel Sim
- VSD 888072157835 The Buddy Holly Story: Deluxe Edition – Various Artists
- VSD 888072172975 Star Wars: Shadows of the Empire – Joel McNeely / John Williams ("Star Wars Theme")
- VSD 888072173002 The Holiday – Hans Zimmer
- VSD 888072173040 Xena Warrior Princess: Lyre, Lyre, Hearts On Fire (picture disc vinyl) – Joseph LoDuca / Various Artists
- VSD 888072181400 The Running Man: Deluxe Edition – Harold Faltermeyer
- VSD 888072195509 Game of Thrones (White Walker vinyl) – Ramin Djawadi (limited edition released in Europe)
- VSD 888072204898 Elf (picture disc) – John Debney (Walmart exclusive)
- VSD 888072227279 The Trial of the Chicago 7 – Daniel Pemberton
- VSD 888072240445 The Empire Strikes Back – John Williams / Charles Gerhardt cond.
- VSD 888072369948 Amadeus: Deluxe Vinyl Box Set – Various Artists
- VSD 888072234550 The Sound Of Music – Julie Andrews / Various (LP reissue)
- VSD 888072369962 J.R.R. Tolkien's The Lord of the Rings: Deluxe Vinyl Box Set – Leonard Rosenman
- VSD 888072265783 The Crow: The Deluxe Edition – Graeme Revell
- VSD 888072266926 Scream: Original Motion Picture Soundtracks – Marco Beltrami
- VSD 888072414006 The Bourne Identity – John Powell (LP issue of the 2002 soundtrack)
- VSD 888072419001 The Iron Giant: The Deluxe Edition – Michael Kamen
- VSD 888072417915 Scream (2022)- Brian Tyler (clear red and smoke vinyl) (Limited to 300 copies; Varèse Sarabande website exclusive)
- VSD 888072417922 Scream (2022) – Brian Tyler (Standard edition)
- VSD 888072409385 The Matrix: The Complete Edition – Don Davis
- VSD 888072426429 The Omen – Jerry Goldsmith
- VSD 888072428041 Firestarter – Tangerine Dream (Limited to 1500 Copies; Varèse Sarabande website exclusive)
- VSD 888072448025 The Iron Giant: The Deluxe Edition – Michael Kamen (This Green Vinyl version is sold exclusively through the Varèse site)
- VSD 888072540187 Little Richard: I Am Everything – Little Richard
- VSD 888072532410 Murder By Death – Dave Grusin
- VSD 00065 Mortal Kombat (25th Anniversary) – George S. Clinton (Record Store Day exclusive release September 26, 2020, limited edition of 1500 copies)
- VSD 00199 The Matrix (picture disc vinyl) – Don Davis
- VSD 00206 Hackers (25th Anniversary) – Simon Boswell / Various Artists (Record Store Day exclusive release September 26, 2020, limited edition of 2500 copies)
- VSD 00354 Mission Impossible 3 – Michael Giacchino (Limited Editio)
- VSD 00388 Blue Velvet – Angelo Badalamenti (Record Store Day)
- VSD 00407 Scream Soundtracks (1-4 Collection) – Marco Beltrami (Box set; Available through the Varèse Sarabande website)
- VSD 00463 The Cowboys – John Williams (Limited Edition 2 LP Gold Vinyl)
- VSD 00466 Mimic – Marco Beltrami (Record Store Day, Limited Edition Green Vinyl)
- VSD 00470 The Matrix: The Complete Edition – Don Davis (Limited Edition 3 LP set)
- VSD 00474 Big Night – Various Artists (Record Store Day, Limited Edition Clear Vinyl)
- VSD 00492 The Iron Giant – Michael Kamen (Limited Edition 2 LP Vinyl set)
- VSD 00502 Death Becomes Her: The Deluxe Edition – Alan Silvestri (Record Store Day Limited Edition, Purple Vinyl. Available through the Varèse Sarabande website)
- VSD 00507 Firestarter – Tangerine Dream (Limited Edition Fuego colored vinyl)
- VSD 00514 Blood Simple: The Deluxe Edition – Carter Burwell (Record Store Day, Limited Edition Red with Black Smoke [Killer Crimson] Vinyl. Only available through the Varèse Sarabande website)
- VSD 00541 Three O'Clock High – Tangerine Dream / Sylvester Levay / Jim Walker (Limited Edition Blue Vinyl. Only Available through the Varèse Sarabande website)
- VSD 00548 How To Train Your Dragon 2 – John Powell (Record Store Day, Limited Edition 2 LP, Red Translucent With Multicolor Splatter Vinyl)
- VSD 00666 Lost Season One – Michael Giacchino
- VSD 00669 Lost Season One – Michael Giacchino (2 LP Limited Edition Blue Translucent w/ Black And Blue Smoke Vinyl [Oceanic Black Smoke Marble] Only Available through the Varèse Sarabande website)
- VSD 00672 Murder By Death – Dave Grusin (Limited Edition – Clear LP. Only Available through the Varèse Sarabande website)
- VSD 00689 Scream 6 – Brian Tyler & Sven Falconer (Limited Edition 2 LP Set. Green Marble [Stab Green] Only Available through the Varèse Sarabande website)
- VSD 030206729856 Penny Dreadful – Abel Korzeniowski
- VSD 00000 The Matrix (glitter-infused green vinyl) – Don Davis (Record Store Day exclusive)
- VSD 00000 The Goonies (35th Anniversary) (picture disc vinyl) – Dave Grusin (Record Store Day exclusive June 12, 2021)
- VSD 00000 Village of the Damned: Deluxe Edition (orange haze vinyl) – John Carpenter & Dave Davies (Record Store Day exclusive June 12, 2021.)
- VSD 00000 Shrek (20th Anniversary) (green vinyl) – Harry Gregson-Williams & John Powell (Record Store Day exclusive June 12, 2021. Limited to 1000 copies)
- VSD 00000 The Iron Giant (picture disc vinyl) – Michael Kamen (Record Store Day exclusive July 17, 2021)
- VSD 00000 Ghosts of Mars (20th Anniversary)– John Carpenter (Record Store Day exclusive July 17, 2021. Limited to 1000 copies)
- VSD 00000 Aliens: 35th Anniversary – James Horner (Record Store Day exclusive July 17, 2021. Limited to 1000 copies)
- VSD 00000 Death Becomes Her: The Deluxe Edition – Alan Silvestri (purple vinyl) ( Black Friday Record Store Day release for November 2022)
- VSD 00000 Mimic – Marco Beltrami (green vinyl) (This is a Black Friday Record Store Day release for November 2022)
- VSD 00000 The Cowboys: The Deluxe Edition – John Williams (gold vinyl) (Black Friday Record Store Day release for November 2022)
- VSD 00000 Three O'Clock High – Tangerine Dream / Sylvester Levay (Additional Music) (Standard Black Vinyl)
- VSD 00000 Three O'Clock High – Tangerine Dream / Sylvester Levay (Additional Music) (Limited Edition Blue Vinyl Edition)
- MOND-035 The Iron Giant – Michael Kamen
- MOND-125 Speed Racer (white with red racing stripe vinyl) – Michael Giacchino (. Limited to 1000 copies)
- FROST003LP Blue Velvet (blue & blue split vinyl) – Angelo Badalamenti / Various Artists (Limited edition release through Fire Records)

== Varèse Sarabande Vinyl Club (2023–present) ==
This Vinyl Club is a spinoff of the original Varèse CD Club featuring special edition soundtracks in the vinyl format. These titles will only be available through the Varèse Sarabande website with no membership required.

- VSVCLP01 – Starship Troopers – Basil Poledouris (Standard Black 2 LP Vinyl Edition)
- VSVCLP01 – Starship Troopers – Basil Poledouris (Blood and Bug Juice Vinyl – Limited Edition 2 LP Vinyl)

== The Cancelled Albums (1987–present) ==
Varèse has a number of cancelled albums. Some were announced, but released by a different label.

Many albums have "phantom" numbers, meaning that they were assigned catalogue numbers before cancellation. Many of these are listed in the CD catalog throughout the 47000, 704, 5200, and 6000, the Varèse Sarabande Club, and Masters Film Music series. Many were announced at publications such as Film Score Monthly and the Muze music database.

Some reasons for cancellation include publishing and copyright conflicts, uncooperative studios and production companies, lost orchestral sketches, and lost or damaged recording tapes. Entries within the catalog are listed with their official number. Entries not assigned an official number are labeled as VSDC-0000 (Varèse Sarabande disc cancellation) and year of announcement (1998, 2000, etc.)

- SRS 2010 Lilies of the Field – Jerry Goldsmith (Later reissued by Perseverance Records)
- SRS 2012 Heartbeeps – John Williams (Later released through the CD club)
- XCD-1001 Tiger Warsaw – Ernest Troost (CD release cancelled)
- VCD-47299 The Penitent – Alex North
- VCD-70452 Two Moon Junction – Jonathan Elias (CD release cancelled. Later released in 1994 as VSD-5518)
- VCD-70453 Lady In White – Frank LaLoggia (CD release cancelled. Later released in 1997 by East West Records and in 2018 by Intrada Records)
- VCD-70456 Bad Dreams – Jay Ferguson (Later released as part of Varèse Sarabande's LP-to-CD Subscription Series)
- VCD-70457 Dead Heat – Ernest Troost (CD release cancelled)
- VCD-704?? "Predator / Die Hard" – Alan Silvestri / Michael Kamen (Later released individually through the CD Club in 2002 (Die Hard) and 2003 (Predator) )
- VCDM-704.440 Pass The Ammo – Carter Burwell
- VSD-5336 Dutch – Alan Silvestri / Various Artists (Silvestri's score would be released by La-La Land Records in 2010.)
- VSD-5362 Rock-a-Doodle – Robert Folk / T.J. Kuenster (Released in Germany by the Good Music Label and later by Quartet Records)
- VSD-5387 Whispers in the Dark – Thomas Newman (Later released by Intrada Records in 2012)
- VSD-5458 The Good Son – Elmer Bernstein (Later released by Fox Movie Scores)
- VSD-5474 Mother's Boys – George S. Clinton
- VSD-5650 Lost Civilizations – Joe Delia (Released as an agency promotional CD for the composer)
- VSD-5745 Alaska – Reg Powell
- VSD-6016 Analyze This – Howard Shore / Various Artists
- VSD-6126 Wonder Boys – Christopher Young (A promo was released for Oscar consideration)
- VSD-6203 Legend: The Deluxe Edition – Jerry Goldsmith (Reissued by Silva Screen Records in 2002 and Music Box Records in 2021.)
- VSD-6320 Jimmy Neutron: Boy Genius – John Debney
- VSD-6352 Dinotopia – Trevor Jones (Released on CMP Records)
- VSD-6751 Idlewild – John Debney (FYC promo exists)
- VSD-6822 Lucky You – Christopher Young (Composer promo released soon after)
- VSD-6858 30 Days of Night – Brian Reitzell (Released by Ipac Recordings in 2007)
- VSD-6935 Righteous Kill – Edward Shearmur
- VSD-7001 It's Complicated – Hans Zimmer & Heitor Pereira (Released digitally through Back Lot Music)
- VSD-7035 The Special Relationship – Alexandre Desplat (Released as part of the Limited Edition series in 2010)
- VSD-7161 High Ground – Chris Bacon (Digital release only)
- VSD-7208 No Place on Earth – John Piscitello (Digital release only)
- VSD-7323 The Newsroom – Thomas Newman / John Beal
- VSD-7344 Jane Got a Gun – Lisa Gerrard / Marcello De Francisci
- VSD-7360 Maggie – David Wingo (Digital release only)
- VSDC-1986 King Kong Lives – John Scott, the Graunke Symphony Orchestra (Originally a 47000 title. It was sold to MCA Records in 1986. Has the LP catalog number of STV 81302.)
- VSDC-1997 The Relic – John Debney (Originally planned as a 5700 title for a 1996 release, but Paramount Pictures delayed the film)
- VSDC-1997/1998 The Great Escape – Elmer Bernstein (re-recording) the Royal Scottish National Orchestra (Later sold to RCA/Victor and released in 1999)
- VSDC-1997/1998 The Magnificent Seven – Elmer Bernstein (re-recording) the Royal Scottish National Orchestra (Later sold to RCA/Victor and released in 1999)
- VSDC-1998 The Die Hard Trilogy – Michael Kamen, the Royal Scottish National Orchestra
- VSDC-1998 Franz Waxman: Legends of Hollywood: Volume Five – Franz Waxman, Richard Mills conductor. Queensland Orchestra
- VSDC-1999 Bernard Herrmann at 20th Century Fox – Bernard Herrmann (Originally planned as a two-disc set, it was eventually sold as separate individual three-disc volumes in 1999. The label released a 14-disc limited edition box set through the Varèse Club in 2011)
- VSDC-1999 Jerry Goldsmith at 20th Century Fox – Jerry Goldsmith (Released as a limited edition box set through the Varèse Club in 2004)
- VSDC-1998 Godzilla – Akira Ifukube, the Royal Scottish National Orchestra
- VSDC-2000 Highlander – Michael Kamen, the Royal Scottish National Orchestra
- VSDC-2001 Antitrust – Don Davis (An agency promo of the score for the composer exists)
- VSDC-2001 3000 Miles To Graceland – George S. Clinton (A promo of the score for the composer exists)
