= Predator (franchise) =

American media franchise

- Official franchise logo
- Created by: Jim Thomas; John Thomas
- Original work: Predator (1987)
- Owner: 20th Century Studios
- Years: 1987–present

Print publications
- Novels: List of novels
- Comics: List of comics

Films and television
- Films: Original series; Predator (1987); Predator 2 (1990); Predators (2010); The Predator (2018); Predator: Badlands (2025); Prequel; Prey (2022); Animated film; Predator: Killer of Killers (2025); Crossover series; Alien vs. Predator (2004); Aliens vs. Predator: Requiem (2007)
- Short films: The Chosen (2010); Moments of Extraction (2010); Crucified (2010); Predator vs. Colonial Marines (2016); The Predator Holiday Special (2018)

Games
- Video games: List of video games

Audio
- Soundtracks: Predator (1987); Predator 2 (1990); Alien vs. Predator (2004); Aliens vs. Predator: Requiem (2007); Predators (2010); The Predator (2018); Prey (2022); Predator: Killer of Killers (2025); Predator: Badlands (2025)

Miscellaneous
- Character(s): List of characters

Predator is an American science fiction action horror anthology media franchise primarily centered on encounters between humans and a fictional species of extraterrestrial trophy hunters known as the Predators. Produced and distributed by 20th Century Studios, the series was initially conceived by screenwriters Jim and John Thomas. The series began with the film Predator (1987), directed by John McTiernan, and was followed by sequels Predator 2 (1990), Predators (2010), The Predator (2018), which was set between the second and third films, and Predator: Badlands (2025), and prequels Prey (2022) and Predator: Killer of Killers (2025), as well as a range of expanded universe media, like comic books, novels, and video games, including Predator: Concrete Jungle (2005) and Predator: Hunting Grounds (2020).

Beginning with crossover comic books published in the 1990s under the Alien vs. Predator (AVP) imprint, the Predators later intersected with the Alien franchise, pitting the Predators against the titular Alien characters. This narrative convergence led to two theatrical crossover films—Alien vs. Predator (2004) and Aliens vs. Predator: Requiem (2007)—and the AVP series having its own associated expanded universe of tie-in novels, comics and video games.

== Premise ==
The Predator franchise centers on recurring storylines in which human characters encounter a technologically advanced extraterrestrial species that hunts other lifeforms for sport. These extraterrestrials—credited as Predators in the films and alternatively named Yautja, Hish-Qu-Ten, and Skin Thieves in expanded universe media—serve as antagonists in largely self-contained narratives that blend military science fiction, action, and horror elements.

Although the films vary in setting, they typically follow a familiar structure: a group of humans, often military personnel or other combatants, find themselves targeted by a Predator during a mission or survival scenario. The creatures are portrayed as adhering to a ritualized code of conduct, selectively targeting dangerous opponents they deem worthy prey. Over time, expanded media introduced additional layers to the fictional mythology, including the species' social hierarchy, interstellar hunting culture, and internal rivalries.

== Background ==
Predator was John McTiernan's first studio film as director. The studio hired screenplay writer Shane Black not only to play a supporting role in the film, but to keep an eye on McTiernan due to the director's inexperience. Jean-Claude Van Damme was originally cast as the film's creature, the idea being that the physical action star would use his martial arts skills to make the creature an agile, ninja-like hunter. When compared to Arnold Schwarzenegger, Carl Weathers, and Jesse Ventura, actors known for their bodybuilding regimes, it became apparent a more physically imposing man was needed to make the creature appear threatening. Van Damme was eventually removed from the film and replaced by the actor and mime artist Kevin Peter Hall. A Van Damme easter egg was eventually featured in The Predator.

The Yautja's design is credited to special effects artist Stan Winston. While flying to Japan with Aliens director James Cameron, Winston, who had been hired to design the Predator, was doing concept art on the flight. Cameron noticed what he was drawing and stated: "I always wanted to see something with mandibles", and Winston subsequently included them in his designs. Schwarzenegger recommended Winston after his experience working on The Terminator.

The film's creature was originally designed with a long neck, a dog-like head and a single eye. This design was abandoned when it became apparent that the jungle locations would make shooting the complex design too difficult. The studio originally contracted the makeup effects for the creature from Richard Edlund's Boss Film Creature Shop. However, with problems filming the creature in Mexico and attempts to create a convincing monster of Van Damme, wearing a very different body suit, failing, makeup effects responsibilities were given to Winston and his studio, R/Greenberg Associates. According to former Boss Film Creature Shop makeup supervisor Steve Johnson, the makeup failed because of an impractical design by McTiernan that included 12-inch-length (300 mm) extensions which gave the creature a backward bent satyr leg. The design did not work in the jungle locations. After six weeks of shooting in the jungles of Palenque, Mexico, the production had to shut down so that Winston could make the new creature. This took eight months and then filming resumed for five weeks.

The clicking sound of the creature was provided by Peter Cullen. Despite his resolution not to voice any more monsters following injuries to his throat sustained during the ADR of King Kong, his agent convinced him to audition. The clicking sound was inspired by a mixture of the visual of the creature and his recollection of a dying horseshoe crab.

R/Greenberg Associates created the film's optical effects, including the creature's ability to become invisible, its thermal vision point of view, its glowing blood, and the electric spark effects. The invisibility effect was achieved by having someone in a bright red suit (because it was the furthest opposite of the green of the jungle and the blue of the sky) the size of the creature. The take was then repeated without the actors using a 30% wider lens on the camera. When the two takes were combined optically, an outline of the alien could be seen with the background scenery bending around its shape. For the thermal vision, infrared film could not be used because it did not register in the range of body temperature wavelengths. The glowing blood was achieved by green liquid from chem-lite sticks used by campers. The electrical sparks were rotoscoped animation using white paper pin registered on portable light tables to black-and-white prints of the film frames. The drawings were composited by the optical crew for the finished effects.

In an interview on Predator Special Edition, actor Carl Weathers said many of the actors would secretly wake up as early as 3 a.m. to exercise before the day's shooting, in order to look "pumped" during the scene. Weathers also stated that he would act as if his physique was naturally given to him, and would exercise only after all the other actors were nowhere to be seen. It was reported that actor Sonny Landham was so unstable on the set that a bodyguard was hired to protect other people from him.

According to Schwarzenegger, filming was physically demanding as he had to swim in very cold water and spent three weeks covered in mud for the climactic battle with the creature. In addition, cast and crew endured freezing temperatures in the Mexican jungle that required heat lamps to be on all of the time. Schwarzenegger also faced the challenge of working with Kevin Peter Hall who could not see out of the mask, and had to rehearse his scenes with it off and then memorize where everything was.

The film was particularly successful and subsequently inspired a number of comic books, video games and popular anecdotes within the media. Schwarzenegger was asked to reprise his role in a Predator sequel, but was attached to Terminator 2: Judgment Day and could not accept the role. The character was rewritten from the developing sequel's script, and the sequel to Predator, directed by Stephen Hopkins, was scheduled for 1990.

Due to excessive violence and nudity scenes, Predator 2 was the first film to be given the newly instituted NC-17 rating in the United States. It was eventually rated R by the Motion Picture Association of America after being re-cut to its final theatrical length. The film cast Danny Glover in the lead role, and Kevin Peter Hall reprised his role as the Predator. Also, returning to the role of Anna in the sequel, Elpidia Carrillo was slated to be in two scenes but was cut back to a brief appearance on a video screen in the government agents' surveillance trailer. Her character is showing damage to the Central American jungle caused by the explosion at the conclusion of the first film.

== Films ==
| Film | US release date | Director(s) | Screenwriter(s) | Story by | Producer(s) |
Main films
| Predator | June 12, 1987 | John McTiernan | Jim Thomas and John Thomas | Jim Thomas and John Thomas | Lawrence Gordon, Joel Silver and John Davis |
| Predator 2 | November 21, 1990 | Stephen Hopkins | Jim Thomas and John Thomas | Jim Thomas and John Thomas | Lawrence Gordon, Joel Silver and John Davis |
| Predators | July 9, 2010 | Nimród Antal | Alex Litvak and Michael Finch | Alex Litvak and Michael Finch | John Davis, Robert Rodriguez and Elizabeth Avellán |
| The Predator | September 14, 2018 | Shane Black | Fred Dekker and Shane Black | Fred Dekker and Shane Black | John Davis |
| Prey | August 5, 2022 | Dan Trachtenberg | Patrick Aison | Patrick Aison and Dan Trachtenberg | John Davis, Jhane Myers and Marty P. Ewing |
| Predator: Killer of Killers | June 6, 2025 | Dan Trachtenberg | Micho Robert Rutare | Dan Trachtenberg and Micho Robert Rutare | John Davis, Dan Trachtenberg, Marc Toberoff and Ben Rosenblatt |
| Predator: Badlands | November 7, 2025 | Dan Trachtenberg | Patrick Aison | Patrick Aison and Dan Trachtenberg | John Davis, Dan Trachtenberg, Marc Toberoff, Ben Rosenblatt and Brent O'Connor |
Crossover series
| Alien vs. Predator | August 13, 2004 | Paul W. S. Anderson | Paul W. S. Anderson | Paul W. S. Anderson, Dan O'Bannon & Ronald Shusett | John Davis, Gordon Carroll, David Giler & Walter Hill |
| Aliens vs. Predator: Requiem | December 25, 2007 | Greg and Colin Strause | Shane Salerno | Shane Salerno | John Davis, David Giler & Walter Hill |

Predator story chronology
- 841 — Predator: Killer of Killers (The Shield) (2025)
- 1609 — Predator: Killer of Killers (The Sword) (2025)
- 1719 — Prey (2022)
- 1942 — Predator: Killer of Killers (The Bullet) (2025)
- 1987 — Predator (1987)
- 1997 — Predator 2 (1990)
- 2018 — The Predator (2018)
- 2??? — Predators (2010)
- 2??? — Predator: Badlands (2025)

=== Main films ===
==== Predator (1987) ====
An elite paramilitary rescue team, led by Major Dutch, is on a covert operation in a Central American jungle where they are tasked with rescuing an official and his assistant from guerrillas when they encounter a highly dangerous extraterrestrial with futuristic technology that hunts them for sport and are forced to find a way to defeat it before it kills off the entire team while awaiting a helicopter rescue.

==== Predator 2 (1990) ====
In the record-hot summer of 1997, a different Predator arrives in Los Angeles and hunts violent gang members, drawing the attention of the local police force, specifically Lieutenant Harrigan, who pursues the creature as it rampages throughout the city. The creature itself is in turn being hunted by the secretive government task-force OWLF, led by CIA agent Peter Keyes, which wishes to capture it for study.

==== Predators (2010) ====
A group of notorious mercenaries and murderers find themselves kidnapped and transported to an extraterrestrial game preserve jungle planet, where they have to learn to work together in order to fight a band of Super Predators and other creatures stalking them and find a way off this world.

==== The Predator (2018) ====
After witnessing the crash of a Predator spaceship on Earth and hiding some of the remains, US Army Ranger Quinn McKenna and a team of PTSD-afflicted soldiers must take down a pair of Predators, including a new Predator which was genetically enhanced by its species. The Predator canon is expanded by distinguishing multiple types and purposes of the Predator species.

==== Prey (2022) ====
Naru, a skilled Comanche warrior, is striving to prove herself as a hunter, and finds herself having to protect her people from a Predator as well as from French fur traders who are destroying the Buffalo her people rely on for survival. Through multiple close encounters, she gains enough knowledge about the Predator and kills it alone, finally proving herself to her tribe.

==== Predator: Killer of Killers (2025) ====
An anthology showing the Yautja hunting humans in different time eras.

==== Predator: Badlands (2025) ====
Dek is a Yautja runt from Yautja Prime, who seeks approval from his father, clan leader Njohrr. He vows to hunt the Kalisk, a seemingly unkillable apex predator on the "death planet" Genna. Upon crash-landing on Genna, Dek faces numerous environmental dangers from both flora and fauna. He reluctantly allies with Thia, a damaged Weyland-Yutani Corporation android, whose team was destroyed while attempting to capture the Kalisk.

=== Crossover series ===
Inspired by the Dark Horse Comics series, the filmmakers of Predator 2 (1990) incorporated an easter egg in which an Alien skull was seen in a Predator trophy case. Expansions upon this shared universe between the Alien and Predator franchises followed through comics and video games, leading up to the launch of a film franchise with the release of Alien vs. Predator in 2004, followed by Aliens vs. Predator: Requiem in 2007. The franchise has spawned various comics, novels, video games, and other merchandise based upon or inspired by the films. A third film has been variously rumored since the production of Requiem. In mid-2018, Shane Black, the director of The Predator, expressed his belief that a third Alien vs. Predator could still happen, indicating the studio's interest in both franchises.

In August 2024, Fede Álvarez, the director of Alien: Romulus, also said he was open to directing a third Alien vs. Predator film, proposing to Melanie Brooks and Anthony D'Alessandro of Deadline Hollywood that he would enjoy directing it along with Dan Trachtenberg, the director of the Predator films Prey (2022) and Predator: Badlands (2025): "Maybe it's something I have to co-direct with my buddy Dan. Maybe we should do like [Quentin] Tarantino and Robert Rodriguez did with [From] Dusk till Dawn. I'll direct a half, and he'll direct another half." In October of the same year, Steve Asbell (President of Fox Studios) stated that the studio has plans to eventually develop an Alien and Predator crossover film.

The Weyland-Yutani Corporation featured in the Alien franchise along with their particular android model included in Alien: Romulus appears in the upcoming Predator: Badlands film as a stepping stone towards a third Alien vs. Predator film. In April 2025, journalist Jeff Sneider reported that there is a Predator included in the script for the Romulus sequel, which would mark another step towards laying the groundwork for a third crossover film. In October 2025, Trachtenberg stated in an interview with IGN that Predator: Badlands is set in the far future after the events of all the previous Alien and Alien vs. Predator films and the Alien: Earth TV-series so as to avoid any potential continuity conflicts, considering Romulus and Earth were still in production when Badlands was being produced.

==== Alien vs. Predator (2004) ====
In 2004, a Predator mothership arrives in Earth orbit to draw humans to an ancient Predator training ground on Bouvetøya, an island about one thousand miles north of Antarctica. A buried pyramid giving off a "heat bloom" attracts a group of explorers led by billionaire and self-taught engineer Charles Bishop Weyland (Lance Henriksen), the original founder and CEO of Weyland Industries, who unknowingly activates an Alien egg production line as a hibernating Alien Queen is awakened within the pyramid. Three Predators descend to the planet and enter the structure, killing all humans in their way with the intention of hunting the newly formed Aliens, while the scattered explorers are captured alive by Aliens and implanted with embryos. Two Predators die in the ensuing battle with an Alien, while the third allies itself with the lone surviving human, Alexa "Lex" Woods (Sanaa Lathan), while making their way out of the pyramid as it is destroyed by the Predator's wrist bomb and eventually does battle with the escaped Alien Queen on the surface. The Queen is defeated by being dragged down by a water tower into the dark depths of the frozen sea, but not before she fatally wounds the last Predator. The orbiting Predator mothership uncloaks and the crew retrieves the fallen Predator. A Predator elder gives Lex a spear as a sign of respect and then departs. Once in orbit, it is revealed that an Alien Chestburster was present within the corpse, thus a predator/alien hybrid is born.

==== Aliens vs. Predator: Requiem (2007) ====
Set immediately after the events of the previous film, the Predalien hybrid aboard the Predator scout ship, having just separated from the mothership shown in the previous film, has grown to full adult size and sets about killing the Predators aboard the ship, causing it to crash in the small town of Gunnison, Colorado. The last surviving Predator activates a distress beacon containing a video recording of the Predalien, which is received by a veteran Predator on the Predator homeworld, who sets off towards Earth to "clean up" the infestation. When it arrives, the Predator tracks the Aliens into a section of the sewer below the town. He removes evidence of their presence as he moves along using a corrosive blue liquid and uses a laser net to try to contain the creatures, but the Aliens still manage to escape into the town above. The Predator fashions a plasma pistol from its remaining plasma caster and hunts Aliens all across town, accidentally cutting the power to the town in the process. During a confrontation with human survivors, the Predator loses its plasma pistol. The Predator then fights the Predalien singlehandedly, and the two mortally wound one another just as the US Air Force drops a tactical nuclear bomb on the town, incinerating both combatants along with the Predalien's warriors and hive, as well as the few remaining humans in the town. The salvaged plasma pistol is then taken to a Ms. Yutani of the Yutani Corporation, foreshadowing an advancement in technology leading to the future events of the Alien films.

=== Future ===
In 2025, Trachtenberg stated he had three initial Predator films in mind to make: Predator: Killer of Killers, Predator: Badlands, and a third that he intends to direct if Badlands is successful. Discussions are ongoing with original franchise star Arnold Schwarzenegger about reprising his role as Dutch in a future installment. In a January 2023 interview, Prey star Amber Midthunder said the cast of that film was in talks with Trachtenberg for a sequel.

== Short films ==
Predator short films
| Film | US release date | Director(s) | Screenwriter(s) |
|---|---|---|---|
| The Chosen | October 19, 2010 | Nimród Antal | Alex Litvak & Michael Finch |
| Moments of Extraction | October 19, 2010 | N/A | Javier Soto |
| Crucified | October 19, 2010 | N/A | Javier Soto |
| Predator vs. Colonial Marines | February 25, 2016 | Julian Higgins | Peter Weidman |
| The Predator Holiday Special | December 18, 2018 | David H. Brooks and Alex Kamer | Matt Motschenbacher and Matthew Senreich |

On October 19, 2010, Predators was released on home video and included the two prequel short films Moments of Extraction and Crucified, along with the prequel short film The Chosen, which had aired as a television and cinema advertisement prior to the release of Predators. Loot Crate (commonly known for producing and distributing various officially licensed merchandise based on the Alien, Predator, Alien vs. Predator, and Prometheus brands) released a VR 360° short film titled Predator vs. Colonial Marines in February 2016, directed by Julian Higgins and written by Peter Weidman in which a troop of Colonial Marines storm a Weyland-Yutani warehouse and encounter the deadly alien hunter. The Predator was released on DVD, Blu-ray and 4K Ultra HD formats on December 18, 2018, in America, alongside the short stop-motion film The Predator Holiday Special, in which Santa Claus and his elves and reindeer encounter the Predators at the North Pole.

== Cast and crew ==
=== Principal cast ===
List indicators

This section includes characters who will appear or have appeared in the film series.

- An empty grey cell indicates the character was not in the film, or that the character's official presence has not yet been confirmed.
- ^{C} indicates a cameo role.
- ^{E} indicates an appearance not included in the theatrical cut.
- ^{U} indicates an uncredited appearance.
- ^{V} indicates a voice-only role.
- ^{Y} indicates a younger version of the character.

Predator cast
| Characters | Films | | | | | | | Video games | |
| Characters | Predator | Predator 2 | Predators | The Predator | Prey | Predator: Killer of Killers | Predator: Badlands | Predator: Concrete Jungle | Predator: Hunting Grounds |
|---|---|---|---|---|---|---|---|---|---|
| Characters | 1987 | 1990 | 2010 | 2018 | 2022 | 2025 | 2025 | 2005 | 2020 |
==== Recurring cast and characters ====
| Predators | Kevin Peter Hall | Kevin Peter Hall | Derek Mears (classic) | Brian A. Prince (fugitive) | Dane DiLiegro | Britton Watkins^{V} | Dimitrius Schuster-Koloamatangi (Dek) | Aimée Leigh^{V} | Antonio Alvarez^{V} |
| Predators | Peter Cullen^{V} | Hal Rayle^{V} | Brian Steele (Falconer and Berserker) | Brian A. Prince (ultimate) | Dane DiLiegro | Britton Watkins^{V} | Reuben de Jong (Njohrr) | Sarah Brown^{V} | Antonio Alvarez^{V} |
| Predators | Peter Cullen^{V} | Hal Rayle^{V} | Carey L. Jones (tracker) | Brian A. Prince (ultimate) | Dane DiLiegro | Britton Watkins^{V} | Mike Homik (Kwei) | Sarah Brown^{V} | Antonio Alvarez^{V} |
| Alan "Dutch" Schaefer | Arnold Schwarzenegger | | | | | Arnold Schwarzenegger^{U}^{L}^{C}^{E} | | | Arnold Schwarzenegger^{V} |
| Anna Gonsalves | Elpidia Carrillo | Elpidia Carrillo^{C} | | | | | | | |
| El Scorpio Guerilla | Henry Kingi^{U} | Henry Kingi | | | | | | | |
| Michael "Mike" R. Harrigan | | Danny Glover | | | | Danny Glover^{U}^{L}^{C}^{E} | | | |
| King Willie | | Calvin Lockhart | | | | | | Arthur Burghardt^{V} | |
| Hanzō Kamakami Kenji and Kiyoshi Kamakami | | | Louis Ozawa Changchien | | | Louis Ozawa Changchien^{V} | | | |
| Isabelle Nissenbaum | | | Alice Braga | | | | | | Alice Braga^{V} |
| Sean H. Keyes | | | | Jake Busey | | | | | Jake Busey^{V} |
| Raphael Adolini | | | | | Bennett Taylor | | | | |
| Naru | | | | | Amber Midthunder | Amber Midthunder^{U}^{L}^{C} | | | |
| Scarface | | | | | | | | Jan Johns^{V} | Jan Johns^{V} |
==== Introduced in Predator ====
| Al Dillon | Carl Weathers | | | | | | | | |
| Jorge "Poncho" Ramirez | Richard Chaves | | | | | | | | |
| Mac Eliot | Bill Duke | | | | | | | | |
| Blain Cooper | Jesse Ventura | | | | | | | | |
| Billy Sole | Sonny Landham | | | | | | | | |
| Rick Hawkins | Shane Black | | | | | | | | |
| Homer L. Phillips | R. G. Armstrong | | | | | | | | |
==== Introduced in Predator 2 ====
| Peter Jacob Keyes | | Gary Busey | | | | | | | |
| Danny "Danny Boy" Archuleta | | Rubén Blades | | | | | | | |
| Leona Cantrell | | María Conchita Alonso | | | | | | | |
| Garber | | Adam Baldwin | | | | | | | |
| Jerry Lambert | | Bill Paxton | | | | | | | |
| Anthony "Tony" Pope | | Morton Downey Jr. | | | | | | | |
| Phil Heinemann | | Robert Davi | | | | | | | |
| Captain B. Pilgrim | | Kent McCord | | | | | | | |
==== Introduced in Predators ====
| Royce | | | Adrien Brody | | | | | | |
| Edwin | | | Topher Grace | | | | | | |
| Walter Stans | | | Walton Goggins | | | | | | |
| Nikolai Mikhalovich Fedorov | | | Oleg Taktarov | | | | | | |
| Mombasa | | | Mahershala Ali | | | | | | |
| Cuchillo | | | Danny Trejo | | | | | | |
| Ronald Noland | | | Laurence Fishburne | | | | | | |
==== Introduced in The Predator ====
| Quentine "Quinn" McKenna | | | | Boyd Holbrook | | | | | |
| Casey Bracket | | | | Olivia Munn | | | | | |
| Will Traeger | | | | Sterling K. Brown | | | | | |
| Gaylord "Nebraska" Williams | | | | Trevante Rhodes | | | | | |
| Rory McKenna | | | | Jacob Tremblay | | | | | |
| Coyle | | | | Keegan-Michael Key | | | | | |
| Lynch | | | | Alfie Allen | | | | | |
| Nettles | | | | Augusto Aguilera | | | | | |
| Baxley | | | | Thomas Jane | | | | | |
| Emma McKenna | | | | Yvonne Strahovski | | | | | |
| Cullen Yutani | | | | Françoise Yip^{E} | | | | | |
==== Introduced in Prey ====
| Taabe | | | | | Dakota Beavers | | | | |
| Aruka | | | | | Michelle Thrush | | | | |
| Wasape | | | | | Stormee Kipp | | | | |
| Chief Kehetu | | | | | Julian Black Antelope | | | | |
==== Introduced in Predator: Killer of Killers ====
| Ursa | | | | | | Lindsay LaVanchy^{V} Cherami Leigh^{Y}^{V} | | | |
| Freya | | | | | | Lauren Holt^{V} | | | |
| Einar | | | | | | Doug Cockle^{V} | | | |
| Ivar | | | | | | Jeff Leach^{V} | | | |
| Anders | | | | | | Damien Haas^{V} | | | |
| Gunnar | | | | | | Piotr Michael^{V} | | | |
| Chief Zoran | | | | | | Andrew Morgado^{V} | | | |
| Johnny Torres | | | | | | Rick Gonzalez^{V} | | | |
| Vandenberg "Vandy" | | | | | | Michael Biehn^{V} | | | |
| Torres' father | | | | | | Felix Solis^{V} | | | |
==== Introduced in Predator: Badlands ====
| Thia | | | | | | | Elle Fanning | | |
| Tessa | | | | | | | Elle Fanning | | |
| Njohrr Apex Predator | | | | | | | Reuben De Jong Dimitrius Schuster-Koloamatangi^{V} | | |
| Kwei | | | | | | | Mike Homik Stefan Grube^{V} | | |
| Bud | | | | | | | Rohinal Nayaran | | |
| Drone Synthetic | | | | | | | Cameron Brown | | |
| MU/TH/UR | | | | | | | Alison Wright^{V} | | |
==== Introduced in Predator: Concrete Jungle ====
| Isabella Borgia MOTHER | | | | | | | | Tasia Valenza^{V} | |
| Lucretia Borgia | | | | | | | | Giselle Loren^{V} | |
| Bruno Borgia | | | | | | | | Fred Tatasciore^{V} | |
| El Hongo | | | | | | | | Armando Valdes-Kennedy^{V} | |
| Hunter Borgia | | | | | | | | David Sobolov^{V} | |
==== Introduced in Predator: Hunting Grounds ====
| Soldier | | | | | | | | | James Willems^{V} |

== Additional production and crew details ==
| Film | Crew/Detail | | | | | |
| Film | Composer(s) | Cinematographer | Editor(s) | Production companies | Distributing companies | Running time |
|---|---|---|---|---|---|---|
| Predator | Alan Silvestri | Donald McAlpine | John F. Link & Mark Helfrich | 20th Century Fox, Davis Entertainment | 20th Century Fox | 1 hr 47 mins |
| Predator 2 | Alan Silvestri | Peter Levy | Mark Goldblatt & Bert Lovitt | 20th Century Fox, Davis Entertainment, Silver Pictures, Gordon Company | 20th Century Fox | 1 hr 48 mins |
| Alien vs. Predator | Harald Kloser | David Johnson | Alexander Berner | 20th Century Fox, Davis Entertainment, Brandywine Productions, Impact Pictures, Stillking Films | 20th Century Fox | 1 hr 41 mins |
| Aliens vs. Predator: Requiem | Brian Tyler | Daniel C. Pearl | Dan Zimmerman | 20th Century Fox, Davis Entertainment, Brandywine Productions, Dune Entertainment | 20th Century Fox | 1 hr 34 mins |
| Predators | John Debney | Gyula Pados | Dan Zimmerman | 20th Century Fox, Davis Entertainment, Troublemaker Studios | 20th Century Fox | 1 hr 47 mins |
| The Predator | Henry Jackman | Larry Fong | Harry B. Miller III & Billy Weber | 20th Century Fox, Davis Entertainment | 20th Century Fox | 1 hr 48 mins |
| Prey | Sarah Schachner | Jeff Cutter | Angela M. Catanzaro & Claudia Castello | 20th Century Studios, Davis Entertainment, Lawrence Gordon Productions | 20th Century Studios, Hulu | 1 hr 39 mins |
| Predator: Killer of Killers | Benjamin Wallfisch | —N/a | Stefan Grube | 20th Century Studios, Davis Entertainment, Lawrence Gordon Productions, The Third Floor, Inc. | 20th Century Studios, Hulu | 1 hr 30 mins |
| Predator: Badlands | Sarah Schachner & Benjamin Wallfisch | Jeff Cutter | Stefan Grube | 20th Century Studios, Davis Entertainment, Lawrence Gordon Productions | 20th Century Studios | 1 hr 47 mins |

== Reception ==
=== Box office performance ===
Box office performance of Predator films
| Film | Release date | Grosses | | | Rank (all time domestic) | Budget | References |
| Film | Release date | United States | Non-US | Worldwide | Rank (all time domestic) | Budget | References |
|---|---|---|---|---|---|---|---|
| Predator | June 12, 1987 | $59,735,548 | $38,532,910 | $98,268,458 | #1,350 | $15–18 million | |
| Predator 2 | November 21, 1990 | $30,669,413 | $26,450,905 | $57,120,318 | #2,605 | $20–30 million | |
| Predators | July 9, 2010 | $52,000,688 | $75,232,420 | $127,233,108 | #1,584 | $40 million | |
| The Predator | September 14, 2018 | $51,024,708 | $109,517,426 | $160,542,134 | #3,051 | $88 million | |
| Predator: Badlands | November 7, 2025 | $91,052,601 | $93,381,149 | $184,433,750 | N/A | $105 million | N/A |
| Total | | $284,482,958 | $343,114,810 | $627,597,768 | | $268–281 million | |

=== Critical and public response ===
| Film | Rotten Tomatoes | Metacritic | CinemaScore |
|---|---|---|---|
| Predator | 64% (116 reviews) | 47 (17 reviews) | B+ |
| Predator 2 | 36% (119 reviews) | 46 (19 reviews) | B+ |
| Predators | 65% (202 reviews) | 51 (30 reviews) | C+ |
| The Predator | 34% (296 reviews) | 48 (49 reviews) | C+ |
| Prey | 94% (291 reviews) | 71 (43 reviews) | —N/a (Note: This film was released on streaming services; CinemaScore only provides ratings for films released in theaters.) |
| Predator: Killer of Killers | 95% (111 reviews) | 78 (18 reviews) | —N/a |
| Predator: Badlands | 86% (278 reviews) | 71 (43 reviews) | A- |

== Music ==
Soundtracks to Predator films
| Title | US release date | Length | Composer(s) | Label |
|---|---|---|---|---|
| Predator: Original Motion Picture Soundtrack | August 19, 2003 (original release); August 2, 2010 (remastered edition) | 69:08 | Alan Silvestri | Varèse Sarabande; Fox Music; Intrada Records |
| Predator 2: Original Motion Picture Soundtrack | December 13, 1990 | 45:14 | Alan Silvestri | Varèse Sarabande |
| Predators: Original Motion Picture Soundtrack | July 5, 2010 | 68:25 | John Debney | La-La Land Records |
| The Predator: Original Motion Picture Soundtrack | September 28, 2018 | 54:00 | Henry Jackman | Lakeshore Records |
| Prey (Original Soundtrack) | August 5, 2022 | 45:07 | Sarah Schachner | Hollywood Records |
| Predator: Killer of Killers (Original Soundtrack) | June 6, 2025 | 68:04 | Benjamin Wallfisch | Hollywood Records |
| Predator: Badlands (Original Motion Picture Soundtrack) | November 7, 2025 | 66:48 | Sarah Schachner, Benjamin Wallfisch | Hollywood Records |

== Home media ==
Home media releases for Predator films
| Title | Format | Release date | Films | References |
|---|---|---|---|---|
| Predator: Special Edition Collection | DVD | April 18, 2005 | Predator, Predator 2 | |
| Predator: The Ultimate DVD Collection | DVD | November 17, 2006 | Predator, Predator 2, Alien vs. Predator | |
| Predator Collection | DVD/Blu-ray formats | October 19, 2010 | Predator, Predator 2 | |
| Predator Trilogy - Mask Edition | Blu-ray | December 29, 2010 | Predator, Predator 2, Predators | |
| Predator Trilogy | DVD | March 4, 2011 | Predator, Predator 2, Predators | |
| Predator Triple Feature | Blu-ray/4K UHD Blu-ray | October 7, 2014 | Predator, Predator 2, Predators | |
| Predator: 3-Movie Collection | Blu-ray/4K UHD Blu-ray | August 7, 2018 | Predator, Predator 2, Predators | |
| Predator: 4-Movie Collection | Blu-ray/4K UHD Blu-ray | December 18, 2018 | Predator, Predator 2, Predators, The Predator | |
| Prey | DVD/Blu-ray/4k UHD Blu-ray | October 3, 2023 | Prey | |
| Predator: Badlands | DVD/Blu-ray/Ultra HD Blu-ray | February 17, 2026 | Predator: Badlands | |

== Other media ==
=== Novels ===
Several novelizations based upon the movies have been released.

==== Movie novelizations ====
- Predator by Paul Monette, Jove Books, June 1, 1987, ISBN 0-515-09002-6
- Predator 2 by Simon Hawke, Jove Books, December 1990, ISBN 0-515-10578-3
- The Predator: Hunters and Hunted by James A. Moore, Titan Books, July 31, 2018 ISBN 978-1785658051
- The Predator by Christopher Golden & Mark Morris, Titan Books, September 2018, ISBN 978-1785658051

==== Original novels ====
The first two novels Concrete Jungle and Cold War are written and based on the 1990s Dark Horse comic series original created by Mark Verheiden, Chris Warner and Ron Randall. The video game Concrete Jungle borrowed the title from the series but chose an entirely different story arc.

- Predator: Concrete Jungle by Nathan Archer
- Predator: Cold War by Nathan Archer
- Predator: Big Game by Sandy Schofield
- Predator: Forever Midnight by John Shirley
- Predator: Flesh and Blood by Michael Jan Friedman
- Predator: Turnabout by Steve Perry
- Predator: South China Sea by Jeff VanderMeer
- Predator: Prey to the Heavens by John Arcudi and Javier Saltares
- The Predator: Hunters and Hunted by James A. Moore
- Predator: Stalking Shadows by James A. Moore

=== Comic books ===
Dark Horse Comics published various lines based on the franchise. The Fire and Stone (2014–2015) and Life and Death (2016–2017) series further explored what happened in the Alien, Predator, Alien vs. Predator, and Prometheus universe following the events of the 2012 film Prometheus. In July 2020, Marvel Comics announced that it had acquired the comic book rights to the Predator franchise, in addition to the rights to the Alien and Alien vs. Predator franchises, publishing Predator (2022–present), Predator vs. Wolverine (2023), Predator vs. Black Panther (2024), Predator vs. Spider-Man, Predator: Black, White & Blood, and Predator Kills the Marvel Universe (all 2025).

=== Books ===
Other books expanding this fictional universe have been released through the years, and also such that depict the background to the films, including works by special effects company Amalgamated Dynamics Incorporated (ADI) which has worked with the Alien, Predator and Alien vs. Predator films.

- Predator The Official Movie Special (2018)
- The Predator: The Art and Making of the Film (2018)

=== Video games ===
- Predator (1987)
- Predator 2 (1990)
- Predator 2 (1992)
- Predator: Concrete Jungle (2005)
- Predator: Hunting Grounds (2020)

=== Pinball ===
The Predators have appeared in two virtual pinball tables. The first one is a pinball adaptation of the first two Predator films, one of four pinball tables in the 1999 computer game Sci-Fi Pinball, with the other three tables being based on Aliens, Buffy the Vampire Slayer and The Fly, three other Fox horror films. The second one is a loose pinball adaptation of Alien vs. Predator, developed by Zen Studios and available as an add-on pack for Zen Pinball 2, Pinball FX 2 and Pinball FX 3 on April 26, 2016. Based on the premise and setting (though not the plot) of that film, this table is played entirely from the perspective of a Predator ascending the ranks to become a seasoned warrior and Alien hunter, with two of the film's human leads being the table's announcers.

In the early 2010s, pinball manufacturer SKIT-B attempted to create an unauthorized physical pinball adaptation of the Predator franchise, without securing licensing rights from franchise owner 20th Century Fox. After suffering from legal problems, the pinball table was cancelled on March 24, 2015, and thus, only a few prototypes of the pinball table exists to this day.

=== Card game ===
A card game, titled Legendary Encounters: A Predator Deck Building Game, was released in July 2015 by Upper Deck Company. It is based on the first two films.

=== Other appearances ===
- The Predator is a downloadable character in Mortal Kombat X (2015).
- The Predator is a free challenging boss featured in Tom Clancy's Ghost Recon Wildlands.
- The Predator is an unlockable outfit and hostile NPC in Fortnite Battle Royale Chapter 2 Season 5.
- The Predator was licensed by Adult Swim to officially appear in the 2023 seventh-season premiere of the animated series Rick and Morty, "How Poopy Got His Poop Back".

== See also ==
- Outline of science fiction
- List of films featuring extraterrestrials
- List of monster movies
- Predatoroonops, a genus of spider named in honor of the Predator

== Bibliography ==
- Beautiful Monsters: The Unofficial and Unauthorised Guide to the Alien and Predator Films (by David A. McIntee, Telos, 272 pages, 2005, ISBN 1903889944).
