= Prey (soundtrack) =

Prey (Original Soundtrack)

Film score by Sarah Schachner
- Released: August 5, 2022
- Studios: Newman Scoring Stage, 20th Century Studios
- Genre: Film score
- Length: 45:27
- Label: Hollywood
- Producer: Sarah Schachner

Sarah Schachner chronology
Assassin's Creed Valhalla (2020)	Prey (2022)	Predator: Badlands (2025)

Prey (Original Soundtrack) is the score album to the 2022 film of the same name directed by Dan Trachtenberg, which is the fifth instalment of the Predator franchise and a prequel to the first four films. The original score is composed by Sarah Schachner, the fourth composer to score for the franchise. (Note: Alan Silvestri, the original composer scored for Predator (1987) and Predator 2 (1990), followed by John Debney scoring for Predators (2010) and Henry Jackman for The Predator (2018).) Unlike the previous films, the score does not refer Alan Silvestri's themes from the first film, but featured new original themes created and curated for the film, focusing the principal character Naru (Amber Midthunder) and her emotional story and evolution. Several ancient string instruments have been used in the score, as the film is set during the 18th century America, while the score also featured Pueblo musician and flautist Robert Mirabal.

The score album was released by Hollywood Records on August 5, 2022. It received generally positive reviews, praising the instrumentation, sound and tunes being set to the 18th century, and also the fresh themes, without being referred to Silvestri's compositions for the previous Predator films.

== Development ==
In June 2022, Sarah Schachner was announced to score incidental music for Prey. She previously composed and arranged for several video games, and also assisted on the scores of The Expendables 2 (2012), Iron Man 3 and Now You See Me (2013). During the pre-production, Dan Trachtenberg, the film's director had listened to her score for Assassin's Creed Valhalla and hired her for the film. Schachner had said that "We were making a Predator film with all the fun gory action and suspense you'd expect, but the music had to simultaneously tell Naru's emotional story and her evolution". The story was considered similar to the previous instalments, though as a prequel set in the 18th century, Schachner stated her challenge was to "balance the score feeling equally large and expansive as well as intimate and raw", hence she felt that music had a strong role in the film with minimal dialogues.

She performed and recorded all the string instruments for the score, which were ancient instruments, including a horsehead cello from Mongolia, and a primitive violin imported from Kazakhstan. While performing the main theme, she said "that came about almost in full form right away. I have a voice note of me playing it and working it out for the first time on the double bass [...] I tend to channel my own emotions directly into my playing, so writing and performing all the increasingly aggressive iterations of the 'Predator' motif was like therapy for me." She collaborated with Trachtenberg on creating Naru's theme; Schachner opined that the latter was adamant on how the theme "should feel like a journey, that it starts small and really take you somewhere". However, she did not score on how the film was shot, as the original version of Naru's theme in the soundtrack, was longer than the theme in the film; she further added that the crew shot more footage to accommodate the song duration.

Pueblo musician and Native American flute player Robert Mirabal played one of the tracks, after Schachner was looking for other native instrumentalists to collaborate with when she came across a YouTube video of the musician. He was intrigued by the story of the film, and agreed to record the tracks. She recorded one of the themes using multiple wind instruments, remotely during the COVID-19 pandemic on Zoom and asked to sing the tunes. She felt that, it was perfect "to give that extra layer of depth to the film".

== Track listing ==
No.	Title	Length
1.	"Predator Instinct"	3:02
2.	"Thrill of the Chase"	0:55
3.	"Naru and Sarii"	0:58
4.	"Beyond the Great Plains"	1:37
5.	"Five Senses"	2:28
6.	"The Night Has Ears"	2:31
7.	"Communion" (ft. Robert Mirabal)	1:19
8.	"Naru's Way"	3:13
9.	"Flesh and Bone"	3:10
10.	"Orange Totsiyaa"	0:52
11.	"Moon Wanderer"	0:55
12.	"The Onslaught"	2:13
13.	"Trapped"	3:13
14.	"Foolish Foray"	2:43
15.	"The Cruel Delight"	2:06
16.	"Horseback Ambush"	2:30
17.	"Human Bait"	3:31
18.	"Brave Girl"	5:03
19.	"Seeing with New Eyes"	1:50
20.	"The Hunter"	1:19

== Reception ==
The musical score received praise from critics. Jonathan Broxton of Movie Music UK wrote "Prey is impressive stuff. Sarah Schachner has created a fascinating sonic environment for these characters to inhabit, one which is deeply rooted in the musical traditions of Comanche culture, but which also has a disturbing, violently alien element that shatters their world with relentlessly aggressive dissonance. The central theme for Naru is great, and the handful of times that Schachner allows it to ring out clearly are the score's highlights. But large stretches of the score are very intense and challenging and often amount to little more than banks of roaring cello pulses and clattering percussion; they are superb in context, but the primeval power of Schachner's sound may be too much for some to stomach." Zanobard Reviews wrote "Sarah Schachner's score for Prey is very different indeed to what you'd probably expect from a Predator score, but that's what makes it so interesting. It's a very heavily strings-focused experience, with tribal percussion and woodwinds mixed in too but mainly acting as background instruments for the sheer power that the strings deliver. Apparently Sarah Schachner herself plays the strings recorded here, and fair play to her as they sound absolutely phenomenal throughout the entire album, especially during its more hopeful, upbeat sections".

However, criticised for not using the classic Predator themes in the score, adding that "Silvestri's six-note percussive motif for the iconic aliens appears basically once on the entire album (which is odd because it recurs quite a few times in the film) and even then it plays so differently that it's barely recognisable as itself, which for me kind of defeats the point of reprising a theme – it's supposed to be a clearly recognisable musical representation of a character or setting, which this just isn't unless you are really listening for it. Silvestri's other Predator themes are a bit missed here as well, which is a shame as they could have fit quite nicely with Shachner's tense, strings-heavy style, even just in passing." Filmtracks.com wrote "Prey is not a Predator score, and some halfway point between the two disparate sounds would have been preferred. As it stands, Prey is adequate to the task but dissatisfyingly disconnected from the franchise. Its rendering is so hostile in performance inflection that it makes for a poor listening experience on album." Odie Henderson of RogerEbert.com called the score as "striking". Fran Ruiz of Space.com wrote that "Sarah Schachner's atypical yet tense and adventurous score rivals Alan Silvestri's unforgettable Predator soundtrack with its own identity".

== Personnel ==
Credits adapted from AllMusic

- Greg Hayes – mixing
- Robert Mirabal – vocals
- Sarah Schachner – composer, producer
- Patricia Sullivan – mastering
- Frank Wolf – mixing

== Chart performance ==
Chart (2022)	Peak position
UK Soundtrack Albums (OCC)	35
