= Predator: Badlands (soundtrack) =

2025 soundtrack by Sarah Schachner and Benjamin Wallfisch

Predator: Badlands (Original Motion Picture Soundtrack)

Film score by Sarah Schachner and Benjamin Wallfisch
- Released: November 7, 2025
- Recorded: 2025
- Studios: Simon Leadley Scoring Stage, Trackdown Studios, Sydney; The Mix Lab, Studio F, Santa Monica, California
- Genre: Film score
- Length: 66:48
- Label: Hollywood
- Producers: Sarah Schachner; Benjamin Wallfisch

Sarah Schachner chronology
Prey (2022)	Predator: Badlands (2025)

Benjamin Wallfisch chronology
It: Welcome to Derry (2025)	Predator: Badlands (2025)	Mortal Kombat II (2026)

Predator: Badlands (Original Motion Picture Soundtrack) is the film score to the 2025 film Predator: Badlands directed by Dan Trachtenberg, which is the ninth installment in the Predator franchise. The film score is jointly composed by Sarah Schachner and Benjamin Wallfisch and released by Hollywood Records on November 7, 2025.

== Background ==
In October 2025, it was announced that Sarah Schachner and Benjamin Wallfisch would compose the film score for Predator: Badlands. Both composers had worked with the director in the previous instalments of the franchise, Prey (2022) and Predator: Killer of Killers (2025). Trachtenberg did not want to use the themes composed by Alan Silvestri from the original Predator films, as both composers had used the original themes for their respective installments and did not want to do that again. He wanted to find something special for the sound of the Yautja culture and felt the film needed its own identity and original music without borrowing themes from Silvestri's score. This decision provided the musical landscape for Predator: Badlands. The score was recorded at the Simon Leadley Scoring Stage at the Trackdown Studios, Sydney and performed by the Sydney Scoring Orchestra.

== Release ==
Predator: Badlands (Original Motion Picture Soundtrack) was released through Hollywood Records on November 7, 2025, the same day as the film's release.

== Reception ==
Zanobard Reviews rated 8/10 and wrote "Sarah Schachner and Benjamin Wallfisch's thunderously vocal score for Predator: Badlands succeeds in just how dramatically different it is, with the use of the Yautja language as a powerfully chanting theme for Dek alongside pounding drums standing out significantly – altogether almost making up for the complete lack of Alan Silvestri material." Richard Lawson of The Hollywood Reporter and Peter Debruge of Variety called it "bombastic" and "thrilling". Tim Grierson of Screen International noted that the duo's "percussion-heavy electronic score" drives the film.

Paul Klein of Filmhounds called it "a truly pulse pounding score by both Sarah Schachner and Benjamin Wallsfisch". Eric Goldman of MovieWeb wrote "Prey composer Sarah Schachner and Killer of Killers composer Benjamin Wallfisch team for a stirring score". Sarah El-Mahmoud of Cinemablend wrote "Predator: Badlands carves out its own identity, from its memorable score by Prey composer Sarah Schachner alongside Killer of Killers’ Benjamin Wallfisch, and a real attention to detail as a whole." Jordan Farley of GamesRadar+ called it a "chest-thumping, percussive score, which incorporates Yautja vocals in a hair-raising way". Jeremy Mathai of /Film wrote "composers Sarah Schachner and Benjamin Wallfisch's chameleonic score [is] memorably bombastic and electronic in certain portions, an all-out orchestral extravaganza in others."

== Track listing ==
No.	Title	Music	Length
1.	"Yautja Prime"	Sarah Schachner	1:32
2.	"Brothers"	Benjamin Wallfisch	3:18
3.	"Earn Your Place"	Schachner	2:04
4.	"Bad Plant"	Schachner	1:50
5.	"Badlands"	Schachner	1:05
6.	"Genna"	Schachner	0:45
7.	"Spiky Plants"	Schachner	1:58
8.	"Meet Thia"	Schachner	2:26
9.	"Other Half"	Schachner	1:35
10.	"Tessa"	Schachner	2:06
11.	"Razor Grass"	Wallfisch	5:06
12.	"Copycat"	Schachner	0:59
13.	"The Alpha"	Schachner	1:47
14.	"Lost and Found"	Schachner	2:50
15.	"The Kalisk"	Wallfisch	4:23
16.	"Sisters"	Schachner	3:20
17.	"Wolfpack"	Schachner	1:56
18.	"Infiltration"	Schachner	1:58
19.	"Leg Fight"	Schachner	1:17
20.	"Let’s Go Hunt"	Wallfisch	4:57
21.	"Chosen Family"	Schachner	1:52
22.	"Last Chance"	Schachner	3:31
23.	"Betrayed"	Schachner	1:24
24.	"The Partnership"	Schachner	2:28
25.	"Dek of the Yautja"	Schachner	2:10
26.	"Prey to None"	Wallfisch	3:21
27.	"Yautja Prayer"	Wallfisch	4:49
Total length:			66:48

== Personnel ==
Credits adapted from Film Music Reporter:

- Music composers and producers: Sarah Schachner and Benjamin Wallfisch
- Supervising music editors: Dan DiPrima, Stephen Perone
- Music editors: Oliver Hug, Matt Fausak
- Orchestra: Sydney Scoring Orchestra
- Score conductor: Christopher Gordon
- Lead Orchestrators: Tim Davies, David Krystal
- Orchestrators: Sebastian Winter, David Cunningham
- Additional music: Sturdivant Adams, Ole Wiedekamm
- Music preparation: Booker White, Carolyn Burke, Megan Quinn
- Orchestra contractor: Alex Henery
- Recording studios: The Simon Leadley Scoring Stage, Trackdown Studios
- Recording: Craig Beckett, Kyle Moorman, Sarah Schachner
- Mixing studio: The Mix Lab, Studio F
- Mixing: Alan Meyerson, Alvin Wee, Frank Wolf
- Mastering: Reuben Cohen
- Programming: Kyle Moorman
- Score technical engineer: Caleb Cuzner
- Score engineer: Craig Beckett
- Assistant engineers: Isaac Ross, Jayden Whitbread
- Music librarians: Jessica Wells, Cliff Bradley, Matthew Chin
- Score coordinator: Elaine Beckett
- Protools operator: Liam Moses

== Charts ==
Chart performance for Predator: Badlands (Original Motion Picture Soundtrack)
Chart (2025)	Peak position
UK Album Downloads (Official Charts)	97
