= Predators (soundtrack) =

Predators (Original Motion Picture Soundtrack)

Soundtrack album by John Debney
- Released: July 5, 2010
- Genre: Soundtrack
- Length: 68:25
- Labels: La-La Land Records; LLLCD 1141

John Debney chronology
Valentine's Day (2010)	Predators (Original Motion Picture Soundtrack) (2010)	Iron Man 2 (2010)

Professional ratings
Review scores
Source	Rating
Allmusic	3.5/5 stars

Predators (Original Motion Picture Soundtrack) is the official soundtrack album of the 2010 science fiction film Predators. It was composed and orchestrated by John Debney, conducted by Pete Anthony, performed by the Hollywood Studio Symphony, and released on July 5, 2010 via La-La Land Records and Fox Music. The score is completely orchestral and makes use of several themes from the first two films composed by Alan Silvestri, as well as nods to Jerry Goldsmith's main title from Alien. The main "Predator"-theme plays for the first time in the film when the Predators first appear. Later, it is used at several points throughout the film.

== Track listing ==
1. "Free Fall" (Contains original Predator Theme by Alan Silvestri and Alien Main Title by Jerry Goldsmith) – 3:06
2. "Single Shooter" (Contains Original Predator Theme by Alan Silvestri) – 2:07
3. "This Is Hell" (Contains Original Predator Theme by Alan Silvestri) – 4:09
4. "Cages / Trip-Wire" (Contains Alien Main Title by Jerry Goldsmith) – 3:51
5. "Not of This Earth" (Contains Alien Main Title by Jerry Goldsmith) – 2:50
6. “Hound Attack" – 4:08
7. "We Run We Die" (Contains Alien Main Title by Jerry Goldsmith) – 4:39
8. "Predator Attack" (Contains Original Predator Theme by Alan Silvestri) – 1:46
9. "Meet Mr. Black" – 1:14
10. "They See Our Traps" (Contains Original Predator Theme by Alan Silvestri) – 2:25
11. "Over Here" – 2:23
12. "Smoke" (Contains Original Predator Theme by Alan Silvestri) – 2:37
13. "Nikolai Blows" (Contains Original Predator Theme by Alan Silvestri) – 2:09
14. "Stans’ Last Stand" – 1:48
15. "Hanzo’s Last Stand" (Contains Original Predator Theme by Alan Silvestri) – 3:08
16. "Leg Trap" – 2:22
17. "Take Me to the Ship" – 2:04
18. “Edwin and Isabelle Captured" (Contains Original Predator Theme by Alan Silvestri) – 1:33
19. "Predator Fight, Royce Runs" – 3:14
20. "Twisted Edwin / Royce Returns" – 3:25
21. "She's Paralyzed" (Contains Original Predator Theme by Alan Silvestri) – 6:04
22. "Royce vs. Predator" – 2:38
23. "Let’s Get Off This Planet" (Contains "End Title" from Predator 2 by Alan Silvestri) – 3:00
24. "Theme from Predator" (Contains Original Predator Theme by Alan Silvestri) – 1:45

== Personnel ==
- Art Direction [CD] – Mark Banning
- Engineer – Denis St. Amand
- Executive Producer [Executive Album Producer for La-la Land Records] – Matt Verboys
- Mastered By [Album Mastered By] – Patricia Sullivan
- Music By – John Debney
- Conducted By - Pete Anthony
- Performed By - The Hollywood Studio Symphony
- Producer [Album Produced By] – John Debney, M.V. Gerhard
- Recorded By [Recordist] – Tim Lauber
- Recorded and Mixed By [Digital Recording and Electronics Mixed By] – Erik Swanson
- Recorded and Mixed By [Score Recorded and Mixed] – Shawn Murphy
- Score Editor [Music Editor] – Jeff Carson (3)

℗ © 2010 Twentieth Century Fox Film Corporation

- Strings: 33 violins, 18 violas, 18 violoncellos, 10 double basses
- Woodwinds: 4 flutes, 3 oboes, 3 clarinets, 3 bassoons
- Brass: 7 French horns, 4 trumpets, 4 trombones, 2 tubas
- Percussion: 6 players
- 2 harps, 2 keyboards

== Reception ==
Whether you like this or not depends on one thing: Do you like Silvestri's previous scores? I have to say no to that question. The theme is the only thing I enjoyed from it and luckily that is still here. I hated the drum sequence from Predator 2 by the way and it's still here haunting me... The new updated theme for Predator is fun, and there's some good action material here to be fair. An excellent score for Predators the movie, a boring listen outside of it. John Debney did a fantastic job on this it has to be said. He went above the call of duty and created a score exactly what the film needed. —Jørn Tillnes, Soundtrack Geek

Ultimately, PREDATORS was a good re-make film with a serviceable sound design-y score, but it came from a man with the talents to produce something far better. Such a film deserved a score that was not only very effective against the picture — which DEBNEY’s effort undoubtedly was — but also offers listeners engaging material on album…which I have my doubts about. Next time, perhaps? —Marius Masalar, Bittersweet Nostalgia
