= We're All Gonna Die =

We're All Gonna Die may refer to:

== Music ==
- We're All Gonna Die (album), a 2016 album by Dawes, or the title song
- We're All Gonna Die, a 2013 album by Generation Kill
- "We're All Gonna Die", a song by Slash, from the 2010 album Slash
- "We’re All Gonna Die", an instrumental from the 1987 film Predator and its 2003 movie score album Predator: Original Motion Picture Score

== Other uses ==
- We're All Gonna Die (Even Jay Baruchel), a Canadian documentary television series
- We're All Gonna Die, a 2024 film by Freddie Wong and Matthew Arnold

== See also ==
- "We're All Going to Die", a 2007 song by Malcolm Middleton
- "We Are All Going to Die", a 2017 Spielbergs single released by Furuberget
- "Wir werden alle sterben" (German: We Are All Gonna Die), a song by Knorkator
- "We're Going To Die", a song from the 2004 film Cellular
- "We’re Gonna Die", an instrumental from the 1987 film Predator and its 2010 movie score album Predator
- We're Gonna Die, a 2011 play by Young Jean Lee
