= Predator: Killer of Killers (soundtrack) =

Predator: Killer of Killers (Original Soundtrack)

Film score by Benjamin Wallfisch
- Released: June 6, 2025
- Recorded: 2025
- Studios: Synchron Stage, Vienna; The Mix Lab, Santa Monica, California
- Genre: Film score
- Length: 68:04
- Label: Hollywood
- Producer: Benjamin Wallfisch

Benjamin Wallfisch chronology
Until Dawn (2025)	Predator: Killer of Killers (2025)	The Conjuring: Last Rites (2025)

Predator: Killer of Killers (Original Soundtrack) is the film score to the 2025 film Predator: Killer of Killers directed by Dan Trachtenberg, the sixth film and eighth installment overall in the Predator franchise. The film score is composed by Benjamin Wallfisch and released on June 6, 2025, via Hollywood Records.

== Background ==
Benjamin Wallfisch composed the film score, in his first composition for an animated feature film. (Note: Wallfisch previously composed the DreamWorks Animation short film Bilby (2018).) His involvement in the film was confirmed just five days prior to the film's release, though Wallfisch worked on the soundtrack throughout early 2025. The score was recorded at the Synchron Stage Vienna conducted by Bernhard Melbye Voss and orchestrated by Evan Rogers, Michael Lloyd, Sebastian Winter. The album was released through Hollywood Records on June 6, 2025, the same day as the film.

== Reception ==
Jonathan Broxton of Movie Music UK wrote "Predator: Killer of Killers is a great score, exciting and modern and frenetic, and with just enough of a hat-tip to classic Alan Silvestri to please long-standing franchise fans." In contrast, Filmtracks wrote "Overall, there is a lot to like in the strategy of Predator: Killer of Killers, Wallfisch as intelligent as ever in his spotting sessions. The "Japan, 1609" cue is quite wonderful at times. But his brutal, over-produced rendering is too obnoxious to tolerate, a trait not congruent with Silvestri's original vision for the concept. His music continues to prove that there is no need for the blaring bass region stupidity we hear decades later as the commonly accepted representation of masculinity in film music. Like Mortal Kombat, this score badly needs culled into the palatable portions, but there are simply not enough highlights to really make such an action worth the effort." Ben of Soundtrack Universe wrote "the score as a whole too often dips into highly processed and annoying modern action tropes to earn a higher rating, though if the streaming statistics are anything to go by, this reviewer remains very much in the minority with this opinion. In other words approach with caution and one's milage may vary... which seems to be a running motif with 2025 scores." Alex Maidy of JoBlo.com noted "With composer Benjamin Wallfisch giving his first score for an animated film, this movie never feels like a small effort and eschews the label often given to animated spin-offs." Amy West of GamesRadar+ described it as a "gorgeous score", Carlos Aguilar of Variety and Frank Scheck of The Hollywood Reporter called it "exhilarating" and "impactful".

== Track listing ==
No.	Title	Length
1.	"Earth 841 A.D"	2:34
2.	"Flaming Arrows"	3:02
3.	"Avenge Me"	2:42
4.	"Knock on the Front Door"	2:12
5.	"Sweet Revenge"	7:00
6.	"Through the Mist"	2:55
7.	"Japan, 1609"	4:02
8.	"20 Years Later"	2:40
9.	"Duel"	5:13
10.	"Predator vs. Kenji"	3:05
11.	"United"	2:31
12.	"Fallen Leaf"	2:55
13.	"Dreams Are Fuel"	1:16
14.	"What Does Flying Mean to You?"	2:17
15.	"Heat"	6:51
16.	"Flare"	3:45
17.	"Arena"	1:34
18.	"Weapon of Their Tribe"	3:28
19.	"Fight to the Death"	5:17
20.	"Remember Me"	2:45
Total length:		68:04

== Personnel ==
Credits adapted from liner notes:

- Music composer and producer: Benjamin Wallfisch
- Music editors: Daniel DiPrima, Stephen Perone
- Additional music: Peter Bateman, Alex Lu
- Score conductor: Bernhard Melbye Voss
- Supervising orchestrator: David Krystal
- Orchestrators: Evan Rogers, Michael Lloyd, Sebastian Winter, Peter Bateman, Alex Lu
- Music preparation: Sugi Shin, Stefan Höll
- Orchestra contractor: Marton Barka
- Score recording: Martin Weismayr
- Score mixing: Alvin Wee, Benjamin Wallfisch
- Digital recordist: Florian Spies
- Technical score engineer: Caleb Cuzner
- Score coordinator: Darrell Alexander
- Score recorded at: Vienna Synchron Stage
- Technical manager: Roland Tscherne
- Assistant technical manager: Cameron Masters
- Stage monitor mixer: Stephan Huber
- Vienna project Coordinators: Astrid Höger, Josy Svadja
- Score mixed at: The Mix Lab, Santa Monica

== See also ==
- Predator (franchise)
