= The Predator (soundtrack) =

The Predator: Original Motion Picture Soundtrack

Film score by Henry Jackman
- Released: September 28, 2018
- Genre: Film score
- Length: 54:55
- Labels: Lakeshore; Fox Music
- Producer: Henry Jackman

Henry Jackman chronology
Trial by Fire (2018)	The Predator: Original Motion Picture Soundtrack (2018)	Ralph Breaks the Internet (2018)

The Predator: Original Motion Picture Soundtrack is the score album to the 2018 film of the same name directed by Shane Black, who wrote the script with Fred Dekker, and is the fourth installment in the Predator franchise. The film is scored by Henry Jackman, the third composer to score for the franchise. (Note: Alan Silvestri, the original composer scored for Predator (1987) and Predator 2 (1990), followed by John Debney scoring for Predators (2010).) Jackman also incorporated original themes composed by Alan Silvestri from the 1987 film. The album was released by Lakeshore Records and Fox Music digitally on September 28, 2018 and through physical formats on October 5, 2018.

== Background and production ==
In March 2018, Henry Jackman was announced to compose the musical score for the film. In an interview, Jackman recalled the connection with the 1987 film, after watching the bootleg version of the film in school and listened to the original score by Alan Silvestri, which was a combination of sophisticated harmony and "a very dangerous and scary sounding version of jazz". Compared to future instalments on not referencing the themes from the predecessor, Jackman asked director Shane Black and the producer John Davis, on how critical to capture the spirit of the first film, and weave Silvestri's themes with his original cues, while also coming with fresh cues for the score; he called it as "a personal mission" to bring Silvestri's themes together as he wanted to "celebrate the score rather than avoiding it".

The symphony orchestra was the primary part of the film's score, which consisted variety of instruments: violins, violas, double bass, woodwinds, trombones, brass, cimbasso, temp and bass drums, and huge orchestral choir. On referencing Predator's score, Jackman noticed the use of harp in the score, adding "A lot of people mistakenly believe the harp is always going to be gentle, pretty and used explicitly for pastoral or sensitive moments. If you listen to the first Predator score, nothing can be further from the truth. There's quite a lot of marimba and harp used in scary ways, but that's due to how the harmony works. It's used to create tension to great effect." The use of electronic production and samplers, were not invasive as Jackman did not want to lose the primary force of the orchestra, but used in the crucial moments of the film. He further opined on using acoustic instruments and symphony, which would be tough and tricky to balance both the sounds.

Jackman wanted to deviate from the color and instrumentation to look at the fabric of the music, helping to be serious on the narrative and not rely on the texture. He also included the "Half Dirty Dozen Theme" which was different from the Predator theme, and woven into the score, to "distinguish from the constant scariness". He further added "It was for a moment in the film that had to do with all the crazies trying to come to the rescue, that thematic layer created contrast with the predator focused stuff."

== Track listing ==
No.	Title	Length
1.	"Arrival" (Contains Theme From Predator by Alan Silvestri)	2:59
2.	"Discovery" (Contains Theme From Predator by Alan Silvestri)	3:05
3.	"Rory"	1:32
4.	"Project Stargazer" (Contains Theme From Predator by Alan Silvestri)	2:01
5.	"Beautiful Specimen" (Contains Theme From Predator by Alan Silvestri)	1:37
6.	"Playing with Fire" (Contains Theme From Predator by Alan Silvestri)	1:11
7.	"Out of the Cage" (Contains Theme From Predator by Alan Silvestri)	2:40
8.	"The Loonies"	0:53
9.	"On the Loose" (Contains Theme From Predator by Alan Silvestri)	2:58
10.	"Another World" (Contains Theme From Predator by Alan Silvestri)	2:25
11.	"Rescue" (Contains Theme From Predator by Alan Silvestri)	1:55
12.	"Apex Predator" (Contains Theme From Predator by Alan Silvestri)	3:15
13.	"Damage Control"	1:01
14.	"The Good Soldier"	2:52
15.	"Team McKenna"	1:31
16.	"The Ark Ship"	2:18
17.	"Onslaught"	1:22
18.	"Contact"	2:07
19.	"The Hunt" (Contains Theme From Predator by Alan Silvestri)	3:36
20.	"The Sacrifice"	1:35
21.	"Alien Abduction"	1:27
22.	"The Last Stand"	3:27
23.	"Man vs. Predator" (Contains Theme From Predator by Alan Silvestri)	2:19
24.	"Remembrance"	1:36
25.	"The Predator's Gift" (Contains Theme From Predator by Alan Silvestri)	3:02

== Reception ==
The Predator's score received critical acclaim, praising Jackman's composition and integration of Silvestri's themes into the score. Zanobard Reviews gave 8/10 to the album, saying "Henry Jackman's score to The Predator is a wonderful throwback to Alan Silvestri's original themes and style, with some very faithful adaptations of said themes as well as some very nice imitations of his classic action brass. The only negative thing is we feel Jackman uses Silvestri's themes a little too much, especially since his music for the Predators and particularly the humans is actually quite good and so could have used a little more time on this album. We think, they probably could have carried a little more of the music on their own if Jackman had perhaps toned down the Silvestri just a little. Still, what we do have here is a pretty fantastic soundtrack, and a welcome return to that 1987 score we all know and love." Film Music Central wrote "Henry Jackman's score makes The Predator a better film than it would have been without it. Of course good music can only take a film so far, but Jackman certain put in a very good effort."

James Southall of Movie Wave wrote "The bulk of the score is either action or suspense-bordering-on-action and Jackman keeps things going on at a fast and furious pace most of the time. He does quote liberally from the Silvestri score (and from Back to the Future at times too) and even when he doesn't, he is imitating the other composer (which makes me wonder why they didn't just ask him to score it himself – well, maybe they did) but in any case, it's entertaining throughout and probably the best thing I've heard from him for a big blockbuster." Filmtracks.com wrote "When taken as a whole, however, the score seems like an exercise in checking certain boxes of needs rather than really collecting all of these disparate parts into a fully functional score. The references to the franchise's main theme remain unsatisfactory despite any joy one might have in their mere existence. The percussion isn't quite as impressive as in Silvestri's two scores (the best main theme performance remains in Predator 2), and the mixing is not quite as expansive as needed for the topic, a problem that plagued Debney's music for the prior film. This one will entertain in parts but won't leave a truly lasting, positive impression."

== Personnel ==
Credits adapted from AllMusic

- Music composed and produced by – Henry Jackman
- Additional music – Alex Belcher, Evan Goldman, Halli Cauthery, Matt Margeson
- Musical assistance – John Paul Lefebvre
- Recording – Alan Meyerson
- Mixing – Alfredo Pasquel, Alan Meyerson
- Mastering – DNA Mastering
- Lacquer cut – Daniel Krieger
- Score editor – Peter 'Oso' Snell, Will Kaplan, Devaughn Watts
- Score engineer – Tim Lauber, Erin Michael Rettig
- Technical engineer – Fabio Marks, Felipe Pacheco, Gage Boozan, Maverick Dugger
- Music supervisor – Dave Jordan, Trygge Toven
- Music co-ordinator – Joann Orgel
- Copyist – BTW Productions Inc., Booker White
- Score recordist – Kevin Globerman

Instruments

- Bass – Christian Kollgaard, David Parmeter, Drew Dembowski, Geoffrey Osika, Michael Valerio, Nico Abondolo, Stephen Dress, Edward Meares
- Bassoon – Kenneth Munday, Patricia Kindel, Rose Corrigan
- Cello – Armen Ksajikian, Cecilia Tsan, Dennis Karmazyn, Eric Byers, Evgeny Tonkha, Jacob Braun, Michael Kaufman, Paula Hochhalter, Simone Vitucci, Timothy Loo, Xiaodan Altenbach, Steve Erdody
- Flute – Donald Foster, Heather Clark, Jenni Olson, Juan Gallegos, Ralph Williams, Geri Rotella, Stuart Clark
- Harp – JoAnn Turovsky
- Horns – Amy Rhine, Dylan Hart, Kaylet Torrez, Laura Brenes, Mark Adams, Mike McCoy, Steve Becknell, Teag Reaves, David Everson
- Keyboards – Randy Kerber
- Oboe – Chris Bleth, Jessica Pearlman, Lara Wickes
- Percussion – Brian Kilgore, Donald Williams, Ted Atkatz, Gregory Goodall, Ken McGrath, Pete Korpela, Wade Culbreath
- Trombone – Andrew Martin, William Reichenbach, Craig Gosnell, Phillip Keen, Steve Suminski, Steven Holtman, Alexander Iles
- Trumpet – Barry Perkins, Robert Schaer, Thomas Hooten, Wayne Bergeron, Jon Lewis
- Tuba – Doug Tornquist
- Viola – Alma Fernandez, Andrew Duckles, Carolyn Riley, David Walther, Zach Dellinger, Jonathan Moerschel, Laura Pearson, Luke Maurer, Matthew Funes, Meredith Crawford, Michael Larco, Shawn Mann, Victor De Almeida, Robert Brophy
- Violin – Alyssa Park, Amy Hershberger, Ana Landauer, Andrew Bulbrook, Benjamin Powell, Benjamin Jacobson, Charlie Bisharat, Eun-Mee Ahn, Grace Oh, Helen Nightengale, Irina Voloshina, Jacqueline Brand, Jessica Guideri, Joel Pargman, Josefina Vergara, Kevin Connolly, Kevin Kumar, Lisa Liu, Luanne Homzy, Marc Sazer, Natalie Leggett, Nathan Cole, Phillip Levy, Rafael Rishik, Roberto Cani, Roger Wilkie, Sarah Thornblade, Shalini Vijayan, Songa Lee, Tammy Hatwan, Yelena Yegoryan, Julie Gigante

Vocals

- Alto Vocals – Adriana Manfredi, Aleta Braxton, Callista Hoffman-Campbell, Eleni Pantages, Jessica Rotter, Jessie Shulman, Laura Smith Roethe, Lesley Leighton, Marijke van Niekerk, Michele Hemmings, Sara Mann
- Bass Vocals – Abdiel Gonzalez, Ben Han-Wei Lin, Chung Uk Lee, Dylan Gentile, James Hayden, Mark Beasom, Mark Edward Smith, Michael Bannett, Michael Miersma, Scott Graff
- Soprano Vocals – Anna Schubert, Beth Peregrine, Claire Fedoruk, Elyse Willis, Holly Sedillos, Karen Hogle Brown, Kelci Hahn, Lika Miyake, Zanaida Robles
- Tenor vocals – A.J. Teshin, Bradley Chapman, Charles Lane, Chris Mann, Gerald White, Jon Lee Keenan, JJ Lopez, Matt Brown, Matthew Tresler, Timothy Gonzales

Orchestra

- Orchestration – Andrew Kinney, Henri Wilkinson, Stephen Coleman
- Orchestra conductor – Ed Trybek, Gavin Greenaway, Stephen Coleman
- Orchestra contractor – Peter Rotter
- Choir conductor and contractor – Jasper Randall
- Concertmaster – Bruce Dukov
- Stage manager – Christine Sirois, Damon Tedesco, Peter Nelson

Management

- Music clearance – Ellen Ginsburg
- Music business affairs – Tom Cavanaugh
- Executive in-charge of music – Danielle Diego
- Music production supervisor – Rebecca Morellato, Johnny Choi
- Executive producer – Brian McNelis, Skip Williamson
- A&R – Eric Craig, John Bergin
- Music production services – Matthew K. Justmann
- Art direction – John Bergin

== Release history ==
Region	Date	Format(s)	Label	Ref.
Various	September 28, 2018	Digital download; streaming	Lakeshore	
Various	October 5, 2018	CD	Lakeshore	
Various	February 1, 2019	Vinyl	Lakeshore	
