= The Predator Holiday Special =

2018 American animated short film

- Official title card
- Directed by: David Brooks; Alex Kamer
- Written by: Matthew Senreich; Matt Motschenbacher
- Based on: Characters by: Jim Thomas; John Thomas
- Produced by: Chris Franchino
- Starring: Dave B. Mitchell; Xander Mobus; Keith Silverstein
- Cinematography: Helder Sun
- Edited by: Clayton Baker
- Production company: Stoopid Buddy Stoodios
- Distributed by: 20th Century Fox Home Entertainment
- Release dates: December 18, 2018; (The Predator DVD, Blu-ray and 4K Ultra HD release); December 19, 2018 (Comedy Central); December 20, 2018 (YouTube)
- Running time: 2 minutes, 15 seconds
- Country: United States

The Predator Holiday Special is a 2018 American stop-motion animated short comedy film based on the Predator franchise. Starring the voices of Dave B. Mitchell, Xander Mobus, and Keith Silverstein, the film follows Santa Claus and his elves and reindeer as they have an encounter with a Predator at the North Pole.

== Plot ==
At the North Pole, elf-worker Sprinkles and security guard reindeer Blitzen are talking about how excited they are for Christmas Eve when a tri-laser sight from a Yautja (Predator) appears on Blitzen's flank. Recognising its indication, Blitzen pushes Sprinkles aside, draws out his signature mini-gun, and opens fire on the treeline, before he is killed by a shot from the unseen Yautja. Fleeing into the surrounding woods, a panicked Sprinkles attempts to radio Prancer and the other reindeer for backup, only to find the skinned corpse of Dasher hanging from a tree, before Sprinkles himself is impaled by the Yautja's wrist-blades.

Having received Sprinkles' call, Prancer and several other heavily armed reindeer head into the woods to find the Yautja, but are ambushed and quickly slain. After decapitating its prey, the Yautja next makes for Santa's cottage. Seeing the creature approach, Santa calls upon his final reindeer, Larry (a John Rambo and Dutch Schaefer-inspired reindeer), who guns the creature down with an M16. Santa and Larry share a congratulatory high-five.

Several more Yautja from the deceased's hunting party suddenly decloak around the fallen hunter's corpse. As a sign of respect for defeating their comrade, the group's leader hands Santa a trophy from a previous hunt — the Easter Bunny's basket, full of Easter eggs. As the Yautja prepare to leave in peace with their fallen brother, they are suddenly all killed by an enraged Sprinkles in a savage acrobatic hand-to-hand brawl.

Sprinkles is crushed by a falling Christmas tree.

Santa and Larry look upon the scene of carnage in shock. One of the eggs in the Easter basket, a Xenomorph egg, opens, shocking Santa.

== Cast ==
- Dave B. Mitchell as Blitzen, Prancer, Larry, and Santa's other reindeer
- Xander Mobus as Sprinkles, one of Santa's elves
- Keith Silverstein as Santa Claus, a legendary Christmas gift-bringer

== Production ==
On December 12, 2018, The Predator Holiday Special was announced alongside the promotional poster, to air during a broadcast of BoJack Horseman. The short was released on December 18, 2018 with the DVD, Blu-ray and 4K Ultra HD release of The Predator, airing on Comedy Central the following day on December 19 in promotion of it, and to the 20th Century Fox YouTube channel the following day to that, on December 20.

In an interview with Entertainment Weekly on December 17, 2018, Matthew Senreich and David Brooks of Stoopid Buddy Stoodios attributed the production of The Predator Holiday Special to "a random hangout moment" they'd had at Comic-Con with 20th Century Fox's vice president of worldwide creative strategy, Matt Motschenbacher, calling the film a "bloody and gory" take on the 1964 Christmas stop motion animated television special Rudolph the Red-Nosed Reindeer, while serving as "a fun homage to Predator in a stop-motion technique [and] turning it 90 degrees on its side".

== Reception ==
The Predator Holiday Special received a universally positive critical reception, by such outlets as Screen Rant, MovieWeb, Slash Film, Cinema Blend, ComingSoon.net, The Playlist, Geek Tyrant, First Showing, and It's A Stampede!.
