= The Conjuring: Last Rites (soundtrack) =

The Conjuring: Last Rites (Original Motion Picture Soundtrack)

Film score by Benjamin Wallfisch
- Released: August 29, 2025
- Recorded: 2025
- Genre: Film score
- Length: 73:01
- Label: WaterTower Music
- Producer: Benjamin Wallfisch

Benjamin Wallfisch chronology
Predator: Killer of Killers (2025)	The Conjuring: Last Rites (2025)	The Woman in Cabin 10 (2025)

The Conjuring: Last Rites (Original Motion Picture Soundtrack) is the film score to the 2025 film The Conjuring: Last Rites, which served as the sequel to The Conjuring: The Devil Made Me Do It (2021) and the ninth installment in The Conjuring Universe. Benjamin Wallfisch composed the film score and was released under the WaterTower Music label on August 29, 2025.

== Background ==
The score was composed by Benjamin Wallfisch, replacing Joseph Bishara who previously composed the music for the first three Conjuring films, as well as for the spin-off films Annabelle (2014) and Annabelle Comes Home (2019). Wallfisch previously composed the Conjuring spin-off film Annabelle: Creation (2017). The soundtrack was released by WaterTower Music on August 29, 2025.

== Track listing ==
No.	Title	Length
1.	"What Are You?"	4:04
2.	"Drive to Hospital"	1:42
3.	"Judy Warren"	3:19
4.	"Last Rites"	2:12
5.	"The Cupboard"	2:33
6.	"Trash Day"	3:00
7.	"Judy and Tony"	1:15
8.	"All of My Favorite People"	2:39
9.	"Proposal"	1:12
10.	"Jack and Nelly"	1:31
11.	"The Tape"	1:58
12.	"Media Frenzy"	1:17
13.	"Apparition"	1:44
14.	"Father Gordon"	3:49
15.	"Gordon's Mission"	1:55
16.	"Funeral"	2:49
17.	"We Don't Run from Fights"	3:02
18.	"I Feel It Too"	3:52
19.	"Lorraine Investigates"	2:48
20.	"It Wasn't Done with Us"	4:50
21.	"Something Feels Different"	4:53
22.	"Possession"	4:20
23.	"Get the Book"	3:33
24.	"You're Not There"	4:13
25.	"The Warren Family"	2:34
26.	"Judy and Tony (End Credits Version)"	1:57
Total length:		73:01

== Reception ==
After Misery gave a negative review of the soundtrack, writing "All the screechy sound effects and composer Benjamin Wallfisch's stock horror music score are also unimaginative and annoying". Oscar Huckle of The Film Meister also gave a negative review, saying "Also lacking polish is Benjamin Wallfisch's completely forgettable score, replacing the excellent Joseph Bishara who composed the music for the previous films".
