= Predator (soundtrack) =

Predator: Original Motion Picture Soundtrack

Soundtrack album by Alan Silvestri
- Released: August 19, 2003 (original release); August 2, 2010 (remastered edition)
- Recorded: 1987
- Genres: Orchestral; Film score
- Length: 69:08
- Labels: Varèse Sarabande; Fox Music; Intrada

Professional ratings
Review scores
Source	Rating
Allmusic	2.5/5 stars

Predator: Original Motion Picture Soundtrack is the official soundtrack album of the 1987 action film Predator. It was composed and conducted by Alan Silvestri, and performed by the Hollywood Studio Symphony. The score is completely orchestral and was released in 2003.

In 2003, Varèse Sarabande and Fox Music released the soundtrack album as part of its limited release CD Club collection; the album also includes Elliot Goldenthal's arrangement of Alfred Newman's 20th Century Fox fanfare, which was used on Alien 3, where the penultimate note of the fanfare freezes and rises in crescendo before abruptly cutting off.

In 2007, Silvestri's themes had been reused in the score of Aliens vs. Predator: Requiem, composed by Brian Tyler.

In 2010, the same year Predators featured an adaptation of Silvestri's score by John Debney, Intrada Records and Fox Music released the album in a 3000-copy limited edition with remastered sound, many cues combined and renamed, and most notably (as with Intrada's release of Basil Poledouris's score for RoboCop) presenting the original end credits music as recorded (the film versions are differently mixed). This release is notable for having sold out within a day.

In 2018, Silvestri's themes had been reused in the score of The Predator, composed by Henry Jackman.

== Track listing ==
=== Original ===
No.	Title	Length
1.	"Twentieth Century Fox Fanfare (Alfred Newman - arrangement by Elliot Goldenthal 1992)"	0:27
2.	"Main Title"	3:51
3.	"Something Else"	3:34
4.	"Cut 'Em Down"	1:56
5.	"Payback Time"	2:09
6.	"The Truck"	4:22
7.	"Jungle Trek"	1:47
8.	"The Girl's Escape"	6:00
9.	"Blaine's Death"	2:47
10.	"He's My Friend"	1:26
11.	"We're All Gonna Die"	3:32
12.	"Building a Trap"	3:02
13.	"The Waiting"	3:27
14.	"The Hunt Is On"	4:51
15.	"Dillon Is Disarmed"	2:07
16.	"Billy Stands Alone"	2:34
17.	"Battle Plans"	9:24
18.	"Wounded Predator"	4:14
19.	"Hand to Hand Combat"	3:12
20.	"Predator's Big Finish"	3:42
21.	"The Rescue and End Credits"	4:44
Total length:		1:13:08

=== Intrada edition ===
No.	Title	Length
1.	"Fox Logo (Alfred Newman/Arranged by Elliot Goldenthal 1992)"	0:26
2.	"Main Title"	3:52
3.	"Something Else / Cut 'Em Down / Payback Time"	7:37
4.	"The Truck"	4:23
5.	"Jungle Trek"	1:48
6.	"Girl's Escape / Blaine's Death"	6:40
7.	"What Happened?"	2:01
8.	"He's My Friend"	1:26
9.	"We're Gonna Die"	3:29
10.	"Building the Trap"	3:06
11.	"The Waiting"	3:27
12.	"Can You See Him?"	4:52
13.	"Dillon's Death"	2:05
14.	"Billy and Predator"	2:32
15.	"Dutch Builds Trap"	9:28
16.	"Predator Injured / Hand to Hand Combat"	7:22
17.	"Predator's Death"	3:43
18.	"The Pick-Up and End Credits"	5:58
Total length:		1:14:15
