= Predator 2 (soundtrack) =

Predator 2: Original Motion Picture Soundtrack

Soundtrack album by Alan Silvestri
- Released: December 13, 1990
- Recorded: 1990
- Studio: Skywalker Symphony Orchestra
- Genre: Soundtrack
- Length: 45:14 (original release), 104:56 (Deluxe Edition)
- Labels: Varèse Sarabande VSD-5302 (original release), VCL-1151 (Deluxe Edition); Fox Music VCL-1151 (Deluxe Edition)

Professional ratings
Review scores
Source	Rating
AllMusic	1.5/5 stars

Predator 2: Original Motion Picture Soundtrack is the official soundtrack album of the 1990 science fiction film Predator 2. It was composed and conducted by Alan Silvestri and performed by the Skywalker Symphony Orchestra. The score is orchestral also mixing classic African instruments and was released on December 13, 1990, via Varèse Sarabande label.

== Track listing ==
1. "Main Title" – 2:46
2. "First Carnage" – 2:34
3. "Tunnel Chase" – 4:53
4. "Truly Dead" – 4:58
5. "Danny Gets It" – 3:18
6. "Rest In Pieces" – 1:35
7. "El Scorpio" – 2:42
8. "This Is History" – 6:28
9. "Swinging Rude Boys" – 2:40
10. "Dem Bones" – 4:28
11. "End Title" – 8:46

=== The Deluxe Edition ===
Varese Sarabande and Fox Music issued a greatly expanded version on December 1, 2014.

Disc 1

1. Welcome to the Jungle (2:52)
2. Chat (2:02)
3. Up On the Roof (3:27)
4. First Carnage (2:35)
5. Feds On the Case (:44)
6. Swinging Rude Boys (5:33)
7. Last Person/Danny Gets It (4:30)
8. Stay Out of My Way (:31)
9. Mystery Dart (1:32)
10. Truly Dead (5:25)
11. Kid Commando (:34)
12. Rest In Pieces (1:36)
13. Subway Predator (5:22)
14. Tunnel Chase (5:17)
15. This Is History (7:11)

Disc 2

1. Meat Locker (3:29)
2. Ugly Mother (3:40)
3. Birds (2:33)
4. The Doctor (3:44)
5. Elevator Shaft (1:45)
6. Dem Bones (4:29)
7. More Than One (2:34)
8. Came So Close/End Credits (9:08)
9. Hardcore Logo (1:26)
10. Danny Gets It (Extended Album Mix) (4:29)
11. Tunnel Chase (Extended Album Mix) (4:20)
12. This Is History (Extended Album Mix) (5:17)
13. Dem Bones (Album Mix) (6:40)
14. Wild Predator Voices (2:11)

== Personnel ==
- Composed By, Conductor, Producer – Alan Silvestri
- Contractor [Orchestra] – Greg Sudmeier, Jeff Beal
- Edited by [Assistant Music Editor] – Jacqueline Tager
- Edited by [Music] – Ken Karman
- Engineer [Assistant] – M.T. Silvia, Tony Eckert
- Engineer [Consulting] – Bob Edwards
- Executive producer – Robert Townson
- Orchestrated By – James B. Campbell
- Other [Executive Assistant] – Tom Null
- Performer – The Skywalker Symphony Orchestra
- Producer [Assistant To] – David Bifano
- Recorded and Mixed by – Dennis S. Sands

℗ © 1990 Twentieth Century Fox
