= J. Kristopher =

American actor

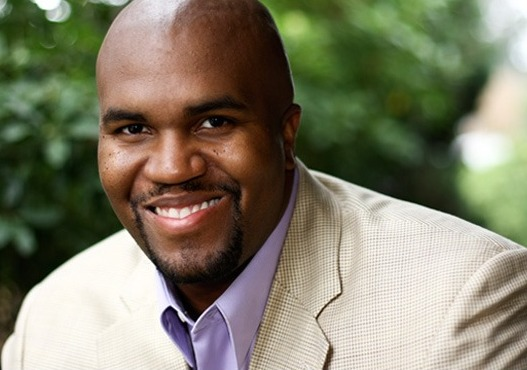
- Born: November 23, 1976; Houston, TX
- Occupation: Actor
- Notable work: Straight Outta Compton, The Rally
- Television: Conan, Parenthood, America's Most Wanted, Days of Our Lives

J Kristopher (born November 23, 1976) is an American film and television actor from Houston, Texas. He is known for his work in the Parenthood and Straight Outta Compton, and is a featured comedic actor in the sketch comedies on Conan.

== Background ==
J Kristopher began his career in Dallas, Texas while attending college at Southern Methodist University. After having a successful run featured in local commercials and theater productions, J Kristopher moved to Los Angeles, California in 2006 to pursue acting full-time; where he landed his first role on the TV series, LA Forensics. His body of work continued to grow.

J Kristopher has gained success on both the big screen including, independent and studio films, plus the small screen, web series, as well as being the face of many national commercial campaigns including: MasterCard, Lowe's, Dancing with the Stars, GMC, Trivial Pursuit, Nickelodeon, VH1, Fox Sports, and Super Bowl print campaign with Target. He played Larry "Laylaw" Goodman in the 2015 biographical film Straight Outta Compton, and often starred in sketch comedy scenes on the talk show Conan. He has over 80 television, film, and commercial credits to his name.

== Filmography ==
=== Television ===
Year	Title	Role	Episode
2007	Miley Cyrus - Start All Over	Dancing Moving Man	Start All Over (music video)
2010	Outlaw	Big Dude	In Re: Curtis Farwell
2010	I Didn't Know I Was Pregnant	Robert	False Positive
2011	America's Most Wanted: America Fights Back	Rapist Laron	US Marshals Turnell Turner
2013	Days of Our Lives	Clerk	Episode #1.12018
2013	NTSF:SD:SUV	Reggie	Inertia
2013	The Crazy Ones	Firefighter	Breakfast Burrito Club
2014	Parenthood	Jim	Happy Birthday, Zeek
2014	The Pete Holmes Show	Security Guard	Jenny Slate

=== Television - Sketch Comedy ===
Conan (Talk Show)
Year	Episodes	Role
2011	As Time Goes Bi-Curious	Porn Andy
2011	Untitled Freddie Prinze Jr. Project	'Myspace' Cop
2011	The Indiscriminate Highlighter	African American Protester
2011	The Bourne Ultimate Frisbee Tournament	Garbage Man
2012	Love Potion Number MGD 64	Officer from Cop Hospital
2012	I've Got 100 Problems, and Yes, Karen Is One of Them	Black Guy in Obama: Too Many High Fives
2013	Texas Chainsaw Seminar: How to Sell Chainsaws from Home!	Security Guard
2013	Kentucky Freud Chicken & the Terrible Psychiatry Joke	Tig Notaro - Secret Service
2013	The Exotic Marigold Hotel 2: Dench Does Dallas	ADT Toilet Security - NATO Soldier
2013	Alien Meets the Fokkers	Andy Richter Reports: Security Guard
2013	One If by Land, Two If by Jetski	Inmate
2013	I Scream, You Scream, We All Scream Because There's a Murderer on the Loose	Security Guard
2013	Agnostic Santa & the Secular Humanist Christmas	Security Guard
2014	Will Arnett/Melissa Rauch/Ryan Hamilton	Park Ranger
2014	Michael Strahan/Famke Janssen/Mark Normand	Security Guard
2014	Daniel Radcliffe/Andrea Martin/The Flaming Lips	Audiencey Awards - Andy
2015	Kristen Stewart/Tig Notaro and Jon Dore/Brian Wilson	Handyman - Peeps PSA
2017	Zachary Levi/John Lydon/Milky Chance	Handyman - Peeps PSA

=== Film ===
Year	Title	Role	Notes
2010	Anger Has A Secret	Lee	
2010	The Rally	Pastor Bob	
2010	Ijé: The Journey	Bald Rapper	
2012	Against the Grain	Joe the custodian	
2014	Wheels	Leroy	
2014	Asian School Girls	Omar	
2015	Radio America	Sam the DJ	
2015	Straight Outta Compton	LayLaw	
2016	Serial Dater	Big Hurt	
