= The Predator (film) =

2018 film by Shane Black

- Theatrical release poster
- Directed by: Shane Black
- Written by: Fred Dekker; Shane Black
- Based on: Characters by: Jim Thomas; John Thomas
- Produced by: John Davis
- Starring: Boyd Holbrook; Trevante Rhodes; Jacob Tremblay; Keegan-Michael Key; Olivia Munn; Thomas Jane; Alfie Allen; Sterling K. Brown
- Cinematography: Larry Fong
- Edited by: Harry B. Miller III; Billy Weber
- Music by: Henry Jackman
- Production companies: 20th Century Fox; Davis Entertainment
- Distributed by: 20th Century Fox
- Release dates: September 6, 2018 (TIFF); September 14, 2018 (United States)
- Running time: 107 minutes
- Country: United States
- Language: English
- Budget: $88 million
- Box office: $160.5 million

The Predator is a 2018 American science fiction action film directed by Shane Black, who co-wrote it with Fred Dekker. It is the fourth installment in the Predator franchise, set between the events of Predator 2 (1990) and Predators (2010). The film stars Boyd Holbrook, Trevante Rhodes, Jacob Tremblay, Keegan-Michael Key, Olivia Munn, Thomas Jane, Alfie Allen, and Sterling K. Brown. It follows a group of PTSD-afflicted soldiers and a scientist who must team up to fight off an invading pair of Predators and discover their plans for humankind.

Development of the film was announced in June 2014, with Black being confirmed as writer and director. Much of the cast signed on between October 2016 and January 2017. Principal photography took place in British Columbia from February to June 2017, with the climax being re-written and re-shot in July 2018 following poor test screenings.

The Predator premiered at the Toronto International Film Festival on September 6, 2018, and was released in the United States on September 14, by 20th Century Fox. The film received generally negative reviews from critics and grossed $160 million against a budget of $88 million. It was followed by a prequel, Prey, released in 2022.

== Plot ==
A Predator ship crash-lands on Earth. U.S. Army Ranger sniper Quinn McKenna and his team are attacked by the Predator while on a hostage retrieval mission. Quinn incapacitates the Predator and has parts of its armor sent off by mail to prove the existence of extraterrestrial life. Government agent Will Traeger has Quinn captured and held for examination. Traeger also takes the Predator to a lab for experimentation and observation, recruiting evolutionary biologist Casey Bracket to study it, who discovers that the Predator's genetic makeup contains human DNA. The Predator awakens, breaks out of its restraints, and kills the lab workers and armed guards, but spares Bracket, after Brackett stripped naked to not be considered a threat, before escaping.

Quinn is bussed off with a group of other captives, including former Marines "Nebraska" Williams, Coyle, Baxley, Lynch, and Army helicopter pilot Nettles. Witnessing the Predator's escape from the lab, they hijack the bus. Taking Bracket with them, they head over to Quinn's estranged wife, Emily, where he expects to find the Predator armor he mailed off. However, Rory, Quinn's autistic son, has gone trick-or-treating in the armor in hopes of avoiding detection from bullies.

Quinn and the others find his son in time to stop a pair of Predator Hounds from ambushing the boy. Quinn blows one up by shooting a grenade into its mouth; Nebraska unintentionally lobotomizes the other dog after shooting it in the head. The Predator chases them into a nearby school and they start to give the Predator's armor back when a larger, more powerful Predator arrives and engages the first in combat. The group flees, and the second Predator kills the first before setting out to retrieve the lost technology.

Bracket concludes that the Predators are attempting to improve themselves with the DNA of humans and, presumably, other planets' inhabitants. She also suggests that Rory's autism enables him to translate and understand Predator technology. The team flees to an abandoned barn, but Traeger finds and captures them, and shares his theory that the Predators anticipate that climate change will end their ability to retrieve human DNA for further hybridization, and as such are scrambling to retrieve samples before it is too late. Seeing Rory drawing a map to the spaceship, Traeger takes the boy to the ship. The team escapes and goes after him with the help of the now docile, brain-damaged Predator hound.

Once all have arrived at the crashed ship, the second Predator arrives, kills Lynch, and explains through translation software that it will destroy the ship to keep it out of their hands and then give them all a head start before it hunts them down. The Predator quickly kills several of Traeger's soldiers while mortally wounding Baxley and Coyle, who then shoot each other. Traeger tries to use a Predator weapon on the alien but accidentally kills himself instead.

The Predator takes Rory, assuming his autism as an advancement in human evolution which makes him a worthwhile subject for hybridization, and flies away in his ship. Quinn, Nebraska, and Nettles land on the ship's exterior, but the Predator activates a force field that slices off Nettles' legs, and he falls off the ship to his death. Nebraska sacrifices himself and slides into the ship's turbine, causing it to crash. Quinn sneaks into the ship as it crashes and attacks the Predator. After the crash, Bracket arrives, and the three manage to overpower and kill the Predator with its weapons. They pay their respects to their fallen comrades with trinkets representing each one before heading off.

Later, Quinn and Rory are seen in a science lab watching the opening of cargo found on the Predator's ship, which a scientist indicates was left behind intentionally. A piece of technology floats out and attaches itself to a lab worker, working as a transformative "Predator killer" suit before deactivating. Realizing the first Predator was trying to pass it on to humanity for a fair fight against the larger Predators, Quinn indicates he will be the pilot to operate the suit.

== Cast ==
- Boyd Holbrook as Quentin "Quinn" McKenna, Emily's estranged husband, the father of Rory and an Army Ranger Captain who discovers the existence of the Predators and leads the battle against them.
- Trevante Rhodes as "Nebraska" Williams, a former Marine officer who joins in a special Predator-hunting operation headed up by Quinn and becomes his closest ally.
- Olivia Munn as Casey Brackett, an evolutionary biologist who joins the crew's mission.
- Jacob Tremblay as Rory McKenna, Quinn and Emily's son, who has a form of autism and is bullied in school, but becomes a key player in the fight against the Predators due to his preternatural ability to learn languages.
- Keegan-Michael Key as Coyle, a Marine veteran, who teams up with Quinn and Williams to fight the Predators.
- Sterling K. Brown as Will Traeger, a government agent and Director of the "Stargazer Project" who jails Quinn, but later needs his help with fighting the Predators.
- Thomas Jane as Baxley, a Marine veteran from the Afghanistan and Iraq wars whose Tourette syndrome causes tics and involuntarily swearing (see Tourette syndrome in film). His character was named after Craig R. Baxley, the stunt coordinator of the 1987 film.
- Alfie Allen as Lynch, a former Marine who teams with several other outsiders, including Quinn, to stop the human-hunting Predators in suburbia.
- Augusto Aguilera as 'Nettles', a former Huey helicopter pilot and religious zealot who has suffered a traumatic brain injury from a crash.
- Jake Busey as Sean Keyes, a head Stargazer scientist, the son of Peter Keyes (played by Busey's father Gary Busey in Predator 2).
- Yvonne Strahovski as Emily McKenna, Quinn's estranged wife and the mother to Rory.

Other cast members in smaller roles include R. J. Fetherstonhaugh as Agent Church, Peter Shinkoda as Dr. Yamada, Lochlyn Munro as Lieutenant General Marks, Nikolas Dukic as Derek, Gabriel LaBelle as E.J., Niall Matter as Sapir, Mike Dopud as Dupree, and Garry Chalk as a postal worker. The Predators were portrayed in-suit and via motion capture by stuntmen Brian A. Prince and Kyle Strauts, with vocal work by Brian A. Prince.

Françoise Yip has a brief, non-speaking role (credited as ‘Tracking Supervisor’), after previously playing Ms. Yutani in Aliens vs. Predator: Requiem. Stuntwoman Breanna Watkins, in scenes that were filmed but not used, portrayed Ellen Ripley in one alternate ending, and an adult Rebecca "Newt" Jorden in a second alternate ending, meant to tie in to the Alien franchise in which those characters first appeared and set up an Alien vs. Predator-focused sequel film, depicted as having travelled back in time as the "Predator Killer". Edward James Olmos had a supporting role as General Woodhurst, but his scenes were cut due to time constraints.

== Production ==
=== Pre-production ===
In June 2014, 20th Century Fox announced a sequel in the Predator franchise, with Shane Black—who starred as supporting character Rick Hawkins in Predator (1987)—directing and co-writing with Fred Dekker, while John Davis produces. Davis said he thinks the film is fresh and reimagines the franchise in a "different, interesting way". In February 2016, Black stated that the title of the sequel would be The Predator. He has referred to the project as an event film which aims to elevate the Predator series: "It's an attempt to 'event-ise' the Predator again... [An attempt to] make it more mysterious." Black also expressed that the film would mark a return to the "intimate" scale of the original film and that the filmmakers hoped to achieve “the same sense of wonderment and newness that Close Encounters had when that came out.”

The film is set in the present day and the titular character has upgraded armor. Black confirmed that the film takes place between the events of the second and third films. Jake Busey was cast as Sean Keyes, the son of Peter Keyes (a character who was portrayed by Busey's father Gary Busey in Predator 2). In February 2016, the studio revealed a teaser image of the film, confirming the title The Predator.

Chief-executive-officer of Fox Stacey Snider shared her thoughts on The Predator, particularly Black and Dekker's script:

We've got a Predator film coming out that is unexpected and utterly fresh. I just imagined that it would take 500 hours to read the script—that it would be interior jungle, exterior more jungle and then fighting happens, but Emma [Watts] went out and recruited Shane Black. From the first page, it didn't read like a Predator film. It's set in suburbia. There's a little boy and his dad at the center of the action.

=== Casting ===
Arnold Schwarzenegger talked with Black about reprising his role as Dutch Schaefer from the first Predator film, but declined the cameo due to the short role. Rapper 50 Cent also spoke of the possibility of being involved in the film but ended up dropping out. By September 2016, Benicio del Toro had signed on to star. The following month, Boyd Holbrook replaced del Toro, who departed due to scheduling issues. In November 2016, Olivia Munn joined the cast. In January 2017, Trevante Rhodes, Keegan-Michael Key, Sterling K. Brown, Thomas Jane and Jacob Tremblay joined the cast. In February, Alfie Allen and Yvonne Strahovski were added. In March, the last main role was filled by Augusto Aguilera while Jake Busey was also cast in a supporting role.

In March 2017, Edward James Olmos was cast as Sanchez, a military general.

=== Filming ===
Filming was scheduled to begin in February 2017 in Vancouver, British Columbia. On November 21, 2016, Larry Fong was confirmed hired as cinematographer for the film. Black announced that filming had begun on February 20, 2017. Additional photography in Vancouver took place in March 2018.

=== Post-production ===
The visual effects were provided by Moving Picture Company, Atomic Fiction, Raynault VFX, Rising Sun Pictures and Proof.

=== Reshoots ===
Fox had an early cut of the film screened to test audiences, in reaction to which the studio ordered the entire third act of the film undergo reshoots. During production in Vancouver in 2017, reports indicated that the set experienced low morale, and the film underwent multiple delays and reshoots. Black stated the original ending was deemed to be too complicated, so the ending was reshot become more streamlined, as well as to take place at night instead of during the day to make the Predator seem scarier. In August 2018, Olmos announced that his role had been cut from the final film, to reduce the film's running time, as his character was deemed not integral to the plot. According to Keegan-Michael Key, approximately three quarters of the script for the final act was rewritten. Exposition about the "Project Stargazer" military initiative studying the Predators was cut, while easter egg references to Predator (1987) and Predator 2 (1990) were added. Françoise Yip who had previously portrayed Mrs. Yutani in Aliens vs. Predator: Requiem (2007) was cast to reprise her role, however her lines were cut and she was recredited "Tracking Supervisor".

Taking place at a military base identified as Area 52, which had been established to defend Earth from Predators and armed with Predator technology, the original ending of The Predator featured the human characters working with two human allied "Emissary Predators" who had come to Earth to help humanity prepare for an alien invasion. The finale included a menagerie of hybrid Predator creatures created through DNA splicing experiments, including Spider Predators and other failed experiments, released by the Upgrade Predator and attacking a military convoy and resulting in multiple character deaths, and featured the human-allied Predators on an APC battling the mutant hybrids. The ending featured multiple limbed and tentacled Predator hybrids, which were defeated when the heroes activate self destruct collars. The sequence ended with the characters flying away in the Predator ship instead of it being blown up, before a subsequent fight at the Upgrade Predator's crashed spacecraft. Reshoots changed much of this, removing the friendly Predators and hybrids, altering key deaths, and moving the final showdown with the Upgrade Predator to instead take place in the woods at night.

As the original finale of the film had the Predators "Ark" cargo pod containing the mutant hybrids, the contents of the container had to be reshot for the ending. Two alternate endings were filmed featuring actress Breanna Watkins portraying first the character Ellen Ripley then the character Newt from Aliens (1986), both of which had their faces hidden under facehugger like masks. These were substituted with the Predator Killer armour, an exo-suit designed to allow humans to fight Predators.

Black and Dekker noted that the film’s original screenplay attempted a complex blend of genres, but the production challenges caused by reshoots resulted in tonal inconsistencies in the script when combining elements of horror, action, comedy, and family melodrama. Black has expressed his desire for the original cut to be released on home video as an alternate directors cut.

== Music ==
Henry Jackman provided the musical score for the film, which incorporates Alan Silvestri's themes from the 1987 film. The film's soundtrack album was released by Lakeshore Records on September 28, 2018.

== Release ==
=== Theatrical ===
The Predator was originally scheduled by Fox for a release date of March 2, 2018, until the date was moved to February 9, 2018. It was then delayed to August 3, 2018. In February 2018, the released date was delayed to September 14, 2018. On May 10, 2018, the first trailer was released. A television spot was released on June 9, while a second full trailer was released on June 26, 2018. The third and final theatrical trailer was released on August 31, 2018, featuring the song "One Shot, One Kill" by Jon Connor featuring Snoop Dogg. The film's world premiere was at the Toronto International Film Festival on September 6, 2018, at the Ryerson Theatre. The film was later released in the US on September 14, 2018.

=== Home media ===
The Predator was released on DVD, Blu-ray and 4K Ultra HD formats on December 18, 2018, in America, alongside short film The Predator: Holiday Special, in which Santa Claus and his elves and reindeer encounter a Predator at the North Pole. The film would eventually be released on DVD, Blu-ray and 4K Ultra HD formats on December 18, 2018, in the United Kingdom.

The film's third act was originally set during the day; after the resulting sequences were deemed ineffective, they were largely reshot at night. Black wanted the home media release to include both versions of the film, Predator AM and Predator PM, but the studio declined, not wanting to pay to complete the daylight version's digital effects.

== Reception ==
=== Box office ===
The Predator grossed $51 million in the United States and Canada, and $109.5 million in other territories, for a total worldwide gross of $160.5 million, against a production budget of $88 million. It ranked the fourth-highest-grossing film behind Predators, the original Predator and Alien vs. Predator, at the domestic box office.

In the United States and Canada, The Predator was released alongside White Boy Rick, A Simple Favor and Unbroken: Path to Redemption, and was projected to gross $25–32 million from 4,037 theaters in its opening weekend. It made $10.5 million on its first day, including $2.5 million from Thursday night previews. It went on to debut to $24 million, finishing first at the box office but marking a lower start than the 2010 film ($24.8 million). It dropped 65% in its second weekend to $8.7 million, finishing fourth. In its third weekend the film grossed $3.9 million, finishing eighth.

=== Critical response ===
On the review aggregator website Rotten Tomatoes, 34% of 296 critics' reviews are positive, with an average rating of 5.0/10. The website's consensus reads: "The Predator has violence and quips to spare, but its chaotically hollow action adds up to another missed opportunity for a franchise increasingly defined by disappointment." Metacritic, which uses a weighted average, assigned the film a score of 48 out of 100, based on 49 critics, indicating "mixed or average" reviews. Audiences polled by CinemaScore gave the film an average grade of C+ on an A+ to F scale, those on PostTrak gave it a 66% positive score and a 55% "definite recommend", and social media monitor RelishMix noted there were "mixed reactions" about the film online.

Writing for The Hollywood Reporter, Jordan Mintzer called the film "bigger, meaner, gorier, funnier" than previous installments, writing, "Whether the world actually needs [a sequel], and whether this reboot was necessary at all, is probably a question worth raising, but at least Black's take on it is to never take it too seriously while keeping us duly entertained." Brian Tallerico of RogerEbert.com praised the ensemble, pacing and Black's direction, writing, "Black is assisted greatly by an incredibly charismatic cast, and he knows how to use them to amplify their strengths." A. A. Dowd of The A.V. Club wrote "The Predator, which Black penned with Monster Squad co-writer and director Fred Dekker, makes a few concessions to modern blockbuster filmmaking, including an overabundance of CGI, a blatantly franchise-thirsty ending, and some winking references to the original. But the movie's values are more 1988 than 2018, and that's what makes it fun, at least in spurts: Black has captured the spirit of that bygone era of adrenaline-junkie junk without getting all retro-fussy about it." He graded the film a B−.

In a negative review, Dennis Harvey of Variety called it "an exhaustingly energetic mess in which a coherent plot and credible characters aren't even on the cluttered menu". Writing for Nerdist, Katie Walsh called the film "messy, chaotic, and convoluted", adding that its "comedy and action are at war with each other. Characters spew rat-a-tat quips, while tussling with Predators and their pets, essentially neutralizing the effect of both the humor and the action." Jonathan Barkan, writing for Dread Central, gave the film two out of five stars, saying, "Poor story choices and strange, if not outright silly, character decisions result in an experience that will ultimately leave audiences feeling a great amount of 'meh'." Jim Vejvoda of IGN gave the film a 6.5 out of 10, saying, "The Predator does a lot right to reinvigorate the 31-year-old series. But everything crashes down during its frenzied, messy final act, a disappointing conclusion to what had largely been a fun romp up until that point."

=== Cast and crew response ===
In 2020, Holbrook looked back on the underperformance of The Predator and what he learned from the experience: "I just think the first one [Predator] caught lightning in a bottle [... and] with people wanting to do more, maybe you should just let a sleeping dog lie, sometimes."

In 2022, Black blamed himself for the film's failure: “I’m not going to take the road of blaming anyone—including the studio—for a failed movie. We tried something different. In retrospect—talking of finger on the pulse—I guess we just didn’t have that finger.”

=== Controversies ===
Black hired his longtime friend Steven Wilder Striegel (known professionally as "Steve Wilder") for a minor, un-auditioned role in The Predator, in which his character repeatedly tries to flirt with Bracket (who rebuffs him), played by Munn. Wilder has been a registered felony sex offender since 2010, when he pleaded guilty to "enticing a minor by computer" after he attempted to lure a 14-year-old girl into a sexual relationship via email. A few days before picture lock on the film, Munn became aware of Wilder's history and approached Fox executives, insisting that the scene be removed.

Black defended his casting decision and his friend, until later issuing a public apology and rescinding those comments during backlash. Fox released a statement saying that they were unaware of Wilder's status and confirming that the scene had been cut from the film. Co-star Sterling K. Brown tweeted in support of Munn, but initially, most other actors on the film remained silent, releasing statements after mounting public pressure.

The Predator also suggests not only that autistic persons who exhibit savant qualities and other forms of neurodiversity are or were advantageous, but that they represent a forward step on the human evolutionary path. According to the scientific opinions reported by Syfy Wire, such a thesis would have some issues. A New York Post review ends by stating: "But worse is a plot line involving autism and a dubious scientific theory that will leave parents fuming." In a review for Uproxx, Emma Stefansky called the film's depiction of autism "maybe the worst thing I have seen in a film this year" and scolds the filmmakers for their depiction of these issues, especially the idea that "autism = really smart".

== Franchise ==
=== Sequel ===
Davis said that The Predator would set up two direct sequels that he hoped Black would return to direct. Concerning this, Black stated that "I would love to say we've been planning a trilogy, but I take one day at a time, in motion-picture terms that's one movie at a time." With the sale of 21st Century Fox's assets, including 20th Century Fox, to the Walt Disney Company the future of the series was called into question, though Disney's then-CEO Bob Iger confirmed that certain properties would remain R-rated.

The latest entry, Predator: Badlands, was released in theaters on November 7, 2025.

=== Prequel ===
In December 2019, Dan Trachtenberg was announced to be developing a film under the working title of Skulls, with a script from Patrick Aison, set during the American Civil War and following "a Comanche woman who goes against gender norms and traditions to become a warrior". In November 2020, it was revealed that the project would actually be a fifth film in the Predator franchise. Trachtenberg indicated that he had been working on the film since 2016, while the original intention was to market the project without any references to Predator. The Walt Disney Company produced the project through their 20th Century Studios banner.

In May 2021, Amber Midthunder was cast in the lead role of Naru in the film, officially titled Prey, which began filming in June. Prey premiered at San Diego Comic-Con on July 21, 2022.

== Other media ==
=== Video game ===
The video game Predator: Hunting Grounds continues the narrative of The Predator, with Jake Busey reprising his role as Sean Keyes from the film.

=== Novelizations ===
The Predator received a novelization co-written by Christopher Golden and Mark Morris, with the audiobook narrated by James Patrick Cronin. It also received a prequel novel titled The Predator: Hunters and Hunted written by James A. Moore, the audiobook also narrated by Cronin.

=== Comic book ===
A cross issue titled Archie vs. Predator II features an appearance of the Predator Hounds portrayed in The Predator.

== See also ==
- List of monster movies
