= Dan Trachtenberg =

American filmmaker and podcast host (born 1981)

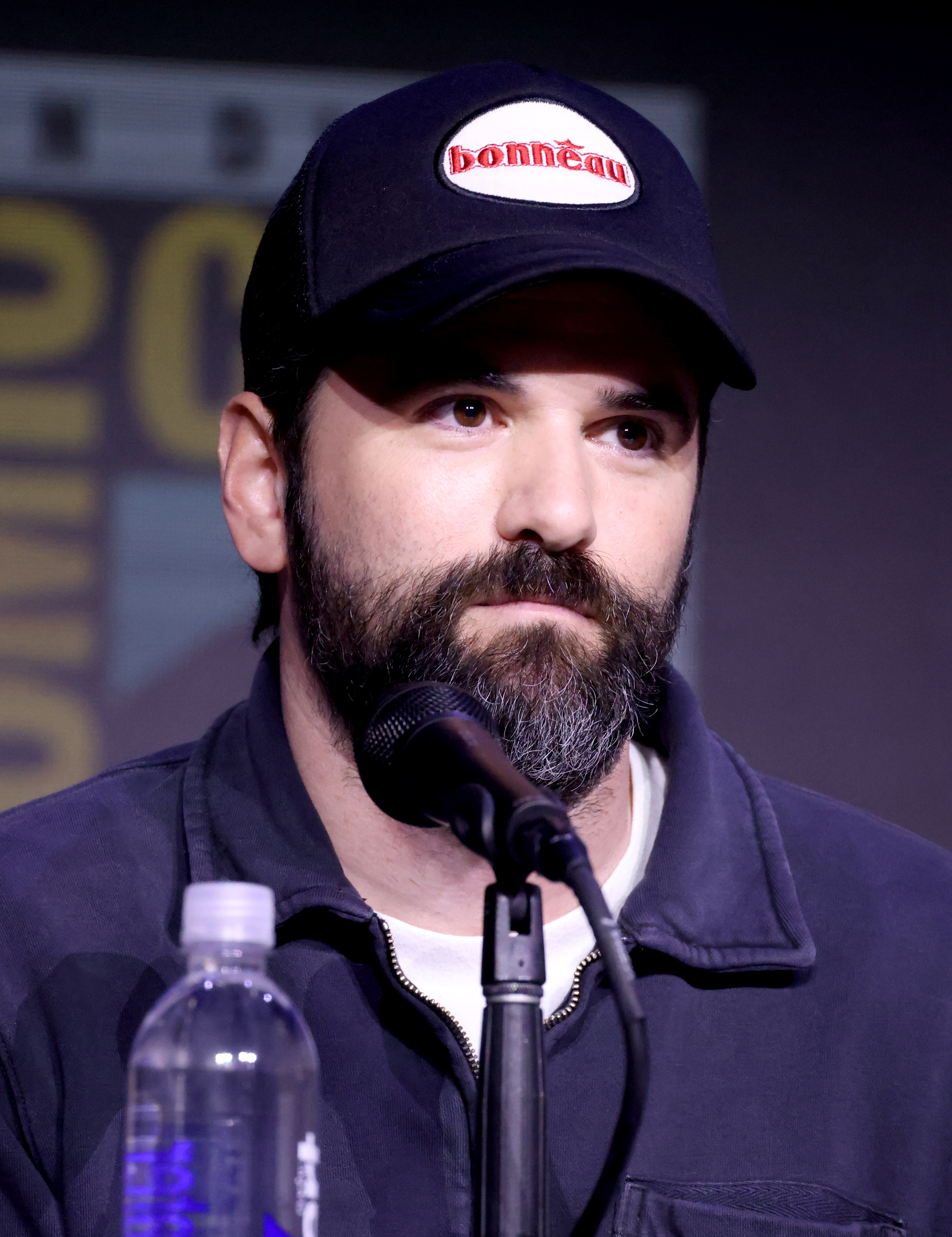
- Trachtenberg at the 2025 San Diego Comic-Con
- Born: May 11, 1981 (age 45); Philadelphia, Pennsylvania, U.S.
- Education: Temple University
- Occupations: Director, writer, producer, podcast host
- Years active: 1998–present
- Spouse: Priscilla Hernandez (m. 2011)
- Children: 1
- Website: dantrachtenberg.com

Dan Trachtenberg (born May 11, 1981) is an American filmmaker and podcast host. He made his feature film debut with 10 Cloverfield Lane (2016), earning him a Directors Guild of America Award nomination for Outstanding Directing – First-Time Feature Film. He went on to direct and provide the story for the Predator franchise films Prey (2022), Predator: Killer of Killers (2025), and Predator: Badlands (2025). For television, he directed the pilot episodes of The Boys (2019) and The Lost Symbol (2021), as well as episodes of Black Mirror (2016).

Trachtenberg was one of three hosts of The Totally Rad Show podcast and a former co-host of the Geekdrome podcast. He also directed episodes for the Ctrl+Alt+Chicken podcast. All three programs were hosted at Revision3.

== Early life and education ==
Trachtenberg grew up in the Willow Grove/Upper Moreland area of Philadelphia, Pennsylvania. He is Jewish. He has an older brother who is a film editor.

Trachtenberg's parents instilled in him a love of movies and fostered their son's artistic ambitions. When he was three years old, his mother helped him make a Star Wars video using action figures, toys, and kitchen utensils. Unable to see PG or R-rated movies as a child, Trachtenberg would imagine the films in his mind. He would also read novelizations of films and buy film soundtracks. His parents also hired an art student to teach him how to draw comics.

He attended Cheltenham High School. One teacher would host movie nights which was influential in making Trachtenberg a film buff. During his high school years, he worked a video store at the Willow Grove Park Mall and took screenwriting and directing classes on weekends at the University of the Arts.

Trachtenberg majored in film, graduated from Temple University in 2003.

== Career ==
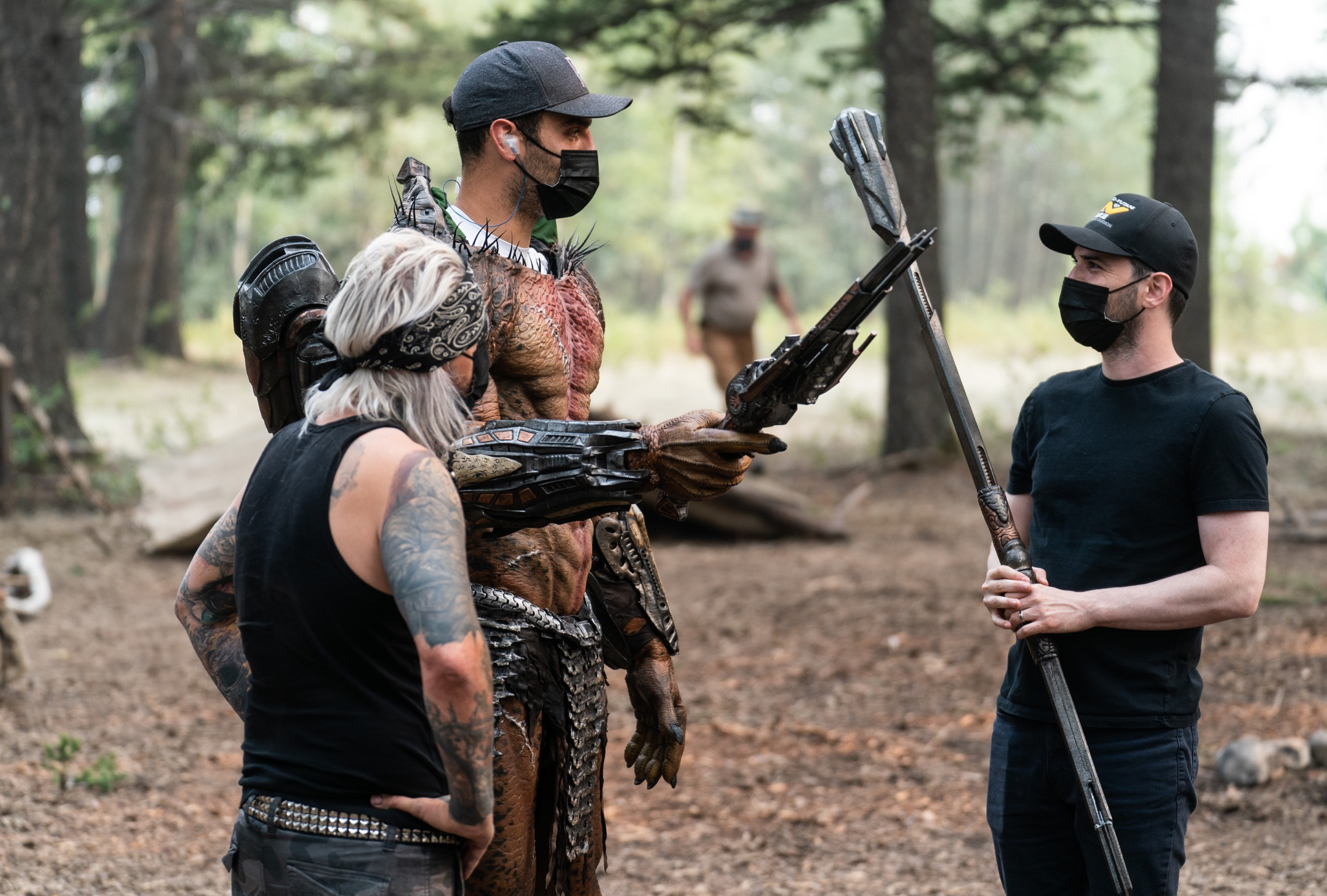
Dane DiLiegro and Dan Trachtenberg discuss a scene while shooting Prey (2022).

Trachtenberg has directed commercials for Lexus, Nike, and Coca-Cola. In 2003, he directed the short film Kickin'. In April 2008, he joined Tight Films, for which he collaborated with Matt Wolf on an alternate reality game for Hellboy II: The Golden Army.

He directed the internet show, Ctrl+Alt+Chicken.

In March 2011, Trachtenberg released a short film for BlackBoxTV titled More Than You Can Chew, starring J. Kristopher, Skye Marshall and Ian Hamrick. Trachtenberg co-wrote the story with Mark D. Walker.

On August 23, 2011, Trachtenberg released the short film Portal: No Escape, based on the video game Portal, which has since garnered more than twenty-eight million views on YouTube.

On October 13, 2011, /Film announced that Trachtenberg would be directing a science fiction action heist film for Universal Pictures with writer Chris Morgan.

In January 2013, iFanboy broke the news that Trachtenberg would direct the film adaptation of Y: The Last Man. However, on September 25, 2014, /Film announced that the film had been cancelled.

On April 3, 2014, Ain't It Cool News announced that Trachtenberg would direct a film for Bad Robot titled Valencia, which was later revealed to be a code name for 10 Cloverfield Lane.

On April 30, 2018, it was announced that Dan Trachtenberg would direct the first episode of the Amazon series The Boys, replacing Seth Rogen and Evan Goldberg who dropped out due to scheduling conflicts.

On January 14, 2019, Trachtenberg was announced to be directing a live action film adaptation of the video game series Uncharted. However on August 22, 2019, it was announced he had exited the film.

On November 20, 2020, it was announced that Trachtenberg had been engaged by 20th Century Studios to direct the fifth installment in the Predator film series, titled Prey. For his work on the film, Trachtenberg received two nominations at the 75th Primetime Emmy Awards. It was reported in February 2024 that Trachtenberg was developing a new film in the Predator franchise separate from his film Prey. The film, Predator: Badlands began filming by August 2024 and was released in November 2025. In October 2024, it was revealed the Trachtenberg developed an animated Predator film in secret during production of Badlands. The film, Predator: Killer of Killers, was released in June 2025.

On June 28, 2023, it was announced that Trachtenberg would direct at least one episode in the final season of the Netflix series Stranger Things. However, conflicts due to the production Predator: Badlands and the 2023 Writers Guild of America strike meant that another director took his place. Stranger Things creators the Duffer Brothers cameo in Predator: Badlands. Most recently, he had signed a deal with Paramount Pictures. In June 2026, it was announced that Trachtenberg would co-direct a film adaptation of the indie comic Freddy the 13th alongside the comic's author, Yehudi Mercado.

== Personal life ==
He married Priscilla Hernandez in 2011. He has a daughter, born in 2016.

== Filmography ==
Feature film

Year	Title	Director	Story	Producer
2016	10 Cloverfield Lane	Yes	No	No
2022	Prey	Yes	Yes	No
2025	Predator: Killer of Killers	Yes	Yes	Yes
2025	Predator: Badlands	Yes	Yes	Yes

Short film

Year	Title	Director	Writer
2003	Kickin'	Yes	Yes
2011	Portal: No Escape	Yes	Uncredited
2019	Warframe	Yes	No

Television

Year	Title	Director	Executive Producer	Episode
2011	BlackBoxTV Presents	Yes	No	"More Than You Can Chew" (Also story writer)
2016	Black Mirror	Yes	No	"Playtest"
2019	The Boys	Yes	Yes	"The Name of the Game"
2021	The Lost Symbol	Yes	Yes	"As Above, So Below"

== Awards and nominations ==
Year	Award	Category	Title	Result	Ref.
2017	Directors Guild of America Awards	Outstanding Directorial Achievement in First-Time Feature Film	10 Cloverfield Lane	Nominated	
2017	Hawaii Film Critics Society Awards	Best New Filmmaker	10 Cloverfield Lane	Won	
2017	Online Film & Television Association Awards	Best Feature Debut	10 Cloverfield Lane	Nominated	
2023	Primetime Emmy Awards	Outstanding Directing for a Limited or Anthology Series or Movie	Prey	Nominated	
2023	Primetime Emmy Awards	Outstanding Writing for a Limited or Anthology Series or Movie	Prey	Nominated	
