= Fox Music =

In-name only sub-label of Hollywood Records

- Parent company: Disney Music Group
- Founded: November 10, 1992; 33 years ago (as Fox Records)
- Defunct: January 17, 2020; 6 years ago
- Status: Folded into Disney Music Group (20th Century Studios' soundtrack releases currently under Hollywood Records)
- Distributor: Universal Music Group
- Genre: Various
- Country of origin: California, United States
- Location: Century City, California, United States

Fox Music was the music division label of 20th Century Fox. It encompassed music publishing and licensing businesses, dealing primarily with television and film soundtracks. It was located in Century City, California.

During CEO Robert Kraft's tenure at Fox, dozens of Fox scores and soundtracks have become platinum or gold records. Highlights include the soundtracks from 20th Century Fox and Fox Searchlight Pictures films such as Titanic, Waiting to Exhale, 28 Weeks Later, Moulin Rouge!, Garden State, Romeo + Juliet, The Full Monty, Hope Floats, Dr. Dolittle, Bulworth, Anastasia, Walk the Line, Alvin and the Chipmunks, Once, Juno, and Ferdinand.

Fox Music has also supervised the music for 20th Century Fox Television and Fox Television Studios hits, starting in 1994. Such television soundtracks from Fox Music have included the worldwide platinum albums from Ally McBeal and The X-Files, plus hit compilations from The Simpsons, Family Guy, Futurama, American Dad!, King of the Hill, Bob's Burgers, Buffy the Vampire Slayer, Dark Angel, Roswell, Glee, It's Always Sunny in Philadelphia, 24, Malcolm in the Middle, and Sons of Anarchy.

Since Kraft became chief executive in 1994, Fox Music has been responsible for the worldwide sales of over 60 million albums, producing 3 Platinum, 6 Multi-Platinum and 6 Gold records. Fox Music has garnered 10 Academy Award nominations, winning 4 Academy Awards, 14 Golden Globe nominations (including 4 Golden Globe Awards), 58 Emmy nominations with 11 wins, and 46 Grammy nominations including 12 Grammy Awards.

Fox Music used to utilize unaffiliated record companies for distribution. For example, Glee Cast albums were released by Columbia Records. Such recordings were released under the 20th Century Fox TV Records imprint which was introduced in 2009 as a joint venture of 20th Century Fox and Sony Music.

Following the acquisition of 21st Century Fox by Disney in 2019, Fox Music became part of the Disney Music Group and was distributed by Universal Music Group. In 2020, due to Disney dropping the "Fox" brand, Fox Music was folded into Disney Music Group. Now, all of the renamed 20th Century Studios and Searchlight Pictures are released under DMG's Hollywood Records label, and Fox Music is only used as a legal name for 20th Century Studios and Searchlight Pictures' soundtrack labels before Disney's acquisition.
