= David Cronenberg filmography =

List of moving image media productions by David Cronenberg

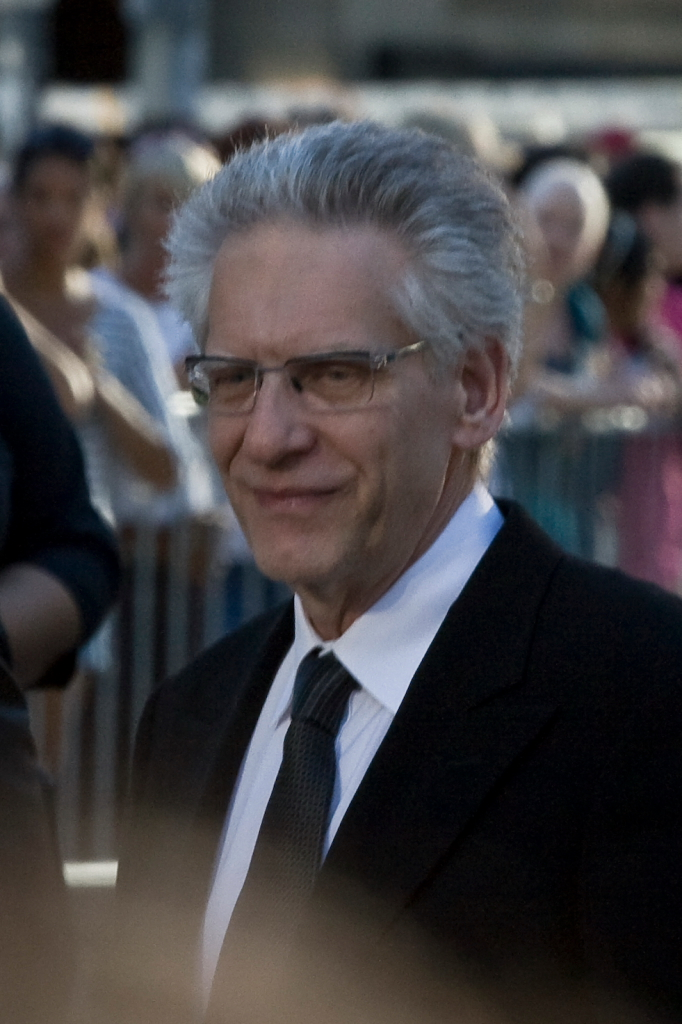
David Cronenberg at the Cannes Film Festival in 2011

David Cronenberg is a Canadian film director, screenwriter, and actor. He is known as a principal originator of the genre commonly known as body horror, with his films exploring visceral bodily transformation, infectious diseases, and the intertwining of the psychological, physical, and technological. Cronenberg is best known for exploring these themes through sci-fi horror films such as Shivers (1975), Scanners (1981), Videodrome (1983) and The Fly (1986), though he has also directed dramas, psychological thrillers and gangster films.

He also directed the psychological thriller Dead Ringers (1988), the surrealist drama Naked Lunch (1991), erotic thriller Crash (1996), the action thriller A History of Violence (2005), the gangster film Eastern Promises (2007), the erotic historical drama A Dangerous Method (2011), the drama Cosmopolis (2012), the satirical drama Maps to the Stars (2014), and the science fiction horror film Crimes of the Future (2022). Six of his films were selected to compete for the Palme d'Or. He is known for frequently collaborating with actor Viggo Mortensen.

== Film ==
Year	Title	Credited as					Notes	Ref(s)
Year	Title	Director	Writer	Producer	Editor	Cinematographer	Notes	Ref(s)
1969	Stereo	Yes	Yes	Yes	Yes	Yes		
1970	Crimes of the Future	Yes	Yes	Yes	Yes	Yes		
1975	Shivers	Yes	Yes	No	No	No		
1977	Rabid	Yes	Yes	No	No	No		
1979	Fast Company	Yes	Yes	No	No	No		
1979	The Brood	Yes	Yes	No	No	No		
1981	Scanners	Yes	Yes	No	No	No		
1983	Videodrome	Yes	Yes	No	No	No		
1983	The Dead Zone	Yes	No	No	No	No	From Stephen King's 1979 novel	
1986	The Fly	Yes	Yes	No	No	No	Remake of Kurt Neumann's 1958 film	
1988	Dead Ringers	Yes	Yes	Yes	No	No		
1991	Naked Lunch	Yes	Yes	No	No	No	Partly adapted from William S. Burroughs's 1959 novel and biographical sources	
1993	M. Butterfly	Yes	No	No	No	No		
1996	Crash	Yes	Yes	Yes	No	No	From J. G. Ballard's 1973 novel	
1999	Existenz	Yes	Yes	Yes	No	No		
2002	Spider	Yes	No	Yes	No	No		
2005	A History of Violence	Yes	No	No	No	No		
2007	Eastern Promises	Yes	No	No	No	No		
2011	A Dangerous Method	Yes	No	No	No	No		
2012	Cosmopolis	Yes	Yes	Yes	No	No	From Don DeLillo's 2003 Novel	
2014	Maps to the Stars	Yes	No	No	No	No		
2022	Crimes of the Future	Yes	Yes	No	No	No		
2024	The Shrouds	Yes	Yes	No	No	No		

=== Acting roles ===
Year	Title	Role	Notes	Ref(s)
1967	Black Zero	Nude scene	Uncredited	
1975	Shivers	Infected Crowd Member	Uncredited	
1983	Videodrome	Max Renn (Helmet Scenes)	Uncredited	
1985	Into the Night	Ed's supervisor in the boardroom	Cameo	
1986	The Fly	Gynecologist in the dream sequence	Cameo	
1988	Dead Ringers	Obstetrician	Uncredited cameo	
1990	Nightbreed	Dr. Philip K. Decker		
1992	Blue			
1994	Trial by Jury	Director		
1994	Boozecan	Stan Coleburn		
1994	Henry & Verlin	Doc Fisher		
1995	To Die For	Man at the Lake	Cameo	
1995	Blood and Donuts	Crime Boss		
1996	The Stupids	Postal supervisor	Cameo	
1996	Extreme Measures	Hospital Lawyer		
1998	Last Night	Duncan		
1998	The Grace of God	Psychiatrist		
1999	Resurrection	Father Rousell		
2002	Jason X	Dr. Wimmer		
2010	Barney's Version	O'Malley Director No. 2	Cameo	
2020	Disappearance at Clifton Hill	Walter		
2020	Falling	Proctologist		
2026	Ready or Not 2: Here I Come	Mr. Chester Danforth		

=== Short films ===
Year	Title	Director	Writer	Producer	Notes	Ref.
1966	Transfer	Yes	Yes	Yes	Also editor and cinematographer	
1967	From the Drain	Yes	Yes	No	Also editor and cinematographer	
2000	Camera	Yes	Yes	No	Made for the 2000 Toronto International Film Festival's Preludes program	
2007	At the Suicide of the Last Jew in the World in the Last Cinema in the World	Yes	No	No	Also actor, segment of anthology To Each His Own Cinema (Chacun son cinéma)	
2013	The Nest	Yes	No	No		
2021	The Death of David Cronenberg	Yes	Yes	No	Co-directed by Caitlin Cronenberg	
2023	Four Unloved Women, Adrift on a Purposeless Sea, Experience the Ecstasy of Dissection	Yes	No	No		

== Television ==
=== TV films ===
Year	Title	Credited as					Notes	Ref(s)
Year	Title	Director	Writer	Producer	Editor	Cinematographer	Notes	Ref(s)
1971	Jim Ritchie Sculptor	Yes	Yes	Yes	Yes	Yes	Documentary short	
1971	Letter from Michelangelo	Yes	Yes	Yes	Yes	Yes	Documentary short	
1971	Tourettes	Yes	Yes	Yes	Yes	Yes	Documentary short	
1972	Don Valley	Yes	Yes	Yes	Yes	Yes	Documentary short	
1972	Fort York	Yes	Yes	Yes	Yes	Yes	Documentary short	
1972	Lakeshore	Yes	Yes	Yes	Yes	Yes	Documentary short	
1972	Winter Garden	Yes	Yes	Yes	Yes	Yes	Documentary short	
1972	Scarborough Bluffs	Yes	Yes	Yes	Yes	Yes	Documentary short	
1972	In the Dirt	Yes	Yes	Yes	Yes	Yes	Documentary short	

=== TV series ===
Year	Title	Director	Writer	Episodes	Ref.
1972	Program X	Yes	No	"Secret Weapons" and "Nothing to Declare"	
1976	Peep Show	Yes	No	"The Victim" and "The Lie Chair"	
1976	Teleplay	Yes	Yes	"The Italian Machine"	
1988	Friday the 13th: The Series	Yes	No	"Faith Healer"	
1991	Scales of Justice	Yes	No	"Regina vs Horvath" and "Regina vs Logan"	

=== Acting roles ===
Year	Title	Role	Note	Ref.
1997	The Newsroom	Himself	Episode "Meltdown: Part 1"	
2003	Alias	Dr. Brezzel	2 episodes	
2013	Rewind	Benjamin Rourke	TV movie	
2017	Pig Goat Banana Cricket	Dr. Cronenbird (Voice)	Episode "The Goofy Turkey Zone"	
2019	Disappearance at Clifton Hill	Walter Bell		
2019	Alias Grace	Reverend Verringer	4 episodes	
2020–2024	Star Trek: Discovery	Dr. Kovich / Agent Daniels	Recurring role, 8 episodes	
2021	Slasher	Spencer Galloway	Main role (season 4)	

== Commercials ==
Titles	Client	Product	Agency	Production company	Ref.
Hot Showers	Ontario Hydro	Energy conservation	Burghardt Wolowich Crunkhorn	The Partners' Film Company Ltd.	
Laundry	Ontario Hydro	Energy conservation	Burghardt Wolowich Crunkhorn	The Partners' Film Company Ltd.	
Cleaners	Ontario Hydro	Energy conservation	Burghardt Wolowich Crunkhorn	The Partners' Film Company Ltd.	
Timers	Ontario Hydro	Energy conservation	Burghardt Wolowich Crunkhorn	The Partners' Film Company Ltd.	
Bistro	William Neilson Ltd.	Cadbury Caramilk	Scali McCabe, Sloves (Canada) Ltd.	The Partners' Film Company Ltd.	
Surveillance	William Neilson Ltd.	Cadbury Caramilk	Scali McCabe, Sloves (Canada) Ltd.	The Partners' Film Company Ltd.	
Transformation	Nike International	Nike Air 180	Wieden and Kennedy	The Partners' Film Company Ltd.	

== Works cited ==
- Mathijs, Ernest (2008). The Cinema of David Cronenberg: From Baron of Blood to Cultural Hero. Wallflower Press. ISBN 9781905674657.
- Rodley, Chris, ed. (1997). Cronenberg on Cronenberg. Faber and Faber. ISBN 0571191371.
