= Consumed =

Consumed may refer to:

== Books ==
- Consumed (Wallop book), a 2013 book by Harry Wallop
- Consumed (novel), a 2014 debut novel by David Cronenberg

== Film and television ==
- Consumed (2015 film), a 2015 American film
- Consumed (2024 film), a 2024 American film
- "Consumed" (Haven), a television series episode of Haven
- "Consumed" (Law & Order: Criminal Intent), a television series episode
- "Consumed" (The Walking Dead), an episode of the television series The Walking Dead
- Consumed (TV series), a reality television series on HGTV Canada

== Music ==
- Consumed (band), an English punk rock band
- Consumed (God album), 1993
- Consumed (Plastikman album), 1998
- Consumed (Final Cut album), 1992

== See also ==
- Consumer, a user of goods and services
- Consumption (disambiguation)
