= Videodrome (soundtrack) =

Videodrome Original Motion Picture Soundtrack

Soundtrack album by Howard Shore
- Released: 1982
- Recorded: London
- Genre: Soundtrack
- Length: 33:50
- Label: Varèse Sarabande
- Producer: Scot Holton

Videodrome is the official soundtrack album of the 1983 Canadian science fiction horror film Videodrome. While the film's score was composed by Howard Shore, a close friend of the Director David Cronenberg, the album was remixed for individual release by the record label Varèse Sarabande. The new mix was done by Scot Holton who chose to emphasize many of the elements of the score differently from in the original film.

The soundtrack was released on vinyl in 1982 by Varèse Sarabande, and subsequently re-released on CD in 1998. It is currently out of print. However, it was again released by La-La Land Records in 2022, marking the first release of the score as heard in the film.

Videodrome (The Complete Restored Score)

Soundtrack album by Howard Shore
- Released: 2022
- Studio: Abbey Road Studios
- Genre: Soundtrack
- Length: 37:41
- Label: La-La Land Records
- Producer: Howard Shore

== Recording ==
Videodrome was the third film of Cronenberg's to be scored by Howard Shore. For the recording, Shore used dramatic orchestral music that increasingly incorporated, and eventually emphasized, electronic instrumentation. This was designed to follow the protagonist Max Renn's descent into video hallucinations. In order to achieve this, Shore composed the entire score for an orchestra before programming it into a Synclavier II digital synthesizer. The rendered score, taken from the Synclavier II, was then recorded being played in tandem with a small string section. The resulting sound was a subtle blend that often made it difficult to tell which sounds were real and which were synthesized.

=== Differences from the film ===
The album is not a direct copy of the music used in the film, but rather a remixing. The mix was an assembly of the film's original tracks that often accentuated the various layers of the music differently from in the film itself. It also includes elements of synthesized speech and sound effects. The mix was done by Scot Holton of Varèse Sarabande, who loved many of the subtler elements of the film's score and made them more prominent in the album's tracks. Shore has commented that while there were small issues with some of the acoustic numbers, that "on the whole I think they did very well."

== Reception ==
Professional ratings
Review scores
Source	Rating
Allmusic	4.5/5 stars

While largely unnoticed by critics, the reception to the Videodrome soundtrack has been largely favourable. Praise was given to the synthesized elements for creating a dark and ominous tone while capturing the hallucinatory reality of the film. One critic went so far as to call it "music that harnesses the transformative power of technology to warn against its growing influences over everyone." These electronic elements have been criticized as well, with one critic noting that it could be viewed as "a lackluster venture into cost cutting," but notes that "the results are thematically precise and satisfying."

After the initial release in 1982, the album's popularity was strong enough to cause Varèse Sarabande to recommend its release onto CD. It was released on CD in 1998 and was out of print until a re-press in 2010. However, it was given a limited edition release by La-La Land Records in 2022, featuring a "remastered and restored presentation of the film’s notable score", produced by Shore and Alan Frey and mastered at Abbey Road Studios.

== Track listing ==
Original Soundtrack
No.	Title	Length
1.	"Welcome to Videodrome"	4:13
2.	"801 A/B"	7:17
3.	"A Slow Burn"	4:49
4.	"TV or Not TV"	5:11
5.	"TV Passions"	5:51
6.	"Pins and Needles"	3:06
7.	"Long Live the New Flesh"	3:27
Total length:		33:50

La-La Land Limited Edition
No.	Title	Length
1.	"Cable 83"	0:19
2.	"Piercing"	3:01
3.	"Civic TV"	2:21
4.	"Got A Cigarette"	1:32
5.	"Nicki Inside"	1:19
6.	"Come To Me"	3:12
7.	"Samurai Dreams No.13"	2:03
8.	"Whipping"	2:31
9.	"In Bed"	1:20
10.	"The New Flesh"	2:04
11.	"Spectacular Optical"	0:12
12.	"Transformation"	3:28
13.	"Gun In Gut"	2:40
14.	"Cathode Ray Mission"	0:48
15.	"Videodrome Is Death"	3:30
16.	"Grenade"	2:11
17.	"Condemned Vessel"	5:10
Total length:		37:41
