= Preludes (film series) =

Preludes is a Canadian short film series, which premiered in 2000. Commissioned by the Toronto International Film Festival to mark the event's 25th anniversary in 2000, the series consisted of ten short films by Canadian directors which were inspired in some way by the festival, and each film screened as a prelude to a feature film in the 2000 Toronto International Film Festival program.

The most successful film in the series was Guy Maddin's The Heart of the World, which won numerous awards including the Genie Award for Best Live Action Short Film at the 22nd Genie Awards. David Cronenberg's entry, Camera, was also a Genie nominee in the same category.

The full Preludes program was subsequently screened on the web, on a platform funded by Bell Canada.

== Films ==
Film	Director	Synopsis
24fps	Jeremy Podeswa	An essay film about Podeswa's father and his love of Marcel Carné's classic French film Children of Paradise.
Camera	David Cronenberg	An actor (Leslie Carlson) discusses the current state of film while a group of young children sneak in with production equipment to film him.
Congratulations	Mike Jones	Mike Jones and his siblings Andy and Cathy travel by helicopter from rural Newfoundland to a gala to make speeches congratulating TIFF on its anniversary.
Legs Apart	Anne Wheeler	A pregnant woman's difficult labour is a metaphor for the challenges of making films in Canada.
The Line	Atom Egoyan	Over a tracking shot of filmgoers lining up to attend a screening, Egoyan narrates his memories of attending TIFF in its early years.
The Heart of the World	Guy Maddin	Two brothers (Caelum Vatnsdal and Shaun Balbar) compete for the love of the same woman.
Prelude	Michael Snow	An experimental film in which the sound is played backward in relation to its narrative.
See You in Toronto	Jean Pierre Lefebvre	Samuel de Champlain (Marcel Sabourin) delivers a monologue on how history might have changed if the Battle of the Plains of Abraham had been filmed.
This Might Be Good	Patricia Rozema	After a woman (Sarah Polley) attending a TIFF gala realizes that the other woman her boyfriend has shown up with is actually his wife, she meets a potential new love interest in a festival projectionist (Don McKellar).
A Word from the Management	Don McKellar	McKellar recounts his own experiences of having been a festival volunteer and employee.
