= Stereo (1969 film) =

- DVD cover for Stereo and Crimes of the Future
- Directed by: David Cronenberg
- Written by: David Cronenberg
- Produced by: David Cronenberg
- Starring: Ronald Mlodzik; Jack Messinger; Iain Ewing; Clara Mayer; Paul Mulholland; Arlene Mlodzik; Glenn McCauley
- Cinematography: David Cronenberg
- Edited by: David Cronenberg
- Production company: Emergent Films
- Distributed by: Film Canada Presentations
- Release date: June 23, 1969
- Running time: 65 minutes
- Country: Canada
- Language: English
- Budget: $8,500

Stereo (full title Stereo (Tile 3B of a CAEE Educational Mosaic)) is a 1969 Canadian science fiction film directed, written, produced, shot and edited by David Cronenberg in his feature film debut. Starring Ronald Mlodzik, who would go on to appear in later Cronenberg films Crimes of the Future, Shivers, and Rabid, the film was Cronenberg's first feature-length effort, following his two short films, Transfer (1966) and From the Drain (1967). The plot follows several young volunteers who participate in a parapsychological experiment.

== Plot ==
The film purports to be part of a "mosaic" of educational resources by the Canadian Academy of Erotic Enquiry. It documents an experiment by the unseen Dr. Luther Stringfellow. A young man (Ronald Mlodzik) in a black cloak is seen arriving at the Academy, where he joins a group of young volunteers who are being endowed with telepathic abilities which they are encouraged to develop through sexual exploration. It is hoped that telepathic groups, bonded in polymorphous sexual relationships, will form a socially stabilising replacement for the "obsolescent family unit". One girl develops a secondary personality in order to cope with her new state of consciousness, which gradually ousts her original personality. As the volunteers' abilities develop, the experimenters find themselves increasingly unable to control the progress of the experiment. They decide to separate the telepaths, which results in two suicides. The final sequence shows the young woman who developed an extra personality wearing the black cloak.

== Cast ==
- Ronald Mlodzik (credited as Ron Mlodzik)
- Jack Messinger
- Paul Mulholland
- Iain Ewing
- Arlene Mlodzik
- Clara Mayer
- Glenn McCauley

== Production ==
Cronenberg used an Arriflex 35 that he gained from a deferred rental from Janet Good at the Canadian Motion Picture Equipment Rental Company. The film was shot in black and white and without synchronized sound due to the noise of the Arriflex 35.

Stereo was shot at the University of Toronto Scarborough from August to 6 November 1968, with a budget of $8,500 (equivalent to $74,239 in 2025). Canada Council donated $3,500 to the film's budget under the writer category as it did not establish a cinema category until the next year.

== Release ==
The film was shown in Toronto on 26 February 1969, premiered at the National Arts Centre on 23 June. Cronenberg paid for two screenings of the film before a businessman paid $10,000 for the film's distribution rights. The businessman showed the film at the Museum of Modern Art.

Stereo did not receive a proper home media release until being included as an extra in the 2004 DVD release of Fast Company.

== Reception ==
Jacob Siskind, writing in the Montreal Gazette, stated that the film "is at once promising and disappointing". Martin Malina, writing in the Montreal Star, stated that it was "fresh, unconventional and, I suspect, thoroughly uncommercial". Robert Fulford, using the pseudonym Marshall Delaney, also praised the film.

== Home video ==
The film has been included as a special feature in multiple releases of other Cronenberg films, including in standard definition on Blue Underground's Blu-ray release of Fast Company, in high definition on Criterion release of Scanners and also in high definition on a bonus disc in Arrow Video's UK Blu-ray release of Videodrome. The bonus disc from Videodrome was later released on its own as David Cronenberg's Early Works together with the director's first two short films and his sophomore feature Crimes of the Future.

== Other media ==
A draft of the screenplay was included in a 2002 anthology of scripts for some of Cronenberg's early films.

== Works cited ==
- Handling, Piers (1976). Canadian Feature Films: 1913-1969; Part 3: 1964-1969. Canadian Film Institute.
- Mathijs, Ernest (2008). The Cinema of David Cronenberg: From Baron of Blood to Cultural Hero. Wallflower Press. ISBN 9781905674657.
- Rodley, Chris, ed. (1997). Cronenberg on Cronenberg. Faber and Faber. ISBN 0571191371.
- Turner, D. John, ed. (1987). Canadian Feature Film Index: 1913-1985. Canadian Film Institute. ISBN 0660533642.
