= Ronald Mlodzik =

Canadian actor

- Mlodzik as Mr. Merrick, the Starliner Towers building manager in Shivers (1975)
- Born: Canada
- Years active: 1969–1977
- Known for: Lead roles in early David Cronenberg films

Ronald Mlodzik (sometimes credited as "Ron Mlodzik" and "Ronald Mlodzyk") is a Canadian archdeacon, retired actor, and retired professor best known for his myriad appearances in the early films of body horror director David Cronenberg, including Stereo (1969), Crimes of the Future (1970), Secret Weapons (1972), Rabid (1977), and Shivers (1975), in which he played his most prominent role as Mr. Merrick, the building manager of the fictional Starliner Towers condominium complex. Mlodzik ceased to appear in any films or television after 1977.

== Career ==
Ronald Mlodzik was a longtime collaborator and friend of David Cronenberg, and acted as the protagonist in both Stereo and Crimes of the Future, in which he played the lead character Adrian Tripod. He also starred as "the Inquisitor/Mr. Lee" in a lesser-known Cronenberg production titled Secret Weapons, completed in 1972 and part of a television series called Programme X. His most well-known role was as the character Mr. Ronald Merrick, a building manager for the fictional Starliner Towers condominium complex (filmed in the real-life Tourelle-Sur-Rive complex on Nuns' Island, Montreal, Quebec, Canada). The character, who is portrayed as a conservative and eccentric but benevolent man who is later poisoned by a parasite taking over Starliner Towers, received renewed attention in queer theory; "[Mr. Merrick] is the archetype of the stereotypically feminized nature of modern urban middle-class masculinity", according to Julian Petley in his 2021 book Shocking Cinema of the 70s, in which Petley also points out that Mlodzik is openly gay and compares Mr. Merrick's businessman personality in juxtaposition with the lack of privilege for LGBTQ+ people in the 1970s when Shivers was originally made. David Cronenberg addressed this himself in the Chris Rodley book Cronenberg On Cronenberg, referring to Ronald Mlodzik as "a very elegant gay scholar, an intellectual who was studying at Massey College... whose medieval gay sensibility" very directly connects to [Cronenberg's] aesthetic sense of [Mlodzik's] space...". Film critic Tim Robey echoed Cronenberg's sentiment in a modern reanalysis of body horror cinema, saying, "the choice of lead actor [in the film Stereo], the dapper, overtly gay Ron Mlodzik, whose debonair gait in a black cloak, and expansive facial manner, are its funniest and most idiosyncratic assets... starting with Mlodzik, who reappeared in Cronenberg’s follow-up Crimes of the Future (1970), you can trace a line through the director’s male protagonists to see them consistently positioned as outsider figures, uncanny presences and the lodes of an alien sexuality which isn’t necessarily homosexual (but can be)." Geoff Pevere of The Globe and Mail considered Mlodzik an "androgynous dead ringer" for fellow character actor Caleb Landry Jones, who appears in the 2012 film Antiviral, directed by David Cronenberg's son, Brandon Cronenberg, as an early project.

== Personal life ==
Ronald Mlodzik has a sister, Arlene Mlodzik, who co-acted with him in Stereo (she is Dean of the American Business School in Paris). Post-1977, Mlodzik was employed as professor of English and Film Study at Champlain College, Lennoxville, Quebec, where he served terms as Coordinator of the Department of English, as well as the Creative Arts Program. He retired in 2001. Mlodzik is orthodox Catholic, and became a subdeacon in 1989. On the 19th of August, 2002, at the Divine Liturgy in St. Seraphim’s Church in Rawdon, Quebec, Subdeacon Monk Amvrosi (Mlodzik) was ordained to the Holy Diaconate. He was then assigned to the Communauté Monastique de St-Séraphim de Sarov à Rawdon QC. He attained the status of Archdeacon and has since retired.

== Filmography ==
=== Film ===
Year	Title	Role	Notes
1969	Stereo	Unnamed man	Mlodzik is credited as his own real name in this film.
1970	Crimes of the Future	Adrian Tripod	
1972	Programme X: Secret Weapons (television short film)	The Inquisitor/Mr. Lee	
1973	The Paper Chase	Law student (uncredited)	
1975	Shivers	Mr. Ronald Merrick	Film was also marketed under the titles Frissons (French), They Came From Within and Orgy of the Blood Parasites
1977	Rabid	Male patient	
