= Shivers (1975 film) =

1975 body horror film by David Cronenberg

- United States theatrical release poster, featuring an alternate title
- Directed by: David Cronenberg
- Written by: David Cronenberg
- Produced by: Ivan Reitman
- Starring: Paul Hampton; Lynn Lowry; Barbara Steele
- Cinematography: Robert Saad
- Edited by: Patrick Dodd
- Production company: DAL Productions
- Distributed by: Cinépix Film Properties
- Release dates: September 26, 1975 (San Antonio, Texas); October 10, 1975 (Montreal)
- Running time: 87 minutes
- Country: Canada
- Language: English
- Budget: CAD$179,000
- Box office: CAD$5 million

Shivers, also known as The Parasite Murders and They Came from Within, and, for Canadian distribution in French, Frissons (IPA: /friːˈsoʊn/ free-SOHN; 'chills' or 'shivers'), is a 1975 Canadian science fiction body horror film written and directed by David Cronenberg and starring Paul Hampton, Lynn Lowry, and Barbara Steele.

== Plot ==
At Starliner Towers, a luxury apartment complex outside Montreal, Dr. Emil Hobbes murders a young woman named Annabelle. He slices open her stomach, pours acid into the wound and then kills himself. Nick Tudor, who has been suffering from stomach convulsions, finds their bodies but leaves without calling the police. The two bodies are found by resident doctor Roger St. Luc, who calls the police. Hobbes' medical partner, Rollo Linsky, tells St. Luc that he and Hobbes had been working on a project to create "a parasite that can take over the function of a human organ."

After suffering more convulsions, Nick leaves work early. He vomits a parasite over the railing of his balcony. The parasite slithers back into the apartment complex, where it attacks a cleaning woman in the basement, attaching itself to her face. Nick's wife Janine tries to care for him, but he ignores her and prefers to talk to the parasites undulating in his abdomen. At the clinic, Roger sees a sexually active middle-aged resident who has been suffering from stomach convulsions. Roger speculates that his condition might be an STD that he caught from Annabelle.

Linsky calls Roger from Hobbes' office downtown to tell him that Hobbes had developed a parasite that his notes described as "a combination of aphrodisiac and venereal disease that will, hopefully, turn the world into one beautiful mindless orgy." Hobbes believed modern humans had become over-intellectual and estranged from their primal impulses. Hobbes' ambition with his parasitic invention was to reassert humanity's unbridled, sexually aggressive instincts, and he used Annabelle as his guinea pig. Linsky warns Roger not to approach anyone who is behaving in a strange manner.

Nick tries to force his wife Janine to have sex with him, but she recoils in horror when one of the parasites crawls from his mouth. She rushes to the apartment of her friend Betts, who was infected by one of the parasites while taking a bath. Betts seduces Janine and, as they kiss, passes a parasite to her. Meanwhile, other residents, including a little girl in an elevator with her mother, who are assaulted by a deliveryman, become infected with the parasite, attack other residents and continue to spread the infection. Soon the hallways are full of people sexually assaulting or fighting one another. Roger combs the complex looking for the parasites while Forsythe—his nurse and lover—tends to an elderly couple who were attacked by one of the parasites.

Linsky arrives at Starliner Towers and goes to the Tudor apartment, as Roger had identified Nick as someone Annabelle might have infected. He finds Nick lying in bed, parasites crawling on his abdomen. When Linsky examines him more closely, one of the parasites latches onto his cheek. Linsky tries to pull it off with pliers, but Nick kills him and swallows the parasite. Forsythe tries to flee the complex in her car but is attacked by the infected security guard. Before he can rape her, Roger arrives and kills him, and the two hide in the basement. Forsythe tells Roger of a dream that mixed eroticism and death, then vomits up a parasite. Roger knocks her out and tries to carry her to safety, but they are attacked by a horde of infected sex maniacs. Roger is separated from Forsythe and is forced to flee as she is overwhelmed by the infected.

Roger kills Nick in his apartment, then tries to escape the complex, but is thwarted at every turn. He finally makes it to the swimming pool area where he encounters Janine and Betts swimming fully clothed. The two walk to the edge of the pool and smile seductively at him as he finds a door to the outside, but the infected block his path and he is pulled into the pool by Janine and Betts. The rest of the infected, including the little girl from the elevator, plunge into the pool fully dressed or otherwise and swim towards Roger to hold him down. Roger is eventually surrounded and finally infected by Forsythe.

Roger, Forsythe and the other Starliner residents drive out of the building's garage. The next morning, a news report reveals an epidemic of sexual assaults in Montreal as police investigate.

== Cast ==
- Fred Doederlein as Emil Hobbes
- Cathy Graham as Annabelle
- Paul Hampton as Roger St. Luc
- Joe Silver as Rollo Linsky
- Lynn Lowry as Nurse Forsythe
- Alan Migicovsky as Nicholas Tudor
- Susan Petrie as Janine Tudor
- Barbara Steele as Betts
- Ronald Mlodzik as Mr. Merrick
- Barry Boldero as Det. Heller
- Camil Ducharme as Mr. Guilbault
- Hanka Posnanska as Mrs. Guilbault
- Wally Martin as Doorman
- Vlasta Vrána as Kresimer Sviben
- Silvie Debois as Benda Sviben

== Production ==
After finishing Crimes of the Future, David Cronenberg lived in Tourrettes-sur-Loup, France, where he shot filler for the Canadian Broadcasting Corporation using a 16 mm camera he purchased with a Canada Council grant. During his time in France he went to the Cannes Film Festival where he realized that he "couldn't make movies like Stereo and Crimes and consider myself a professional film-maker" and that he needed a broader audience. He returned to Canada and started work on Shivers.

Cronenberg joined Cinépix which he described as "sleazy distributors, and I say that with great affection — my kind of people". Cinépix was attempting to enter the American market and John Dunning believed that Cronenberg's film would aid them.

It took around three years to gain financial backing from the Canadian Film Development Corporation which viewed the movie as "disgusting, awful, horrific, perverse" according to Cronenberg. Jonathan Demme was offered the position of director. Cronenberg directed the film, but stated "I had fifteen days to learn how to make a movie. I didn't know how to make movies, just films." and that he "didn't know what the fuck was going on" at his first production meeting. Ivan Reitman was appointed as a line producer.

The film was written under the titles The Parasite Complex, Starliner, and Orgy of the Blood Parasites. It was shot at Nuns' Island from 21 August to 17 September 1974. The film was given a budget of $115,000, but cost $179,000 (equivalent to $1,121,824 in 2025) with $76,500 coming from the CFDC. Dick Smith and Joe Blasco worked on effects and makeup for the film. It was shot at Tourelle-Sur-Rive, a 1962 apartment building designed by Mies van der Rohe. While filming, Lynn Lowry accidentally struck Cronenberg in the shoulder with a cooking fork.

== Release ==
The film was released as Shivers in Canada and the United Kingdom, The Parasite Murders and Frissons in Quebec, and They Came from Within in the United States. The film was released in Canada in Montreal by Cinépix on 10 October 1975, in English in three theatres and in French in seven theatres. Regional showings in the United States started in San Antonio, Texas, on September 26, 1975.

It was shown at the Cannes Film Market and the Edinburgh International Film Festival in 1975. Shivers and Rabid were re-released as a double feature in Paris in December 1994.

=== Home media ===
The film was released on DVD by Image Entertainment on September 16, 1998. On September 15, 2020, Lionsgate issued the film on Blu-ray in the United States as part of its Vestron Video Collector's Series. This release includes, among other features, a new commentary by Cronenberg.

== Reception ==
=== Critical response ===
On Rotten Tomatoes, the film has a rating of 85% based on reviews from 26 critics, with an average rating of 6.7/10. The site's consensus states, "Shivers uses elementally effective basic ingredients to brilliant effect — and lays the profoundly unsettling foundation for director David Cronenberg's career to follow". Metacritic, which uses a weighted average, assigned the film a score of 58 out of 100, based on 9 critics, indicating "mixed or average" reviews.

Critical reaction to the initial release of the movie was negative, however. Of a selection of 28 reviews from Canada, the United States, the United Kingdom, Belgium, and France, 16 reviews were negative—12 of these very negative—versus 6 that were positive. Of the positive reviews, 3 were very positive. 6 reviews were neutral. Canadian critics such as Martin Knelman, in The Globe and Mail, and Dane Larnken, in the Montreal Gazette, gave the film negative reviews. American critic Roger Ebert noted that while he expected Shivers to be a dismal exploitation film, since it was part of a double bill with the purported snuff film Snuff, he instead was impressed by much of the movie. He gave it 2 1/2 stars.

Canadian journalist Robert Fulford previously praised Cronenberg's prior film Stereo. However, Fulford, writing under the pseudonym Marshall Delaney, decried the content of Shivers in the national magazine Saturday Night. Because Cronenberg's film was partially financed by the taxpayer-funded CFDC, Fulford headlined the article with You should know how bad this film is. After all, you paid for it. He called it "crammed with blood, violence and depraved sex", and "the most repulsive movie I've ever seen." Not only did this high-profile attack make it more difficult for Cronenberg to obtain funding for his subsequent movies it also resulted in him being kicked out of his apartment in Toronto according to Cronenberg, due to his landlord's inclusion of a "morality clause" in the lease. The controversy over the sexual and violent content of Shivers grew to the point that the Parliament of Canada debated the film's social and artistic value and effect upon society.

=== Box office ===
The film was successful in Quebec, but failed in the United States with Cronenberg blaming American International Pictures's poor distribution. Multiple scenes were cut from the American release to prevent an X rating. The film earned around $5 million after a theatrical release in forty countries.

Making $1 million in Canada, Shivers was one of the highest-grossing English-language Canadian films of all time, and more profitable than any previous Canadian film. According to Cronenberg it was the first film funded by the CFDC to earn a profit.

== Accolades ==
Award	Date of ceremony	Category	Recipient(s)	Result	Ref.
Sitges Film Festival	1976	Best Director	David Cronenberg	Won	

== Related works ==
The screenplay was published by Faber & Faber in the 2002 collection David Cronenberg: Collected Screenplays 1: Stereo, Crimes of the Future, Shivers, Rabid. The British horror movie magazine Shivers, which was published between 1992 and 2008, was named in tribute to this film.

== See also ==
- List of cult films
- Parasites in fiction
- Rabid

== Works cited ==
- Cronenberg, David (2006). David Cronenberg: Interviews with Serge Grünberg. Plexus Publishing. ISBN 0859653765.
- Jancovich, Mark (2003). Defining Cult Movies: The Cultural Politics of Oppositional Tastes. Manchester University Press. ISBN 071906631X.
- Mathijs, Ernest (2008). The Cinema of David Cronenberg: From Baron of Blood to Cultural Hero. Wallflower Press. ISBN 9781905674657.
- Rodley, Chris, ed. (1997). Cronenberg on Cronenberg. Faber and Faber. ISBN 0571191371.
- Turner, D. John, ed. (1987). Canadian Feature Film Index: 1913-1985. Canadian Film Institute. ISBN 0660533642.
- Vatnsdal, Caelum (2004). They Came From Within: A History of Canadian Horror Cinema. Arbeiter Ring Publishing. ISBN 978-1-894037-21-1.
