= Les Carlson =

American actor (1933-2014)

- Born: Leslie Merle Carlson; February 24, 1933; Mitchell, South Dakota, U.S.
- Died: May 3, 2014 (aged 81); Toronto, Ontario, Canada
- Education: University of South Dakota
- Occupation: Actor
- Years active: 1967–2010
- Spouses: Patricia Hamilton (divorced); Joan Warren (m. 1983)
- Children: 2, including Ben
- Military career
- Allegiance: United States
- Branch: Air Force
- Conflicts: Korean War

Leslie Merle Carlson (February 24, 1933 – May 3, 2014) was an American actor, who spent most of his professional life in Canada. He is known to film audiences for his work with directors David Cronenberg and Bob Clark, and was also a prolific stage actor. He was nominated for the Genie Award for Best Supporting Actor for his performance in Cronenberg's Videodrome (1983), and won a Dora Award for his performance in the Athol Fugard play Valley Song (1996).

== Early life ==
Carlson was born in Mitchell, South Dakota, in 1933. He was a multi-sport athlete in his youth, playing football, basketball, and track and field. During the Korean War, he served in the United States Air Force. He earned both a BFA and a MA from the University of South Dakota, which he attended in the 1950s on the G.I. Bill.

== Career ==
Carlson's acting career performing in several stage plays in both the U.S and England. He immigrated to Canada in the late 1960s and began acting in many films, TV shows, and stage productions in the early 1970s.

His most memorable film roles were in the horror classic Black Christmas and Deranged, both in 1974 and as a pushy Christmas tree salesman in A Christmas Story in 1983. Carlson appeared in four movies from director David Cronenberg, including Videodrome and The Dead Zone. His portrayal of the antagonist Barry Convex in Videodrome earned him a Genie Award nomination for Best Supporting Actor. His TV appearances include The X-Files, Friday the 13th: The Series, 21 Jump Street and Road to Avonlea.

His stage performances included the premiere of Leaving Home, A Walk in the Woods in 1991 at the Gateway Theatre, Death and the Maiden in 1993 with the Vancouver Playhouse Theatre Company, the musical Jekyll & Hyde in 1996 for the Canadian Stage Company, Glengarry Glen Ross, Hamlet, and All My Sons. He played notable stints with the Tarragon Theatre, the Stratford Festival, the Shaw Festival, and the Theatre Calgary.

== Personal life ==
Carlson was married to actress Patricia Hamilton and they had one child together, actor Ben Carlson. He had another son, Edmund Carlson, with his second wife, Joan Warren, in 1988.

== Death ==
Carlson died of cancer in Toronto, Ontario, aged 81, on 3 May 2014.

== Filmography ==
=== Film ===
Year	Title	Role	Notes
1973	The Neptune Factor	Brigs	
1973	The Hard Part Begins	The Mechanic	
1974	Deranged	Tom Sims	
1974	Black Christmas	Bill Graham	
1975	The Last of the Four Letter Words		
1976	Love at First Sight	Stu	
1976	Shoot	Jim	
1977	I Wasn't Scared	Master Warrant Officer George Lewinsky	
1977	Raku Fire		
1977	Deadly Harvest	The Minister	
1977	Who Has Seen the Wind	Joe Pivotte	
1978	High-Ballin'	Bud	
1979	Lost and Found	Jean-Paul	
1980	Circle of Two	Doctor	
1980	Nothing Personal	Marshal	
1981	Mr. Patman	Mr. Abernathy	
1981	Improper Channels		
1983	Videodrome	Barry Convex	
1983	The Dead Zone	Brenner	
1983	A Christmas Story	Christmas Tree Man	
1984	That's My Baby	Max	
1986	The Fly	Dr. Brent Cheevers	
1987	Smart Street	Marty	
1987	Rolling Vengeance	Misty's Father	
1989	Sing	Suit	
1990	Chaindance	Willy	
1991	K2	Dexter	
1992	Impolite	Billy	
1995	Young Again	Mr. Dillon	
1999	The Wishing Tree	Professor	
2000	Camera	The Actor	Short film
2000	Silver Man	Mule	
2000	The Spreading Ground	Magyar	
2001	Short 6	The Actor	
2002	Left Behind II: Tribulation Force	Eli	
2005	Looking for Angelina	Justice Britton	
2007	Your Beautiful Cul de Sac Home	Harry Peale	

=== Television ===
Year	Title	Role	Notes
1972	Norman Corwin Presents		1 episode - Letters from an Only Child
1974	Deedee		Television film (credited as Les Carlson)
1975	King of Kensington		1 episode - Where's Cathy?
1977	Custard Pie	Aldo Ludwit	(credited as Les Carlson)
1977	Who Has Seen the Wind	Joe Pivotte	(credited as Les Carlson)
1977	The New Avengers	Douglas Collings	1 episode - Emily
1978	Catsplay		TV movie
1981	Escape from Iran: The Canadian Caper	Laingen	Television film (credited as Les Carlson)
1982	Shocktrauma	Elton Bates	Television Film (credited as Les Carlson)
1982, 1983	The Littlest Hobo		2 episodes - Forget Me Not, Trucker
1985	Night Heat	Harder	1 episode - Ancient Madness
1986	The Laurenceville Stories	Conover	TV mini-series
1986	Unnatural Causes	Bob	Television film (credited as Les Carlson)
1987	American Playhouse	Conover	1 episode - The Prodigious Hickey
1987	Anne of Green Gables: The Sequel	Mr. Marty Charles Lawson	Television film (credited as Les Carlson)
1988	War of the Worlds	Detective #1	1 episode - The Walls of Jericho
1988	The Twilight Zone	Jim Hilsen	1 episode - The Hunters (credited as Les Carlson)
1989	Looking for Miracles	Principal	Television film (credited as Les Carlson)
1989	Friday the 13th: The Series	Arkwright	1 episode - The Prisoner
1989	Street Legal	Squire/Michael	2 episodes - Romeo and Carol, See No Evil (1987–1989)
1990	Scales of Justice	Larry Proke	1 episode - Regina vs Horvath (credited as Les Carlson)
1990	Mom P.I.	Jack Millsteinare	1 episode - Looking for a Living
1990	Neon Rider	Brent Paxton	1 episode - All's Fair
1990	MacGyver	"Sparky" / Doctor	2 episodes - Ma Dalton, Passages (credited as Les Carlson)
1990	21 Jump Street	Professor Gray	1 episode - Diplomats for Sale
1991	Road to Avonlea	Mr. Lawson	7 episodes - The Story Girl Earns Her Name, The Quarantine at Alexander Abraham's, The Materializing of Duncan McTavish, Aunt Abigail's Beau, Malcolm and the Baby, Sara's Homecoming, Dreamer of Dreams (1990–1991) (credited as Les Carlson)
1991	The Girl from Mars	Mr. Sharbut	Television film
1992	Highlander: The Series	Sam Thompson	2 episodes - Free Fall, Deadly Medicine
1992	To Grandmother's House We Go	Doorman	Television film
1992	Dead Ahead: The Exxon Valdez Disaster	Theo Polasek	Television film
1993	Morning Glory	Howard Pride	Television film
1993	A Stranger in the Mirror	Harry Durkin	Television film
1993	No Child of Mine		Television film
1994	The X-Files	Dr. Spitz; Dr. Troisky	2 episodes - "Born Again", "Little Green Men"
1995	The Song Spinner	Lorie	Television film
1996	Moonshine Highway	Pappy	Television film (credited as Les Carlson)
1996	Side Effects	Dr. Herschel Eisen	1 episode - You Can Run
1996	Beyond the Call	Dan	Television film (credited as Les Carlson)
1997	Psi Factor: Chronicles of the Paranormal	Dr. Dale Hoff	1 episode - Donor
2000	Catch a Falling Star	Man At Station	Television film
2000	The Harlan County War	Udell	Television film
2000	The Last Debate	Pat Tubbs	Television film
2001	Haven	Old Man	TV mini-series
2001	Bailey's Mistake	Stableman	Television film
2001	Stolen Miracle	Mr. Neelandson	Television film (credited as Les Carlson)
2002	Odyssey 5	Ruckner	1 episode - Astronaut Dreams
2002	The Berenstain Bears	Gramps	1 episode - Trouble with Grown-ups/Too Much TV (credited as Lesley Carlson)
2004	Anonymous Rex	Man	Television film (credited as Les Carlson)
2004	Snow	Chester	Television film (credited as Les Carlson)
2005	Sue Thomas: F.B.Eye	Mr. Weaver	1 episode - Who Wants to Be a Millionaire
2005	Plague City: SARS in Toronto		Television film (credited as Les Carlson)
2010	At Risk	George Finlay	Television film (credited as Les Carlson)
2010	Haven	Vaughn Carpenter	1 episode - "As You Were"
