= Red Cars =

Red Cars is an artist's book realized by Canadian film director David Cronenberg edited by Luca Massimo Barbero, Domenico De Gaetano & Donato Santeramo, in collaboration with Volumina. The project is an interpretation, in the form of an artbook, of the screenplay Red Cars that he planned on turning into a film. The resulting book, "largely missed by critics", was published in 2005.

The plot is about the 1961 Formula One Championship rivalry between Ferrari drivers Phil Hill and Wolfgang von Trips. It includes a script for the yet-to-be-made movie. The book is hand-bound with an aluminum cover. It was published as a coffee-table book and limited to 1000 copies, as a "self-conscious object d’art." Cronenberg describes it as a "way for me to create my film without actors and film crew this book linked to a website and to an exhibition."

An avid race fan, Cronenberg has said that the planned big budget film about auto racing stalled due to the demands of Formula One head, Bernie Ecclestone. In 1986, Cronenberg was asked by then Paramount Pictures executive, Ned Tanen, to develop a Formula One movie. Paramount sent Cronenberg to Australia and Mexico to do reconnaissance of Grand Prix races. Cronenberg explained: "I had meetings with Bernie to talk to him about how we might structure a Formula One movie that was modern at the time and could we, for example, invent a team and have a pit for our team." While Ecclestone was at first receptive to the proposals, according to Cronenberg, his requirements would have been expensive: "ultimately it would have come down to money."
