= Camera (2000 film) =

2000 short film by David Cronenberg

- Directed by: David Cronenberg
- Written by: David Cronenberg
- Produced by: Jody Shapiro
- Starring: Leslie Carlson
- Cinematography: André Pienaar
- Edited by: Ronald Sanders
- Music by: Howard Shore
- Release date: 2000
- Running time: 6 minutes
- Country: Canada
- Language: English

Camera is a 2000 Canadian short film written and directed by David Cronenberg. The six-minute short was one of several made for the special Preludes program in celebration of the 25th anniversary of the Toronto International Film Festival. These films, all by Canadian directors, were commissioned as preludes for the festival in 2000.

The film was a Genie Award nominee for Best Live Action Short Film at the 22nd Genie Awards in 2002.

== Plot ==
A seasoned actor discusses the current state of film while a group of young children sneak in with production equipment to film him. The children are enamored with the camera, which the actor views as an infectious, malevolent presence.

== Cast ==
- Leslie Carlson as The Actor
- Marc Donato as Lead
- Harrison Kane as Lead
- Kyle Kass as Lead (as Kyle Kassardjian)
- Natasha La Force (as Natasha LaForce)
- Katie Lai
- Daniel Magder as Director
- Chloe Randle-Reis (as Chloe Reis)
- Stephanie Sams
- Camille Shniffer as Lead

== Production ==
David Cronenberg wrote and directed Camera as part of the Preludes film series, meant for the 25th anniversary of the Toronto International Film Festival. Leslie Carlson previously appeared in Cronenberg's Videodrome, The Dead Zone, and The Fly.

== Home Video ==
Camera was included as a bonus feature on the Criterion Collection releases of Videodrome.

== Works cited ==
- Mathijs, Ernest (2008). The Cinema of David Cronenberg: From Baron of Blood to Cultural Hero. Wallflower Press. ISBN 9781905674657.
