= Peep Show (Canadian TV series) =

Canadian television show

- Country of origin: Canada
- No. of seasons: 1
- No. of episodes: 16

Production
- Producers: George Bloomfield; Gerald Mayer

Original release
- Network: CBC Television
- Release: 1975 – 1976

Peep Show is a Canadian television series, which aired on CBC Television in 1975 and 1976. The series, a 16-episode anthology of half-hour drama programs by new and emerging Canadian writers and directors, was produced by George Bloomfield and Gerald Mayer. The eleven programs produced by Bloomfield leaned more to experimentation, while the five produced by Mayer were more in the vein of traditional television.

Programs that aired on Peep Show included Martin Lavut's Melony, Clarke Mackey's Fight Night, David Cronenberg's The Lie Chair and CODCO's Festering Forefathers and Running Sons. Martin Short also had one of his earliest television appearances on the series, in the episode Goldberg is Waiting.

The show was not renewed for a second season due to budget constraints.
