= Consumed (Wallop book) =

2013 non-fiction book by Harry Wallop

Consumed: How shopping fed the class system
- Authors: Harry Wallop
- Language: English
- Subjects: Politics, Philosophy
- Published: 2013 (Collins)
- Publication place: United Kingdom
- Media type: Print (Hardcover), e-book
- Pages: 336
- ISBN: 978-0-007-45708-3
- OCLC: 810945988

Consumed: How shopping fed the class system, also published as Consumed: How We Buy Class in Modern Britain, is a 2013 book by Harry Wallop. It explores our personal identity and sense of self and self-worth have come to be defined by what we buy. It uses several detailed examples to show how advertisers and marketeers have driven our consumerism.

== Content ==
Core themes of Wallop's book revolve around economic class, especially in British society. He argues that a classless society will not be reached. Instead, his thesis is that in our modern world class is derived from "how" one spends their money, not where it comes from. Wallop uses different examples to strengthen his argument, from personal stories and interviews to ONS statistics and newspaper archives. The book examines economic class through different lenses, such as food, clothes, education, and leisure. Class is described as built in even to seemingly mundane choices, such as choice of food for the lunch break in an office— something as simple as pizza is, to Wallop, hardwired into the minds of consumers by marketers and brand developers.

== Reception ==
Upon release, reception of the book from the public varied. In 2013, Sam Leith, a literary reviewer at The Guardian, wrote that Wallop was not afraid to use social stereotyping when describing economic classes. Additionally, Leith mentions in his review that other studies had already designated British financial status into economic classes that Wallop sets aside to make his own groupings, believing it would have been better to elaborate further on previous studies. Other literary reviewers found the way Wallop describes different economic classes charming, with one review from The Standard praising the book's humorous comparisons and interesting statistics regarding the relative buying power of money over time.
