= Brother Termite =

1992 novel by Patricia Anthony

"Brother Termite" is a 1992 science fiction novel by Patricia Anthony.

== Synopsis ==
Decades after Dwight Eisenhower helped the alien "Cousins" take over the United States, White House Chief of Staff Reen-Ja must deal with domestic unrest, political infighting, international conflict, the kidnapping of several Cousins, and the terrible secret underlying the Cousins' hidden agenda.

== Reception ==
Kirkus Reviews considered it to be "(c)hilling, memorable work, with splendid characters", as well as "unstoppable narrative momentum" and "an enthralling plot", commending Anthony's portrayal of the aliens as "utterly convincing". Publishers Weekly described it as "occasionally farcical but essentially poignant", "tense, often disturbing", and "a difficult, but rewarding read", and praised the Cousins as "sympathetic characters with a moving plight" (despite their "unjustifiable" actions).

== Planned adaptation ==
In the late 1990s, James Cameron's production company Lightstorm Entertainment was preparing a film adaptation of Brother Termite, with screenplay by John Sayles (Anthony later noted that Sayles "added a scene that [she was] particularly fond of, which did not occur in the book, but probably should have occurred in the book. It works so well.") and Steve Norrington as director; ultimately, the film was not produced, but in 2010, two minutes of test footage from Brother Termite (featuring early use of motion capture) appeared as a bonus feature on the Blu-ray release of Cameron's 2009 film Avatar.
