= Consumed (novel) =

2014 novel by David Cronenberg

- First edition cover
- Author: David Cronenberg
- Cover artist: Chip Kidd
- Language: English
- Genre: Horror
- Publisher: Scribner
- Publication date: 2014
- Publication place: Canada
- Media type: Print (hardcover)
- Pages: 308
- ISBN: 978-1-4165-9614-1
- OCLC: 862347743

Consumed is the first novel by the Canadian filmmaker, screenwriter and actor David Cronenberg.

== Premise ==
The novel is driven by a globe-trotting, photojournalist French couple in their sixties that pursue stories featuring rather unusual people.

== Reception ==
Cronenberg's novel has been compared to Burroughs, Ballard and DeLillo. The book was reviewed in The New York Times, The Guardian and The Independent.

The Guardian wrote the book had "similarly queasy appeal" to Cronenberg's films and was an "utterly depraved tale of sex, technology, and conspiracy."

Stephen King called the book an "eye-opened dazzler" and "as troubling, sinister, and enthralling as his films." Viggo Mortensen said the book had the "scope and poetic exactitude of Nabokov's best work" and had the power to "unsettle, disarm, and...make the reader absolutely complicit."

According to WorldCat, the book is held in 622 libraries.
