= Patricia Anthony =

American novelist

- Born: March 29, 1947; San Antonio, Texas, U.S.
- Died: July 2, 2013 (aged 66)
- Occupation: Novelist
- Writing career
- Period: 1992–2013
- Genres: Science fiction Slipstream
- Notable work: Brother Termite
- Notable awards: Locus Award for Best First Novel

Patricia Marie Anthony (March 29, 1947 – July 2, 2013) was an American author of science fiction and slipstream fiction. Anthony published her first science fiction novel in 1992 with Cold Allies, about the arrival of extraterrestrials in the midst of a 21st-century Third World War. This was followed by Brother Termite, Conscience of the Beagle, The Happy Policeman, Cradle of Splendor, and God's Fires, each of which combined science fiction plots with other genres in unconventional ways. Several of her short-fiction works were republished in the 1998 collection Eating Memories.

== Profile ==
Anthony's best-known and most critically acclaimed work is probably 1993's Brother Termite, a novel focussed on political intrigue told from the perspective of the leader of extraterrestrials who have occupied the United States. James Cameron acquired the movie rights to Brother Termite and John Sayles wrote a script, but the movie has not been produced.

Following her initial success, Anthony taught creative writing at Southern Methodist University for three years, and as her career progressed she moved farther away from the traditional boundaries of the science fiction genre. Her 1998 novel Flanders—the highly metaphysical story of an American sharpshooter in the British Army during World War I -- represented a clean break with her science fiction past and her final outing with Ace Books. It was a critical, if not commercial, success.

After the publication of Flanders, Anthony ceased writing science fiction to work as a screenwriter, though none of her scripts have been green-lighted. Anthony completed a new novel in 2006, but it remains unpublished.

Anthony lived in Brazil during the 1970s and later drew upon that experience for Cradle of Splendor.

== Bibliography ==
- Cold Allies (1992)
- Brother Termite (1993)
- Conscience of the Beagle (1993)
- Happy Policeman (1994)
- Cradle of Splendor (1996)
- God's Fires (1997)
- Flanders (1998) (New York Times Notable Book)
- Eating Memories (1998)
- The Sighting (2020) (published posthumously)
