= Transfer (1966 film) =

- Directed by: David Cronenberg
- Written by: David Cronenberg
- Produced by: David Cronenberg
- Starring: Mort Ritts; Rafe Macpherson
- Cinematography: David Cronenberg
- Edited by: David Cronenberg
- Release date: 1966
- Running time: 7 minutes
- Country: Canada
- Language: English
- Budget: $300

Transfer is a 1966 Canadian short film written, shot, produced, edited and directed by David Cronenberg. It features Mort Ritts and Rafe Macpherson and has a runtime of 7 minutes.

== Plot ==
A psychiatrist and his patient - at a table set for dinner in the middle of a field covered in snow. The psychiatrist has been followed by his obsessive former patient. The only relationship the patient has had which has meant anything to him has been with the psychiatrist. The patient complains that he has invented things to amuse and occasionally worry the psychiatrist but that he has remained unappreciative of his efforts.

== Cast ==
- Mort Ritts
- Rafe Macpherson

== Production ==
Cronenberg wrote, shot, directed, and edited the film in 1966 using $300 (equivalent to $2,815 in 2025). Margaret Hindson and Stephen Nosko, two of his friends, recorded the sound. Cronenberg stated that the title of the film came from Sigmund Freud's concept of transference.

== Reception ==
The Globe and Mail criticized the film as "a pathetic effort" that was "horribly acted and scarcely directed". It also accused Cronenberg of stealing the idea from a Nichols and May sketch.

== Home video ==
The short was included along with Cronenberg's other early films on a bonus disc in Arrow Video's 2015 UK Blu-ray release of Videodrome. This bonus disc, titled David Cronenberg's Early Works, was later released on its own a year later.

== Works cited ==
- Cronenberg, David (2006). David Cronenberg: Interviews with Serge Grünberg. Plexus Publishing. ISBN 0859653765.
- Mathijs, Ernest (2008). The Cinema of David Cronenberg: From Baron of Blood to Cultural Hero. Wallflower Press. ISBN 9781905674657.
- Rodley, Chris, ed. (1997). Cronenberg on Cronenberg. Faber and Faber. ISBN 0571191371.
