= From the Drain =

- Directed by: David Cronenberg
- Written by: David Cronenberg
- Produced by: Stefan Nosko
- Starring: Mort Ritts; Stefan Nosko
- Cinematography: David Cronenberg
- Edited by: David Cronenberg
- Release date: June 1967 (Cinethon)
- Running time: 14 minutes
- Country: Canada
- Language: English
- Budget: $500

From the Drain is a 1967 Canadian short film directed by David Cronenberg.

== Plot summary ==
The film is centered on two men in a bathtub; it is implied that they are veterans of some past conflict but revealed that they are currently in a mental institution. The first man is paranoid about the drain of the tub, the second indifferent to it. After the conversation between the two men progresses, a vine-like tendril emerges from the drain to strangle the first man. The second shows no emotion to this sudden turn of events and the film ends.

== Production ==
Cronenberg wrote, shot, directed, and edited the film using $500 (equivalent to $4,536 in 2025).

== Release ==
The film was shown in June 1967 at the Cinethon festival.

== Home video ==
The short was included along with Cronenberg's other early films on a bonus disc in Arrow Video's 2015 UK Blu-ray release of Videodrome. This bonus disc, entitled David Cronenberg's Early Works was later released on its own a year later.

== Works cited ==
- Rodley, Chris, ed. (1997). Cronenberg on Cronenberg. Faber and Faber. ISBN 0571191371.
