= Crimes of the Future (1970 film) =

- DVD cover for Stereo and Crimes of the Future
- Directed by: David Cronenberg
- Written by: David Cronenberg
- Produced by: David Cronenberg
- Starring: Ronald Mlodzik; Jon Lidolt; Tania Zolty; Jack Messinger; Paul Mulholland; William Haslam; William Poolman
- Narrated by: Ronald Mlodzik
- Cinematography: David Cronenberg
- Edited by: David Cronenberg
- Release date: 1970
- Running time: 63 minutes
- Country: Canada
- Language: English
- Budget: $15,000

Crimes of the Future is a 1970 Canadian science fiction film written, shot, edited and directed by David Cronenberg. Like Cronenberg's previous feature, Stereo, Crimes of the Future was shot silent with a commentary added afterwards, spoken by the character Adrian Tripod (Ronald Mlodzik).

Although the film shares its title with Cronenberg's 2022 film of the same name, the latter is not a remake as the story and concept are unrelated; however, there is a loose connection between the two films, as the main premise of the 2022 film, "creative cancer" also appears in the 1970 version.

== Plot ==
Set in 1997, the film follows Adrian Tripod, an occasional director of the House of Skin, a dermatological clinic. He embarks on a quest to find his mentor, the insane dermatologist Antoine Rouge. Rouge has vanished after a devastating plague, caused by cosmetic products, wiped out all sexually mature women. Allegedly the virus mutated, now affecting men and claiming Rouge's life.

Tripod joins a succession of organisations, including Metaphysical Import-Export and the Oceanic Podiatry Group, and meets various individuals and groups of men trying to adjust themselves to a defeminized world. When a House of Skin patient that Tripod had grown close to dies from the plague, Tripod checks into a mental health clinic and engages in foot fetishism.

Tripod aligns with a group of pedophiles who kidnap a five-year-old girl who has been exposed to chemicals intended to force her into puberty in order to impregnate her. However, one of the group is ultimately unable to bring himself to rape the young girl and leaves her untouched. Tripod enters the room where the girl is kept and sees the girl emit a cream-like white foam from her mouth. This brings him to the realization that, by artificially inducing puberty in the young child, she has become infected with the plague.

== Cast ==
- Ronald Mlodzik as Adrian Tripod
- Jon Lidolt
- Tania Zolty
- Paul Mulholland
- Jack Messinger
- Iain Ewing
- William Haslam
- Brian Linehan
- Raymond Woodley (credited as Ray Woodley)

== Production ==
Cronenberg used an Arriflex 35 that he gained from a deferred rental from Janet Good at the Canadian Motion Picture Equipment Rental Company. The film was shot without synchronized sound due to the noise of the Arriflex 35. The title is a reference to a character writing a book of the same name in Hunger by Knut Hamsun.

Cronenberg started filming Crimes of the Future before his previous film, Stereo, was released. It was shot at Massey College and the University of Toronto from August 1969 to 10 February 1970, on a budget of $15,000 (equivalent to $121,330 in 2025). The film received funding from the Canadian Film Development Corporation and International Film Archives.

== Reception ==
Kim Newman, in his 1988 book Nightmare Movies, has described Crimes of the Future as being "more fun to read about in synopsis than to watch", and as proving, along with Stereo, that "it's possible to be boring and interesting at the same time".

The film has a score of 67% from nine reviews on Rotten Tomatoes. Metacritic, which uses a weighted average, assigned the film a score of 58 out of 100, based on 6 critics, indicating "mixed or average" reviews.

== Release ==
The film was released on LaserDisc in Japan and included on the LaserDisc release of Dead Ringers. It was included as an extra in the 2004 DVD release of Fast Company.

== Other media ==
A draft of the screenplay was published in 2002, along with the scripts for three other early Cronenberg films.

== Works cited ==
- Mathijs, Ernest (2008). The Cinema of David Cronenberg: From Baron of Blood to Cultural Hero. Wallflower Press. ISBN 9781905674657.
- Rodley, Chris, ed. (1997). Cronenberg on Cronenberg. Faber and Faber. ISBN 0571191371.
- Turner, D. John, ed. (1987). Canadian Feature Film Index: 1913-1985. Canadian Film Institute. ISBN 0660533642.
