= David Cronenberg =

Canadian filmmaker (born 1943)

David Cronenberg CC OOnt
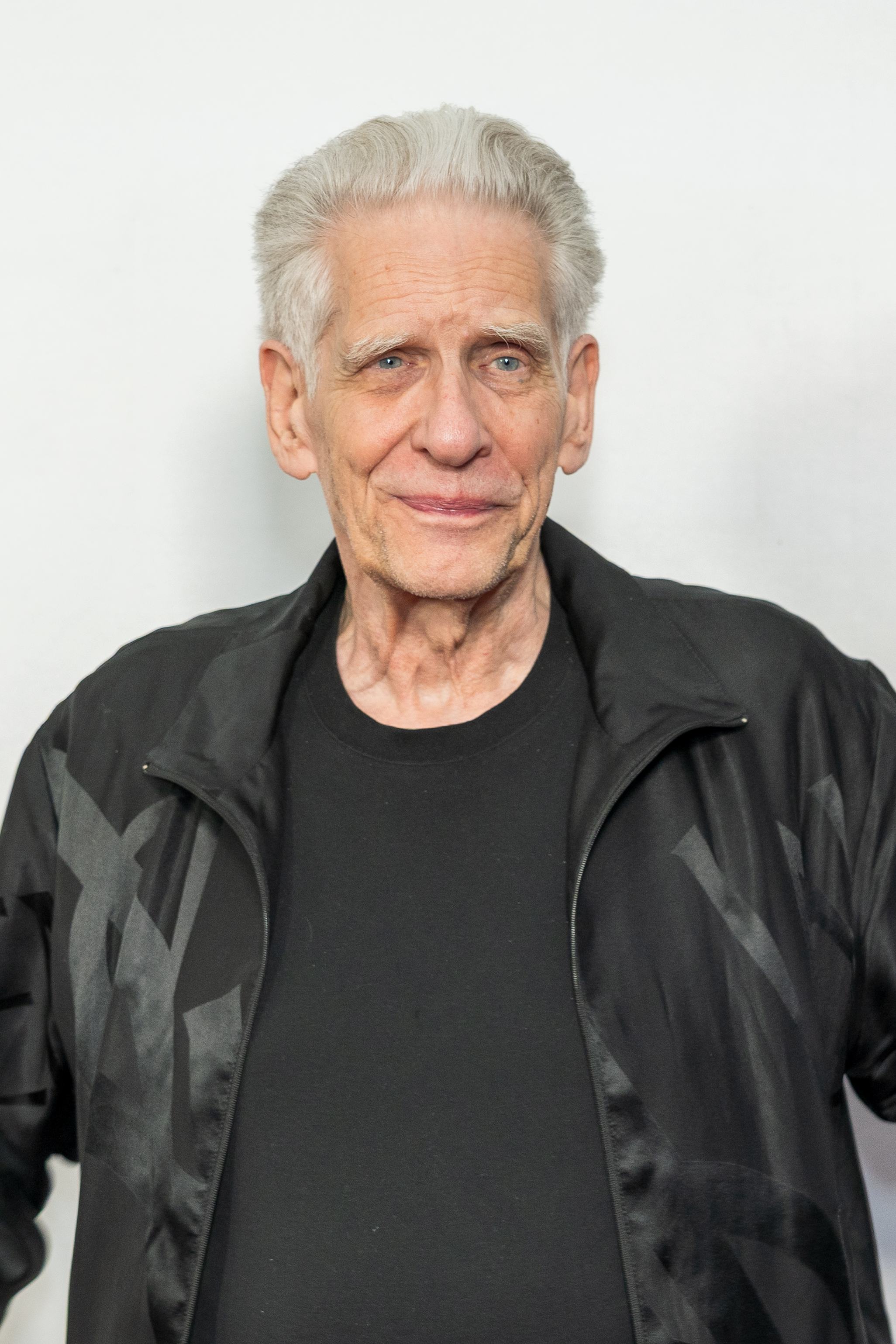
- Cronenberg in 2025
- Born: David Paul Cronenberg; March 15, 1943 (age 83); Toronto, Ontario, Canada
- Education: University of Toronto (BA)
- Occupations: Film director; screenwriter; producer; actor
- Years active: 1966–present
- Spouses: Margaret Hindson (m. 1972; div. 1979) Carolyn Zeifman (m. 1979; died 2017)
- Children: 3, including Brandon and Caitlin
- Relatives: Denise Cronenberg (sister); Aaron Woodley (nephew)

David Paul Cronenberg (born March 15, 1943) is a Canadian film director, screenwriter, producer and actor. Dubbed "Canada's King of Horror", he is a principal originator of the body horror genre, with his films exploring visceral bodily transformation, infectious diseases, and the intertwining of the psychological, physical, and technological. Cronenberg is best known for exploring these themes through science fiction horror films such as Shivers (1975), Rabid (1977), The Brood (1979), Scanners (1981), Videodrome (1983) and The Fly (1986), though he has also directed dramas, psychological thrillers and gangster films.

Cronenberg's films have polarized critics and audiences alike; he has earned critical acclaim and has sparked controversy for his depictions of gore and violence. The Village Voice called him "the most audacious and challenging narrative director in the English-speaking world". His films have won numerous awards, including the Special Jury Prize for Crash at the 1996 Cannes Film Festival, a unique award that is distinct from the Jury Prize as it is not given annually, but only at the request of the official jury, who in this case gave the award "for originality, for daring, and for audacity".

From the 2000s to the 2020s, Cronenberg collaborated on several films with Viggo Mortensen, including A History of Violence (2005), Eastern Promises (2007), A Dangerous Method (2011) and Crimes of the Future (2022). Seven of his films were selected to compete for the Palme d'Or at the Cannes Film Festival, the most recent being The Shrouds (2024).

== Early life and education ==
David Cronenberg was born in Toronto, Ontario, on March 15, 1943. Cronenberg is the son of Esther (née Sumberg), a musician, and Milton Cronenberg, a writer and editor. He was raised in a "middle-class progressive Jewish family". His father was born in Baltimore, Maryland, and his mother was born in Toronto; all of his grandparents were Jews from Lithuania. Milton wrote some short stories for True Detective and had a column in the Toronto Telegram for around thirty years. The Cronenberg household was full of a wide variety of books, and Cronenberg's father tried to introduce his son to art films such as The Seventh Seal, although at the time Cronenberg was more interested in western and pirate films, showing a particular affinity for those featuring Burt Lancaster.

A voracious reader from an early age, Cronenberg started off enjoying science fiction magazines like The Magazine of Fantasy & Science Fiction, Galaxy, and Astounding, where he first encountered authors who would prove influential on his own work, including Ray Bradbury and Isaac Asimov, although he would not encounter his primary influence, Philip K. Dick, until much later. Cronenberg also read comic books, noting his favorites were Tarzan, Little Lulu, Uncle Scrooge, Blackhawk, Plastic Man, Superman, and the original Fawcett Comics version of Captain Marvel, later known as Shazam. Although as an adult, Cronenberg feels superhero films are artistically limited, he maintains a fondness for Captain Marvel/Shazam, criticizing how he feels the character had been neglected. Cronenberg also read horror comics published by EC, which in contrast to the others, he described as "scary and bizarre and violent and nasty—the ones your mother didn't want you to have." He has cited William S. Burroughs and Vladimir Nabokov as influences.

Early films that later proved influential on Cronenberg's career include avant-garde, horror, science fiction, and thriller films, such as Un Chien Andalou, Vampyr, War of the Worlds, Freaks, Creature from the Black Lagoon, Alphaville, Performance, and Duel. He also cited less obvious films as influences, including comedies like The Bed Sitting Room, as well as Disney cartoons such as Bambi and Dumbo. Cronenberg said he found these two Disney animated films, as well as Universal's live-action Blue Lagoon, "terrifying" which influenced his approach to horror. Cronenberg went on to say that Bambi was the "first important film" he ever saw, citing the moment when Bambi's mother died as particularly powerful. Cronenberg even wished to screen Bambi as part of a museum exhibition of his influences, but Disney refused him permission. In terms of conventional horror films that frightened him, Cronenberg cited Don't Look Now.

Cronenberg attended Dewson Street Public School, Kent Senior School, Harbord Collegiate Institute and North Toronto Collegiate Institute. He enrolled at University College, University of Toronto for Honours Science in 1963, but changed to Honours English Language and Literature the next year. He graduated from university in 1967, at the top of his class with a general Bachelor of Arts. Cronenberg decided to not study for a master of arts after making Stereo.

Cronenberg's fascination with the film Winter Kept Us Warm (1966), by classmate David Secter, sparked his interest in film. He began frequenting film camera rental houses and learned the art of filmmaking. Cronenberg made two short films, Transfer and From the Drain, with a few hundred dollars. Cronenberg, Ivan Reitman, Bob Fothergill, and Iain Ewing were inspired by Jonas Mekas and formed the Toronto Film Co-op.

== Career ==
=== 1969–1979: Film debut and early work ===
After two short sketch films and two short art-house features (the black-and-white Stereo and the colour Crimes of the Future) Cronenberg went into partnership with Ivan Reitman. The Canadian government provided financing for his films throughout the 1970s. During this period, he focused on his signature "body horror" films such as Shivers (1975) and Rabid (1977), the latter of which provided pornographic actress Marilyn Chambers with work in a different genre, although Cronenberg's first choice for the role had been Sissy Spacek. Rabid was a breakthrough with international distributors, and his next horror feature, The Brood (1979), gained stronger support. Even then, he showed variety by making Fast Company (1979) between The Brood and Rabid, a project reflecting his interest in car racing and bike gangs.

=== 1981–1988: Breakthrough and acclaim ===
In 1981, Cronenberg directed the science-fiction horror film Scanners (1981). In it, "scanners" are psychics with unusual telepathic and telekinetic powers. The film has since become a cult classic. He followed it with another science-fiction horror film Videodrome (1983) starring James Woods. The film was distributed by Universal Pictures. Janet Maslin of The New York Times remarked on the film's "innovativeness", and praised Woods' performance as having a "sharply authentic edge". That same year he directed The Dead Zone (1983), based on Stephen King's novel of the same name, starring Christopher Walken.

Cronenberg directed The Fly (1986), starring Jeff Goldblum and Geena Davis. The film is loosely based on George Langelaan's 1957 short story of the same name and the 1958 film of the same name. It was distributed by 20th Century Fox and was a box office hit, making $60 million. Cronenberg has not generally worked within the world of big-budget, mainstream Hollywood filmmaking, although he has had occasional near misses. At one stage he was considered by George Lucas as a possible director for Return of the Jedi (1983) but turned down the offer. Peter Suschitzky was the director of photography for The Empire Strikes Back (1980), and Cronenberg remarked that Suschitzky's work in that film "was the only one of those movies that actually looked good", which was a motivating factor to work with him on Dead Ringers (1988).

Since Dead Ringers, Cronenberg has worked with Suschitzky on each of his films (see List of film director and cinematographer collaborations). Cronenberg has collaborated with composer Howard Shore on all of his films since The Brood (1979), with the exception of The Dead Zone (1983), which was scored by Michael Kamen. Other collaborators include actor Robert A. Silverman, art director Carol Spier (also his sister) sound editor Bryan Day, film editor Ronald Sanders, his sister, costume designer Denise Cronenberg, and, from 1979 until 1988, cinematographer Mark Irwin. In 2008, Cronenberg directed Shore's first opera, The Fly.

=== 1991–2002: Career fluctuations ===
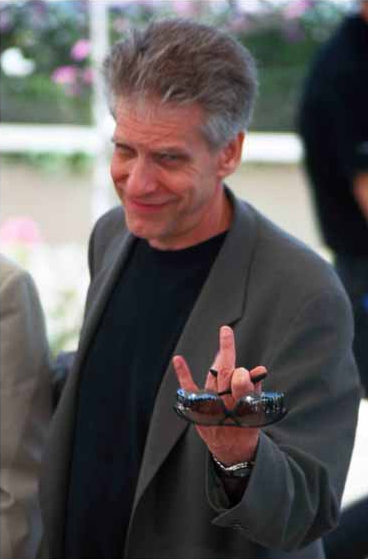
Cronenberg at the Cannes Film Festival in 2002

In 1991, Cronenberg adapted Naked Lunch (1959), his literary hero William S. Burroughs' most controversial book. The novel was considered "unfilmable", and Cronenberg acknowledged that a straight translation into film would "cost 400 million dollars and be banned in every country in the world". Instead he chose to blur the lines between what appeared to be reality and what appeared to be hallucinations brought on by the main character's drug addiction. Some of the book's "moments" (as well as incidents loosely based upon Burroughs' life) are presented in this manner within the film. Cronenberg said that while writing the screenplay for Naked Lunch (1991), he felt that his style and Burroughs' had synergized, and jokingly remarked that the connection between his screenwriting style and Burroughs' prose style was so strong, that should Burroughs pass on, he might write the next Burroughs novel.

Cronenberg has also appeared as an actor in other directors' films. Most of his roles are cameo appearances, as in the films Into the Night (1985), Blood and Donuts (1995), To Die For (1995), and Jason X (2002) and the television series Alias, but on occasion he has played major roles, as in Nightbreed (1990) and Last Night (1998). He has not had major roles in any of his own films, but he did put in a brief appearance as a gynecologist in The Fly; he can also be glimpsed among the sex-crazed hordes in Shivers; he can be heard as an unseen car-pound attendant in Crash; his hands can be glimpsed in eXistenZ (1999); and he appeared as a stand-in for James Woods in Videodrome.

Cronenberg has said that his films should be seen "from the point of view of the disease", and that in Shivers, for example, he identifies with the characters after they become infected with the anarchic parasites. Disease and disaster, in Cronenberg's work, are less problems to be overcome than agents of personal transformation. Of his characters' transformations, Cronenberg said, "But because of our necessity to impose our own structure of perception on things we look on ourselves as being relatively stable. But, in fact, when I look at a person I see this maelstrom of organic, chemical and electron chaos; volatility and instability, shimmering; and the ability to change and transform and transmute." Similarly, in Crash (1996), people who have been injured in car crashes attempt to view their ordeal as "a fertilizing rather than a destructive event". In 2005, Cronenberg publicly disagreed with Paul Haggis' choice of the same name for the latter's Oscar-winning film Crash (2004), arguing that it was "very disrespectful" to the "important and seminal" J. G. Ballard novel on which Cronenberg's film was based.

=== 2005–present: Resurgence ===
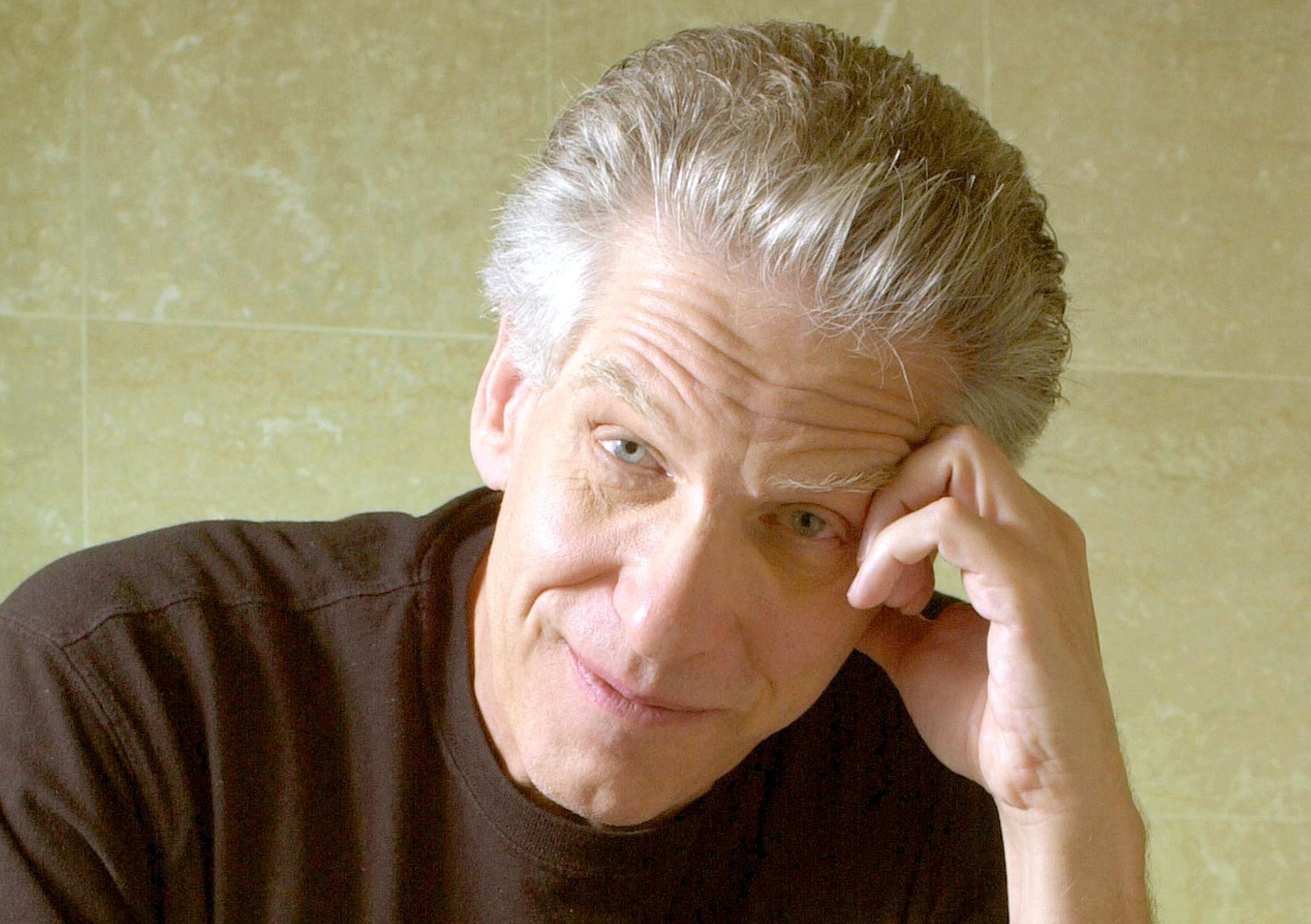
Cronenberg at the 2011 Toronto International Film Festival

His thriller A History of Violence (2005) is one of his highest budgeted and most accessible to date. He has said that the decision to direct it was influenced by his having had to defer some of his salary on the low-budgeted Spider (2002), but it was one of his most critically acclaimed films to date, along with Eastern Promises (2007), a film about the struggle of one man to gain power in the Russian Mafia. Although Cronenberg has worked with a number of Hollywood stars, he remains a staunchly Canadian filmmaker, with nearly all of his films (including major studio vehicles The Dead Zone and The Fly) having been filmed in his home province Ontario. Notable exceptions include M. Butterfly (1993), most of which was shot in China, Spider, and Eastern Promises (2007), which were both filmed primarily in England, and A Dangerous Method (2011), which was filmed in Germany and Austria. Rabid and Shivers were shot in and around Montreal. Most of his films have been at least partially financed by Telefilm Canada, and Cronenberg, a vocal supporter of government-backed film projects, has said: "Every country needs [a system of government grants] to have a national cinema in the face of Hollywood".

In 2008, Cronenberg realized two extra-cinematographic projects: the exhibition Chromosomes at the Rome Film Fest, and the opera The Fly at the LaOpera in Los Angeles and Theatre Châtelet in Paris. In July 2010, Cronenberg completed production on A Dangerous Method (2011), an adaptation of Christopher Hampton's play The Talking Cure, starring Keira Knightley, Michael Fassbender, Vincent Cassel, and frequent collaborator Viggo Mortensen. The film was produced by independent British producer Jeremy Thomas. On television, he has appeared in the recurring roles of Dr. Brezzel in Season 3 of Alias, and Kovich in seasons 3, 4, and 5 of Star Trek: Discovery. He has also had main roles as Reverend Verrenger in Alias Grace, and Spencer Galloway in Slasher: Flesh & Blood.

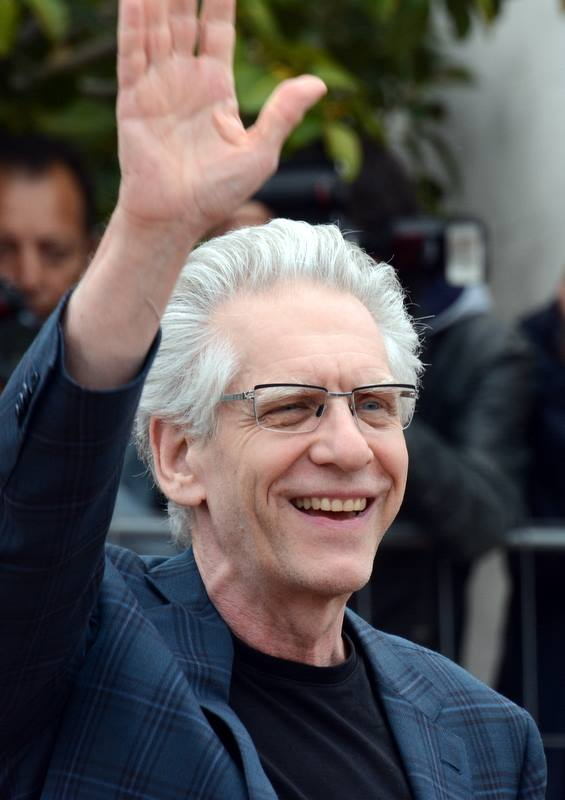
Cronenberg at the Cannes Film Festival in 2014

In 2012, his film Cosmopolis competed for the Palme d'Or at the 2012 Cannes Film Festival.

Filming for Cronenberg's next film, a satire drama entitled Maps to the Stars (2014)—with Julianne Moore, Mia Wasikowska, John Cusack, and Robert Pattinson—began on July 8, 2013, in Toronto, Ontario and Los Angeles. This was the first time Cronenberg filmed in the United States. On June 26, 2014, Cronenberg's short film The Nest was published on YouTube. The film was commissioned for "David Cronenberg – The Exhibition" at EYE Film Institute in Amsterdam and was available on YouTube for the duration of the exhibition, until September 14, 2014. Also in 2014, Cronenberg published his first novel, Consumed. In a May 2016 interview, Viggo Mortensen revealed that Cronenberg is considering retiring due to difficulty financing his film projects.

Cronenberg appears as himself in the minute-long short film The Death of David Cronenberg, shot by his daughter Caitlin, which was released digitally on September 19, 2021. In February 2021, Mortensen said Cronenberg had refined an older script he had written and hoped to film it with Mortensen that summer. He further hinted that it is a "strange film noir" and resembles Cronenberg's earlier body horror films. In April 2021, the title was revealed to be Crimes of the Future. It was shot in Greece during the summer of 2021, and competed for the Palme d'Or at the 2022 Cannes Film Festival. Cronenberg's next film The Shrouds premiered at the 2024 Cannes Film Festival in competition, and was released theatrically in September 2024.

In 2026, Cronenberg was featured on the song “No One Lasts Forever” on the Charli XCX album Music, Fashion, Film.

== Unrealized projects ==
One of Cronenberg's earliest unproduced film concepts was Roger Pagan, Gynecologist, about a neurotic man who impersonates a medical expert. The project was initially conceived in the early 1970s in the form of a novel.

In the early 1980s Cronenberg attempted to make a film adaptation of Mary Shelley's Frankenstein that took place in the modern day. Cronenberg wrote an original script for Universal after Videodrome titled Six Legs, but the film was never made, although aspects were incorporated into The Fly and Naked Lunch.

Since the 1980s, Cronenberg had planned on directing a film called Red Cars, about the 1961 Grand Prix automobile race won by Phil Hill. Unable to receive funding for the project, he adapted his screenplay in the form of an artbook, published in 2005.

Cronenberg was offered the role of director for Witness while it was under the name Come Home, but declined as he "could never be a fan of the Amish". He was also offered the director's position for Return of the Jedi, Flashdance, Top Gun, and Beverly Hills Cop. Marc Boyman offered Cronenberg the position of director for The Incubus, but declined although this led to Boyman producing The Fly and Dead Ringers.

In the mid-1980s, Cronenberg was signed on to direct The Hitchhiker's Guide to the Galaxy for Ivan Reitman, but he ended up doing The Fly instead.

Cronenberg worked for nearly a year on a version of Total Recall (1990), but had creative differences with producers Dino De Laurentiis and Ronald Shusett; a different version of the film was eventually made by Paul Verhoeven. Cronenberg related in his 1992 memoir, Cronenberg on Cronenberg that, as a fan of Philip K. Dick—author of "We Can Remember it For You Wholesale", the short story upon which the film was based— his dissatisfaction with what he envisioned the film to be and what it ended up being pained him so greatly that, for a time, he suffered a migraine just thinking about it, akin to a needle piercing his eye.

In 1993, Cronenberg signed a deal with Paragon Entertainment Corporation in which he would create a six-part television series called Crimes Against Nature for CBC Television. Cronenberg described the series as "William Burroughs meets Jean-Luc Godard's Alphaville." He started writing it on August 1, and filming was meant to begin in February 1994 using 35 mm film. The show was set in 2010 and was about members of the "Flesh Squad" police force. Carol Reynolds, the president of Paragon Entertainment, stated that each episode would cost between $500,000-600,000.

In the mid-1990s, he was attached to direct a version of American Psycho, with a screenplay adaptation by the author himself Bret Easton Ellis and with Brad Pitt starring in the role of Patrick Bateman. Cronenberg's vision of the film would have concluded with a musical number involving Barry Manilow's "Daybreak" and Bateman on the World Trade Center.

In 1998, author Patricia Anthony stated that Cronenberg would direct the adaptation of her novel Brother Termite written by John Sayles, and to be executive produced by James Cameron. The premise follows an alien race that co-exists with man on Earth, influencing human society.

In 1999, Cronenberg was reportedly interested in taking the helm of Charlie Kaufman's adaptation of Confessions of Dangerous Mind, with Sean Penn at that time circling to star. The following year, he was circling to direct Basic Instinct 2 for which he had a "good script" and Rupert Everett in the lead, but MGM said no because the actor is gay. At one stage, Cronenberg was going to make The Singing Detective as a horror film, with Al Pacino starring. In 2004, Cronenberg was attached to direct London Fields, based on Martin Amis' 1991 novel of the same name.

In the mid-2000s, Cronenberg had adapted and was planning to direct an adaptation of The White Hotel by D. M. Thomas.

For a time it appeared that, as Eastern Promises producer Paul Webster told Screen International, a sequel was in the works that would reunite the key team of Cronenberg, Steven Knight, and Viggo Mortensen. It was slated for production by Webster's new company Shoebox Films in collaboration with Focus Features, and shot in early 2013. In 2012, Cronenberg said the Eastern Promises sequel had fallen through due to budget disagreement with Focus Features.

In 2010, it was announced that Cronenberg would be directing an adaptation of As She Climbed Across the Table by Jonathan Lethem. The following year, Media Rights Capital picked up the project, with Bruce Wagner set to write the script.

In the October 2011 edition of Rue Morgue, Cronenberg stated that he has written a companion piece to his 1986 remake of The Fly, which he would like to direct if given the chance. He has stated that it is not a traditional sequel, but rather a "parallel story".

In March 2012, Media Rights Capital announced that Cronenberg would be directing and executive producing the television pilot Knifeman, adapted by Rolin Jones and Ron Fitzgerald from Wendy Moore's 2005 novel about a radical surgeon who goes to extraordinary lengths to uncover secrets of the human body.

In April 2012, the Los Angeles Times reported that Cronenberg was on Lionsgate's shortlist of candidates to direct The Hunger Games: Catching Fire alongside Alfonso Cuarón and Alejandro González Iñárritu.

As of 2022, Cronenberg was working to turn his novel Consumed into his next film.

== Personal life ==
Cronenberg lives in Toronto. He married his first wife, Margaret Hindson, in 1972: their seven-year marriage ended in 1979 amidst personal and professional differences. They had one daughter, Cassandra Cronenberg. His second wife was film editor Carolyn Zeifman, to whom he was married from 1979 until her death in 2017. The couple met on the set of Rabid while she was working as a production assistant. They have two children, Caitlin and Brandon. In the book Cronenberg on Cronenberg (1992), he revealed that The Brood was inspired by events that occurred during the unraveling of his first marriage, which caused both Cronenberg and his daughter Cassandra a great deal of turmoil. The character Nola Carveth, mother of the brood, is based on Cassandra's mother. Cronenberg said that he found the shooting of the climactic scene, in which Nola was strangled by her husband, to be "very satisfying".

In a September 2013 interview, Cronenberg revealed that film director Martin Scorsese admitted to him that he was intrigued by Cronenberg's early work but was subsequently "terrified" to meet him in person. Cronenberg responded to Scorsese: "You're the guy who made Taxi Driver and you're afraid to meet me?" In the same interview, Cronenberg identified as an atheist. "Anytime I've tried to imagine squeezing myself into the box of any particular religion, I find it claustrophobic and oppressive," Cronenberg elaborated. "I think atheism is an acceptance of what is real." In the same interview, Cronenberg revealed that it depends on the "time of day" as to whether he is afraid of death. He further stated that he is not concerned about posthumous representations of his film work: "It wouldn't disturb me to think that my work would just sink beneath the waves without trace and that would be it. So what? It doesn't bother me."

In Cronenberg on Cronenberg, the director further elaborated that he was raised in a secular Jewish home, and while he and his family had no disdain towards any religion, such matters were not discussed. In the same book, Cronenberg said that in his teens he went through a phase where he wondered about the existence of God, but ultimately came to the conclusion that the God concept was developed to cope with the fear of death. In a 2007 interview, Cronenberg explained the role atheism plays in his work. He stated, "I'm interested in saying, 'Let us discuss the existential question. We are all going to die, that is the end of all consciousness. There is no afterlife. There is no God. Now what do we do.' That's the point where it starts getting interesting to me."

In Cronenberg's later films (e.g. A History of Violence, Eastern Promises and A Dangerous Method) openly religious characters become more common. During an interview for A History of Violence, Cronenberg even chose to identify as a materialist rather than an atheist, stating, "I'm not an atheist, but for me to turn away from any aspect of the human body to me is a philosophical betrayal. And there's a lot of art and religion whose whole purpose is to turn away from the human body. I feel in my art that my mandate is to not do that."

Cronenberg has spoken against right-wing politics, especially in the United States, on multiple occasions, saying in 2022 that, "I think the U.S. has gone completely bananas, and I can't believe what the elected officials are saying, not just about Roe vs. Wade, so it is strange times." In a separate 2022 interview, he claimed that U.S. president Donald Trump "didn't deserve" to be addressed in his art. He also emphasized the importance of vaccines and called the notion of refusing a vaccine "ridiculous". Cronenberg has stated that he views all art, including his own films, as inherently political, regardless of a creator's intentions.

== Filmography ==
Directed features
Year	Title	Distribution
1969	Stereo	Film Canada Presentations
1970	Crimes of the Future	New Cinema Enterprises
1975	Shivers	Cinépix Film Properties
1977	Rabid	Cinépix Film Properties / New World Pictures
1979	Fast Company	Admit One Presentations / Danton Films
1979	The Brood	New World Pictures
1981	Scanners	New World Pictures / Manson International
1983	Videodrome	Universal Pictures
1983	The Dead Zone	Paramount Pictures
1986	The Fly	20th Century Fox
1988	Dead Ringers	20th Century Fox
1991	Naked Lunch	20th Century Fox
1993	M. Butterfly	Warner Bros.
1996	Crash	Alliance Communications
1999	eXistenZ	Alliance Atlantis
2002	Spider	Cineplex Films
2005	A History of Violence	New Line Cinema
2007	Eastern Promises	Focus Features
2011	A Dangerous Method	Sony Pictures Classics
2012	Cosmopolis	Entertainment One
2014	Maps to the Stars	Focus World
2022	Crimes of the Future	Sphere Films
2024	The Shrouds	Sphere Films

== Awards and recognition ==
Cronenberg has appeared on various "Greatest Director" lists. In 2004, Science Fiction magazine Strange Horizons named him the second greatest director in the history of the genre, ahead of better known directors such as Steven Spielberg, James Cameron, Jean-Luc Godard, and Ridley Scott. In the same year, The Guardian listed him 9th on their list of "The world's 40 best directors". In 2007, Total Film named him as the 17th greatest director of all time. Film professor Charles Derry, in his overview of the horror genre Dark Dreams, called the director one of the most important in his field, and that "no discussion of contemporary horror film can conclude without reference to the films of David Cronenberg."

Cronenberg received the Special Jury Prize at the 1996 Cannes Film Festival for Crash. In 1999, he was inducted onto Canada's Walk of Fame, awarded the Silver Bear Award at the 49th Berlin International Film Festival. and that November received the Governor General's Performing Arts Award, Canada's highest honour in the performing arts.

In 2002, he was made an Officer of the Order of Canada, and was promoted to Companion of the Order of Canada (the order's highest rank) in 2014. In 2006 he was awarded the Cannes Film Festival's lifetime achievement award, the Carrosse d'Or. In 2009 Cronenberg received the Légion d'honneur from the government of France. The following year Cronenberg was named an honorary patron of the University Philosophical Society, Trinity College Dublin. In 2012, he received the Queen Elizabeth II Diamond Jubilee Medal.

The opening of the "David Cronenberg: Evolution" Toronto International Film Festival (TIFF) exhibition occurred on October 30, 2013. Held at the TIFF Bell Lightbox venue, the exhibition paid tribute to the director's entire filmmaking career and the festival's promotional material referred to Cronenberg as "one of Canada's most prolific and iconic filmmakers". The exhibition was shown internationally following the conclusion of the TIFF showing on January 19, 2014.

In 2014, he was made a Member of the Order of Ontario in recognition for being "Canada's most celebrated internationally acclaimed filmmaker".

In April 2018, it was announced that Cronenberg would receive the honorary Golden Lion at the 75th Venice International Film Festival.

Organizations	Year	Category	Work	Result
British Academy Film Awards	2008	Outstanding British Film	Eastern Promises	Nominated
Berlin International Film Festival	1992	Golden Bear	Naked Lunch	Nominated
Berlin International Film Festival	1999	Golden Bear	eXistenZ	Nominated
Berlin International Film Festival	1999	Silver Bear	eXistenZ	Won
Cannes Film Festival	1996	Jury Prize	Crash	Won
Cannes Film Festival	1996	Palme d'Or	Crash	Nominated
Cannes Film Festival	2002	Palme d'Or	Spider	Nominated
Cannes Film Festival	2005	Palme d'Or	A History of Violence	Nominated
Cannes Film Festival	2006	Golden Coach		Won
Cannes Film Festival	2012	Palme d'Or	Cosmopolis	Nominated
Cannes Film Festival	2014	Palme d'Or	Maps to the Stars	Nominated
Cannes Film Festival	2022	Palme d'Or	Crimes of the Future	Nominated
Cannes Film Festival	2024	Palme d'Or	The Shrouds	Nominated
Canadian Screen Awards	1981	Best Director	Scanners	Nominated
Canadian Screen Awards	1981	Best Screenplay	Scanners	Nominated
Canadian Screen Awards	1983	Best Director	Videodrome	Won
Canadian Screen Awards	1983	Best Screenplay	Videodrome	Nominated
Canadian Screen Awards	1988	Best Picture	Dead Ringers	Won
Canadian Screen Awards	1988	Best Director	Dead Ringers	Won
Canadian Screen Awards	1988	Best Screenplay	Dead Ringers	Won
Canadian Screen Awards	1991	Best Director	Naked Lunch	Won
Canadian Screen Awards	1991	Best Screenplay	Naked Lunch	Won
Canadian Screen Awards	1996	Best Picture	Crash	Nominated
Canadian Screen Awards	1996	Best Director	Crash	Won
Canadian Screen Awards	1996	Best Screenplay	Crash	Won
Canadian Screen Awards	1999	Best Picture	eXistenZ	Nominated
Canadian Screen Awards	2002	Best Director	Spider	Won
Canadian Screen Awards	2007	Best Director	Eastern Promises	Nominated
Canadian Screen Awards	2011	Best Director	A Dangerous Method	Nominated
Canadian Screen Awards	2012	Best Screenplay	Cosmopolis	Nominated
Canadian Screen Awards	2014	Best Director	Maps to the Stars	Nominated
Saturn Awards	1983	Best Director	The Dead Zone	Nominated
Saturn Awards	1986	Best Director	The Fly	Nominated
Saturn Awards	1988	Best Horror Film	Dead Ringers	Nominated
Saturn Awards	1988	Best Writing	Dead Ringers	Nominated
Saturn Awards	1999	Best Science Fiction Film	eXistenZ	Nominated

Directed Academy Award performances
Under Cronenberg's direction, these actors have received Academy Award nominations for their performances in their respective roles.

Year	Performer	Film	Result
Academy Award for Best Actor
2007	Viggo Mortensen	Eastern Promises	Nominated
Academy Award for Best Supporting Actor
2005	William Hurt	A History of Violence	Nominated

== See also ==
- List of atheists in film, radio, television and theater

== Bibliography ==
- Cronenberg, David (1992). Rodley, Chris (ed.). Cronenberg on Cronenberg (1st ed.). Faber & Faber. ISBN 978-0-571-14436-5.
- Cronenberg, David (1997). Crash. Faber and Faber. ISBN 0-571-19127-4.
- Cronenberg, David (1999). eXistenZ: A Graphic Novel. Key Porter Books. ISBN 1-55263-027-7.
- Cronenberg, David (2002). David Cronenberg: Collected Screenplays 1: Stereo, Crimes of the Future, Shivers, Rabid. Faber and Faber. ISBN 0-571-21017-1.
- Cronenberg, David (2005). Red Cars. Volumina Artbooks. Bologna, Italia: Associazione culturale Volumina. ISBN 978-88-901996-8-4.
- Cronenberg, David (2014). Consumed: A Novel. Scribner. ISBN 978-1-416-59613-4.
- Grünberg, Serge & Cronenberg, David (2005). David Cronenberg: Interviews with Serge Grünberg. Plexus Publishing. ISBN 0-85965-376-5.
- Rodley, Chris, ed. (1997). Cronenberg on Cronenberg. Faber and Faber. ISBN 0571191371.
- Dreibrodt, Thomas J. Dreibrodt (2000). Lang lebe das neue Fleisch. Die Filme von David Cronenberg – von 'Shivers' bis 'eXistenZ' (in German). Paragon-Verlag. ISBN 978-3-932872-05-1.
- Handling, Piers (1983). The Shape of Rage: The Films of David Cronenberg. General Publishing Company. ISBN 978-0-7736-1137-5.
- Humm, Maggie (1997). "Cronenberg's Films and Feminist Theories of Mothering". Feminism and Film. Edinburgh University Press. ISBN 978-0-253-21146-0.
- Newman, Kim (1989). Nightmare Movies: A Critical History of the Horror Film 1968–1988. Harmony Books. ISBN 978-0-517-57366-2.
- Robnik, Drehli Robnik; Palm, Michael, eds. (1992). Und das Wort ist Fleisch geworden. Texte über Filme von David Cronenberg. Vienna: PVS. ISBN 978-3-901196-02-7.
