= Alien vs. Predator (film) =

2004 film by Paul W. S. Anderson

- Theatrical release poster
- Directed by: Paul W. S. Anderson
- Screenplay by: Paul W. S. Anderson
- Story by: Paul W. S. Anderson; Dan O'Bannon; Ronald Shusett
- Based on: Alien characters by; Dan O'Bannon; Ronald Shusett; Predator characters by; Jim Thomas; John Thomas
- Produced by: John Davis; Gordon Carroll; David Giler; Walter Hill
- Starring: Sanaa Lathan; Raoul Bova; Lance Henriksen; Ewen Bremner
- Cinematography: David Johnson
- Edited by: Alexander Berner
- Music by: Harald Kloser
- Production companies: 20th Century Fox; Davis Entertainment; Brandywine Productions; Impact Pictures; Stillking Films
- Distributed by: 20th Century Fox
- Release dates: 12 August 2004 (International); 13 August 2004 (United States)
- Running time: 101 minutes
- Countries: United States; United Kingdom; Czech Republic; Canada; Germany (Note: Alien vs. Predator is listed as a co-production between the United States, the United Kingdom, the Czech Republic, Canada, and Germany.)
- Language: English
- Budget: $60–70 million
- Box office: $177 million

Alien vs. Predator (stylized on-screen as AVP: Alien vs. Predator) is a 2004 science fiction horror film written and directed by Paul W. S. Anderson. It is the first installment in the Alien vs. Predator franchise and stars Sanaa Lathan, Raoul Bova, Lance Henriksen, Ewen Bremner, Colin Salmon, and Tommy Flanagan. In the film, an expedition team is caught in the crossfire of an ancient battle between Aliens and Predators as it attempts to escape a pyramid buried beneath Bouvet Island.

It adapts a crossover bringing together the creatures of the Alien and Predator series, a concept which originated in a 1989 comic book written by Randy Stradley and Chris Warner. Anderson wrote the story, with the creators of the Alien franchise, Dan O'Bannon and Ronald Shusett receiving additional story credit due to the incorporation of elements from the Alien series, and Anderson and Shane Salerno adapted the story into a screenplay. Their writing was influenced by Aztec mythology, the comic book series, and the writings of Erich von Däniken.

Alien vs. Predator was theatrically released by 20th Century Fox on 13 August 2004. The film received generally negative reviews from critics but was a commercial success, grossing $177.4 million worldwide against a production budget of $60–70 million. It has garnered a cult following. Due to the film's commercial success, the film was followed by a sequel titled Aliens vs. Predator: Requiem; the sequel was released in 2007 to similarly negative critical reception.

== Plot ==
A satellite detects a heat bloom beneath Bouvet Island, an island about 1,000 mi (1,600 km) off the coast of Antarctica. Wealthy industrialist Charles Bishop Weyland discovers through thermal imaging that there is a pyramid buried 2,000 ft (610 m) beneath the ice. He assembles a team of experts to investigate, including archaeologists, linguists, mercenaries, and mountaineering guide Lex Woods. Terminally ill, Weyland desires to claim the discovery in his name. Meanwhile, a Predator ship arrives at Earth and uses a heating device to melt a hole in the ice.

When the team arrives at the abandoned whaling station, they find a newly made tunnel running directly from the ice's surface toward the pyramid beneath. The team descends the tunnel and begins to explore the pyramid, soon finding evidence of an ancient civilization and what appears to be a sacrificial chamber filled with human skeletons that all have ruptured rib cages.

Meanwhile, three Predators – Scar, Celtic, and Chopper – arrive and kill the remaining team members on the surface. They make their way down to the pyramid and arrive just as the team unwittingly activates the structure and is trapped within it. A captured Xenomorph Queen is awakened from cryogenic stasis and begins to produce eggs. When the eggs hatch, several facehuggers attach themselves to several of the team members trapped in the sacrificial chamber. Chestbursters emerge from the humans and quickly grow into adult Xenomorphs. The humans take possession of the Predators' Plasmacasters, and conflict erupts between the Predators, Xenomorphs, and humans. Chopper is killed by a Xenomorph named Grid, and after an intense battle, Celtic is killed too. Weyland buys Lex and Italian archaeologist Sebastian De Rosa enough time to escape from Scar, who initially spares him due to his illness. After attempting to challenge Scar by using a flare and his oxygen breather as a makeshift flamethrower, Weyland is killed. The two witness Scar kill a facehugger and a Xenomorph before unmasking and marking both his mask and forehead with the acidic blood of the facehugger. After Lex and Sebastian leave, another facehugger attacks Scar.

Through translation of the pyramid's hieroglyphs, Lex and Sebastian learn that the Predators have been visiting Earth for millennia. They taught the early human civilization how to build pyramids and were worshipped as gods. Once a century, they visit Earth to take part in a rite of passage by which several humans sacrifice themselves as hosts for the Xenomorphs, creating the "ultimate prey" for the Predators to hunt. As a fail-safe, if overwhelmed, the Predators would activate a self-destruct device to eliminate the Xenomorphs. They deduce that the Predators lured them into the pyramid to use as a sacrifice.

Lex and Sebastian decide that the Predators must be allowed to succeed so that the Xenomorphs do not escape to the surface. Sebastian is captured by Grid, and Lex gives Scar a Plasmacaster. They are attacked by a Xenomorph, and Lex manages to kill it. Impressed, Scar uses parts of the alien's corpse to fashion a sword and shield for Lex, and the two strike up an alliance. Lex finds Sebastian, who has become the host of a Xenomorph. She mercy kills him with a pistol, but the Xenomorph Queen is freed from her restraints and, along with the other Xenomorphs, begin to pursue Lex and Scar. Scar detaches and uses the bomb in his Wrist Gauntlet to destroy the pyramid and the remaining Xenomorphs and their eggs. Lex and Scar reach the surface, and Scar uses acidic Xenomorph blood to mark Lex with the Xenomorph hunter symbol. The Xenomorph Queen reappears and attacks them, but they defeat the Queen by hooking her chains to a water tank and pushing her over a cliff to sink to the ocean floor under the tank's weight; Scar is mortally wounded in the battle when the Queen impales him through the back with her tail.

A Predator spaceship appears, and its crew retrieves its fallen comrade. An elder Predator sees the hunter scar on Lex's face and gives her his spear as a gift as the spaceship departs; Lex walks over to a snowcat and leaves the area. On the Predator spaceship, Scar's body is placed at rest in front of a window by his comrades when a Predalien chestburster erupts from his chest.

== Cast ==
- Sanaa Lathan as Alexa "Lex" Woods, an experienced guide who spent several seasons exploring Arctic and Antarctic environments. She is loosely based on Machiko Noguchi from the four-book series.
- Raoul Bova as Professor Sebastian De Rosa, an Italian archaeologist and member of the exploration team who is able to translate the pyramid's hieroglyphs.
- Lance Henriksen as Charles Bishop Weyland, the billionaire head of Weyland Corporation and its subsidiary, Weyland Industries, who organizes the expedition.
- Ewen Bremner as Dr. Graeme Miller, a Scottish chemical engineer, the main scientist of the exploration team.
- Colin Salmon as Maxwell Stafford, assistant to Mr. Weyland and ex-British Special Forces officer.
- Tommy Flanagan as Mark Verheiden, a member of the armed escort that accompanies the exploration team.
- Carsten Norgaard as Rusten Quinn, head of the drilling team.
- Joseph Rye as Joe Connors, a member of the armed escort that accompanies the exploration team.
- Agathe de La Boulaye as Adele Rousseau, a member of the armed escort that accompanies the exploration team.
- Sam Troughton as Thomas Parks, the second archaeologist of the exploration team, De Rosa's assistant.
- Petr Jákl as Stone, a member of the armed escort that accompanies the exploration team.
- Liz May Brice as The Supervisor at the Nebraska satellite receiving station that detects the heat bloom in Antarctica.
- Karima Adebibe as a Sacrificial Maiden in the flashback to the ancient era.
- Tom Woodruff Jr. as The Alien / "Grid". The Alien played by Woodruff is listed in the film's credits as Grid, referencing crosshatch scars from Predator net constriction in the battle with the Predator called "Celtic".
  - Woodruff Jr. and his Amalgamated Dynamics partner Alec Gillis also have uncredited cameos as technicians in the satellite tracking station.
- Ian Whyte as The Predator / "Scar", one of the three main Predators who come to Earth to create and hunt Aliens within the pyramid as a rite of passage. Whyte played the lead Predator, called Scar in the film's credits due to the Predator marking himself with the Alien's acidic blood. He is loosely based on Dachande from the book series.
  - Whyte also played the other three Predators: "Chopper", "Celtic", and "Elder" (leader of the Predators at the end of the film).

== Production ==
=== Fifth Alien film and sequel ===
Before 20th Century Fox gave Alien vs. Predator the greenlight, Aliens writer/director James Cameron had been working on a story for a fifth Alien film. Alien director Ridley Scott had talked with Cameron, stating "I think it would be a lot of fun, but the most important thing is to get the story right." In a 2002 interview, Scott's concept for a story was "to go back to where the alien creatures were first found and explain how they were created"; this project eventually became Scott's film Prometheus (2012). On learning that Fox intended to pursue Alien vs. Predator, Cameron believed the film would "kill the validity of the franchise" and ceased work on his story, "To me, that was Frankenstein Meets Werewolf. It was Universal just taking their assets and starting to play them off against each other...Milking it." After viewing Alien vs. Predator, Cameron remarked that "it was actually pretty good. I think of the five Alien films, I'd rate it third. I actually liked it. I actually liked it a lot." Conversely, Ridley Scott had no interest in the Alien vs. Predator films. When asked in May 2012 if he had watched them, Scott laughed, "No. I couldn't do that. I couldn't quite take that step." Director Neill Blomkamp would eventually go on to pitch his sequel to Aliens. However, Scott stated in 2017 that the project has been cancelled.

=== Development ===
The concept of Alien vs. Predator originated from the Aliens versus Predator comic book in 1989 and subsequent novelisations and novels. It was also hinted at when an Alien skull appeared in a trophy case aboard the Predator ship in Predator 2. Shortly after the release of Predator 2, Predator co-writer Jim Thomas discussed the possibilities of a Predator franchise and commented on the prospect of a crossover film, stating, "I think Predator vs. Alien is a good idea that will probably never happen". Screenwriter Peter Briggs created the original spec screenplay in 1990–1991, which was based on the first comic series. In 1991, he successfully pitched the concept to 20th Century Fox, who owned the film franchises, although the company did not move forward with the project until 2002; a video game produced by Capcom as a tie-in to the unmade film saw independent release in 1994. The project was delayed chiefly because the studio was working on Alien Resurrection. A draft penned by James DeMonaco and Kevin Fox described as "pretty much word-for-word like the Dark Horse comic book" was rejected by producer John Davis, who hoped to give the film an original approach by setting it on Earth.

As there were six producers between the film franchises, Davis had difficulty securing the rights as the producers were worried about a film featuring the two creatures. Paul W. S. Anderson pitched Davis a story he worked on for eight years, adapting the Machiko Noguchi series, and showed him concept art created by Randy Bowen. Impressed with Anderson's idea, Davis thought the story was like Jaws in that it "just drew you in, it drew you in". Anderson started to work on the film after completing the script for Resident Evil: Apocalypse, with Shane Salerno co-writing. Salerno spent six months writing the shooting script, finished its development, and stayed on for revisions throughout the film's production. Dan O'Bannon and Ronald Shusett received story credit on the film based on elements from their work on the original Alien.

=== Story and setting ===
Influenced by the work of Erich von Däniken and Aztec mythology, Anderson had the Predators come to Earth in spaceships and teach humans how to build pyramids. As a result, they were treated as gods.

Early reports claimed the story was about humans who tried to lure Predators with Alien eggs, although the idea was scrapped. Influenced by the work of Erich von Däniken, Anderson researched von Däniken's theories on how he believed early civilizations were able to construct massive pyramids with the help of aliens, an idea long debunked and based on misinterpretations of Aztec mythology. Anderson wove these ideas into Alien vs. Predator, describing a scenario in which Predators taught ancient humans to build pyramids and used Earth for rite of passage rituals every 100 years in which they would hunt Aliens. To explain how these ancient civilisations "disappeared without a trace", Anderson came up with the idea that the Predators, if overwhelmed by the Aliens, would use their self-destruct weapons to kill everything in the area. H. P. Lovecraft's novella At the Mountains of Madness (1931) served as an inspiration for the film, and several elements of the Aliens vs. Predator comic series were included. Anderson's initial script called for five Predators to appear in the film, although the number was later reduced to three.

As Alien vs. Predator was intended to be a sequel to the Predator films and prequel to the Alien series, Anderson was cautious of contradicting continuity in the franchises. He chose to set the film on the remote Norwegian Antarctic island of Bouvet, commenting, "It's definitely the most hostile environment on Earth and probably the closest to an Alien surface you can get." Anderson thought that setting the film in an urban environment like New York City would break continuity with the Alien series as the protagonist, Ellen Ripley, had no knowledge the creatures existed. "You can't have an Alien running around the city now, because it would've been written up and everyone will know about it. So there's nothing in this movie that contradicts anything that already exists."

After the film's release, James Muller, a writer who alleged that the screenplay was copied from one he had written eight years earlier sued the studio, the production company and Anderson for copyright infringement. In 2011 federal judge Denny Chin for the United States District Court for the Southern District of New York dismissed the case, holding that no reasonable jury was likely to find anything more than coincidental similarity between the two scripts besides elements so common to the genre as not to be copyrightable. Finding Muller's suit "frivolous and objectively unreasonable", Chin also awarded Fox $40,000 in legal fees.

=== Casting ===
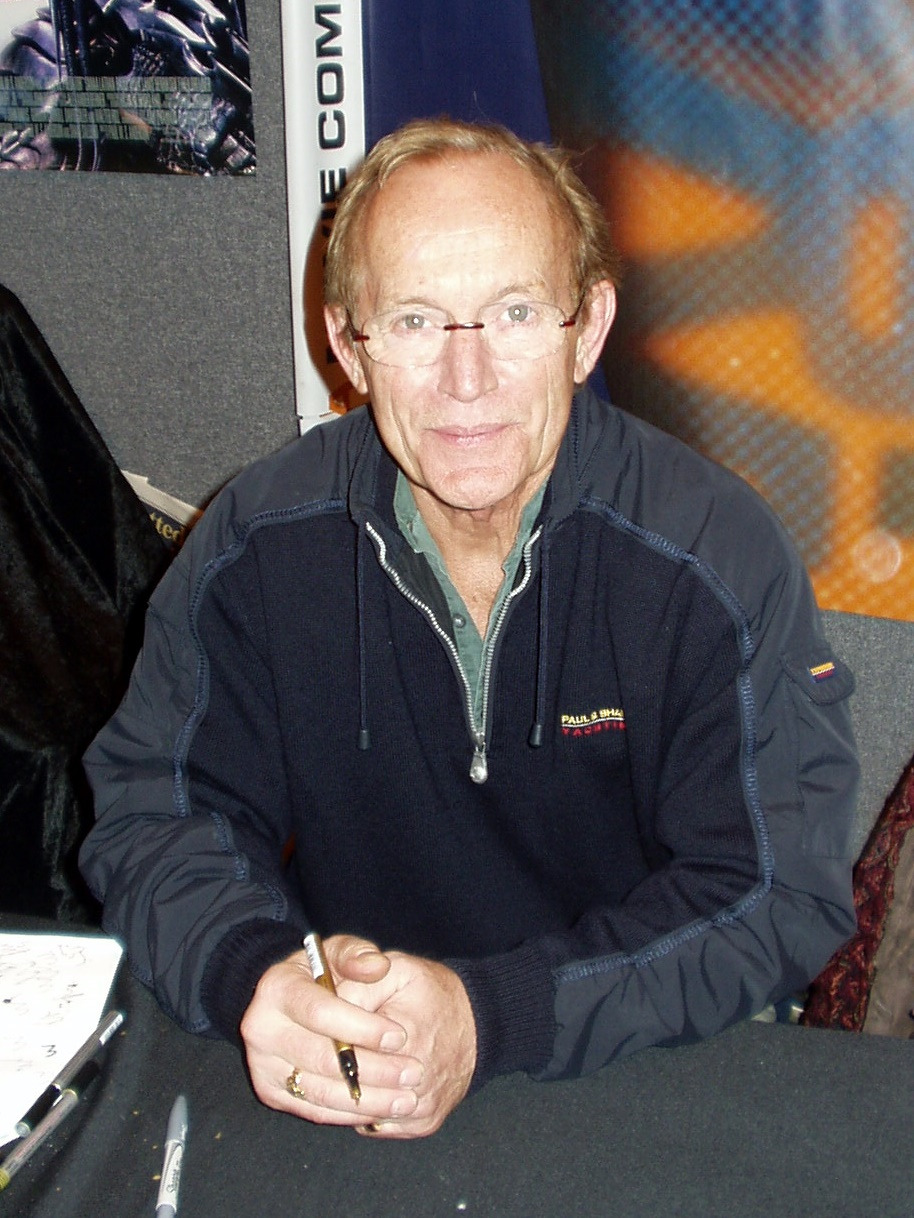
Lance Henriksen was the first to be cast in Alien vs. Predator, as Anderson wanted to keep continuity with the Alien series.

The first actor to be cast for Alien vs. Predator was Lance Henriksen, who played the character Bishop in Aliens and Alien 3. Although the Alien films are set hundreds of years in the future, Anderson wanted to keep continuity with the series by including a familiar actor. Henriksen plays billionaire and self-taught-engineer Charles Bishop Weyland, a character that ties in with the Weyland-Yutani Corporation as the original founder and CEO of Weyland Industries. According to Anderson, Weyland becomes known for the discovery of the pyramid, and as a result the Weyland-Yutani Corporation models the Bishop android in the Alien films after him; "when the Bishop android is created in 150 years time, it's created with the face of the creator. It's kind of like Microsoft building an android in 100 years time that has the face of Bill Gates."

Anderson opted for a European cast including Italian actor Raoul Bova, Ewen Bremner from Scotland, and English actor Colin Salmon. Producer Davis said, "There's a truly international flavor to the cast, and gives the film a lot of character." Several hundred actresses attended the auditions to be cast as the film's heroine Alexa Woods, loosely based on the comic and novel protagonist Machiko Noguchi. Sanaa Lathan was selected, and one week later she flew to Prague to begin filming. The filmmakers knew there would be comparisons to Alien heroine Ellen Ripley and did not want a clone of the character, but wanted to make her similar while adding something different.

Anderson reported in an interview that California Governor Arnold Schwarzenegger was willing to reprise his role as Major Alan "Dutch" Schaeffer from Predator in a short cameo appearance if he lost the 2003 recall election on condition that the filming should take place at his residence. Schwarzenegger, however, won the election with 48.58% of the votes and was unavailable to participate in Alien vs. Predator. Actress Sigourney Weaver, who starred as Ellen Ripley in the Alien series, said she was happy not to be in the film, as a possible crossover was "the reason I wanted my character to die in the first place", and thought the concept "sounded awful".

=== Filming and set designs ===
Production began in late 2003 at Barrandov Studios in Prague, Czech Republic, where most of the filming took place. Production designer Richard Bridgland was in charge of sets, props and vehicles, based on early concept art Anderson had created to give a broad direction of how things would look. 25 to 30 life-sized sets were constructed at Barrandov Studios, many of which were interiors of the pyramid. The pyramid's carvings, sculptures, and hieroglyphs were influenced by Egyptian, Cambodian, and Aztec civilisations, while the regular shifting of the pyramid's rooms was meant to evoke a sense of claustrophobia similar to the original Alien film. According to Anderson, if he was to build the sets in Los Angeles they would have cost $20 million. However, in Prague they cost $2 million, an important factor when the film's budget was less than $50 million.

Third scale miniatures several meters in height were created to give the film the effect of realism, rather than relying on computer generated imagery (CGI). For the whaling station miniatures and life-sized sets, over 700 bags of artificial snow were used (roughly 15–20 tons). A 4.5-meter miniature of an icebreaker with working lights and a mechanical moving radar was created, costing almost $37,000 and taking 10 weeks to create. Visual effects producer Arthur Windus, claimed miniatures were beneficial in the filming process: "With computer graphics, you need to spend a lot of time making it real. With a miniature, you shoot it and its there." A scale 25-meter miniature of the whaling station was created in several months. It was designed so the model could be collapsed and then reconstructed, which proved beneficial for a six-second shot which required a re-shoot.

=== Visual effects and creatures ===
A hydraulic Alien was used to film six scenes as it was faster than a man in a suit. The puppet required six people to operate it.

Special effects company Amalgamated Dynamics, Inc. (ADI) was hired for the film, having previously worked on Alien 3 and Alien Resurrection. Visual and special effects producers Arthur Windus and John Bruno were in charge of the project, which contained 400 effects shots. ADI founders Alec Gillis, Tom Woodruff Jr. and members of their company, began designing costumes, miniatures and effects in June 2003. For five months the creatures were redesigned, the Predators wrist blades being extended roughly four times longer than those in the Predator films, and a larger mechanical plasma caster was created for the Scar Predator.

The basic shape of the Predator mask was kept, although technical details were added and each Predator was given a unique mask to distinguish them from each other. These masks were created using clay, which was used to form moulds to create fiberglass copies. These copies were painted to give a weathered look, which Woodruff claims "is what the Predator is all about". A hydraulic Alien puppet was created so ADI would be able to make movements faster and give the Alien a "slimline and skeletal" appearance, rather than using an actor in a suit. The puppet required six people to run it; one for the head and body, two for the arms, and a sixth to make sure the signals were reaching the computer. Movements were recorded in the computer so that puppeteers would be able to repeat moves that Anderson liked. The puppet was used in six shots, including the fight scene with the Predator which took one month to film.

The crew tried to keep CGI use to a minimum, as Anderson said people in suits and puppets are scarier than CGI monsters as they are "there in the frame". Roughly 70% of scenes were created using suits, puppets, and miniatures. The Alien queen was filmed using three variations: a 4.8-meter practical version, a 1.2-meter puppet, and a computer-generated version. The practical version required 12 puppeteers to operate, and CGI tails were added to the Aliens and the queen as they were difficult to animate using puppetry. The queen alien's inner-mouth was automated though, and was powered by a system of hydraulics. Anderson praised Alien director Ridley Scott's and Predator director John McTiernan's abilities at building suspense by not showing the creatures until late in the film, something Anderson wanted to accomplish with Alien vs. Predator. "Yes, we make you wait 45 minutes, but once it goes off, from there until the end of the movie, it's fucking relentless".

== Music ==
Austrian composer Harald Kloser was hired to create the film's score. After completing the score for The Day After Tomorrow, Kloser was chosen by Anderson as he is a fan of the franchises. It was recorded in London and Prague, and was primarily orchestral as Anderson commented, "this is a terrifying movie and it needs a terrifying, classic movie score to go with it; at the same time it's got huge action so it needs that kind of proper orchestral support."

The score album was released on iTunes on 9 August 2004, and on CD on 31 August 2004 and received mixed reviews. James Christopher Monger of Allmusic thought Kloser introduced electronic elements well, and called "Alien vs. Predator Main Theme a particularly striking and serves as a continuous creative source for the composer to dip his baton in." Mike Brennan of Soundtrack, however, said it "lacks the ingenuity of the previous trilogy (Alien) and the Predator scores, which all shared a strong sense of rhythm in place of thematic content. Kloser throws in some interesting percussion cues ("Antarctica" and "Down the Tunnel"), but more as a sound effect than a consistent motif." John Fallon of JoBlo.com compared it to character development in the film, "too generic to completely engage or leave a permanent impression."

== Release ==
=== Home media ===
Alien vs. Predator was released on VHS, DVD, and PSP UMD Movies in North America on 25 January 2005. The DVD contained two audio commentaries. The first featured Paul W. S. Anderson, Lance Henriksen, and Sanaa Lathan, while the second included special effects supervisor John Bruno and ADI founders Alec Gillis and Tom Woodruff. A 25-minute "Making of" featurette and a Dark Horse AVP comic cover gallery were included in the special features along with three deleted scenes from the film. On release, Alien vs. Predator debuted at number 1 on the Top DVD Sales and Top Video Rental charts in North America.

A two-disc "Extreme Edition" was released on 7 March 2005, featuring behind the scenes footage of the film. An "Unrated Edition" was released on 22 November 2005, containing the same special features as the Extreme Edition as well as an extra eight minutes of footage in the film. John J. Puccio of DVD Town remarked that the extra footage contained "a few more shots of blood, gore, guts, and slime to spice things up...and tiny bits of connecting matter to help us follow the story line better, but none of it amounts to much."

== Reception ==
=== Box office ===
Alien vs. Predator grossed $80.3 million in the United States and Canada, and $97.1 million in other territories, for a worldwide total of $177.4 million. Deadline Hollywood reported the film was "extremely profitable" for the studio.

The film was released in North America on August 13, 2004, in 3,395 theaters, and grossed $38.2 million in its opening weekend (an average of $11,278 per venue), finishing first at the box office. The film spent 16 weeks in theaters. It grossed $9 million in the United Kingdom, $16 million in Japan, and $8 million in Germany. It ranks third behind Aliens and Prometheus at the domestic box office, and at the time was the highest-grossing film of both the Predator and Alien franchises (and to-date is the fourth best total, behind Alien: Romulus, Predator: Badlands and Prometheus).

=== Critical response ===
On Rotten Tomatoes, the film has a rating of 21% based on 146 reviews with an average rating of 4.3/10. The website's consensus reads: "Gore without scares and cardboard cut-out characters make this clash of the monsters a dull sit." On Metacritic the film has a weighted average score of 29 out of 100, based on 21 critics, indicating "generally unfavorable" reviews. Audiences polled by CinemaScore gave the film an average grade of "B" on an A+ to F scale.

Rick Kisonak of Film Threat praised the film stating, "For a big dumb production about a movie monster smackdown, Alien vs. Predator is a surprisingly good time". Ian Grey of the Orlando Weekly felt, "Anderson clearly relished making this wonderful, utterly silly film; his heart shows in every drip of slime." Staci Layne Wilson of Horror.com called it "a pretty movie to look at with its grandiose sets and top notch creature FX, but it's a lot like Anderson's previous works in that it's all facade and no foundation." Gary Dowell of The Dallas Morning News called the film, "a transparent attempt to jumpstart two run-down franchises". Ed Halter of The Village Voice described the film's lighting for fight sequences as, "black-on-black-in-blackness", while Ty Burr of The Boston Globe felt the lighting "left the audience in the dark".

== Sequel ==
A sequel titled Aliens vs. Predator: Requiem was released in December 2007.

== Video games ==
Game	Details
Alien vs. Predator Original release date(s): NA: August 19, 2004	Release years by system: 2004—Mobile phone
Alien vs. Predator Original release date(s): NA: August 19, 2004	Notes: Developed by Superscape.; Published by Superscape and 3D Wireless Games.; Based on the 2004 film Alien vs. Predator.
Aliens vs. Pinball Original release date(s): April 26, 2016	Release years by system: 2016—Android, iOS, PC, PlayStation 3, PlayStation 4, PlayStation Vita, Wii U, Xbox 360, Xbox One 2017—Nintendo Switch
Aliens vs. Pinball Original release date(s): April 26, 2016	Notes: Developed by Zen Studios.; Expansion Pack for Zen Pinball 2, Pinball FX 2 and Pinball FX 3; Published by Zen Studios.; Contains 3 tables, based on the films Aliens (1986), and Alien vs. Predator (2004), as well as the 2014 video game Alien: Isolation with original plots.

== See also ==
- Alien franchise
- Predator franchise
- List of action films of the 2000s
- List of horror films of 2004
- List of science-fiction films of the 2000s
