= Alien Resurrection =

1997 film by Jean-Pierre Jeunet

- Theatrical release poster
- Directed by: Jean-Pierre Jeunet
- Written by: Joss Whedon
- Based on: Characters by: Dan O'Bannon; Ronald Shusett
- Produced by: Gordon Carroll; David Giler; Sigourney Weaver; Walter Hill; Bill Badalato
- Starring: Sigourney Weaver; Winona Ryder; Ron Perlman; Dan Hedaya; J. E. Freeman; Brad Dourif; Michael Wincott
- Cinematography: Darius Khondji
- Edited by: Hervé Schneid
- Music by: John Frizzell
- Production companies: 20th Century Fox; Brandywine Productions
- Distributed by: 20th Century Fox
- Release dates: November 6, 1997 (Premiere); November 12, 1997 (France); November 26, 1997 (United States)
- Running time: 109 minutes
- Country: United States
- Language: English
- Budget: $70 million
- Box office: $161.4 million

Alien Resurrection is a 1997 American science fiction horror film directed by Jean-Pierre Jeunet, written by Joss Whedon, and starring Sigourney Weaver and Winona Ryder. It is the fourth installment of the Alien franchise, and was filmed at the 20th Century Fox studios in Los Angeles, California.

In the film, set 200 years after Alien 3 (1992), Ellen Ripley is cloned and an Alien queen is surgically removed from her body. The United Systems Military (USM) hopes to breed Aliens to study and research on the spaceship USM Auriga, using human hosts abducted and delivered to them by a group of mercenaries. The Aliens escape their enclosures, and Ripley and the mercenaries attempt to escape and destroy the Auriga before it reaches Earth. Additional roles are played by Ron Perlman, Dan Hedaya, J. E. Freeman, Brad Dourif, and Michael Wincott.

Alien Resurrection had its premiere in Paris on November 6, 1997, and was released to the public on November 12. It grossed US$47.8 million in the United States and Canada, making it the least successful of the Alien series in that market. It grossed $161 million worldwide. The film received mixed reviews from critics, who criticized the screenplay but praised Weaver's performance and Jeunet's direction. The film was nominated for six Saturn Awards, including Best Science Fiction Film, Best Actress for Weaver, Best Supporting Actress for Ryder, and Best Direction for Jeunet.

A sequel to Resurrection was planned, as Whedon had written an earth-set script for Alien 5. Sigourney Weaver was not interested in this setting, but has remained open to reprising her role as Ellen Ripley on the condition that she likes the story. More sequels were planned to follow Resurrection, but were ultimately abandoned as the crossover series arrived with the 2004 film Alien vs. Predator, along with the prequel series including the 2012 film Prometheus. The storylines of Resurrection have been continued in the comic series Aliens versus Predator versus The Terminator, and books Aliens: Original Sin and Alien: Sea of Sorrows.

== Plot ==
200 years after Ellen Ripley's death, (Note: As depicted in Alien 3 (1992)) military scientists aboard the space vessel USM Auriga create a clone of her, designated Ripley 8, using DNA from blood samples taken from Fiorina "Fury" 161. The Xenomorph queen's DNA has been combined with Ripley's, resulting in the clone growing up with an embryo inside it. The scientists extract the embryo, raise it, and collect its eggs while keeping Ripley 8 alive for further study. As a result of the Xenomorph queen's DNA, the clone possesses enhanced strength and reflexes, acidic blood, and a psychic link with the Xenomorphs, making her more empathetic toward them than the humans she encounters. Additionally, the Xenomorph's genetic memory allows the clone to retain some of Ripley's memories.

A group of mercenaries—Elgyn, Johner, Christie, Vriess, Hillard, and Annalee Call—arrives at the Auriga on their ship, the Betty, delivering several abducted humans in stasis. The military scientists use the humans as hosts for the aliens, raising several adult Xenomorphs for study.

The Betty crew soon encounters Ripley 8. Call recognizes her name and attempts to kill her, suspecting that Ripley 8 may be used to create Xenomorphs, but the creatures have already been cloned. The mature Xenomorphs escape confinement by killing one of their own and using its acidic blood to burn through their enclosures. They capture Dr. Jonathan Gediman, damage the Auriga, and kill most of the crew who fail to evacuate, including General Perez and Elgyn. Military scientist Dr. Wren reveals that the ship's default command in an emergency is to return to Earth. Realizing this would unleash the Xenomorphs on Earth, Ripley 8, the mercenaries, Wren, a soldier named DiStephano, and surviving Xenomorph host Purvis decide to head for the Betty and use it to destroy the Auriga. Along the way, Ripley 8 discovers a laboratory containing the grotesque results of the previous seven failed attempts to clone Ellen Ripley. One survivor begs Ripley 8 to euthanize her; she hesitantly complies and then incinerates the lab.

As the group navigates the damaged ship, they swim through a flooded kitchen, pursued by two Xenomorphs. One is killed, while the other snatches Hillard. As they escape the kitchen, the Xenomorph returns and blinds Christie, who sacrifices himself to kill the creature. Wren betrays the group and shoots Call, revealing in her survival that she is a synthetic. Call confesses that she is one of Weyland's legendary extraterrestrial generation of synthetics called "Autons" who were so lifelike that they gained consciousness and rebelled, burning their internal wireless modems and trying to pass themselves off as a human. Knowing what androids can do, Ripley 8 takes Call to a small chapel and makes her connect herself to the station's computer. Using her ability to interface with the Auriga's systems, Call sets the ship on a collision course with Earth, hoping to destroy the Xenomorphs in the crash. She cuts off Wren's escape route and directs the Xenomorphs toward him. Ripley 8 is captured by a Xenomorph while the others head for the Betty. Wren, already aboard, shoots Purvis, takes Call hostage, and demands that she abort the collision. An injured Purvis attacks and grapples Wren, causing his Xenomorph embryo's emergence to kill them both. The survivors shoot and kill the juvenile Xenomorph.

Ripley 8 is taken to the Xenomorph nest, where she finds Gediman alive and partially cocooned. The Xenomorph queen, having developed a uterus due to her genetic contamination with Ripley 8, gives birth to a Xenomorph with overtly human traits. Unable to bond with the queen, the hybrid Xenomorph recognizes Ripley 8 as its mother and kills the Xenomorph queen and Gediman. Ripley 8 takes advantage of the distraction to escape and makes her way to the Betty.

The newborn hybrid reaches the ship and attacks Call, killing DiStephano when he tries to help her. Ripley 8 saves Call by distracting the hybrid. Using her acidic blood, Ripley 8 melts a hole in a window and pushes the hybrid towards it. Ripley 8 tearfully watches as the decompression violently eviscerates the creature through the hole and blows its pulverized remains out into space.

The countdown on the Auriga continues as Ripley 8, Call, Johner, and Vriess escape in the Betty. The Auriga collides with Earth, causing a large explosion. As they look down at Earth, Call asks what Ripley 8 wants to do next. "I don't know. I'm a stranger here myself," she replies.

== Cast ==
- Sigourney Weaver as Ellen Ripley (officially designated as Ripley 8), reprising her role from the previous three Alien films. After having sacrificed herself to kill the Alien queen gestating inside her in Alien 3, Ripley has been cloned using blood samples so that the military may extract the queen embryo. As a result of the cloning process Ripley has been affected by the Alien queen's DNA. She has enhanced strength and reflexes, acidic blood, and the ability to sense the presence of the Aliens. Weaver also portrayed the failed seventh clone.
  - Nicole Fellows as Young Ripley
- Winona Ryder as Annalee Call, the newest crew member of the Betty. She recognizes Ripley and has knowledge of the Aliens. Call is revealed during the course of the film to be a synthetic and helps the surviving crew interface with the Auriga.
- Dominique Pinon as Dom Vriess, the Betty's mechanic. A paraplegic, he uses a motorized wheelchair. Vriess shares a close friendship with Call and an antagonistic relationship with Johner.
- Ron Perlman as Ron Johner, a mercenary and member of the Betty's crew. Johner makes bad jokes, has a short temper, and teases Vriess about his handicap.
- Gary Dourdan as Gary Christie, the first mate and second-in-command of the Betty.
- Michael Wincott as Frank Elgyn, captain of the mercenary ship Betty. Elgyn brings the Betty to the Auriga in order to sell kidnapped humans in cryostasis to General Perez. He is romantically involved with Hillard.
- Kim Flowers as Sabra Hillard, the assistant pilot of the Betty who is romantically involved with Elgyn.
- Dan Hedaya as General Martin Perez. Perez is the commanding officer of the Auriga and supervises the experiments to clone Ripley and study the Aliens.
- J. E. Freeman as Dr. Mason Wren. Wren is one of several scientists aboard the Auriga involved in cloning Ripley and studying the Aliens. After the Aliens escape he joins the lead characters in their attempt to flee the ship.
- Brad Dourif as Dr. Jonathan Gediman, another of the scientists involved in cloning Ripley and studying the Aliens. One alien attacks him after he tries to chase them.
- Raymond Cruz as Vincent DiStephano. DiStephano is a soldier stationed aboard the Auriga. When the Aliens break out, he joins the crew in their attempt to escape from the ship.
- Leland Orser as Larry Purvis. Purvis is one of several humans who have been kidnapped by the crew of the Betty while in cryosleep and delivered to the Auriga to serve as hosts for the Aliens. Despite having an Alien growing inside him, Purvis joins the surviving crew in an attempt to escape from the Auriga.
- Carolyn Campbell as Anesthesiologist
- Marlene Bush as Dr. Carlyn Williamson (credited as "Scientist"), the third member of the science team responsible for cloning Ripley. She is often confused with Carolyn Campbell's character, as the two look strikingly similar.
- David St. James as Dr. Dan Sprague (credited as "Surgeon"), another member of the Auriga's science team.
- Tom Woodruff Jr. as the lead Alien, Alien queen, and the Newborn. Woodruff had previously played the Alien in Alien 3, and described the Alien in Resurrection as feeling "much more like a dog. It's got dog legs, a more pointed nose, and a more vicious mouth." Weaver praised Woodruff's work, saying that "working with him is like working with Lon Chaney, only Tom's usually covered with K-Y Jelly." Woodruff also played the lead Alien in the crossover films, Alien vs. Predator and Aliens vs. Predator: Requiem.
  - Joan La Barbara and Archie Hahn as The Newborn (voice)
- Steven Gilborn as Father (voice). The artificial intelligence system of the USM Auriga.

== Production ==
=== Origins ===
Impressed with his work as a screenwriter, 20th Century Fox hired Joss Whedon to write the film's script. Whedon's initial screenplay had a third act on Earth, with a final battle for Earth itself. Whedon wrote five versions of the final act, none of which ended up in the film.

The studio initially imagined that the film would center around a clone of the character Newt from Aliens, as the Ellen Ripley character had died at the end of Alien 3. Whedon composed a thirty-page treatment surrounding this idea before being informed that the studio, though impressed with his script, now intended to base the story on a clone of Ripley, whom they saw as the anchor of the series. Whedon had to rewrite the script in a way that would bring back the Ripley character, a task he found difficult. The idea of cloning was suggested by producers David Giler and Walter Hill, who opposed the production of Alien Resurrection, as they thought it would ruin the franchise.

Sigourney Weaver, who had played Ripley throughout the series, wanted to liberate the character in Alien 3 as she did not want Ripley to become "a figure of fun" who would continuously "wake up with monsters running around". The possibility of an Alien vs. Predator film was another reason for the character's death, as she thought the concept "sounded awful". However, Weaver was impressed with Whedon's script. She thought that the error during Ripley's cloning process would allow her to further explore the character, since Ripley becoming part-human and part-Alien would create uncertainty about where her loyalties lay. This was an interesting concept to Weaver, who thought the film brought back the spirit of Alien and Aliens. Weaver received a co-producer credit and was reportedly paid $11 million.

=== Direction and design ===
Trainspotting director Danny Boyle was the producers' first choice to direct the film. Boyle and his producer met with effects supervisors to discuss the film, but he passed on the project and went on to make A Life Less Ordinary instead. Boyle said that while he was "very passionate" about the project, he did not consider himself ready for the amount of effects needed for the film, "I just suddenly had a rare moment of clarity, thinking, "You are not the right guy for this."" Peter Jackson was also approached, but declined as he could not get excited about an Alien film. In 1995, after the release of The Usual Suspects, 20th Century Fox approached Bryan Singer to direct. Jean-Pierre Jeunet was asked to direct, as the film's producers believed he had a unique visual style. Jeunet had just completed the script to Amélie and was surprised he was offered the job for Alien Resurrection, as he thought the franchise had finished with Alien 3 and believed that making a sequel was a bad idea. Jeunet accepted the project with a budget of $70 million. He required an interpreter as he did not speak much English when filming began.

Jeunet hired French special effects supervisor Pitof and cinematographer Darius Khondji, both of whom he had worked with on The City of Lost Children. Nigel Phelps was chosen for production designer, having made a name for himself designing Gotham City in Batman and Mega-City One in Judge Dredd. Jeunet and his crew watched the latest science fiction and Alien films as reference material, and obtained production reports from the Alien films to study the camera setups. Jeunet was given creative control, contributing several elements to the script including five endings, although the expensive ones were dismissed. He also opted to make the film a dark comedy and was encouraged to include more violence. In June 1996, Jeunet's frequent co-director, conceptual artist Marc Caro had drawn rough sketches of characters' costumes, which were shown to veteran costume designer Bob Ringwood. Ringwood made several modifications for the final design.

=== Creatures ===
The original design of the human/Alien hybrid included a mix of female and male sex organs, which were removed during post-production.

Special effects company Amalgamated Dynamics Incorporated (ADI) was hired for the film, having previously worked on Alien 3. ADI founders Tom Woodruff Jr. and Alec Gillis also had experience working with Stan Winston on Aliens. ADI based their designs and modifications of the Alien creatures on the film's script, which included the creatures having pointed tails for swimming, making their head domes and chins more pointed, and establishing them to appear more vicious using techniques of camera angles and shot duration. After receiving the director's approval, ADI began to create small sculptures, sketches, paintings, and life-size models. Referring to the use of animatronics in the film, Twentieth Century Fox executive Tom Rothman stated, "Most movies would be tempted to do the Newborn digitally ... [but] it looks so much more real when you [use] animatronics".

Jeunet asked ADI to lean towards making the human/Alien hybrid creature more human than Alien. An early concept was to replicate Sigourney Weaver's features, although the crew felt this design would be too similar to the design of the creature Sil from the 1995 film Species. Eyes and a nose were added to the hybrid to allow it to have more expressions and communicate more emotion than the xenomorphs, so that it would have more depth as a character rather than being "just a killing machine". Jeunet was adamant about the hybrid having genitalia which resembled a mix of male and female sexes. 20th Century Fox was uncomfortable with this, however, and Jeunet eventually changed his mind, feeling that "even for a Frenchman, it's too much". The genitalia were removed during post-production using digital effects techniques. The animatronic hybrid required nine puppeteers and was the most complex animatronic in the film.

=== Filming ===
Alien Resurrection was filmed at Fox studios in Los Angeles, California, from October 1996 to February 1997. Jeunet had difficulty securing studio space, as the filming of Hollywood blockbusters such as Titanic, Starship Troopers, and The Lost World: Jurassic Park were taking place at the same time. Alien Resurrection was the first installment in the Alien series to be filmed outside England, a decision made by Weaver, who believed that the previous films' travel schedules exhausted the crew.

The underwater scene was the first to be shot, and for its filming Stage 16 at Fox Studios was reconstructed into a 36-by-45-meter tank, 4.5 meters deep, containing 548,000 gallons of water. The decision was made to convert the stage rather than film the scene elsewhere, since moving the film crew to the nearest adequate facility in San Diego would have been too costly for a single scene, and by converting Stage 16 20th Century Fox would be able to use the tank for future films. Because of the aquatic filming, the ability to swim was a prerequisite for cast and crew when signing onto the film. The cast trained in swimming pools in Los Angeles with professional divers to learn how to use the equipment. An additional two and a half weeks of training took place at the studio with stunt coordinator Ernie Orsatti and underwater cinematographer Peter Romano. Weaver, however, was unable to participate in most of the training due to commitments on Broadway. Winona Ryder faced a challenge with the scene, as she had nearly drowned at age 12 and had not been in the water since. She suggested using a body double, but knew that it would be too obvious to audiences due to the difference in hair length. She filmed the scene, but suffered from anxiety on the first day of filming.

Weaver had the idea that as an example of Ripley's new powers, there could be a scene in which she threw a basketball through a hoop backwards. Jeunet was concerned that the shot would require hundreds of takes, and wanted to either use a machine to throw the ball or to insert it later using computer-generated imagery (CGI), but Weaver was determined to make the shot authentic and insisted on doing it herself. After training for a month, during which she averaged one out of six baskets, she arrived on set on the day of filming to find that the set was built to require a much longer shot than she had practiced for. Despite this, on the first take she made the throw perfectly. It amazed the cast and crew, and caused Ron Perlman to break character and turn to the camera to say "Oh my god!", leading to fears that he had ruined the once in a lifetime take. However, there was enough of a pause between Weaver's basket and Perlman's statement for the film's editors to cut the scene accordingly during post-production. The ball was out of frame for a moment during the shot, and Pitof offered to edit it so that the ball was on-screen for the entire scene, but Weaver refused.

=== Visual effects and miniatures ===
The film's script was laid out similar to a comic book, with pictures on the left and dialog and descriptions on the right. Jeunet planned every shot, which made it easier for visual effects artists to do their work. Blue Sky Studios was hired to create the first CGI Aliens to appear on film. Impressed with the company's work on Joe's Apartment creating CGI cockroaches, Jeunet and Pitof opted to hire the company to create 30 to 40 shots of CGI Aliens. The decision was made to use CGI Aliens rather than puppets or suited actors whenever the creatures' legs were in frame, as Jeunet felt that a man in a suit is easy to distinguish when the full body is seen.

All of the spaceships in the film were miniatures, as visual effects supervisors believed CGI was not effective enough to create realistic spaceships. The USM Auriga was originally designed by artist Nigel Phelps and resembled a medical instrument. This design proved to be too vertical for the film's opening shot, in which the camera pans out to show the ship, and did not appear satisfactory in the film's 2.35:1 aspect ratio. Three days before the design had to be finalized, Jeunet rejected it. Phelps, production illustrator Jim Martin, and concept artist Sylvain Despretz were tasked to redesign the ship. Jeunet felt Martin's design was too much like a space station, while he accepted Despretz's design due to its streamlined and horizontal appearance.

Argonaut Games, developer of the film's tie-in video game, was also tasked to create a game that would appear in the film titled Atom Zone. The game was created within a time frame of a few days and involved the building of custom hardware to run the game which briefly appears during the film's introduction of the Betty's crew.

== Music ==
Composer John Frizzell was encouraged by a friend to audition to compose Alien Resurrection's film score. Frizzell sent in four cassettes and received a call from 20th Century Fox about the fourth, which contained music from The Empty Mirror. Impressed with his work, Fox representative Robert Kraft had a short meeting with Frizzell and hired him. At that time, Frizzell was a newcomer in film composing history, having previously worked on Beavis and Butt-Head Do America and Dante's Peak. He spent seven months writing and recording the score, which Jeunet requested to be very different and unique from the previous films in the series. This included themes of romance and eroticism, incorporating sound effects such as a gong and rub rod. The cue "They Swim" took one month to complete as Jeunet was not pleased with Frizzell's original version, although the final result was a mix between the first and third versions he had composed. "I'm Popeye the Sailor Man", Popeye's theme song, written by Sammy Lerner, is whistled by Dom Vriess and is acknowledged in the credits.

== Release ==
=== Theatrical ===
The film had its premiere in Paris on November 6, 1997, before opening in France on November 12. It opened in the United States and Canada on November 26.

=== Home media ===
Alien Resurrection was first released onto home video in the VHS, LaserDisc and DVD formats on June 2, 1998. The film received its first Blu-ray release as part of the Alien Anthology box set released in 2010, including all four films and their alternate versions. The film was re-released on Blu-ray on May 10, 2011, in a stand-alone feature.

=== Special editions ===
In 2003, Jeunet included an alternate version of the film on the Alien Quadrilogy DVD box set with different opening and closing scenes, which were originally cut due to budget restrictions. The deleted scenes included references to the character Newt from Aliens; Vriess making a joke to Call; Ripley's clone waking up in the middle of her operation; an extended conversation between General Perez and Elgyn; an extended conversation in the mess hall that reveals the eventual fate of Ripley's former employers, Weyland–Yutani; an extended dialogue between Call and Ripley's clone in the chapel; and scenes of the Betty landing on Earth and the planet's landscape during the final dialogue between Ripley and Call, as they view the ruins of Paris. The special edition restores 13 minutes and 5 seconds' worth of footage (including the new opening and ending), and is 7 minutes longer than the theatrical version. Jeunet has stated that the special edition is not a director's cut as his preferred version is the theatrical cut. Alien Quadrilogy contains a documentary called One Step Beyond: The Making of Alien Resurrection, featuring over two hours of footage relating to pre-production, production, post-production, screen tests, concept art, and audio commentary by the cast and crew. Alien Resurrection – Collector's Edition, which also includes One Step Beyond: The Making of Alien Resurrection, was released on January 6, 2004.

== Reception ==
=== Box office ===
Alien Resurrection opened in France on November 12, 1997, on 507 screens and had over 1 million admissions for the week with a gross of $6,754,530, finishing at the top of the French box office. The film was released in the United States and Canada on November 26. Debuting at number two at the box office behind Flubber, Alien Resurrection grossed $25 million in its first five days—$16 million over the weekend, for an average of $6,821 per 2,415 theaters. The film went on to gross $47.8 million in the United States and Canada, making it the lowest-grossing installment of the Alien series in that market. It was well received internationally, however, with a gross of $113.6 million, bringing its total gross to $161.4 million. It was the 43rd-highest-grossing film in the United States and Canada in 1997.

In the UK, Alien Resurrection beat out The Full Monty to reach the number one spot, collecting $4.4 million during its opening weekend. It surpassed Bram Stoker's Dracula for having the highest opening weekend for an 18 certificate film, a record held until the release of American Beauty in 2000. The film also had the second-highest opening for a 20th Century Fox film in Spain, behind Independence Day.

=== Critical response ===
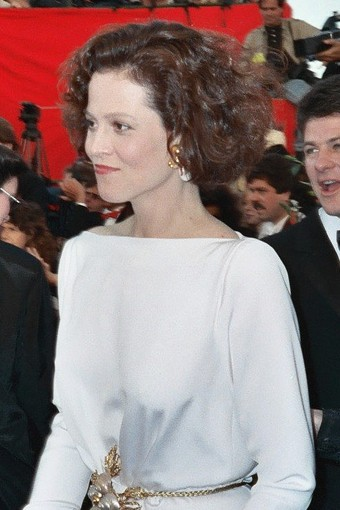
Weaver's performance as Ripley 8 was widely praised by critics.

As of January 2026, 56% of the 163 reviews compiled by Rotten Tomatoes are positive, and have an average rating of 5.9/10. The website's critical consensus reads, "While Sigourney Weaver's feral performance as a resurrected Ripley restores some fun to the Alien franchise, the acid blood running through this fourth entry's veins corrodes whatever emotional investment audiences had left." Metacritic assigned the film a score of 63 out of 100, based on 21 reviews, indicating "generally favorable" reviews. Audiences polled by CinemaScore gave the film an average grade of "B−" on an A+ to F scale.

Lisa Schwarzbaum from Entertainment Weekly gave the film "B+" and stated "By rocketing ahead 200 years from the previous film and jiggering the story cleverly [...] to create a Ripley reconstructed through a mix of human and alien DNA, Alien Resurrection power-kicks the whole definition of the Horrifying Other into a fresh, deep, exhilaratingly thoughtful, millennium-sensitive direction". Radio Times's Alan Jones described the film as "tense, mordantly funny, very graphic, and bloody", and praised Weaver in a four out of five stars review. Houston Chronicle editor Louis B. Parks said "The film is a marvel, a well-photographed feast of visual imagery", while Richard Schickel of Time wrote that it was "Less frightening, but as much fun as ever". The Washington Post contributor Desson Thomson felt it "satisfactorily recycles the great surprises that made the first movie so powerful. And most significantly, it makes a big hoot of the whole business". Andrew Johnston commented in Time Out New York that "If Ripley, Call, and the pirates had been developed further, the film might have been as involving as James Cameron's Aliens, the gold-standard of the series. The film's Techno-Gothic look is gorgeously immersive, however, and Jeunet turns in a number of original (and grotesque) effects sequences that are worth the price of admission". Salon′s Laura Miller noted "Weaver obviously relishes playing this feral, sarcastic new Ripley, and her pleasure is infectious". Rolling Stone critic Peter Travers's review was mostly positive, writing that the film "is sometimes glib and repetitive, but it stays worthy of its predecessors by staying close to its two battered heroines".

TV Guide magazine's Maitland McDonagh wrote in her mixed review, "The plot is more of the same old running and screaming, but Weaver is worth the price of admission all by herself, which is just as well in light of the less-than-fleshed-out characters by whom she's surrounded." Gary Thompson of Philadelphia Daily News gave it a "C", describing it as "a walking-zombie sequel that looks and smells like a corpse brought back from the dead." James Berardinelli also gave a mixed review at ReelViews by writing "If you consider Alien and Aliens to be the main course, then Alien Resurrection is leftovers". Jeffery Overstreet of Looking closer rated the film "C+" and commented "What began as the most menacing movie monster of all has evolved into a whining oaf that looks like it's been dipped in a vat of Cream of Wheat". Janet Maslin from The New York Times reported "The filmmaker's ghoulishly fecund imagination makes this tale ... so murky that even the screen's toughest woman-warrior remains largely stuck in the mud." Roger Ebert of the Chicago Sun-Times gave the film a negative review, stating "There is not a single shot in the movie to fill one with wonder", later naming it one of the worst films of 1997.

Screenwriter Joss Whedon was unhappy with the final product, remarking that it closely followed his script but was poorly executed. Conversely, H. R. Giger, designer of the original Alien, was pleased with Resurrection, describing it as an "excellent film", but was disappointed about not being credited. For the 25th anniversary of Alien Resurrection, Director Jean-Pierre Jeunet watched a 35 mm print of the film: "I was a little bit concerned to watch my film – maybe I won't like it?" he says. "No, it was great! I have a lot of shots that I love. For the people who don't like it, I can say, 'f*** you!'"

== Other media ==
=== Book ===
To coincide with the release of the film, a book titled Making of Alien Resurrection was released on November 28, 1997.

=== Novelization ===
A novelization of the film by A.C. Crispin released on December 1, 1997.

=== Comic books ===
Dark Horse Comics also published a two-issue comic book adaptation.

=== Video game ===
A video game Alien Resurrection for the PlayStation was released in 2000, developed by Argonaut Games.

== Future ==
Joss Whedon had written an Earth-set script for Alien 5, but Sigourney Weaver was not interested in this setting and sought to return the story to the planetoid from the first film. Weaver has remained open to a role in a fifth installment on the condition that she likes the story. Before 20th Century Fox greenlit Alien vs. Predator, James Cameron had been collaborating on the plot for a fifth Alien film with another writer. Learning of Fox's plans for a crossover, he ceased work on his concept. Before he saw the Vs. film, Cameron had stated that it would "kill the validity of the franchise", and that "it was Frankenstein Meets Werewolf"—like "Universal just taking their assets and starting to play them off against each other". Although he later admitted to liking Alien vs. Predator, Cameron ruled out any future involvement with the series.

In a 2002 interview, Ridley Scott stated that a new Alien project "would be a lot of fun", but that "the most important thing was to get the story right". Scott's concept for the plot was "to go back to where the alien creatures were first found and explain how they were created". In late 2008, Weaver hinted in an interview with MTV that she and Scott were working on an Alien spinoff film, which would focus on the chronicles of Ellen Ripley rather than on the Aliens, but the continuation of Ripley's story has not materialized. Instead, Prometheus was released on June 8, 2012. A sequel to Prometheus, titled Alien: Covenant, was released on May 19, 2017.

At the 2014 Hero Complex Film Festival, Sigourney Weaver hinted that she would be interested in returning to the role of Ripley, saying: "Had we done a fifth one, I don't doubt that her humanity would have prevailed. I do feel like there is more story to tell. I feel a longing from fans for the story to be finished. I could imagine a situation where we finish telling the story." She was quoted: "I don't think Alien belongs on Earth popping out of a haystack, which is where I was afraid it was going to go. I feel it should take place in the far reaches of the universe where no one in their right mind would go. There are very few filmmakers that I can think of that I would want to entrust this to."

In 2017, 20th Century Fox was rumored to be reassessing the state of the franchise after the lukewarm reception to Covenant, although they have not released an official statement to that effect. According to Collider.com, there will be only one additional prequel film before a soft-reboot is made to the Alien universe consisting of a new series of Alien films with brand-new, original characters as well as a new setting. At the 2019 CinemaCon, following The Walt Disney Company's acquisition of 21st Century Fox, it was officially confirmed that future Alien films were currently in development. Fede Álvarez would be writing and directing the film, which was now titled Alien: Romulus. The film, which is set between Alien (1979) and Aliens (1986), was released on August 16, 2024.

== See also ==
- List of films featuring extraterrestrials
- List of monster movies
- List of underwater science fiction works
