= Gordon Carroll =

American film producer (1928–2005)

- Born: Charles Gordon Carroll III; February 2, 1928; Baltimore, Maryland, U.S.
- Died: September 20, 2005 (aged 77); Los Angeles, California, U.S.
- Education: Princeton University
- Occupation: Film producer
- Years active: 1968–2005
- Notable work: Alien franchise (1979–1997)
- Family: Robert Carroll (brother)

Charles Gordon Carroll III (February 2, 1928 – September 20, 2005) was an American film producer. He is known for his work on the Alien franchise (1979–2004), for which he co-founded Brandywine Productions with David Giler and Walter Hill, to produce the Alien film series. He was also associated with Jack Lemmon, producing four films through the actor's Jalem Productions company (1964–1970). He died on September 20, 2005, in Los Angeles, California.

== Early life and career ==
Carroll was raised in New York City where he was influenced by his father's love of literature. He received his education from Princeton University in advertising and after military duty as a first lieutenant in the Korean War, he returned to Manhattan and entered the advertising world at Foote, Cone & Belding.

He began his film career as executive producer of How to Murder Your Wife, which was filmed in March 1964 and produced through Jack Lemmon's independent film production company, Jalem Productions. In August 1964, Lemmon appointed Carroll vice president of Jalem Productions. From there, he went on to produce other films through Jalem, including Luv and Cool Hand Luke (both 1967), and The April Fools (1969).

After parting ways with Lemmon, he partnered with Paul Newman (who had starred in Cool Hand Luke) to make Pat Garrett and Billy the Kid (1973). He later worked on such films as Blue Thunder (1983) starring Roy Scheider, The Best of Times (1986) starring Kurt Russell and Robin Williams, and Red Heat (1988) starring Arnold Schwarzenegger and Jim Belushi. He also produced the first five films of the Alien franchise: Alien (1979), Aliens (1986), Alien 3 (1992), Alien Resurrection(1997), and Alien vs. Predator (2004).

== Death ==
Carrol died of a heart attack on September 20, 2005, in Los Angeles, California, U.S., at the age of 77. His body was cremated and his ashes were given to his family.

== Filmography ==
He was producer for all films unless otherwise noted.

=== Film ===
| Year | Film | Credit | Notes |
|---|---|---|---|
| 1965 | How to Murder Your Wife | Executive producer | for Jalem Productions |
| 1967 | Luv | Executive producer | for Jalem Productions |
| 1967 | Cool Hand Luke | Executive producer | for Jalem Productions |
| 1969 | The April Fools | Executive producer | for Jalem Productions |
| 1973 | Pat Garrett and Billy the Kid | | |
| 1979 | Alien | | |
| 1983 | Blue Thunder | | |
| 1986 | The Best of Times | | |
| 1986 | Aliens | Executive producer | |
| 1988 | Red Heat | | |
| 1992 | Alien 3 | | |
| 1997 | Alien Resurrection | | |
| 2004 | Alien vs. Predator | | Final film as a producer |

Miscellaneous crew

| Year | Film | Role | Notes |
|---|---|---|---|
| 2004 | Dear Frankie | Advisor: Philately | Uncredited |
