= Walter Hill =

American filmmaker (born 1942)

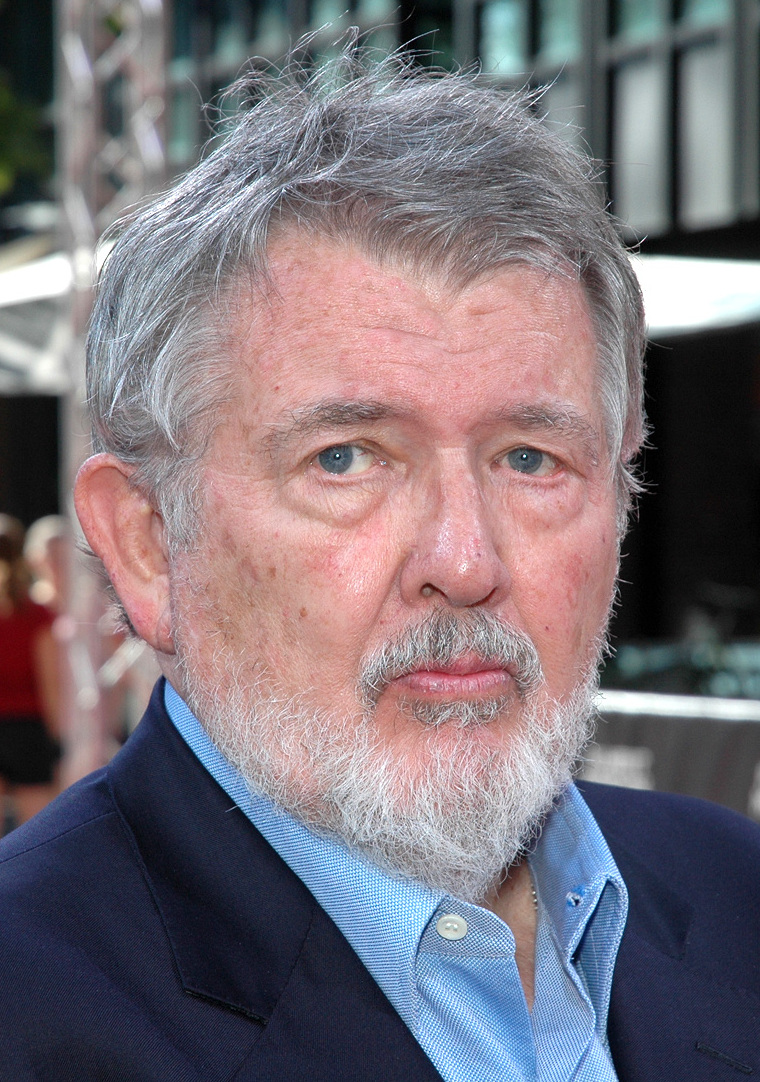
- Hill in 2014
- Born: January 10, 1942 (age 84); Long Beach, California, U.S.
- Education: Michigan State University (BA)
- Occupations: Film director; screenwriter; film producer
- Years active: 1968–present
- Spouse: Hildy Gottlieb (m. 1986)
- Children: 2

Walter Hill (born January 10, 1942) is an American filmmaker, known for his action films and revival of the Western genre. He has directed such films as The Driver, The Warriors, Southern Comfort, 48 Hrs. and its sequel Another 48 Hrs., Streets of Fire and Red Heat, and wrote the screenplay for the crime drama The Getaway. He has also directed several episodes of television series such as Tales from the Crypt and Deadwood and produced films in the Alien franchise. He founded Brandywine Productions with David Giler and Gordon Carroll.

Hill said in an interview that "every film I've done has been a Western", and elaborated in another that "the Western is ultimately a stripped down moral universe that is, whatever the dramatic problems are, beyond the normal avenues of social control and social alleviation of the problem, and I like to do that even within contemporary stories".

== Early life ==
Hill was born in Long Beach, California, the younger of two sons. His paternal grandfather was a wildcat oil driller; his father worked at Douglas Aircraft as a supervisor on the assembly line. Hill has said that his father and grandfather were "smart, physical men who worked with their heads and their hands" and had "great mechanical ability". Hill's family had originally come from Tennessee and Mississippi, "one of those fallen Southern families, shirtsleeves to shirtsleeves in three generations". "I got along with both my parents very well," Hill said. "I admired them enormously."

Growing up in Southern California, Hill was asthmatic as a child and, as a result, missed several years of school.

Despite the discomfort, it made you comfortable being alone with yourself. You weren't as surrounded by your peers as everybody else your age was... In my case it meant tremendous amount of reading at an early age... I read, listened to radio... I became utterly besotted with daytime serials... it enabled me to live in an imaginary world where one is comfortable with abstract ideas, dominated by stories, narrative, and characters.

— Walter Hill

Hill became a film fan at an early age, and the first film he remembers seeing was Song of the South (1946). He later described his taste as "juvenile", stating: "I liked adventure, westerns, but I liked everything. Musicals. But the general, I remember not liking kid movies... still don't, I think that's hung on." His asthma receded when he was 15 and he began to think about becoming a writer. He worked in the oil fields as a roustabout on Signal Hill, California, during high school and several more years while in college. One summer, he ran an asbestos pipe-cutting machine and worked as a spray painter.

As a teenager, Hill contemplated being a comic book illustrator and studied art at the Universidad de las Américas, Mexico City. "Mexico was as far away as I could get without any money," he says.

He then transferred and majored in history at Michigan State University. He said that, during this period, he was a particular fan of Ernest Hemingway's writing and came to believe that "the hardest thing to do is write clearly and simply, and make your point in an elegant way". Upon graduation, Hill was called up for the United States Army in 1964, but childhood asthma saw him ruled ineligible. This forced him to think about what he wanted to do for a career. "When you are that age, you think you are going to be in the army two years, it's a huge amount of time. You don't bother worrying about what you are doing. Suddenly, this whole thing was upon me."

Through a friend Hill got a job in Los Angeles researching historical documentaries made by a company that was associated with Encyclopædia Britannica. He began seeing more and more scripts, writing scripts and developed the urge to direct.

Seeing so many of the European films, Japanese films, I was part of this isolated community in east Hollywood. I remembered thinking just a little further west they are making the films I want to see. I'm going to do this. Sink or swim... I wanted to be a writer on my way to being a director. Directors were already my heroes. Kurosawa, number of Italian directors... Movies from England, France, Sweden, Italy. Poland... One wanted a chance to tell stories in an open, loose, not constricted Hollywood kind of way. At the same time you wanted to work in Hollywood... I was tremendously interested in genre films. Wanted to work within genre films.

— Walter Hill

== Career ==
=== Assistant director ===
After this contract to make historical documentaries finished, Hill worked for a time in the mail room at Universal ("Somebody told me that was a good way to meet people"). He then got into the training program of the Directors Guild of America, which enabled him to work in television as an apprentice. He observed and worked for over a year on such shows as Gunsmoke, The Wild Wild West, Bonanza and Warning Shot. "I did a lot of shows for a couple of weeks, they would rotate you through," he says.

Hill wound up as second assistant director on The Thomas Crown Affair in 1968. He then went on to work as the uncredited second assistant director on Bullitt — "It was my job to set background and also to set it up with the police. We had to organise every shot so people wouldn't wander out into the middle of the street and be hit... Every time we did a shot I was scared to death."

In 1969, he was the second assistant director on Woody Allen's mockumentary film, Take the Money and Run, but said he remembers doing very little except passing out the call sheets and filling out time cards. He also worked as a first assistant director on a television advertisement. "I didn't have a shred of desire in those areas," says Hill of assistant directing. "I wanted to work and be around films. I certainly took my duties fairly seriously and all that. I didn't see it as a long term kind of commitment."

=== Screenwriter ===
During this time Hill was writing screenplays on nights and on the weekends.

"I began to read screenplays that were being made, and I hesitate to say this, but I guess I read them and said: 'Christ, I could do that.'" It took him "four to five years to write my first screenplay writing at night, while I still had another day job."

He says one of his earlier works "was intensely personal about a love affair I had. It was terrible, I knew it." It was not until he started writing in a more "structured narrative environment" that he "began to find my voice... I had a hard time finishing scripts. My problem was finding certain character narrative concerns. Once I finished scripts, I almost instantly made a living. Not only made a living, but got them made. From the time I finished them to the time they were getting made, making progress on the trail, that all happened pretty quickly.

Hill later said, "I was very sympathetic and identified with the New Hollywood." But his films "are, or were, rather retro. That is to say, I didn't tackle subjects. I wanted to do genre films."

Hill's first completed screenplay, a Western called Lloyd Williams and His Brother, was optioned by Joe Wizan. It was never made but the script was admired at Warner Bros who asked Hill to pitch some projects. He came up with a detective story, Hickey & Boggs and the studio agreed to finance a draft. "Detective films were very old hat, not the kind of thing a young screenwriter was going to pitch," recalls Hill. "I think they were intrigued, maybe fresh air could be blown into a venerable genre."

Warners liked the Hickey & Boggs script and hired Hill to rewrite the script for The Thief Who Came to Dinner, for which he ended up getting sole credit. Hickey & Boggs was later sold to United Artists and rewritten by director Robert Culp. Hill said he felt the film "had some nice moments, but it was cast much differently than it was written. I wasn't too excited about it."

Meanwhile, Peter Bogdanovich's ex-wife Polly Platt, a production designer, had read Hill's script for Hickey & Boggs and recommended him to co-write The Getaway, which Bogdanovich was going to make with Steve McQueen. Bogdanovich and Hill worked on the script together in San Francisco while Bogdanovich was directing What's Up, Doc? Hill says that Bogdanovich was interested in making the film a more Hitchcock-type film. They had completed 25 pages when they went back to L.A., whereupon McQueen fired Bogdanovich without reading any of their work. Sam Peckinpah came on to direct; Hill started from scratch and wrote his own script in six weeks. The resulting film was a big hit which Hill later described "of the films I wrote, I thought it was far and away the best one, and most interesting." He said the success of the film "was really how I got to be a director; the fact it had done so well put me in line to get a shot."

Hill and Peckinpah got along well and for a time it seemed Peckinpah might direct Lloyd Williams but he decided to make Pat Garrett and Billy the Kid instead. The Thief Who Came to Dinner eventually came out. Walter Hill later said "Warren Oates was very good in the movie—better than the movie was. They cut a lot of things out of the movie they shouldn't have."

Hill went on to write a pair of Paul Newman films, The Mackintosh Man and The Drowning Pool. By Hill's own admission, his work on The Mackintosh Man "wasn't much" and he did it to settle a lawsuit with Warner Bros, with whom he was angry for selling Hickey & Boggs—Warners offered to settle the suit if Hill wrote them a screenplay, giving him the chance to adapt his choice of several novels that the studio owned the film rights to. He picked The Freedom Trap, by Desmond Bagley.

"I wrote a quick script which I was not particularly enamored with myself," Hill said. However it attracted the interest of Paul Newman and John Huston. "One would like to think you are mistaken about the wonders of your work, but I didn't believe it," he said. "That part turned out to be true. I went over to work on the script with Huston. He wasn't very well, I ended up with sole screen credit, but one of the problems is the screen credit is misleading very often. I wrote 90% of the first half, various people wrote the rest. I didn't think it was a very good film. Hill says he never saw the final product, but was told it was "a real bomb".

Producers Larry Turman and David Foster asked Hill to adapt Ross Macdonald's novel The Drowning Pool for Robert Mulligan to direct as a sequel to a previous Newman film, Harper (1965). The producers did not like the direction Hill took with his script—he later estimated only two scenes in the final film were his—so he left the project to write Hard Times for Larry Gordon at Columbia Pictures.

In the early years of his career, Hill set up his own production company, Brandywine Productions, to develop and produce films. A script came to him, Alien, which he optioned and rewrote with his partner, David Giler. Hill and Giler were not credited for their writing work. Hill decided not to direct the film, which became a massive hit.

John Hughes later recalled, "I had been writing scripts for quite a while, but I never really knew what screenwriting was about until I read the script Walter wrote for Alien."

=== Film director ===
==== 1970s ====
By the early 1970s, Hill wanted to direct.

I think in casual conversation I would have told anybody I wanted to direct. At the same time I knew Hollywood was a closed off place... It was much harder to get in. To be an older director was a very positive thing. It meant you had survived, knew your way, could make things and make them meet your economic responsibilities. It was always paramount in studio minds, especially in those days... If I was going to direct I was going to write my way in. No TV, no play, I was simply somebody who said I have a sensibility, I think I can do this, based on nothing other than my scripts basically.

Hill met producer Lawrence Gordon in 1973. He agreed to let Hill direct a film if he wrote a screenplay for him. Hill made a deal to write and direct for scale and in turn got a shot at directing. The result was Hill's 1975 breakthrough film, Hard Times, made on location in New Orleans for just $2.7 million in 38 days. James Coburn played a fast-talking promoter of illegal street fights in 1930s New Orleans and Charles Bronson played the boxer protagonist.

The film was also a turning point for Hill as a screenwriter. He read Alexander Jacobs' screenplay for the John Boorman film Point Blank and considered it a "revelation" in terms of style and format. He decided to tailor his own scripts in that manner, as he described it, "extremely spare, almost Haiku style. Both stage directions and dialogue." He was also influenced by Sam Peckinpah. Hill wrote Hard Times, The Driver, The Warriors, and the uncredited rewrite of Alien in this style.

Following the movie Hill was approached to direct The Shootist with John Wayne but turned it down as he disliked the script.

He created the TV series Dog and Cat which premiered in 1977 starring a young Kim Basinger as a police officer. Hill's pilot script was rewritten and he took credit under a pseudonym. The TV series was not a ratings success and was soon cancelled. However Hill's pilot script later influenced Shane Black's original script for Lethal Weapon.

Hill's second film as a director was The Driver starring Ryan O'Neal as a laconic getaway driver for hire and Bruce Dern as a driven cop pursuing him. No character in the film has a name; they are merely The Driver, The Detective, and so forth. Hill originally had wanted to cast Steve McQueen, but he turned down the role because he did not want to do another car film. "This Walter Hill is a force to be reckoned with," said O'Neal, "a first rate writer and an even better director. And he's fast. Most young directors today think they are David Lean."

The Driver was financed by EMI Films who announced they would make a second film with Hill, a Western he wrote with Roger Spottiswoode, The Last Gun. However The Driver was a commercial failure in the United States. "To say it did not do well would be kind," said Hill. "Had I not been shooting The Warriors at the time, I don't think my career would have survived. They loved it overseas, but in those days, that didn't matter that much. It made exactly zero dollars in the United States. I remember the studio had this huge sheaf of Xeroxed reviews they'd handed me — you could stop a fucking .45 slug with this stack, it was so thick. And of all the reviews in this six-inch thick pile, there was only one good one." (In 2016 Hill would say that "whenever they show retrospectives of my stuff, it's usually the first thing they show. Sometimes you just have to wait it out.")

Hill was going to make The Last Gun with Larry Gordon but when the financing on the project failed to materialize, Gordon showed Hill a copy of the novel The Warriors by Sol Yurick. They took it to Paramount Pictures because they were interested in youth films at the time and succeeded in getting the project financed. Hill remembers "it came together very quickly. Larry had a special relationship with Paramount and we promised to make the movie very cheaply, which we did. So it came together within a matter of weeks."

When The Warriors was released there were a series of shootings and killings at screenings involving filmgoers on their way to or from showings. This prompted Paramount to remove advertisements from radio and television completely and display ads in the press were reduced to the film's title. However the film was very popular and received excellent reviews.

"Hollywood forgives a lot when you have a hit," said Hill. "I don't know what to say about it, other than the fact that it was just a gift in terms of getting it. The studio hated it, and didn't even want to release it. There was a lot of friction with management at the time. Some of it might have been my fault."

==== 1980s ====
James Keach had developed a script about the Jesse James Gang, The Long Riders, which United Artists were willing to finance if a suitable director were to be found. Hill was approached and eagerly agreed to film his first Western. The film is remembered for casting real-life acting brothers (the Keaches, Carradines, Quaids and Guests) as historical outlaw siblings (the James, Younger, Miller and Ford brothers). Hill later said his "code" for the film was to keep "the jokes funny and the bullets real. It is about moral choices. I think people who object to violence shouldn't go to the movies.... The use of all the brothers can be perceived as a gimmick but I wanted a family feeling to the movie."

Hill's next film was going to be adaptations of The Last Good Kiss (by James Crumley) and then Red Harvest (by Dashiell Hammett). However neither were made, though the story of Last Man Standing (which he made in 1996) was very close to Red Harvest. Instead Hill did Southern Comfort, originally written in 1976. It was an intense Deliverance-style thriller about a group of U.S. Army National Guardsmen (including Keith Carradine, Powers Boothe and Fred Ward) on weekend maneuvers in the Louisiana bayou who find themselves fighting for survival in the swamps after offending some local Cajuns. The film was seen by many as an allegory for America's involvement in the Vietnam War, although Hill denies this is the case.

He and David Giler rewrote the script prepared by another writer. According to Hill, "No studio wanted to make it, but an independent guy showed up who had a relationship with Fox. Liked it, said he would finance it."

The film was critically acclaimed but, in Hill's words, it "didn't make a... nickel anywhere. Foreign, domestic, anything... I was proud of the film... But I was disappointed in the lack of response. It was a universal audience failure... Usually you can say they loved it in Japan or something. I don't think anybody loved it anywhere."

Hill tried to make Lone Star, from the play by James McLure to star Powers Boothe and Sigourney Weaver (1981). Like Red Harvest and The Last Good Kiss it was not made.

Larry Gross later recalled meeting Hill in the early 1980s:

He'd had some success, but then he had a series of setbacks. And there was also the scandal around The Warriors; any success had been eclipsed by the killings in the theaters. So there was that, as well as the noncommercial success of Southern Comfort and Long Riders and the fact that there was a writer's strike. All of that meant that Walter hadn't worked in a while. Meaning a year or so. And what happened was the strike ended and the studios didn't have a lot of ready scripts. So this clever colleague, Larry Gordon, dusted off a script that had been shuttling around development and got it greenlit at Paramount with his friend Michael Eisner. And that script was 48 Hrs.

48 Hrs. was originally meant to star Clint Eastwood and Richard Pryor but both dropped out. Nick Nolte became attached as star and Hill's then-girlfriend, a talent agent at ICM, recommended the role of the convict be played by an exciting new comic on Saturday Night Live, Eddie Murphy. The resulting film was a problematic shoot, with many clashes between Paramount and Hill, but it resulted in a massive box office success.

Hill's box office success with 48 Hrs. enabled him to raise the money for a stylish "rock 'n' roll fable", Streets of Fire. He almost set this up at Paramount but they changed their mind; Universal decided to finance instead. Initially a box office failure, it gained a following in subsequent years (as have many of Hill's films).

Hill was meant to follow it up with a big screen adaptation of Dick Tracy, replacing John Landis. Hill worked on Dick Tracy for several drafts of the script and screenwriter Jack Epps Jr. says he "played a big role in reducing and focusing the screenplay". Hill intended to make the film directly after Streets of Fire but eventually left the project after a dispute over budget with Universal and with star Warren Beatty; the project would be made several years later with Beatty directing.

Hill's success directing Eddie Murphy in 48 Hrs. saw him receive an offer to work with Richard Pryor in a new version of Brewster's Millions (1985). This was Hill's first—and, as of 2016, only—full-fledged comedy. He says he purposefully made the film "to improve his bank account and success quotient", and admitted it was "an aberration in the career line". He added that "whatever [the film's] deficiencies, I think the wistful quality was there. I was happy about that. The picture did well and made money."

After making Brewster's Millions Hill said he had another comedy in development at Universal. He also wanted to do a new version of The Magnificent Seven (1960) which he had written with Lukas Heller, "quite a bit different from the original—it's more Hawksian in flavour." The plot had a female doctor hire seven mercenaries to defend an intellectually disabled boy from a lynching.

Hill followed Brewster's Millions with Crossroads (1986), a music-themed drama from an original script by John Fusco inspired by the life and music of Robert Johnson. The score was done by Ry Cooder, who had been Hill's most regular composer since The Long Riders. The film performed poorly at the box office, despite the presence of Ralph Macchio in the lead.

He also co-wrote (with Lukas Heller) and executive produced Blue City (1986) from a 1947 novel by Ross Macdonald. Hill developed this project intended to star a leading man in his mid-30s but by the mid-1980s a number of popular young male actors had emerged, so the script was rewritten to accommodate one of them (Judd Nelson). Hill handed over directing duties to Michelle Manning, who made her debut as director. The film was a critical and commercial disaster.

However, that year also saw the release of Aliens (1986), a sequel to Alien. Hill says he and Giler decided "the next one should be a straight action thriller -the military takes over- a patrol movie." They hired James Cameron to make the film and worked on his original treatment "a bit". Hill had a story and executive producer credit on the film which was a massive hit.

In 1987, he returned to hard-edged action with Extreme Prejudice, a contemporary Western for Carolco Pictures about the war on drugs based on a story by John Milius and Fred Rexer, which had been originally written in the mid-1970s. It reunited Hill with Nick Nolte. The film was a financial failure. Hill said he "tipped my hat to Sam [Peckinpah] a couple of times" in the film and "I don't think it was understood how much genre parodying was involved in that picture. It rather mystified a lot of American critics but it has its defenders."

Hill returned to the buddy-cop genre with Red Heat (1988), a sort of Glasnost-era reworking of 48 Hrs. with Arnold Schwarzenegger as a stoic Soviet cop who travels to Chicago to catch a Russian drug-dealer (Ed O'Ross). Schwarzenegger is partnered with a wisecracking American cop (Jim Belushi), who is as laid-back and mouthy as his Soviet counterpart is taciturn and humorless. Hill directed and rewrote Troy Kennedy Martin's script. The film, whilst profitable, was considered to be a box office disappointment compared to other Schwarzenegger films of the era.

Around this time, Hill was mentioned as wanting to make an adaptation of Jim Thompson's Pop. 1280 but it was never made. A project that was filmed was the horror anthology television series Tales from the Crypt (1989–96), on which Hill worked as an executive producer, as well as directing a number of episodes.

Hill ended the 1980s with Johnny Handsome (1989) starring Mickey Rourke. It was based on a 1972 novel by Morton Freedgood, about a criminal who has plastic surgery and seeks revenge on his colleagues who betrayed him. The project had been developed for a number of years—Hill says he turned down the job four times before deciding to do it when Harold Becker dropped out as director. The film was a flop at the box office.

Hill had a number of projects in the late 1980s that were never made. These included American Iron (1989/1990), a film set in the world of bikers written by Hill, Mark Brunet, Daniel Pyne, and John Mankiewicz. He also did a draft (with David Giler) of an adaptation of the Jim Harrison novella, Revenge—this was not used when turned into a film in 1990.

=== Later films ===
==== 1990s ====
Hill began the 1990s with the only sequel he has directed to date, Another 48 Hrs., with Murphy this time top-billed over Nolte. The sequel to his biggest commercial success was thought by many critics to be merely a retread of the original, but became the highest-grossing film that Hill has directed. The film grossed more at the US box office than its predecessor and made $72.7 million from foreign markets for a total of $153.5 million.

In 1991 he came close to directing a big screen version of the television series The Fugitive (1963–1967) with Alec Baldwin, but Baldwin was not considered a big enough star. The film The Fugitive (1993) was released two years later, starring Harrison Ford and without Hill's involvement, as the film was instead directed by Andrew Davis. Hill was also considered to replace John McTiernan as the director of Patriot Games (1992), another film in which Baldwin was recast with Ford.

In 1992, Hill directed a film originally called Looters about two firemen who cross paths with criminals while searching for stolen loot in an abandoned East St. Louis, Illinois, tenement building. However, the 1992 Los Angeles riots broke out shortly before the film's release and the studio delayed its opening, eventually changing the title to Trespass.

Trespass was based out of an old script, co-written by Bob Gale and Robert Zemeckis, years before they would write Back to the Future.

Following this, he and David Giler wrote a remake of The Killer and plans were announced to make it with Richard Gere and Denzel Washington. However the film did not proceed. He and Giler also wrote the final script for Alien 3, as well as co-producing it.

Hill planned to direct Alec Baldwin in a new version of The Getaway based on Hill's original script. Then there was a dispute over the budget and Hill left the project in order to make Geronimo: An American Legend. The film received mixed reviews from critics and fared poorly at the box office. This also happened to The Getaway (1994), which ended up being directed by Roger Donaldson from Hill's script.

In 1994, Hill and his wife, agent Hildy Gottlieb, signed a two-year non-exclusive deal with Paramount. They developed a film, Sudden Country, an action adventure in the vein of Treasure Island set in late-19th century Texas to star Elijah Wood, based on a novel by Loren Estleman. The film was not made. Instead Hill wrote and directed a second biopic, Wild Bill (1995). This too had little critical or commercial success. Hill reflected on his career in 1995:

I think every director thinks that he hasn't been allowed to make the films he wanted to make. I certainly haven't been able to make as many Westerns as I've wanted. (But) sometimes staying alive in a career sense is very important, and you think, 'Maybe I'll do this, which will do well and allow me to do that.' It's very easy to miscalculate. It's a dangerous game. But I think in the end, none of us have anybody to blame except ourselves. It can be very hard. The kinds of things that directors most want to do are usually not things the studio perceives to be commercially viable. It really is that simple. Is that true of me? Sure. Absolutely. But it's no more true of me than 50 other people I know.

Hill admitted his style of films were becoming less fashionable:

I admire a lot of what's going on out there, but the oversize kind of cartoon action movies is not something I'm terribly comfortable with. I think what I do is much more in the tradition that the bullets are real and they'll knock you down. I used to really get criticized for my lack of realism, but now I think my films are perceived to be vastly more realistic than most of the action movies that are happening out there... I think one of the things about being a director is, you should always try to re-create within yourself the kind of emotions you had watching film when you were very young. The kind of action movies that I always liked, the kind of comic books I always liked, were the serious ones. The characters were very realistic within the framework of the drama, and that kind of action movie interests me a lot more than the super-heroes. And so in that sense, maybe I'm slightly out of step, I suppose, but so be it.

Hill continued as one of the three original producers on Alien Resurrection, although he has stated in several interviews since, that he has had nothing to do with the franchise since Alien 3.

His 1996 effort Last Man Standing with Bruce Willis, a Prohibition-era Western update of Yojimbo (and thus reminiscent of that film's inspiration, Dashiell Hammett's Red Harvest, and its western incarnation, A Fistful of Dollars) saw him return to his earlier style to some extent: a gruff antihero and a heavy focus on stylized action.

Hill and the team who made Tales from the Crypt—Joel Silver, Richard Donner, Robert Zemeckis, and David Giler—tried to repeat their success with another anthology, Perversions of Science (1997). Hill worked as producer and directed an episode. However it was not as popular.

==== 2000s ====
Hill then directed the 2000 film Supernova for Metro-Goldwyn-Mayer. When the studio did not agree with his vision, they brought in Francis Ford Coppola to re-cut the film. This caused Hill to withdraw from the project and credit himself with the pseudonym "Thomas Lee" (a variation of Alan Smithee), and chose not to be associated with the finished product. Hill called his original version a much darker take than the final product.

"One, it was embarrassing and, two, it made me think about quitting," said Hill. "While Coppola's intentions were honorable, I think he made a bad situation worse. I didn't do anything for a year. I was fortunate enough that I could buy my children a hot lunch. Then, I decided I wanted to work again."

In 2002, Hill directed the prison boxing film Undisputed starring Wesley Snipes, Ving Rhames and Peter Falk.

In 2002 he said he wanted to make Vengeance is Mine, an original contemporary thriller set in Las Vegas, which he had written with Giler. It was not made. "We almost had it together a couple of times and financing always slipped away at the last second," said Hill.

In 2003, Quentin Tarantino said Hill was still worthy of admiration. "I think in the last 10 years he's had a big resurgence in creativity. I think he lost his way for a while in the '80s. Johnny Handsome I thought was a return to form . . . But I thought with Geronimo he went to a really fantastic place. Everybody talked about how boring it was. But I didn't. I thought he made a really great classic Western and America just wasn't worthy of the privilege."

Hill served as a director and consulting producer for the pilot episode of the HBO Western drama television series Deadwood in 2004. The series was created by David Milch and focused on a growing town in the Western United States. Hill's work on Deadwood has seen him return to favor in critical circles to some extent, earning him a Primetime Emmy Award for Outstanding Directing for a Drama Series in 2004 and a Directors Guild of America Award for Outstanding Directing – Drama Series in 2004. However, Hill had a falling out with Milch during the editing of the pilot and did not work on any other episodes of the show.

Hill continued his work with westerns by directing the miniseries Broken Trail, which became the highest-rated film made by a cable network when it premiered on AMC. It also earned him the Primetime Emmy Award for Outstanding Limited Series. Hill also won the Directors Guild of America Award for Outstanding Directing – Miniseries or TV Film for his efforts on Broken Trail.

In 2006 he reflected on his career saying "Those who have been doing for this for 40 years would like to think that it's a kind of Darwinian survival of the talented. But I think that's half the picture. It has as much as to do with the survival of temperament. There are few people still working now that started when I did. Not many people have the temperament to deal with that."

In 2009 Hill intended to start production on the indie crime drama St. Vincent written by Cameron Young and set to star Mickey Rourke in the lead role with Forest Whitaker, Gong Li and Ray Winstone also cast. The film was then postponed to 2010, with Pierce Brosnan, Billy Bob Thornton, Maria Bello and Giovanni Ribisi replacing them, but was cancelled before the start date.

==== 2010s ====
In the 2010s Hill described his status as "semi-retired" and said he had a number of projects fall through.

"The desirability of hiring directors over 60 is fairly diminished in this marketplace. At the same time, I hadn't had a good-sized hit in quite a while. And, frankly, I went through a couple of experiences that left me pretty disgusted with it all, and I was thinking the time had passed. I was just sitting at home reading magazines and looking out the window — a couple of projects I had had just fallen apart — when I got a call from Sly, who had sent me a script."

It was Sylvester Stallone who offered Hill the job of directing Bullet to the Head (2012). The film was not a success at the box office.

He wrote the original story for a graphic novel, Bailes Perdues, which was adapted by Matz with art by Jef, which was published in France, and later translated as Triggerman by Edward Gauvin and published by the Titan Comics imprint Hard Case Crime.

In 2016 Hill's movie The Assignment, based on a script Hill had written with Denis Hamill, premiered at the Toronto International Film Festival before a limited release and streaming video release in 2017.

In 2016 he said in an interview "You are very privileged to be a director. There is a great quote I'll get wrong of Samuel Johnson, the English poet and essayist, that: 'We come to the arena uncalled, to seek our fortune and hazard disgrace. That's the game, those are the rules.' So I say to you as an audience, if you wanna feel sorry, feel sorry for the people in Syria, but don't feel sorry for film directors."

In 2019 Hill made his recording debut at age 77 with The Cowboy Iliad: A Legend Told In The Spoken Word. Written and performed by Hill, the spoken word record tells the story of a deadly shootout that occurred in Newton, Kansas in 1871 and its legendary aftermath of violence and controversy. The record was produced by Bobby Woods and featured music by Les Deux Love Orchestra.

"The Cowboy Iliad reaches back to the spoken tradition of storytelling — designed to have no simple resolution, but a mix of history, nostalgia and speculation. And, of course, we wanted to honor the tradition of the Western... In other words, Bobby Woods and I had a couple of shooters and made a record." — Walter Hill

==== 2020s ====
In August 2021 Hill began shooting the upcoming western Dead for a Dollar starring Christoph Waltz, Willem Dafoe, and Rachel Brosnahan. The film premiered at 2022 Venice Film Festival where Hill received the Glory to the Filmmaker award. It was released in the United States in September 2022.

For his next project Hill said he would be "going back to film noir", and that he hoped to direct "a couple" undisclosed films. He later told Austin's KXAN that he's "got a kind of a low-budget movie I'm trying to put together", set to shoot in Los Angeles.

== Personal life ==
Hill married Hildy Gottlieb, a talent agent at International Creative Management, in New York City at Tavern on the Green on September 7, 1986. They have two daughters, Joanna and Miranda.

== Filmography ==
=== Film ===
Year	Title	Director	Writer	Producer
1972	Hickey & Boggs	No	Yes	No
1972	The Getaway	No	Yes	No
1973	The Mackintosh Man	No	Yes	No
1973	The Thief Who Came to Dinner	No	Yes	No
1975	The Drowning Pool	No	Yes	No
1975	Hard Times	Yes	Yes	No
1978	The Driver	Yes	Yes	No
1979	The Warriors	Yes	Yes	No
1980	The Long Riders	Yes	No	No
1981	Southern Comfort	Yes	Yes	No
1982	48 Hrs.	Yes	Yes	No
1984	Streets of Fire	Yes	Yes	No
1985	Brewster's Millions	Yes	No	No
1986	Crossroads	Yes	No	No
1986	Blue City	No	Yes	Yes
1986	Aliens	No	Story	Executive
1987	Extreme Prejudice	Yes	No	No
1988	Red Heat	Yes	Yes	Yes
1989	Johnny Handsome	Yes	No	No
1990	Another 48 Hrs.	Yes	No	No
1992	Alien 3	No	Yes	Yes
1992	Trespass	Yes	No	No
1993	Geronimo: An American Legend	Yes	No	Yes
1994	The Getaway	No	Yes	No
1995	Wild Bill	Yes	Yes	No
1996	Last Man Standing	Yes	Yes	Yes
2000	Supernova	Yes (Note: Credited as "Thomas Lee")	No	No
2002	Undisputed	Yes	Yes	Yes
2012	Bullet to the Head	Yes	No	No
2016	The Assignment	Yes	Yes	No
2022	Dead for a Dollar	Yes	Yes	No

Producer only

- Alien (1979)
- Rustlers' Rhapsody (1985)
- Demon Knight (1995)
- W.E.I.R.D. World (1995)
- Bordello of Blood (1996)
- Alien Resurrection (1997)
- Ritual (2002)
- Alien vs. Predator (2004)
- Aliens vs. Predator: Requiem (2007)
- Prometheus (2012)
- Alien: Covenant (2017)
- Alien: Romulus (2024)

=== Television ===
Year	Title	Director	Writer	Producer	Notes
1977	Dog and Cat	No	Yes	No	Credited under a pseudonym
1989–1991	Tales from the Crypt	Yes	Yes	Executive	Directed 3 episodes
1992	Two-Fisted Tales	No	No	Executive	TV movie
1997	Perversions of Science	Yes	No	Executive	Directed 1 episode
2004	Deadwood	Yes	No	No	1 episode
2006	Broken Trail	Yes	No	Yes	Directed 2 episodes
2010	Madso's War	Yes	No	No	TV movie, credited as Rob Marcus

=== Unrealized projects ===
Year	Title and description	Ref(s)
1960s	An untitled semi-autobiographical film about a love affair	
1960s	The Drifters, retitled from Lloyd Williams and His Brother, a Western for Sam Peckinpah to direct starring Ryan O'Neal	
1970s	Alien	
1970s	The Gauntlet starring Kris Kristofferson as Detective Ben Shockley	
1970s	The Last Gun, a Western set in 1915 co-written with Roger Spottiswoode	
1970s	White Hunter Black Heart	
1980s	A film adaptation of James Crumley's novel The Last Good Kiss	
1980s	A film adaptation of Dashiell Hammett's novel Red Harvest	
1980s	A film adaptation of James McLure's one-act play Lone Star starring Sigourney Weaver and Powers Boothe	
1980s	A film adaptation of Jim Harrison's novella Revenge co-written with David Giler for John Huston to direct	
1980s	The Far City, a sequel to Streets of Fire and the second film in a planned trilogy centered on the Tom Cody character played by Michael Paré	
1980s	Cody's Return, the third film in a planned trilogy centered on the Tom Cody character played by Michael Paré	
1980s	A film adaptation of the comic strip series Dick Tracy co-written with Jack Epps Jr.	
1980s	An untitled comedy film	
1980s	A remake of the 1960 film The Magnificent Seven co-written with Lukas Heller	
1980s	Rock 'n Roll Detective, retitled from Rhythm and Blues, a film written by Barry Beckerman	
1980s	A film adaptation of Jim Thompson's novel Pop. 1280	
1980s	American Iron, a biker film co-written with Mark Brunet, Daniel Pyne and John Mankiewicz	
1990s	The Fugitive starring Alec Baldwin as Dr. Richard Kimble	
1990s	Patriot Games	
1990s	Hong Kong, a remake of the 1989 film The Killer co-written with David Giler starring Richard Gere and Denzel Washington	
1990s	A film adaptation of the EC Comics series Tales from the Crypt	
1990s	The Getaway	
1990s	A film adaptation of Loren D. Estleman's novel Sudden Country starring Elijah Wood	
1990s	Icarus, an action thriller written by Robert Stitzel and Patrick Duncan starring Bruce Willis	
1990s	A film adaptation of the 1960s TV series Combat! written by William Wisher Jr. starring Bruce Willis, John Goodman and Quentin Tarantino	
1990s	Red White Black and Blue, a 1970s-set cop drama written by Andrew Kevin Walker starring Woody Harrelson and Vince Vaughn	
1990s	"The Doctor" and "Heat Wave", two segments from the unmade horror anthology film Really Scary	
1990s	Persona Non Grata, a film written by Rich Leder and Ken Friedman about a big-game hunter tracking down an assassin on a transatlantic freighter	
2000s	Little Sister, retitled from Vengeance Is Mine, a cop thriller set in Las Vegas co-written with David Giler	
2000s	Live, a biopic about the life of Richard Pryor written by Caleb Kane starring Mike Epps	
2000s	St. Vincent, indie crime drama written by Cameron Young starring Samuel L. Jackson, Jim Caviezel and Al Pacino	
2000s	Unknown, a low-budget science fiction film starring Sigourney Weaver	
2010s	A remake of the 1962 film What Ever Happened to Baby Jane?	
2010s	Unspecified episodes of a ten-hour series adaptation of To Live and Die in L.A. written by Robert Moresco	
2010s	Unspecified episodes of the second season of Goliath	
2020s	An untitled noir film	
2020s	An untitled Alien sequel starring Sigourney Weaver as Ellen Ripley	

== Awards and nominations ==
The Writers Guild of America West granted Hill the 2024 Laurel Award for screenwriting achievement.

Year	Title	Award/Nomination
1980	The Long Riders	Nominated – Palme d'Or
1986	Blue City	Nominated – Golden Raspberry Award for Worst Picture
1992	Alien 3	Nominated – Saturn Award for Best Writing
2004	Alien vs. Predator	Nominated – Golden Raspberry Award for Worst Prequel, Remake, Rip-off or Sequel
2004	Deadwood	DGA Award for Outstanding Directing – Drama Series; Primetime Emmy Award for Outstanding Directing for a Drama Series
2006	Broken Trail	DGA Award for Outstanding Directing – Television Film
2007	Aliens vs. Predator: Requiem	Nominated – Golden Raspberry Award for Worst Prequel, Remake, Rip-off or Sequel

== Sources ==
Interviews

- Cotter, Marianne (September 1994). "Walter Hill Rides the Western Wave". MovieMaker. Archived from the original on December 18, 2010.
- Zelazny, Jon (December 8, 2012). "Kicking Ass with Walter Hill". The Hollywood Interview.
- Gross, Larry (Winter 1993). "Walter Hill". BOMB. No. 42.
- Sragow, Michael (July 1982). "Don't Jesse James Me". Sight and Sound. pp. 194–198.
