= David Giler =

American film producer (1943–2020)

- Born: David Kevin Giler; July 23, 1943; New York City, U.S.
- Died: December 19, 2020 (aged 77); Bangkok, Thailand
- Occupations: Film/television producer, screenwriter
- Years active: 1962–2017
- Notable work: Alien; The Parallax View
- Spouse: Nancy Kwan (m. 1970; div. 1972)

David Kevin Giler (July 23, 1943 – December 19, 2020) was an American film and television producer and screenwriter who had been active in the film industry since the early 1960s.

== Career ==
=== Television ===
Giler's father Bernie (1908–1967) was a writer. Giler began his career collaborating with his father for television programs such as The Gallant Men ("Signals for an End Run") (1962), Kraft Suspense Theatre ("Leviathan Five") (1964), Burke's Law ("Who Killed the Man on the White Horse?") (1965), and The Girl from U.N.C.L.E. ("The Low Blue C Affair") (1967).

Giler's father died in 1967 and he began to be credited on his own on such shows as The Man from U.N.C.L.E. ("The Matterhorn Affair") (1967), and The Bold Ones: The Lawyers ("The Crowd Pleaser") (1969).

=== Features ===
Giler had begun writing feature films. In 1968 he was reportedly writing a script called Our Bag.

His first produced credit was the critically reviled Myra Breckinridge, an adaptation of Gore Vidal's controversial novel. The resulting movie was a disaster but Giler's script – heavily rewritten by director Michael Sarne – was much praised. He wrote a remake of The Postman Always Rings Twice and adapted The King Must Die but both were shelved. He did some uncredited rewriting on Skin Game (1971).

He was credited on The Parallax View (1974). In 1975 Giler turned to directing, his only film in that capacity, The Black Bird.

Giler wrote Fun with Dick and Jane (1977) and an adaptation of Fear of Flying that was never filmed.

=== Walter Hill ===
Giler formed the production company Brandywine Productions with Walter Hill and Gordon Carroll and in 1979, the trio co-produced and rewrote the script for the legendary sci-fi horror thriller, Alien. He and Hill became embroiled in a much-publicized behind-the-scenes fight with Alien's original writer, Dan O'Bannon, over who was to receive screenplay credit. Giler and Hill claimed they completely rewrote the script and therefore wanted to relegate O'Bannon to a 'story by' credit only. O'Bannon claimed they did little more than change the names of the characters and dialogue. Ultimately, O'Bannon was the only one to receive credit for the screenplay in the final film, alongside a 'story by' co-credit with Ronald Shusett.

Giler and Hill later wrote Southern Comfort, and wrote the storyline, alongside James Cameron, that became the basis for Cameron's 1986 sequel, Aliens.

Giler on his own wrote the comedy The Money Pit (1986). He did an uncredited rewrite on Beverly Hills Cop II (1987) and produced Rustlers' Rhapsody (1985). He wrote a remake of The Decline of the American Empire which was not filmed.

Hill and Giler executive produced Tales from the Crypt and Tales from the Cryptkeeper for cable channel HBO. They returned to the Alien franchise, producing (and co-writing with Larry Ferguson) Alien 3 (1992). They were credited as producers on Alien Resurrection (1997) but had minimal involvement with it; the same applies for the other sequels.

Giler and Hill wrote and produced Undisputed.

== Personal life ==
Giler was married to actress Nancy Kwan from 1970 until their divorce in 1972.

On December 19, 2020, he died of cancer at his home in Bangkok.

== Filmography ==
=== Films ===
Title	Year	Writer	Producer	Director	Notes
Myra Breckinridge	1970	Yes	No	Mike Sarne	Also uncredited producer
The Parallax View	1974	Yes	No	Alan J. Pakula	
The Black Bird	1975	Yes	No	Himself	Directorial Debut
Fun with Dick and Jane	1977	Yes	No	Ted Kotcheff	
Alien	1979	No	Yes	Ridley Scott	Also uncredited script revisions
Southern Comfort	1981	Yes	Yes	Walter Hill	
Rustlers' Rhapsody	1985	No	Yes	Hugh Wilson	
The Money Pit	1986	Yes	Executive	Richard Benjamin	
Aliens	1986	Story	Executive	James Cameron	
Let It Ride	1989	No	Yes	Joe Pytka	
Alien 3	1992	Yes	Yes	David Fincher	
Demon Knight	1995	No	Executive	Ernest Dickerson	Based on Tales from the Crypt television series
Bordello of Blood	1996	No	Executive	Gilbert Adler	Based on Tales from the Crypt television series
Alien Resurrection	1997	No	Yes	Jean-Pierre Jeunet	
Undisputed	2002	Yes	Yes	Walter Hill	
Ritual	2002	No	Yes	Avi Nesher	Based on Tales from the Crypt television series
Alien vs. Predator	2004	No	Yes	Paul W. S. Anderson	
Aliens vs. Predator: Requiem	2007	No	Yes	The Brothers Strause	
Prometheus	2012	No	Yes	Ridley Scott	
Alien: Covenant	2017	No	Yes	Ridley Scott	

Uncredited written works
Title	Year	Notes
Skin Game	1971	Directed by Paul Bogart
First Blood	1982	Directed by Ted Kotcheff
Beverly Hills Cop II	1987	Directed by Tony Scott

=== Television ===
Title	Year	Writer	Producer	Notes
The Gallant Men	1962	Yes	No	Episode: "Signals for an End Run"
Kraft Suspense Theatre	1964	Yes	No	Episode: "Leviathan Five"
Burke's Law	1965	Yes	No	Episode: "Who Killed the Man on the White Horse?"
The Girl from U.N.C.L.E.	1967	Yes	No	Episode: "The Low Blue C Affair"
The Man from U.N.C.L.E.	1967	Yes	No	Episode: "The Matterhorn Affair"
The Bold Ones: The Lawyers	1969	Story	No	Episode: "The Crowd Pleaser"
Tales from the Crypt	1989–1996	No	Executive	93 episodes
Two-Fisted Tales	1992	No	Executive	Television film
Tales from the Cryptkeeper	1993–1994	No	Executive	5 episodes
Rebel Highway	1994	No	Yes	4 episodes
W.E.I.R.D. World	1995	No	Executive	Television film
Perversions of Science	1997	No	Executive	10 episodes
