= Brandywine Productions =

American film production company

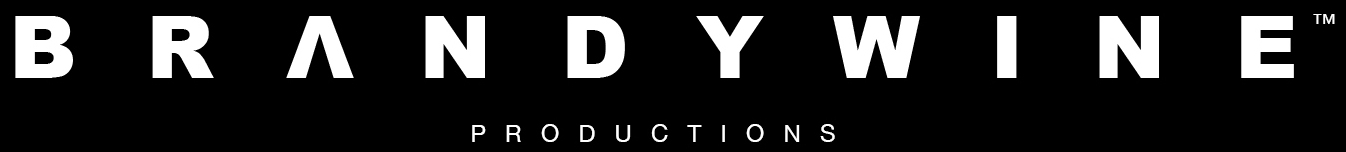
- Company type: Private
- Industry: Film
- Founded: 1969; 57 years ago
- Founder: Walter Hill; David Giler; Gordon Carroll
- Headquarters: United States
- Products: Motion pictures

Brandywine Productions is an American film production company known for its Alien film series, founded in 1969 by American filmmakers Walter Hill, David Giler, and Gordon Carroll.

== Films ==
Year	Title	Director	Co-producer	Notes	Budget	Gross
1969	Women in Love	Ken Russell	Co-production with United Artists	as Brandywine Productions Ltd	$1.6 million	$4.5 million
1976	The Student Body	Gus Trikonis				$1,075,000
1979	Alien	Ridley Scott	Co-production with 20th Century Fox		$9–11 million	$104.9–203.6 million
1986	Aliens	James Cameron	Co-production with 20th Century Fox		$17–18 million	$131.1–183.3 million
1992	Alien 3	David Fincher	Co-production with 20th Century Fox		$50 million	$159.8 million
1997	Alien Resurrection	Jean-Pierre Jeunet	Co-production with 20th Century Fox		$70 million	$161.3 million
2004	Alien vs. Predator	Paul W. S. Anderson	Co-production with 20th Century Fox and Davis Entertainment	as Brandywine	$60 million	$172.5 million
2007	Aliens vs. Predator: Requiem	Colin Strause and Greg Strause	Co-production with 20th Century Fox and Davis Entertainment	as Brandywine	$40 million	$128.8 million
2012	Prometheus	Ridley Scott	Co-production with 20th Century Fox and Scott Free Productions	as Brandywine	$120–130 million	$403.4 million
2016	She Walks	Zachary Lee Ratchford				
2017	Alien: Covenant	Ridley Scott	Co-production with 20th Century Fox and Scott Free Productions		$97 million	$240.7 million
2024	Alien: Romulus	Fede Álvarez	Co-production with 20th Century Studios and Scott Free Productions		$80 million	$350.9 million
