= Alien 3 =

1992 film by David Fincher

- Theatrical release poster
- Directed by: David Fincher
- Screenplay by: David Giler; Walter Hill; Larry Ferguson
- Story by: Vincent Ward
- Based on: Characters by: Dan O'Bannon; Ronald Shusett
- Produced by: Gordon Carroll; David Giler; Walter Hill
- Starring: Sigourney Weaver; Charles S. Dutton; Charles Dance; Lance Henriksen
- Cinematography: Alex Thomson
- Edited by: Terry Rawlings
- Music by: Elliot Goldenthal
- Production companies: 20th Century Fox; Brandywine Productions
- Distributed by: 20th Century Fox
- Release date: May 22, 1992
- Running time: 114 minutes
- Country: United States
- Language: English
- Budget: $50–60 million
- Box office: $159.8–180 million

Alien 3 (stylized as ALIEN^{3}) is a 1992 American science fiction horror film directed by David Fincher and written by David Giler, Walter Hill, and Larry Ferguson, from a story by Vincent Ward. Starring Sigourney Weaver reprising her role as Ellen Ripley, it is the third installment of the Alien franchise.

Set immediately after the events of Aliens (1986), Ripley and an Alien organism are the only survivors of the Colonial Marine spaceship Sulaco following an escape pod's crash on a planet housing a penal colony populated by violent male inmates. Additional roles are played by Charles Dance, Brian Glover, Charles S. Dutton, Ralph Brown, Paul McGann, Danny Webb, Lance Henriksen, Holt McCallany, Pete Postlethwaite, and Danielle Edmond. The film had a troubled production, facing numerous problems, including shooting without a script and the attachment of various screenwriters and directors. Fincher, in his feature directorial debut, was eventually brought in to direct after a proposed version with Ward as director was canceled during pre-production.

Alien 3 was released by 20th Century Fox on May 22, 1992. While it underperformed at the American box office, it earned over $100 million outside North America. The film received mixed reviews and was regarded as inferior to previous installments. Fincher has since disowned the film, deeming it unfaithful to his original vision due to studio interference. It was nominated for an Academy Award for Best Visual Effects, seven Saturn Awards (Best Science Fiction Film, Best Actress for Weaver, Best Supporting Actor for Dutton, Best Direction for Fincher, and Best Writing for Giler, Hill, and Ferguson), a Hugo Award for Best Dramatic Presentation, and an MTV Movie Award for Best Action Sequence. A sequel, Alien Resurrection, followed in 1997. In 2003, an extended and revised version of the film known as the Assembly Cut was released without Fincher's involvement, which received a warmer reception.

== Plot ==
Shortly after escaping the planet LV-426, (Note: As depicted in Aliens (1986)) the Colonial Marine spaceship Sulaco is travelling back to Earth with Ellen Ripley, Rebecca "Newt" Jorden, Cpl. Hicks, and the damaged android Bishop in cryonic stasis. An alien egg hatches on board, releasing a facehugger that attacks the crew. A fire starts and the ship's computer ejects an escape pod with the crew still in their stasis chambers. The pod crash-lands on Fiorina "Fury" 161, a foundry and maximum-security correctional facility inhabited by male inmates with a genetic predisposition for antisocial behavior. The inmates recover the crashed pod and its passengers. The facehugger approaches inmate Thomas Murphy's dog, Spike.

Ripley is awakened by Clemens, the prison's chief medical officer, who informs her that she is the sole survivor. The prison warden, Harold Andrews, says that her presence may have disruptive effects. Ripley insists that Clemens perform an autopsy on Newt and that her and Hicks's bodies be subsequently burned, fearing that Newt may be carrying an Alien embryo. Despite protests from the warden and his assistant Aaron, the autopsy is conducted and no embryo is found. The funeral proceeds with spiritual leader Dillon eulogizing the deceased as their bodies are dropped into the furnace. Elsewhere in the prison, a quadrupedal alien bursts from Spike.

Ripley finds the damaged Bishop in the prison's garbage dump before being cornered by four inmates. After being saved by Dillon, Ripley returns to the infirmary and re-activates Bishop, who, before asking to be permanently shut down, confirms that a Facehugger came with them to Fiorina, under knowledge of the Weyland-Yutani Corporation. Growing to full size, the alien kills Murphy, Boggs, and Rains. The shock returns outcast prisoner Golic to his previously psychopathic state. Ripley informs Andrews of her previous Xenomorph encounters (Note: The Alien species is defined as "Xenomorph" within the previous film Aliens, and is later referred to as "Xenomorph" by Ripley when she is sending an email to Weyland-Yutani.) and suggests everyone work together to hunt down and kill it. However, the facility is without weapons; their only hope is the rescue ship being sent for Ripley by Weyland-Yutani.

The Alien ambushes Ripley and Clemens in the prison infirmary, killing him, and cornering her. However, it mysteriously spares her and retreats. Ripley rushes to the cafeteria to warn the others. Andrews orders Aaron to take her back to the infirmary, but the warden himself is dragged into the vents and killed by the Alien. Ripley rallies the inmates and proposes they pour flammable toxic waste into the ventilation system and ignite it to flush out the Alien. However, its intervention causes a premature explosion and several inmates die. With Aaron's help, Ripley scans herself using the escape pod's medical equipment and sees the embryo of an Alien Queen growing inside her. Upon this discovery, she realizes that there were two facehuggers on the Sulaco, and that Weyland-Yutani plans on capturing the alien incubating inside her in hopes of turning it into biological weapons.

The Alien will not kill her because of the embryo she is carrying, so Ripley begs Dillon to do it; he agrees only if she helps the inmates kill the Alien first. They form a plan to lure the Alien into the foundry's molding facility, trap it, and drown it in molten lead. The bait-and-chase plan results in the deaths of every remaining prisoner but Dillon and Morse. Dillon sacrifices himself to position the Alien towards the mold as Morse pours the molten lead onto them. Although the Alien is covered in molten metal, it escapes the mold. Ripley activates the fire sprinklers, blowing the Alien apart from thermal shock.

The Weyland–Yutani team arrives, including commandos and a man who looks identical to Bishop who says he is Bishop's creator. (Note: Identified as "Michael Bishop Weyland" in tie-in materials.) He tries to persuade Ripley to undergo surgery to remove the Alien Queen embryo, claiming it will be destroyed. Ripley refuses and steps back onto a mobile platform, which Morse positions over the furnace. The Weyland–Yutani team shoots Morse in the leg to stop him; Aaron strikes the Bishop look-alike with a wrench and is shot dead by the commandos. Ignoring pleas to give them the embryo, Ripley throws herself into the furnace, holding captive the infant queen as it erupts from her. The facilities are closed down. Morse, the sole survivor, is led away as Ripley's final logbook recording from the Nostromo plays.

== Cast ==
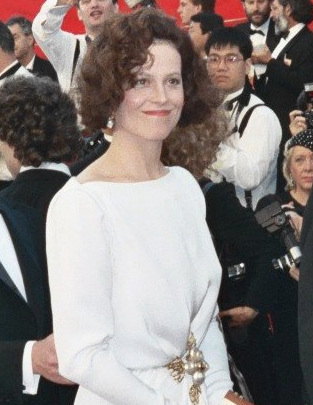
Sigourney Weaver reprised her role as Ellen Ripley

- Sigourney Weaver as Ellen Ripley, reprising her role from the previous two Alien films. Ripley crash-lands on Fiorina 161 and is once again burdened with the task of destroying another of the alien creatures. Weaver approved of David Twohy's script and signed on, but demanded a larger salary of $4–5 million, plus co-producing credit. She also requested for the action not to rely on guns.
- Charles S. Dutton as Leonard Dillon, one of Fiorina's inmates who functions as the spiritual and de facto leader amongst the prisoners and attempts to keep the peace in the facility.
- Charles Dance as Jonathan Clemens, a former inmate who now serves as the facility's doctor. He treats Ripley after her escape pod crashes at the start of the film and forms a special bond with her. Before he is killed by the Alien, Clemens laments to Ripley why he was originally sent to Fiorina, describing it as "more than a little melodramatic". Fincher initially offered the role to Richard E. Grant, hoping to reunite him with Withnail and I co-stars Ralph Brown and Paul McGann.
- Brian Glover as Harold Andrews, the prison warden. He believes Ripley's presence will cause disruption amongst the inmates and attempts to control the rumors surrounding her and the creature. He rejects her claims about the existence of such a creature, only to be killed by it.
- Ralph Brown as Francis Aaron, the assistant of Superintendent Andrews. The prisoners refer to him by the nickname "85", after his IQ score, which annoys him. He opposes Ripley's insistence that the prisoners must try to fight the Alien, and repudiates her claim that Weyland–Yutani will collect the alien instead of them.
- Paul McGann as Walter Golic. A mass-murderer and outcast amongst the prison population, Golic becomes very disturbed after being assaulted by the Alien in the prison's underground network of tunnels, gradually becoming more and more obsessed with the Alien. In the Assembly Cut of the film, his obsession with and defense of the creature lead to murder and his own demise, and his actions jeopardize the entire plan.
- Danny Webb as Robert Morse, an acerbic, self-centered, and cynical prisoner. Despite being wounded by the Weyland–Yutani team, Morse is the only survivor from the entire Fiorina 161 population (including Ripley).
- Lance Henriksen as the voice of the damaged Bishop android, as well as a character credited as Bishop II. He appears in the film's final scenes, claiming to be the human designer of the Bishop android, and wants the Alien Queen that was growing inside Ripley for use in Weyland-Yutani's bioweapons division. The character is named as "Michael Bishop Weyland" in certain tie-in materials.
- Tom Woodruff Jr. as the Alien known as "Dragon". This Alien is different from the ones in previous installments due to its host being quadrupedal (a dog in the theatrical cut, an ox in the Assembly Cut). Initially a visual effects supervisor, Woodruff decided to take the role of the creature after his company, Amalgamated Dynamics, was hired by Fox. Woodruff said that, following Sigourney Weaver's advice, he approaches the role as an actor instead of a stuntman, trying to make his performance more than "just a guy in a suit". He considered the acting process "as much physical as it is mental".
- Pete Postlethwaite as David Postlethwaite, an inmate smarter than most who is killed by the Alien in the bait-and-chase sequence.
- Holt McCallany as Junior, the leader of the group of inmates who attempt to rape Ripley. He has a tattoo of a tear drop underneath his right eye. In the Assembly Cut, he sacrifices himself to trap the Alien as redemption.
- Peter Guinness as Peter Gregor, one of the inmates who attempts to rape Ripley; he is bitten in the neck and killed by the Alien during the bait-and-chase sequence.
- Danielle Edmond as Rebecca "Newt" Jorden, the child Ripley forms a maternal bond with in the previous film who briefly returns as a corpse being autopsied. Carrie Henn, the original actress, was unable to reprise the role due to her age so Danielle Edmond took over the part for the brief shots of Newt in her cryotube and the later autopsy scene with her corpse.
- Christopher Fairbank as Thomas Murphy.
- Phil Davis as Kevin Dodd.
- Vincenzo Nicoli as Alan Jude.
- Leon Herbert as Edward Boggs.
- Niall Buggy as Eric Buggy.
- Hi Ching as Company Man.
- Carl Chase as Frank Ellis.
- Clive Mantle as Clive William.
- DeObia Oparei as Arthur Walkingstick.
- Paul Brennen as Yoshi Troy.

An archive picture of Michael Biehn as Corporal Dwayne Hicks appears.

== Production ==
=== Development ===
With the success of Aliens, 20th Century Fox approached Brandywine Productions on further sequels. But Brandywine was less than enthused with an Alien 3 project, with producer David Giler later explaining he and partners Walter Hill and Gordon Carroll wanted to take new directions as "we wouldn't do a repeat of one and two". The trio opted to explore the duplicity of the Weyland-Yutani Corporation, and why they were so intent in using the Aliens as biological weapons. Various concepts were discussed, eventually settling on a two-part story, with the treatment for the third film featuring "the underhanded Weyland–Yutani Corporation facing off with a militarily aggressive culture of humans whose rigid socialist ideology has caused them to separate from Earth's society." Michael Biehn's Corporal Hicks would be promoted to protagonist in the third film, with Sigourney Weaver's character of Ellen Ripley reduced to a cameo appearance before returning in the fourth installment, "an epic battle with alien warriors mass-produced by the expatriated Earthlings." Weaver liked the Cold War metaphor, and agreed to a smaller role, particularly due to a dissatisfaction with Fox, which removed scenes from Aliens crucial to Ripley's backstory.

I felt that Ripley was going to become a burden to the story ... There are only so many aspects to that character you can do.

— Sigourney Weaver, concerning the future of Ripley.

Although Fox was skeptical about the idea, they agreed to finance the development of the story, but asked that Hill and Giler attempt to get Ridley Scott, director of Alien, to make Alien 3. They also asked that the two films be shot back to back to lessen the production costs. While Scott was interested in returning to the franchise, it did not work out due to the director's busy schedule (he was then working on 1492: Conquest of Paradise).

=== William Gibson script ===
In September 1987, Giler and Hill approached cyberpunk author William Gibson to write the script for the third film. Gibson, who told the producers his writing was influenced by Alien, accepted the task. Fearful of an impending strike by the Writers Guild of America, Brandywine asked Gibson to deliver a screenplay by December. Gibson drew heavily from Giler and Hill's treatment, having a strong interest in the "Marxist space empire" element. The following year, Finnish director Renny Harlin was approached by Fox based on his work in A Nightmare on Elm Street 4: The Dream Master. Harlin wanted to go in different directions from the first two movies, having interest in both visiting the Alien homeworld or having the Aliens invading Earth.

Gibson mockingly summed up his script as "Space commies hijack alien eggs—big problem in Mallworld". The story picked up after Aliens, with the Sulaco drifting into an area of space claimed by the "Union of Progressive Peoples". The ship is boarded by people from the UPP, who are attacked by a facehugger hiding in the entrails of Bishop's mangled body. The soldiers blast the facehugger into space and take Bishop with them for further study. The Sulaco then arrives at a space station–shopping mall hybrid named Anchorpoint. With Ripley put in a coma, Hicks explores the station and discovers Weyland-Yutani are developing an Alien army. In the meantime, the UPP are doing their own research, which led them to repair Bishop. Eventually Anchorpoint and the UPP stations are overrun with the Aliens, and Hicks must team up with the survivors to destroy the parasites. The film ends with a teaser for a fourth movie, where Bishop suggests to Hicks that humans are united against a common enemy, and they must track the Aliens to their source and destroy them.

The screenplay was very action-oriented, featuring an extended cast, and is considered in some circles as superior to the final film and has a considerable following on the Internet. The producers were on the whole unsatisfied with the screenplay, which Giler described as "a perfectly executed script that wasn't all that interesting", particularly for not taking new directions with the initial pitch. They still liked certain parts, such as the subtext making the Alien a metaphor for HIV, but felt it lacking the human element present in Aliens and Gibson's trademark cyberpunk aesthetic. Following the end of the WGA strike, Gibson was asked to make rewrites with Harlin, but declined, citing various other commitments and "foot dragging on the producers' part." On July 12, 2018, it was announced that William Gibson's unmade screenplay of Alien 3 would be adapted into a comic series. As part of Alien's 40th anniversary, on May 30, 2019, a full-cast audio drama of William Gibson's unproduced screenplay of Alien 3 was released and made available on Audible, with both Michael Biehn and Lance Henriksen reprising their film-roles. Both are based on the second draft. 2021 saw another adaptation of the screenplay, this time as a novel written by Pat Cadigan from Titan Books and based instead on the first draft.

=== Eric Red script ===
Following Gibson's departure, Harlin suggested screenwriter Eric Red, writer of the cult horror films The Hitcher and Near Dark. Red worked less than two months to deliver his draft in February 1989, which led him to later describe his Alien 3 work as "the one script I completely disown because it was not 'my script'. It was the rushed product of too many story conferences and interference with no time to write, and turned out utter crap." His approach had a completely new set of characters and subplots, while also introducing new breeds of the Alien. The plot opened with a team of Special Forces marines boarding the Sulaco and finding that all survivors had fallen victim to the aliens. Afterwards, it moved into a small-town U.S. city in a type of bio-dome in space, culminating in an all-out battle with the townsfolk facing hordes of Alien warriors. Brandywine rejected Red's script for deviating too much from their story, and eventually gave up on developing two sequels simultaneously.

=== David Twohy script ===
Writer David Twohy was next to work on the project, being instructed to start with Gibson's script. Once the fall of Communism made the Cold War analogies outdated, Twohy changed his setting to a prison planet, which was being used for illegal experiments on the aliens for biological warfare. Harlin felt this approach was too similar to the previous movies, and, tired of the development hell, walked out on the project, which led Fox to offer Harlin The Adventures of Ford Fairlane.

Twohy's script was delivered to Fox president Joe Roth, who did not like the idea of Ripley being removed, declaring that "Sigourney Weaver is the centerpiece of the series" and Ripley was "really the only female warrior we have in our movie mythology". Weaver was then called, with a reported $4 million salary, plus a share of the box office receipts. She also requested the story to be suitably impressive, original, and non-dependent on guns. Twohy duly set about writing Ripley into his screenplay.

=== Start-up with Vincent Ward ===
Once Hill attended a screening of The Navigator: A Medieval Odyssey, he decided to invite its director, Vincent Ward. Ward, who was in London developing Map of the Human Heart, accepted the project only on the third call, as he at first was uninterested in doing a sequel. Ward thought little of the Twohy script, and instead worked up another idea, involving Ripley's escape pod crash landing on a monastery-like satellite. Having developed this pitch on his flight to Los Angeles, once Ward got with the studio executives he saw his idea approved by the studio. Ward was hired to direct Alien 3, and writer John Fasano was hired to expand his story into a screenplay. Once Twohy discovered through a journalist friend that another script was being written concurrently with his, he went after Fox and eventually left the project.

Ward envisioned a planet whose interior was both wooden and archaic in design, where Luddite-like monks would take refuge. The story begins with a monk who sees a "star in the East" (Ripley's escape pod) and at first believes this to be a good omen. Upon arrival of Ripley, and with increasing suggestions of the Alien presence, the monk inhabitants believe it to be some sort of religious trial for their misdemeanors, punishable by the creature that haunts them. By having a woman in their monastery, they wonder if their trial is partially caused by sexual temptation, as Ripley is the only woman to be amongst the all-male community in ten years. To avoid this belief and (hopefully) the much grimmer reality of what she has brought with her, the monks of the "wooden satellite" lock Ripley into a dungeon-like sewer and ignore her advice on the true nature of the beast. The monks believe that the Alien is in fact the Devil. Primarily though, this story was about Ripley's own soul-searching complicated by the seeding of the Alien within her and further hampered by her largely solo attempts to defeat it. Eventually Ripley decides to sacrifice herself to kill the Alien. Fox asked for an alternative ending in which Ripley survived, but Weaver would agree to the film only if Ripley died.

Empire magazine described Ward's 'Wooden Planet' concept as 'undeniably attractive—it would have been visually arresting and at the very least, could have made for some astonishing action sequences.' In the same article, Norman Reynolds—the production designer originally hired by Ward—remembers an early design idea for "a wooden library shaft. You looked at the books on this wooden platform that went up and down". 'Imagine the kind of vertical jeopardy sequence that could have been staged here—the Alien clambering up these impossibly high bookshelves as desperate monks work the platform'. Sigourney Weaver described Ward's overall concept as "very original and arresting". Former Times journalist David Hughes included Ward's version of Alien 3 amongst "The Greatest Sci-Fi Movies Never Made" in his book of this title.

However, the concept was divisive among the production crew. The producers at Brandywine discussed the logical problems of creating and maintaining a wooden planet in space, while Fox executive Jon Landau considered Ward's vision to be "more on the artsy-fartsy side than on the big commercial side" that Ridley Scott and James Cameron employed. Ward managed to dissuade the producers of their idea of turning the planet into an ore refinery and the monks into prisoners, but eventually Fox asked for a meeting with the director imposing a list of changes to be made. Refusing to do so, Ward was dismissed from the project. The main plot of the finished film still follows Ward's basic structure.

=== Walter Hill and David Giler's script ===
Hill and Giler did a first draft trying to enhance the story structure on the Fasano script, and feeling creatively drained, hired Larry Ferguson as a script doctor. Ferguson's work was not well received in the production, particularly by Sigourney Weaver, who felt Ferguson made Ripley sound like "a pissed-off gym teacher". Short on time before filming was due to commence, Hill and Giler took control of the screenplay themselves, melding aspects of the Ward/Fasano script with Twohy's earlier prison planet screenplay to create the basis of the final film. Sigourney Weaver had also had a clause written into her contract stating the final draft should be written by Hill and Giler, believing that they were the only writers (besides James Cameron) to write the character of Ripley effectively. Fox approached music video director David Fincher to replace Ward. Fincher did further work on the screenplay with author Rex Pickett, and despite Pickett being fired and Hill and Giler writing the final draft of the screenplay, he revised most of the work done by the previous authors. Fincher wanted Gary Oldman to star in the film, but the pair "couldn't work it out".

=== Filming ===
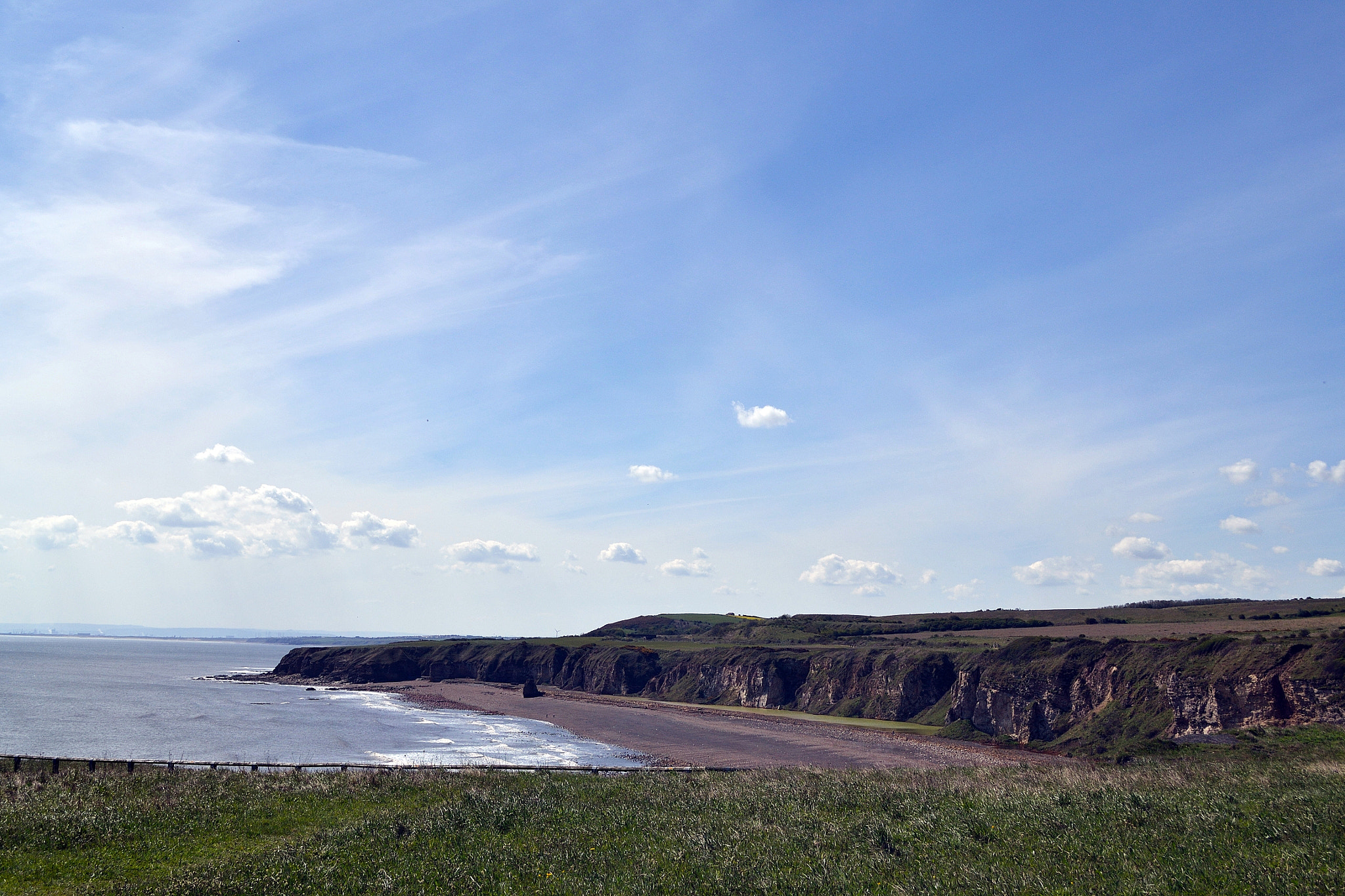
Blast Beach near Dawdon in England was used for exterior shots of the planet Fiorina "Fury" 161.

Filming began on January 14, 1991, at Pinewood Studios without a finished script and with $7 million already having been spent. While a majority of the film was shot at Pinewood, some scenes were shot at Blyth Power Station and the beach near Dawdon (known locally as "the Blast" or "Blast Beach") in the UK. The purpose of these shots was to show the exterior of the planet. Cinematographer Jordan Cronenweth, in deteriorating health following a diagnosis of Parkinsons Disease a decade earlier worked only for two weeks before becoming too ill to continue. He was replaced by Alex Thomson. Actor Charles Dance said that an alternative ending had been filmed due to fears that the original ending was too similar to the ending of Terminator 2: Judgment Day, released the previous year, but was not used.

=== Visual effects ===
Stan Winston, responsible for creature effects in Aliens, was approached but was not available. Winston instead recommended Tom Woodruff Jr. and Alec Gillis, two former workers of his studio who had just started their own company, Amalgamated Dynamics. Even before principal photography had begun, the practical effects crew was developing models of the Alien and the corpses of the Sulaco victims. Richard Edlund's Boss Film Studios was hired for compositing and other post-production effects. A small number of shots contain computer-generated imagery, most notably the cracking alien head once the sprinklers cause thermal shock. Other CGI elements include shadows cast by the rod puppet alien, and airborne debris in outdoor scenes.

David Fincher wanted the alien to be "more of a puma, or a beast" as opposed to the upright, humanoid posture of the previous films, so the designer of the original alien, H. R. Giger, was contacted to generate new sketch ideas. His revisions included longer, thinner legs, the removal of "pipes" around the spine, and an idea for a sharp alien "tongue" in place of the secondary jaws. Working from his studio in Zurich, Giger produced these new sketches, which he faxed to Cornelius de Fries, who then created their model counterparts out of plasticine. The only one of Giger's designs that wound up in the final project was a "Bambi Burster" Alien that had long legs and walked on all fours. ADI also built a full-scale Bunraku-style puppet of this design which was operated on-set as an in-camera effect. Scenes using this approach were cut from the final release due to the limitations of chemical compositing techniques, making it exceedingly difficult to remove the puppeteers from the background plate, but can be seen in the "Assembly Cut" of the film.

The Alien is portrayed by both Woodruff Jr. in a suit and a rod puppet filmed against bluescreen and optically composited into the live-action footage, with the rods removed by rotoscoping. A mechanical alien head was also used for close-ups. The suit adapted the design used in Aliens so Woodruff could walk on all fours. Woodruff's head was contained in the neck of the suit, because the head was filled with animatronics to move the mouth of the Alien. Fincher suggested that a Whippet be dressed in an alien costume for on-set coverage of the quadrupedal alien, but the visual effects team was dissatisfied with the comical result and the idea was dropped in favor of the puppet.

The rod-puppet approach was chosen for the production rather than stop-motion animation, which did not provide the required smoothness to appear realistic. As a result, the rod-puppet allowed for a fast alien that could move across surfaces of any orientation and be shot from any angle. This was particularly effective as it was able to accomplish movements not feasible by an actor in a suit. The 1/3-scale puppet was 40 inches long and cast in foam rubber over a bicycle chain armature for flexibility. For moving camera shots, the on-set cameras were equipped with digital recorders to track, pan, tilt, and dolly values. The data output was then taken back to the studio and fed into the motion control cameras with the linear dimensions scaled down to match the puppet.

To make syncing the puppet's actions with the live-action shots easier, the effects team developed an instant compositing system using LaserDisc. This allowed takes to be quickly overlaid on the background plate so the crew could observe whether any spatial adjustments were required.

Laine Liska was hired to lead a team of puppeteers in a new process dubbed "Mo-Motion" where the rod puppet would be simultaneously manipulated and filmed with a moving motion control camera. Depending on the complexity of the shot, the puppet was operated by 4–6 people. Sparse sets were created to provide freedom of motion for the puppeteers as well as large, solid surfaces for the puppet to act within a three dimensional space.

The crew was pushed to make the movements of the Alien as quick as possible to the point where they were barely in control, and this led to, according to Edlund, "the occasional serendipitous action that made the alien have a character". The ease of this setup allowed the crew to film 60–70 takes of a single scene.

Hoping to give the destroyed Bishop a more complex look that could not be accomplished by simple make-up, the final product was done entirely through animatronics, while a playback of Lance Henriksen's voice played to guide Sigourney Weaver.

Scenes of the Emergency Escape Vehicle were shot with a 3.5-foot miniature against a blue-screen and composited onto large scale traditional matte paintings of the planet's surface. To make the clouds glow from within as the EEV entered the atmosphere, the painting's values were digitally reversed and animated frame by frame. The scene in which the EEV is moved by a crane-arm (also a miniature) was created by projecting a video of actors onto pieces of cardboard and then compositing them into the scene as silhouettes against the matte-painted background.

== Music ==
The film's composer, Elliot Goldenthal, spent a year composing the score by working closely with Fincher to create music based primarily on the surroundings and atmosphere of the film itself. The score was recorded during the 1992 Los Angeles riots, which Goldenthal later claimed contributed to the score's disturbing nature.

== Release ==
=== Home media ===
Alien 3 has been released in various home video formats and packages over the years. The first of these were on VHS and LaserDisc, and several subsequent VHS releases were sold both singly and as boxed sets throughout the 1990s. A VHS boxed set titled The Alien Trilogy containing Alien 3 along with Alien and Aliens was released in facehugger-shaped carrying cases, and included some of the deleted scenes from the LaserDisc editions. In 1997, Alien 3 would premiere on a THX certified widescreen VHS release, along with its predecessors. When Alien Resurrection premiered in theaters that year, another boxed set of the first three films was released titled The Alien Saga, which included a Making of Alien Resurrection tape. A few months later, this set was re-released with the Alien Resurrection film taking the place of the making-of video. In 1999, Alien 3 was released on DVD, both singly and packaged with the other three Alien films as The Alien Legacy boxed set. This set was also released in a VHS version and would be the last VHS release of the film. In 2003, Alien 3 would be included in the 9-disc Alien Quadrilogy DVD set which contained two versions of the film (see below). The first three films were also later packaged as the Alien Triple Pack DVD set (this release was identical to the 1999 Alien Legacy set but excluding Alien Resurrection). Alien 3 was first released on Blu-ray in 2010, as part of the 6-disc Alien Anthology boxed set which included all of the features from the Alien Quadrilogy DVD set and more. The film was also released as a single Blu-ray Disc in 2011. Fincher was the only director from the franchise who declined to participate in the box-set releases.

The bonus disc for Alien 3 in the 2003 Quadrilogy set includes a documentary of the film's production that lacks Fincher's participation, as clips where the director openly expresses anger and frustration with the studio were cut. The documentary was originally named Wreckage and Rape after one of the tracks of Goldenthal's soundtrack, but Fox renamed it simply The Making of Alien 3. These clips were restored for the 2010 Blu-ray release of the Anthology set, with the integral documentary having a slightly altered version of the intended name, Wreckage and Rage.

=== Assembly cut ===
When Fox wanted to assemble a director's cut of Alien 3 for a home-video release, Fincher refused to participate. Instead, an extended cut called the "Assembly Cut" was created based on his editing room notes and released on the 2003 Alien Quadrilogy DVD box set, overseen by producer Charles de Lauzirika. This version of the film runs 144 minutes, and includes over 30 minutes of extended, alternate, and previously deleted scenes, as well as alternative key plot elements. One example of the plot differences is that in the theatrical version, the Alien bursts out of a dog, while in the Assembly Cut the Alien bursts out of a dead ox. Another example is that in the theatrical version, Ripley and the inmates fail to trap the Alien in the toxic waste room, while in the Assembly Cut they actually succeed. Golic, the crazed prisoner who becomes fascinated with the Alien, then escapes from the infirmary, kills the prisoner standing guard, and lets the Alien loose at the expense of his own life. This fills what is arguably the most obvious plot hole in the theatrical cut, as in that version he simply disappears from the film entirely after Clemens's death in the infirmary. In addition to Golic, more of the minor characters' fates are revealed, filling more plot holes.

Unlike the 2003 DVD release, in the 2010 Blu-ray version the additional footage went through post-production, receiving color correction and sound mixing to match the rest of the film, which included bringing back some cast members to re-record dialogue.

== Reception ==
=== Box office ===
Alien 3 was released in the United States on May 22, 1992. The film debuted at number two of the box office, behind Lethal Weapon 3, with a Memorial Day weekend gross of $23.1 million. It screened in 2,227 theaters, for an average gross of $8,733 per theater. The film was considered a disappointment in the United States and Canada with a total of $55.5 million, although, according to Box Office Mojo, it grossed $104.3 million internationally for a total of $159.8 million. It outgrossed the original theatrical run of Alien, and had the 28th-highest domestic gross in 1992. In October 1992, Fox claimed it was the highest-grossing of the franchise, with a worldwide gross of $175 million. By the end of 1992, Variety reported its worldwide gross at $180 million.

=== Critical response ===
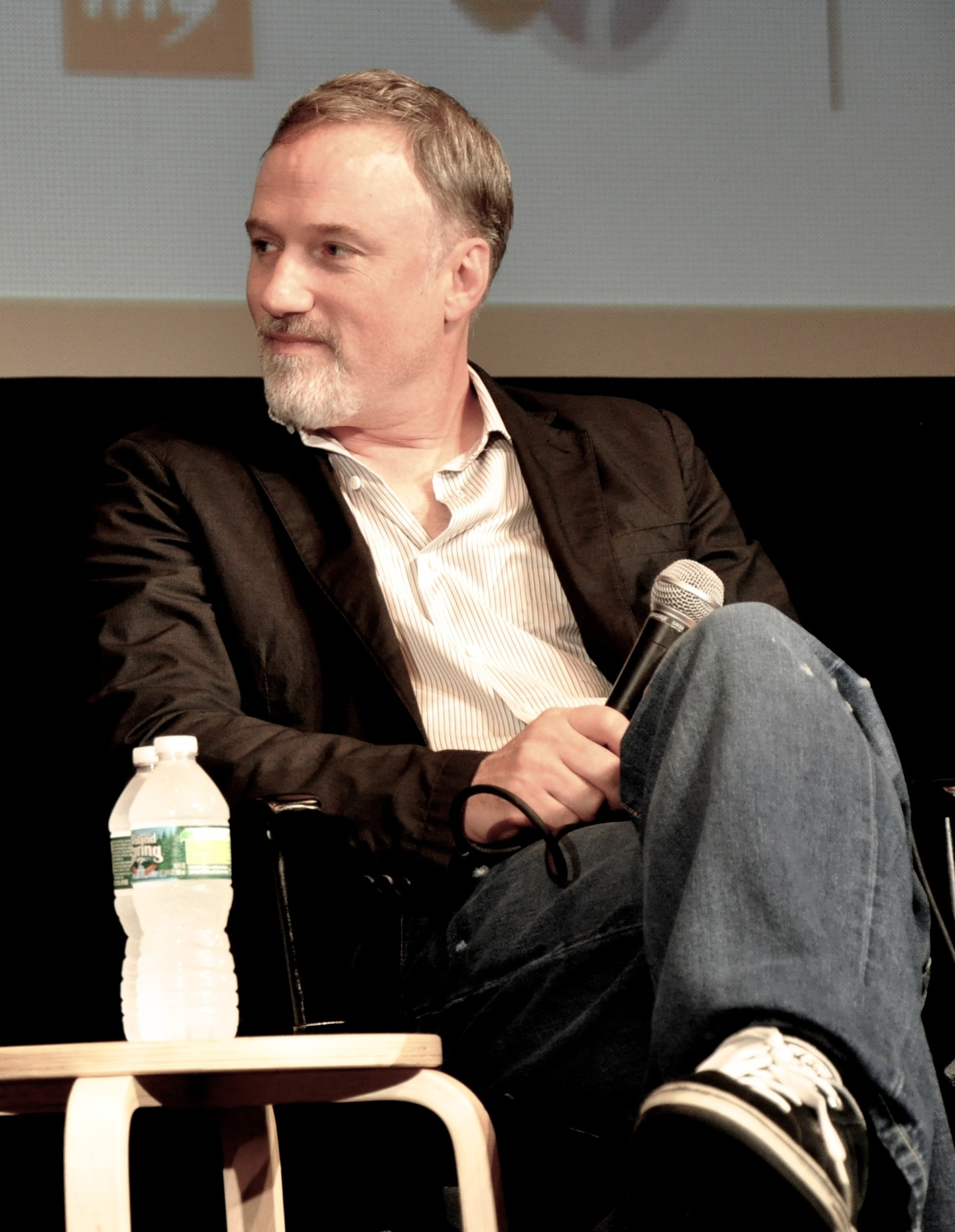
In 2009, director David Fincher (pictured here in 2010) disowned the film, saying, "No one hated it more than me; to this day, no one hates it more than me."

Review aggregation website Rotten Tomatoes gives Alien 3 an approval rating of 43% from 127 reviews, with an average rating of 5.7/10. The website's critical consensus reads, "Alien3 takes admirable risks with franchise mythology, but far too few pay off in a thinly scripted sequel whose stylish visuals aren't enough to enliven a lack of genuine thrills." Metacritic assigned a weighted average score of 59 out of 100 based on 20 critics, signifying "mixed or average" reviews. Audiences polled by CinemaScore gave the film an average grade of "C" on an A+ to F scale. As of 2026, it is the lowest-rated film of the main Alien franchise on all three websites.

Gene Siskel and Roger Ebert gave the film two thumbs down on their show At The Movies, feeling it was repetitious. They criticized the drawn-out chase scenes near the end as well as the lack of suspenseful action, though they praised the art direction and Weaver's performance, with Ebert calling it "probably the best-looking bad movie I've seen in a while". In his review of Alien Resurrection, Ebert later wrote "I lost interest [in Alien 3], when I realized that the aliens could at all times outrun and outleap the humans, so all the chase scenes were contrivances."

A number of cast and crew associated with the series, including actor Michael Biehn, director James Cameron, and novelist Alan Dean Foster, expressed their frustration and disappointment with the film's story. Cameron regarded the decision to kill off the characters of Bishop, Newt, and Hicks as a "slap in the face" to him and to fans of the previous film. He eventually blamed 20th Century Fox for the film, saying that Fincher got handed "a big mess on a plate". Upon learning of the original plans during the production for his character to be killed off by using a life-sized dummy based on his likeness from which an alien would have emerged, Biehn, who had not been asked for the permission to have his likeness used, demanded and received almost as much money for the use of an archival picture of him in the EEV crash report sequence which was filmed but appears only in the Assembly Cut as he had been paid for his entire role in Aliens.

Fincher has since disowned the film. He told The Guardian in 2009, "No one hated it more than me; to this day, no one hates it more than me." He also blamed the producers for not putting trust in him. While Weaver has stood by the final film and expressed that she "loved working with" Fincher, she heavily criticized the treatment of him by 20th Century Fox, stating: "That was a transition moment when studios stopped being about 'let's make great films' and started being about 'let's not lose money.' They had the great idea to put David Fincher aboard for his first film, but then not to support the guy was very idiotic." Charles Dance also stood by the film, considering it better than its predecessor, and also praised Fincher's direction: "I remember walking on this huge set at Pinewood Studios and Fincher comes up and fires off his shot list for the day. Here's this guy young enough to be my son who knew all the crew's jobs, all the shots he wanted, and where he was going to make the cuts in the film, and I thought, 'My God, this guy is going to go far.'"

Several critics have regarded the Assembly Cut as superior to the theatrical release. Journalist Nick Schager called it a "fascinating, often fantastic" film, its additional scenes a "disdainful critique of religion". Critic Tim Brayton remarked it "feels much fleeter and more driven even though it's a solid 30 minutes longer".

Christopher Nolan has expressed his fondness for the movie, saying that while he understood Fincher's frustration at the many changes that occurred during production, he ultimately thought it was a "great movie" and Fincher's work was "remarkable."

=== Accolades ===
Award	Category	Recipients	Result	Ref.
Academy Awards	Best Visual Effects	Richard Edlund, Alec Gillis, Tom Woodruff Jr., and George Gibbs	Nominated	
British Academy Film Awards	Best Special Effects	Richard Edlund, Alec Gillis, Tom Woodruff Jr., and George Gibbs	Nominated	
Fangoria Chainsaw Awards	Best Studio/Big-Budget Film	Alien 3	Nominated	
Fangoria Chainsaw Awards	Best Actress	Sigourney Weaver	Nominated	
Fangoria Chainsaw Awards	Best Supporting Actor	Charles S. Dutton	Nominated	
Hugo Awards	Best Dramatic Presentation	Alien 3	Nominated	
Golden Reel Awards	Best Sound Editing	Alien 3	Won	
MTV Movie Awards	Best Action Sequence	Aliens chase through a tunnel	Won	
Saturn Awards	Best Science Fiction Film	Alien 3	Nominated	
Saturn Awards	Best Actress	Sigourney Weaver	Nominated	
Saturn Awards	Best Supporting Actor	Charles S. Dutton	Nominated	
Saturn Awards	Best Director	David Fincher	Nominated	
Saturn Awards	Best Writing	David Giler, Walter Hill, and Larry Ferguson	Nominated	
Saturn Awards	Best Costume	Rob Ringwood and David Perry	Nominated	
Saturn Awards	Best Special Effects	Richard Edlund, Alec Gillis, Tom Woodruff Jr., and George Gibbs	Nominated	

The film's visual effects were nominated for an Academy Award, losing to Death Becomes Her, and for a BAFTA Award for Best Special Visual Effects. The film was also nominated for seven Saturn Awards, a Hugo Award and won a MTV Movie Award for Best Action Sequence.

== Other media ==
=== Novelization ===
A novelization of the film was authored by Alan Dean Foster, writer of the novelizations of Alien and Aliens. Foster's adaptation includes many scenes that were cut from the final film, some of which later reappeared in the "Assembly Cut". Foster wanted his adaptation to differ from the film's script, which he disliked, but Walter Hill declared he should not alter the storyline. Foster later commented: "So out went my carefully constructed motivations for all the principal prisoners, my preserving the life of Newt (her killing in the film is an obscenity), and much else. Embittered by this experience, that's why I turned down Alien Resurrection."

=== Comic books ===
Dark Horse Comics also released a three-issue mini series. Created by writer Steven Grant and artist Christopher Taylor, the comic was a faithful adaption, with only a few deviations. One such deviation is that Ripley and the convicts succeed in capturing the Xenomorph in the waste-tank, only for a deranged prisoner named Golic to release it afterward. Later, when they believe they have destroyed the Alien, Ripley begs Dillon to kill her, but he can't bring himself to do it. The Xenomorph suddenly appears, and tosses Dillon into the smelting furnace.

=== Video games ===
A video game of the same name was developed by Probe Entertainment, and released for multiple formats by Acclaim, LJN and Virgin Games, including Amiga, Commodore 64, Nintendo Entertainment System, Super NES, Mega Drive/Genesis and Master System. Rather than being a faithful adaptation of the film, it took the form of a basic platform action game where the player controlled Ripley using the weapons from the film Aliens in a green-dark ambient environment. The Game Boy version, developed by Bits Studios, was different from the console game, being a top-down adventure game. Sega also developed an arcade rail shooter loosely based on the film's events, Alien 3: The Gun, which was released in 1993.

=== Television ===
An animated series titled Operation: Aliens was conceived by Kenner Toys and Fox to coincide with the release of Alien 3 but was ultimately abandoned. Animation on the series was to be carried out by the Korean animation studio AKOM, but the series was scrapped for fears it would run afoul of the Children's Television Act and because Fox, intending to produce further Alien films, was concerned an animated series for children would dilute the franchise's appeal to the older demographic.

=== William Gibson's Alien 3 ===
In 2018–19, Dark Horse released William Gibson's Alien 3, a five-part comic adaptation of Gibson's unproduced version of the screenplay, illustrated and adapted by Johnnie Christmas, colored by Tamra Bonvillain.

As part of Alien's 40th anniversary, on May 30, 2019, Audible released an audio drama of Gibson's script, adapted by Dirk Maggs, and with Michael Biehn and Lance Henriksen reprising their roles. The production had music by James Hannigan.

In 2021, Pat Cadigan published Alien^{3}: The Unproduced First-draft Screenplay by William Gibson (Titan Books). This novel is based on Gibson's first draft, as opposed to the second draft used for the comic and audio drama adaptations. The novel won the Scribe Award for Best Adapted Novel.

== Sequel ==
A sequel, Alien Resurrection, was released in 1997.

== See also ==
- List of films featuring extraterrestrials
- List of monster movies
