= Thing =

Thing or The Thing may refer to:

== Philosophy ==
- An object
- Thing-in-itself (or noumenon), the reality that underlies perceptions, a term coined by Immanuel Kant
- The thing in thing theory, a branch of critical theory that focuses on human–object interactions in literature and culture

== Arts, media and entertainment ==
- The Thing (franchise), a multimedia franchise based on the novella Who Goes There?
  - The Thing from Another World, often referred to as The Thing, 1951 science fiction film based on the novella
  - The Thing (1982 film), a remake of the 1951 film, more closely following the original novella
  - The Thing (2011 film), a prequel to the 1982 film
  - The Thing (video game), a 2002 video game sequel to the 1982 film
  - Thing (The Thing), the antagonist of the franchise

=== Film and television ===
- Thing (The Addams Family), a television series character that resembles a hand
- "The Thing", a season 4 episode of SpongeBob SquarePants
- An alias for Mothra, used in Godzilla vs. the Thing
- Fred and Barney Meet the Thing, an animated series featuring the Marvel Comics character

=== Literature ===
- The Thing: Why I am a Catholic, a 1929 book by G. K. Chesterton
- Thing!, a 2001 picture book in the Kipper the Dog series by Mick Inkpen

=== Comics ===
- Thing (Marvel Comics), a superhero in the Marvel Universe and member of the Fantastic Four
- The Thing!, a 1950s comic book series from Charlton Comics

=== Music ===
- The Thing (band), a Norwegian/Swedish jazz trio formed in 2000
  - The Thing (The Thing album), 2000
- The Thing (Jazz Crusaders album), 1965, or the title song
- The Thing (1982 soundtrack), a 1982 soundtrack for the film of the same name
- The Thing (2011 soundtrack), a 2011 soundtrack for the film of the same name

==== Songs ====
- "The Thing" (song), a 1950 song, recorded by Phil Harris and others
- "The Thing", a B-side song on the single release of "Velouria" by Pixies

== Other uses ==
- Thing (assembly), also spelled as ting or þing, a historical Germanic governing assembly
- Thing, term for entities in the Doom engine
- The Thing (art project), a 1990s community-based in New York City
- The Thing (listening device), a Soviet bug used during the Cold War for eavesdropping on the U.S. ambassador to the Soviet Union
- The Thing (roadside attraction), an attraction in the U.S. state of Arizona
- Volkswagen 181, an automobile, known as the "Thing" in the U.S. and sold there 1973–1974

== See also ==
- Fing, a book by children's author David Walliams
- Our Thing (disambiguation)
- Thang (disambiguation)
- Things (disambiguation)
- The Things (disambiguation)
