= The Things =

Things or The Things may refer to:

== Music ==
- Things (album), by Uri Caine and Paolo Fresu, 2006
- "Things" (Bobby Darin song), 1962; covered by Ronnie Dove, 1975
- "Things", a song by Joe Walsh from There Goes the Neighborhood, 1981
- "Things", a song by John Cale from HoboSapiens, 2003
- "Things", a song by Split Enz, 1979
- "Things", a song by Paul Westerberg from 14 Songs, 1993
- "The Things", a song by Audio Bullys from Ego War, 2003

== Literature ==
- Things, a 1914 novel by Alice Duer Miller
- Things: A Story of the Sixties (French: Les Choses: Une histoire des années soixante), a 1965 novel by Georges Perec
- "Things", a 1970 short story by Ursula K. Le Guin, originally published as "The End" in the 1970 anthology Orbit 6, edited by Damon Knight
- Things, a 1981 picture book by Roger Hargreaves
- The Things, a 1994 novel by Martyn Godfrey
- Things, a 1997 novel by Rodman Philbrick and Lynn Harnett, the second installment in the Visitors trilogy
- "The Things" (short story), a 2010 short story by Peter Watts

== Other uses ==
- TheThings, a news website
- Things (Chill), a 1984 role-playing game supplement
- Things (film), a 1989 Canadian horror film
- Things (software), task management software
- The Things, recurring characters in the British adult humour comic Viz
- The Things, Thing One and Thing Two, from the 1957 children's book The Cat in the Hat by Dr. Seuss
- T.H.I.N.G.S., a line of games marketed by the Milton Bradley Company

== See also ==
- Our Thing (disambiguation)
- Thang (disambiguation)
- Thing (disambiguation)
- Thring (disambiguation)
- Thwing (disambiguation)
