= Evolva =

2000 video game

- European cover art
- Developer: Computer Artworks
- Publishers: NA: Interplay Entertainment; EU: Virgin Interactive
- Director: William Latham
- Producer: Vince Farquharson
- Designers: Mark Atkinson; Vince Farquharson
- Programmers: Rik Heywood; Mark Atkinson
- Artist: Karl Wickens
- Composer: Keith Tinman
- Platform: Windows
- Release: EU: May 12, 2000; NA: May 25, 2000
- Genre: Action
- Modes: Single-player, multiplayer

Evolva is a third-person action game created by British computer artist William Latham and game designer/programmer Mark Atkinson, and released in 2000.

== Gameplay ==
The player leads a team of four "GenoHunters" exploring a planet; each of the GenoHunters can develop new abilities by incorporating and altering the DNA they've absorbed from the creatures they have killed. The GenoHunters change their physical appearance (change colors, develop spikes or horns) based on the DNA they've used to mutate themselves. Genohunters can punch, jump, super jump, breathe fire, vomit flammable liquids, shoot explosives, scramble enemies' brains, and spawn small alien offspring that injure enemies. Prior to the game's release, publisher Interplay Entertainment advertised that there are over one billion possible variations on the basic Genohunter.

The game has 12 large, linear levels populated with alien insect-like creatures known as the "parasite guardians". There are different types of these alien creatures. In some of the levels there are "Bosses" at the end which your team of GenoHunters must defeat.

== Reception ==
Reception

Aggregate score
Aggregator	Score
GameRankings	75%

Review scores
Publication	Score
CNET Gamecenter	6/10
Computer Games Strategy Plus	3.5/5
Computer Gaming World	4/5
Edge	6/10
EP Daily	7/10
Eurogamer	9/10
Game Informer	5.75/10
GameFan	97%
GameRevolution	B+
GameSpot	7.3/10
GameSpy	78%
IGN	7.2/10
Next Generation	3/5
PC Gamer (US)	79%

The game received favorable reviews according to the review aggregation website GameRankings. The game was praised by critics as very innovative, without any major criticisms, other than the high hardware requirements (for the time) and weak multiplayer support. Jim Preston of NextGen said of the game, "The gorgeous graphics and beautiful sound conceal some rather ordinary, if mostly fun, gameplay."

Nick Woods of AllGame gave it a score of four stars out of five, saying, "A strong point of Evolva is the quality of the environments created by Interplay. The sense that you're on another planet is apparent and adds to the enjoyment of the game. I'd recommend this game to just about anyone as, overall, Evolva is a good, solid game that will provide many hours of enjoyment." Michael Lafferty of GameZone gave it 8.5/10, calling it "a well-designed action-adventure game that demands intellect and reflexive skill." Barry Brenesal of GamePro said, "Evolva has its distinctive elements-good team AI and great pathing, a wonderful variety of exotic creatures, and a novel application of color over a 3D terrain. But much of the game is simply traditional shooter material with an alien overlay. I kept hoping for something more creative, given the 3D possibilities-perhaps abilities that included flight. Evolva doesn't disappoint, but it doesn't raise much enthusiasm, either." (Note: GamePro gave the game 3.5/5 for graphics, 2/5 for sound, 4/5 for control, and 3/5 for fun factor.)

Based upon Evolva, Universal Interactive invited Computer Artworks to make a pitch for The Thing, a game based on the 1982 film of the same name. For the pitch, Computer Artworks reskinned a level from Evolva with an Antarctic theme and a Thing-like creature as a boss fight. The pitch impressed Universal sufficiently, and the deal was signed.
