= The Thing (2011 film) =

Film by Matthijs van Heijningen Jr.

- Theatrical release poster
- Directed by: Matthijs van Heijningen Jr.
- Written by: Eric Heisserer
- Based on: Who Goes There? by John W. Campbell
- Produced by: Marc Abraham; Eric Newman
- Starring: Mary Elizabeth Winstead; Joel Edgerton; Adewale Akinnuoye-Agbaje; Ulrich Thomsen; Eric Christian Olsen; Trond Espen Seim
- Cinematography: Michel Abramowicz
- Edited by: Julian Clarke; Peter Boyle
- Music by: Marco Beltrami
- Production companies: Universal Pictures; Morgan Creek Productions; Strike Entertainment
- Distributed by: Universal Pictures
- Release dates: October 10, 2011 (Universal City); October 14, 2011 (United States)
- Running time: 103 minutes
- Countries: United States; Canada
- Languages: English; Norwegian
- Budget: $38 million
- Box office: $31.5 million

The Thing is a 2011 science fiction horror film serving as a direct prequel to John Carpenter's 1982 film, which was an adaptation of the 1938 novella Who Goes There? by John W. Campbell. Directed by Matthijs van Heijningen Jr. and written by Eric Heisserer, it stars an ensemble cast led by Mary Elizabeth Winstead, Joel Edgerton, Ulrich Thomsen, Adewale Akinnuoye-Agbaje, and Eric Christian Olsen. The film is an international co-production between the United States and Canada. It tells the story of the Norwegian team of scientists at a Norwegian Antarctic research station who discover a parasitic alien buried deep in the ice, realizing too late that it is still alive.

The Thing premiered on October 10, 2011, and was released on October 14, 2011. The film was a box-office bomb, grossing only $31.5 million worldwide on a budget of $38 million, and received mixed reviews from critics.

== Plot ==
In the winter of 1982, members of the Norwegian research station "Thule" discover an alien spacecraft and a nearby alien body buried in the Antarctic ice. Dr. Sander Halvorson and his assistant Adam Finch recruit American paleontologist Kate Lloyd to investigate. Together with pilots Sam Carter, Derek Jameson, and crewman Griggs, they fly to Thule Station and meet station chief Edvard Wolner, along with his team of Juliette, Karl, Jonas, Olav, Henrik, Colin, Peder, Lars, and Lars' dog.

The body, encased in a block of ice, is transported to Thule Station. While the team celebrates their historic find, Jameson witnesses the Thing burst from the ice block. The team splits up to search for the alien and find Lars' dog dead. The alien drags Henrik into itself, spattering blood on Olav. The group kills the alien by igniting spilled fuel beneath it. An autopsy reveals that the alien's cells were copying Henrik's. Olav falls ill.

As Carter, Jameson, and Griggs are taking off in the helicopter to take Olav to a medical facility, Griggs transforms into a Thing and attacks Olav, causing the helicopter to crash in the mountains. Kate discovers dental fillings in a bloodied shower and alerts the team that the alien can assimilate and imitate its victims to hide among them. Edvard orders the team to drive to the closest base; however, Juliette and Kate want to prevent anyone from leaving. After going with Kate to get the keys to the vehicles, Juliette transforms and attempts to kill her. Kate escapes and the Juliette-Thing kills Karl. Lars kills the Juliette-Thing with a flamethrower and the team resolves to quarantine themselves until the threat is eliminated.

That night, Carter and Jameson stagger back from the crash. Suspected of being infected, they are kept in isolation. As the alien does not assimilate and imitate inorganic material (as Kate realized from the discarded dental fillings), Kate proposes everyone to be checked for dental fillings. The test clears all but Sander, Edvard, Adam, and Colin, as they have no metallic fillings.

Lars is abducted while going to fetch Carter and Jameson for testing. Carter and Jameson break into the main building, shooting Peder dead and puncturing his flamethrower tank, causing an explosion that knocks Edvard unconscious. When brought to the main room, Edvard violently transforms into the Thing, infects Jonas, kills Jameson, then assimilates Adam, becoming a two-headed thing. Kate burns Jonas and Jameson before they can fully transform, then she and Carter burn the Edvard/Adams-Thing before pursuing Sander, who had also been assimilated.

The Sander-Thing drives in a snowcat to the spaceship. The spacecraft suddenly activates, shifting and separating Kate and Carter, with Kate falling into the ship and Carter proceeding through the main hatch. Kate encounters the monstrous Sander-Thing and kills it with a grenade, which shuts down the ship's engines. Kate finds Carter and notices that he is missing his earring; Carter reaches for the wrong ear, confirming to her that he is the Thing in disguise. Kate burns the Carter-Thing, preventing its escape. Kate enters a second snowcat and prepares to drive to the Soviet base 50 miles away.

The next morning, Thule's helicopter and pilot Matias returns to the ruined station. Matias finds the burned remains of the two-headed Adams-Thing. Colin's corpse sits in the radio comms room, his wrists slit and a straight razor held in his hand. Lars, having been hiding in the building where Jameson and Carter attacked him, demands at gunpoint that Matias show his teeth. Lars' dog, thought dead, emerges and runs away. Realizing that the dog is a Thing, Lars orders Matias to give chase in the helicopter. (Note: As depicted in The Thing (1982))

== Cast ==
- Mary Elizabeth Winstead as Kate Lloyd, an American vertebrate paleontologist graduate from Columbia University: In order to be different from Kurt Russell as the 1982 film's protagonist, R.J. MacReady, Kate Lloyd was written to have similar traits to the character Ellen Ripley from the Alien film series.
- Joel Edgerton as Sam Carter, an American helicopter pilot and Vietnam War veteran running a supply operation to the bases. He and his two co-pilots are left in the dark as to why they are there and what is the mysterious thing the scientists have found.
- Ulrich Thomsen as Dr. Sander Halvorson, the arrogant Danish leader of alien research. He orders the team to obtain a sample of the recently discovered creature despite Kate's warnings. Norwegian actor Dennis Storhøi was initially hired to play the role, but was replaced by Thomsen after a week of filming. This required some digital effects work in post, as Thomsen's face was put on Storhoi's body for scenes that had already been shot with the other actor.
- Eric Christian Olsen as Adam Finch, a young Canadian scientist working as Dr. Sander's research assistant who invites Kate to the Norwegian base.
- Adewale Akinnuoye-Agbaje as Derek Jameson, an American helicopter co-pilot and also a Vietnam veteran who is Carter's best friend.
- Paul Braunstein as Griggs, a crew-chief member of the American helicopter transport team.
- Trond Espen Seim as Edvard Wolner, a notable Norwegian geologist who is the station commander and an old friend of Sander.
- Kim Bubbs as Juliette, a French geologist who is part of Edvard's team.
- Jørgen Langhelle as Lars, an ex-soldier who works as the dog keeper of the Norwegian base. He is the only member of the Norwegian base who does not speak English. Lars is also revealed to be the Norwegian shooter in the original film.
- Kristofer Hivju as Jonas, a nervous but friendly Norwegian polar ice researcher.
- Jan Gunnar Røise as Olav, a Norwegian Snowcat vehicle driver and guide.
- Stig Henrik Hoff as Peder, a Norwegian rifle-toting camp member who is Edvard's right-hand man.
- Jo Adrian Haavind as Henrik, another Norwegian base member who assists the alien research team.
- Carsten Bjørnlund as Karl, a Norwegian geologist also part of Edvard's team.
- Jonathan Lloyd Walker as Colin, an eccentric English radio operator.
- Ole Martin Aune Nilsen as Matias, the helicopter pilot of the Norwegian base currently in a mission to restock kerosene at Halley. Matias, like Lars, is revealed to be aboard the Norwegian helicopter in the 1982 film.

== Production ==
=== Development ===
"It's a really fascinating way to construct a story because we're doing it by autopsy, by examining very, very closely everything we know about the Norwegian camp and about the events that happened there from photos and video footage that's recovered, from a visit to the base, the director, producer and I have gone through it countless times marking, you know, there's a fire axe in the door, we have to account for that... we're having to reverse engineer it, so those details all matter to us 'cause it all has to make sense."
— Eric Heisserer describing the process of creating a script that is consistent with the first film.

After creating the Dawn of the Dead remake, producers Marc Abraham and Eric Newman began to look through the Universal Studios library to find new properties to work on. Upon finding John Carpenter's 1982 film The Thing, the two convinced Universal to create a prequel instead of a remake, as they felt that remaking Carpenter's film would be like "paint(ing) a moustache on the Mona Lisa". Eric Newman explained; "I'd be the first to say no one should ever try to do Jaws again and I certainly wouldn't want to see anyone remake The Exorcist... And we really felt the same way about The Thing. It's a great film. But once we realized there was a new story to tell, with the same characters and the same world, but from a very different point of view, we took it as a challenge. It's the story about the guys who are just ghosts in Carpenter's movie – they're already dead. But having Universal give us a chance to tell their story was irresistible."

In early 2009, Variety reported the launch of a project to film a prequel—possibly following MacReady's brother during the events leading up to the opening moments of the 1982 film—with Matthijs van Heijningen Jr. as director and Ronald D. Moore as writer. Matthijs van Heijningen Jr. became involved in the project when his first planned feature film, a sequel to the Dawn of the Dead remake, a zombie film taking place in Las Vegas written and produced by Zack Snyder, who directed the Dawn of the Dead remake, and co-produced by Abraham and Newman, called Army of the Dead, was cancelled by the studio three months before production began. Needing to start all over again, he asked his agent to see if there was a The Thing project in development, since Alien and The Thing are his favorite films. As a fan of Carpenter's film, he was interested in the project because, being European himself, he had always wondered what happened at the Norwegian camp. In March 2009, Moore described his script as a "companion piece" to Carpenter's film and "not a remake." "We're telling the story of the Norwegian camp that found the Thing before the Kurt Russell group did", he said.

Eric Heisserer was later hired to do a complete rewrite of Moore's script. While in Moore's original draft it was clear who would be the Thing, in rewrites it was decided the audience should not know who is infected in order to add to the sense of paranoia. Heisserer explained that in rewriting the script, it was necessary for him to research all the information that was revealed about the Norwegian camp from the first film, down to the smallest details, so that it could be incorporated into the prequel in order to create a consistent backstory. Heisserer also expressed part of the difficulty in writing the script was creating characters that were smart scientists, who, without copying what was done by characters in the first film, would come up with a test to determine who the thing is, yet still ultimately be outsmarted by the creature. The decision was made to name the film the same title as the first film, because the producers felt adding a "colon title" such as Exorcist II: The Heretic would be less reverential. In April 2010, it was revealed that Scott Frank had been hired to work uncredited on new dialogue for the film.

Matthijs van Heijningen Jr. explained that he created the film not to simply be a horror film, but to also focus largely on the human drama with the interaction between characters, as the first film had. The director felt that horror films worked better when time was spent to explore the characters' emotional journeys, allowing the audience to care about them. Mary Elizabeth Winstead insisted that the film would not feature any romantic or sexual elements with her character, as it would be inappropriate considering the tone of the film. Adewale Akinnuoye-Agbaje said that the film would try to recreate the feeling of paranoia and distrust that the first film had, where the characters can't tell who has been infected by the alien. The filmmakers drew additional inspiration for the film from the original novel Who Goes There?, in making the characters in the film educated scientists as opposed to "blue collar" workers. However, the filmmakers drew no influence from the events of The Thing video game. The director also drew additional inspiration from the film Alien in creating the film, particularly in regard to casting a female lead, and in the way the alien creatures are filmed by not showing too much of them.

Matthijs van Heijningen also cited the films of director Roman Polanski as influence, such as his work on Rosemary's Baby. Actual Norwegian and Danish actors were cast in the film to play the Norwegian characters, and the director allowed the actors to improvise elements different from what was scripted when they felt it was appropriate, such as a scene where the characters sing a Norwegian folk song called "Sámiid ædnan". Many scenes involving characters speaking Norwegian were subtitled, and the language barrier between them and the English speaking characters is exploited to add to the film's feeling of paranoia. Director Matthijs van Heijningen said that the film would show the alien creature in its "pure form", as it was discovered in its ship by the Norwegians; however, it is not revealed whether this is the creature's original form or the form of another creature it had assimilated. Addressing rumors stating that John Carpenter wished to have a cameo appearance in the film, Carpenter himself corrected these in an interview for the fan site "Outpost 31", in August 2012. "[Those] rumors are not true", Carpenter stated in the interview.

=== Filming and visual effects ===
The film was shot in the anamorphic format on 35mm film, as the director dislikes the look of films shot digitally. The director chose not to fast cut the film, instead opting for a slower pace, hoping to build a sense of dread. The prequel was filmed in Pinewood Toronto Studios, Port Lands on March 22, 2010, and ended on June 28, 2010. On set, the director had a laptop computer which contained "a million" screen captures of the Carpenter film, which he used as a point of reference to keep the Norwegian camp visually consistent with the first film. Alec Gillis and Tom Woodruff Jr. of Amalgamated Dynamics (ADI) created the practical creature effects for the film. In addition to creating the visual effects for the human-Thing transformations, Gillis, Woodruff and their team had the challenge of coming up with the look of the alien in the ice block unearthed by the Norwegians. While it was initially only intended to be shown as a silhouette, the director liked their designs and encouraged them to fully create the creature, which was realized by creating a creature suit that Tom Woodruff wore. The effects team opted to use cable-operated animatronics over more complex hydraulic controls, as they felt they gave a more "organic feel". To emulate the creature effects of the first film, Heisserer revealed that traditional practical effects would be used on the creatures whenever possible. The puppetry team also included several Canadian puppeteers, including Frank Meschkuleit, Gord Robertson, Rob Mills, Fred Stinson, Mike Petersen, Trish Leeper, Ron Stefaniuk, Karen Valleau, Ronnie Burkett, Matt Ficner, Jason Hopley, and Marty Stelnick, many of whom had worked on TV shows like Fraggle Rock and The Big Comfy Couch. The film's computer-generated imagery (CGI) was created by Image Engine, the visual effects house who worked on Neill Blomkamp's 2009 film District 9.

Computer graphics were used to digitally create extensions on some of the practical animatronic effects, as well as for digital matte paintings and set extensions. Alec Gillis stated that the advancement of animatronic technology since 1982 combined with digital effects allowed the effects team to expand upon the possible creature conceptions. Matthijs van Heijningen preferred to use practical effects over computer imagery, as he believed actors give better performances when they have something physical to react to. Speaking about the practical effects, he stated that acting with physical props "is much better than working with tennis balls [as markers]". Stunt men covered in fire-retardant gel were used in scenes when characters are set on fire. The original Ennio Morricone score was reflected in the film's score, but it was initially reported that Morricone did not score the film, nor was his music from the 1982 version used.

The interior of the crashed alien spacecraft was created by production designer Sean Haworth. To design the ship, Haworth had to recreate what little was shown of the spacecraft in the Carpenter film, then "fill the gaps" for what was not originally shown. Haworth and a team of approximately twelve others then created the inside of the ship as a several story-high interior set constructed mostly out of a combination of foam, plaster, fiberglass, and plywood. The ship was designed specifically to look as if it were not made to accommodate humans, but rather alien creatures of different size and shape who could walk on any surface. A section of the craft called the "pod room" was designed to imply the alien creatures manning it had collected specimens of different alien species from around the universe for a zoological expedition.

=== Studio mandated reshoots ===
While the film was originally set for release in April, Universal Pictures changed the date to October 14, 2011, to allow time for reshoots. An official studio press release stated that the intention of the reshoots was to "enhance existing sequences or to make crystal clear a few story beats or to add punctuation marks to the film's feeling of dread." Universal had test screenings of an early version of the film shown to focus groups, the reaction to which the studio interpreted as negative. In response, many scenes involving character development were either cut from the film, or reshot to be shortened, as the studio disliked the "slow boil" pace of the film. Another concern was that the use of practical effects made the film look too much "like an 80's movie". In response, the decision was made to replace most of the film's practical effects with CGI. In post-release interviews, Alec Gillis revealed that while Amalgamated Dynamics creature designs for the film remained mostly intact, most of their practical effects ended up being digitally replaced in post-production. The creation of Gillis's all-practical-effects independent horror film Harbinger Down was partially in response to this. Writer Eric Heisserer stated the decision, "Broke my heart". Matthijs van Heijningen Jr. has since expressed regret over replacing the film's practical effects with CGI, saying, "I know this is a debated topic, but looking back, we were caught in a cross-zone where animatronics were old-fashioned and the CGI wasn't good enough. We made the wrong decision to do it in post-production [when it came to] making the monster design in the computer. I regret that now."

On his Facebook page, Matthijs van Heijningen Jr. claimed that the reshoots of the film included making an entirely different ending, referring to the original cut as the "pilot version" and the new cut as the "Tetris Version". In the original ending, Kate was to discover the original pilots of the spaceship which had all been killed by The Thing, which was an escaped specimen they had collected from another planet, implying that the ship was crashed in an attempt to kill the monster. "I liked that idea because it would be the Norwegian camp in space. Kate sees the pod room and one pod being broken, giving her the clues what happened. What didn't work was that she wanted to find Sander and stop the ship from taking off and still solve the mystery in the ship. These two energies were in conflict." The original ending had Kate finding the corpse of the alien pilot of the spaceship, discovering that it had accidentally come into contact with the Thing while collecting biological specimens on a zoological expedition, and deliberately killed itself by cutting its own air supply, and crashed its own ship in an attempt to kill the Thing. For the new ending, ADI's practical animatronic alien pilot was replaced by a CGI display of rapidly shifting cubes, and the addition of a CGI "Sander-Thing" was created at "the last minute," the director said, "and it shows, unfortunately."

== Release ==
The film had its premiere in New York City on October 10, 2011, and was released on October 14, 2011, in the United States.

== Reception ==
=== Box office ===
The Thing grossed $8,493,665 over the opening weekend and ended up third on the box office chart. It was distributed to 2,996 theaters and spent a total of one week on the top 10 chart, before dropping down to the 16th position in its second week. It concluded its domestic run with a total of $16,928,670. Its box office collections were called "an outright disappointment" by Box Office Mojo, who goes on to say "[the film] was naturally at a disadvantage: a vague "thing" doesn't give prospective audiences much to latch on to. It was therefore left up to fans of the original, who are already familiar with the concept, to turn out in strong numbers." The film grossed $14,576,617 in foreign countries, bringing the total worldwide box-office gross to $31,505,287.

=== Critical response ===
On review aggregator Rotten Tomatoes, the film has an approval rating of 34% based on 171 reviews, with an average rating of 5/10. The site's critical consensus reads, "It serves the bare serviceable minimum for a horror flick, but The Thing is all boo-scares and a slave to the far superior John Carpenter version." According to Metacritic, which assigned it a weighted average score of 49 out of 100 based on 31 critics, the film received "mixed or average reviews". In CinemaScore polls users gave the film a "B−" on an A+ to F scale.

Michael Phillips of the Chicago Tribune gave the film a rating of 3 out of 4, saying "While I wish van Heijningen's Thing weren't quite so in lust with the '82 model, it works because it respects that basic premise; and it exhibits a little patience, doling out its ickiest, nastiest moments in ways that make them stick". Andrew O'Hehir of Salon.com called it a "Loving prequel to a horror classic", saying "It's full of chills and thrills and isolated Antarctic atmosphere and terrific Hieronymus Bosch creature effects, and if it winks genially at the plot twists of Carpenter's film, it never feels even a little like some kind of inside joke." James Berardinelli gave it three stars out of four, saying that it "offers a similar overall experience" to the 1982 film, but "without replicating styles and situations". Christopher Orr of The Atlantic wrote that the narrative choices open to a prequel "exist on a spectrum from the unsurprising to the unfaithful", but van Heijningen "has managed this balancing act about as well as could be hoped" and although the line between homage and apery is a fine one, "in our age of steady knockoffs, retreads, and loosely branded money grabs, The Thing stands out as a competent entertainment, capably executed if not particularly inspired." Josh Bell of Las Vegas Weekly rated the film three out of five stars and wrote, "Winstead makes for an appealing protagonist, and Kate is portrayed as competent without being thrust into some unlikely action-hero role."

Kathleen Murphy of MSN Movies rated it two-and-a-half out of five stars, calling it "a subpar slasher movie tricked out with tired 'Ten Little Indians' tropes and rip-offs from both Carpenter and the Christian Nyby-Howard Hawks' 1951 version of the chilling tale that started it all, John W. Campbell Jr.'s Who Goes There?". Jim Vejvoda of IGN Movies also rated the film two-and-a-half out of five, saying, "This incarnation of The Thing is much like the creature it depicts: An insidious, defective mimic of the real, er, thing. It's not an entirely lost cause, but it is a needless one." Roger Ebert gave the film two and a half stars out of four, the same rating he gave the 1982 film. In Patrick Sauriol of Coming Attractions' review, he states, "Stack it up against John Carpenter's version and it looks less shiny, but let's face it, if you're that kind of Thing fan you're going to go see the new movie anyway. Try and judge today's Thing on its own merits." A brief review in Fangoria refers to the film as "Matthijs van Heijningen's prequel that proves modern CGI is no match for old-school makeup FX".

== Accolades ==
The film was nominated for two awards at the 38th Saturn Awards, but lost to The Girl with the Dragon Tattoo and X-Men: First Class.

Year	Award	Category	Recipient	Result	Ref.
2012	Rondo Hatton Classic Horror Awards	Best Film of 2011	The Thing	Nominated	
2012	Saturn Awards	Best Horror or Thriller Film	The Thing	Nominated	
2012	Saturn Awards	Best Make-Up	Tom Woodruff Jr. and Alec Gillis	Nominated	
2012	Visual Effects Society Awards	Outstanding Animated Character in a Live Action Feature Motion Picture	Lyndon Barrois, Fred Chapman, Greg Massie, Marco Menco	Nominated	

== Home media ==
The Thing was released on Blu-ray and DVD on January 31, 2012, in the US. As of 2013, the film earned an additional $10,436,405 through Blu-ray and DVD sales.

== Soundtrack ==
The music for the film, which was composed and conducted by Marco Beltrami, was released on October 11, 2011. The soundtrack was released under the label Varèse Sarabande.

== Tie-in media ==
On September 21, 2011, Dark Horse Comics released a three-part digital-only prequel comic, called The Thing: The Northman Nightmare, over a weekly basis. Taking place in Greenland, it follows a group of stranded Norsemen who must deal with the shape-shifting creature within a desolate village. The three-issue tale was written by Steve Niles, drawn by Patric Reynolds and colored by Dave Stewart.

Plans were in development for a sequel, taking place with Kate's character battling the creature on an oil platform near the South Pole, however these plans were abandoned following the critical and financial failure of the film.

== Halloween Horror Nights event ==
The film was made into a maze at both Universal Studios Hollywood's and Universal Orlando's 2011 Halloween Horror Nights events, having the subtitle Assimilation at Hollywood's version.

== Director's cut online campaign ==
In 2015, Aidan Cosky started a Change.org petition to release the "pilot version", which was promoted by Dread Central even though the petition closed due to a lack of followers. In 2020, the following social media hashtags: #ReleaseThePilotVersion and #ReleaseTheStudioADIcut were started in response to Zack Snyder's Justice League and the released BTS footage from Studio ADI on YouTube, while Bloody Disgusting and NerdBot published articles and YouTube videos calling it one of the most anticipated director's cut in horror films.
