= White Fang (1991 film) =

1991 American adventure film directed by Randal Kleiser

- Theatrical release poster by Drew Struzan
- Directed by: Randal Kleiser
- Screenplay by: Jeanne Rosenberg; Nick Thiel; David Fallon
- Based on: White Fang by Jack London
- Produced by: Markay Powell
- Starring: Klaus Maria Brandauer; Ethan Hawke; Seymour Cassel; James Remar; Susan Hogan
- Cinematography: Tony Pierce-Roberts
- Edited by: Lisa Day
- Music by: Basil Poledouris
- Production companies: Walt Disney Pictures; Silver Screen Partners IV
- Distributed by: Buena Vista Pictures Distribution
- Release date: January 18, 1991
- Running time: 107 minutes
- Country: United States
- Language: English
- Budget: $14 million
- Box office: $41 million

White Fang is a 1991 American northern period adventure drama film directed by Randal Kleiser, and starring Ethan Hawke, Klaus Maria Brandauer, and Seymour Cassel. Based on Jack London's 1906 novel of the same name, the film tells the story of the friendship between a young Klondike gold prospector and a wolfdog. White Fang is portrayed by a wolfdog, Jed, who also appeared in The Thing (1982) and The Journey of Natty Gann (1985). The film was released on January 18, 1991, by Buena Vista Pictures. A sequel to the film, White Fang 2: Myth of the White Wolf, was released in 1994.

== Plot ==
In 1898, during the Klondike Gold Rush, a young explorer named Jack Conroy arrives in Alaska from San Francisco in search his deceased father's mining claim with assistance from two mushers named Alex Larson and Clarence "Skunker" Thurston. While on their journey, the trio are stalked by a wolf pack. One night, while resting at a campfire, a wolf lures one of the sled dogs away from the group. Another wolf then chases the dog into the woods. In the ensuing fight, a female wolfdog named Kiche is mortally wounded by Skunker. Skunker tries to save his dog, but is killed by the pack. Later that night, the wolves return but are scared off by Jack and Alex using burning branches. The following morning, the wolves attack the two men, but they are saved when another sled team arrives.

Kiche hobbles back to her den, and her cub remains by her side. She eventually dies, leaving the pup to fend for himself. Jack and Alex reach a town where they plan to stay for the winter. A Hän band, meanwhile, find the pup, and the chief named Grey Beaver, realizing he is a wolfdog (a hybrid of a wolf and dog) from the color of his teeth, names him White Fang.

As spring comes, Jack and Alex resume their quest, but stop off at the Hän settlement. Grey Beaver explains that White Fang has been raised to obey, not to be friendly, but Jack seeks to change that. Jack's chance comes when he is attacked by a grizzly bear, who chases him until he takes cover under a woodpile. White Fang, seeing Jack in danger, intervenes and defends him from the bear, leading to him having a standoff with the animal which ends with the bear leaving. Afterwards, Jack and Alex later leave the settlement.

Not long after, White Fang is unfairly traded to Beauty Smith, a sadistic dogfighter and business rival of Alex's whose associates had previously stolen Jack's money; he blackmails Grey Beaver for the wolfdog, asserting that ownership of a wolf is considered illegal. Smith and his gang train and abuse White Fang into becoming a ferocious killing machine in order to enter him into illegal dogfights.

White Fang eventually meets his match in a brutal fight against a bulldog, but Jack happens upon the fight and intervenes in the nick of time; freeing White Fang while also swearing to expose Smith for his crimes. Having earlier reached his father's claim and begun the work of digging for gold, Jack returns with White Fang to the Larson homestead, seeking to transform White Fang's vicious and territorial nature.

Jack's attempts to tame White Fang eventually succeed, and the two develop a close bond. Alex and Jack mine for gold, striking it rich with the help of White Fang. One morning, Jack travels to town to claim proper ownership of the gold when Luke, one of Smith's colleagues, notices White Fang. Seeking retaliation and planning to steal the gold for himself, Smith and his men attack the Larson homestead with guns and set it on fire. White Fang attacks Tinker, who accidentally discharges his gun and wounds Luke. White Fang eventually subdues Smith until he is ordered by Jack to back down. Jack and Alex take Smith and his men prisoner, forcing them at gunpoint back into Klondike City, where they are turned over to the authorities.

Alex and his wife, Belinda, offer to take Jack back to San Francisco, but he lets Jack know that city life is no place for a wolf; he must let White Fang run free in the wild. Though White Fang cannot understand why Jack is trying to leave him, Jack's efforts by using a stick (which is White Fang's worst fear when he was under Smith) succeed in scaring the wolfdog off. Later, just as he is boarding the ship back to San Francisco, Jack realizes that his rightful place is in the Yukon and decides to stay behind alone and live off the land; Alex congratulates him by saying that it is what Jack's father would have wanted. After a short time, White Fang returns to the cabin site and happily reunites with Jack.

== Cast ==
- Ethan Hawke as Jack Conroy, a young man trying to fulfill his late father's wish to find gold in the treacherous Yukon Valley
- Jed as White Fang, a grey wolf-Siberian Husky hybrid who starts his life in the wild and becomes more of a tamed animal after he goes to Grey Beaver's camp
- Klaus Maria Brandauer as Alex Larson, an experienced, but gruff miner who knew Jack's father
- Seymour Cassel as Clarence 'Skunker' Thurston, Alex's companion
- James Remar as Beauty Smith, an evil dogfighter who buys up White Fang to fight dogs
- Susan Hogan as Belinda Casey, Alex's lover
- Suzanne Kent as Heather, Belinda's best friend
- Bill Moseley as Luke, Beauty Smith's colleague
- Pius Savage as Grey Beaver, a Hwëch'in chief who is White Fang's first master
- Clint Youngreen as Tinker, Beauty Smith's colleague
- Michael Davis Lally as Sykes, Beauty Smith's archrival
- Aaron Hotch as Mit-sah, Grey Beaver's son
- Diane E. Benson as Kloo-koosh, Grey Beaver's wife
- Bart the Bear as The Bear

== Production ==
The Walt Disney Company began filming on February 26, 1990, and officially ended this cinematic production five months later. Bart the Bear and the timber wolves were trained by professional employees of Heber City, Utah's Wasatch Rocky Mountain Wildlife.

== Reception ==
=== Critical reception ===
The film received mixed-to-positive reviews. On the review aggregator Rotten Tomatoes, the film holds an approval rating of 68% from 22 critics. The site's critical consensus states: "This glossy edition of White Fang shaves off the rough-hewn edges that made Jack London's epic story so distinct, but gorgeous photography and heartfelt performances make this an appealing adventure." On Metacritic, the film has a weighted average score of 62 out of 100 based on 17 reviews, indicating “generally favorable reviews".

Roger Ebert of the Chicago Sun-Times gave the film three stars out of four. He described it as a film that "holds the natural world in wonder and awe", and praised the actors' "authentic and understated” performances as well as the "magnificently photographed” cinematography.

=== Box office ===
The film was produced on a budget of $14 million and grossed $34,793,160 in the United States and Canada. The film was a particularly large box office hit in France, where it had 3,501,373 admissions and a gross of over 35 million French Franc ($6 million), becoming the fourth highest-grossing film of 1991.

== Awards ==
- Genesis Award for Feature Film – Family in 1993.
