= Thang =

Thang can refer to:

== Places ==
- Thắng, a township in Hiệp Hoà District, Bac Giang Province, Vietnam
- Thang, Ladakh, a village in Indian-administered Ladakh

== People ==
- Thắng (born 1995), Vietnamese singer-songwriter
- San Thang (born 1954), Australian chemist
- Ryan Thang (born 1987), American ice hockey player

== Other ==
- Thing in African-American Vernacular English
- Data Base Thang (DBT), a memory buffer structure in Berkeley DB interface

== See also ==
- Our Thing (disambiguation)
- Thing (disambiguation)
- The Things (disambiguation)
- Thring, a surname
- Thwing (disambiguation)
