= Van Heijningen =

van Heijningen is a surname. Notable people with the surname include:

- Matthijs van Heijningen (born 1944), Dutch film producer
- Matthijs van Heijningen Jr. (born 1965), Dutch filmmaker, writer, and producer, son of Matthijs
