= Thring =

Thring is a surname of British origin. It may refer to:

- Edward Thring (1821–1887), British educator
- F. W. Thring (1883–1936), Australian filmmaker
- Frank Thring (1926–1994), Australian actor
- Godfrey Thring (1823–1903), British hymn writer
- Henry Thring, 1st Baron Thring (1818–1907), British lawyer and parliamentary draftsman
- J. C. Thring (1824–1909), British football rulemaker
- Sir Arthur Thring (1860–1932), British lawyer and parliamentary draftsman
- Meredith Thring (1915–2006), British inventor

== See also ==
- Our Thing (disambiguation)
- Thang (disambiguation)
- Thing (disambiguation)
- Things (disambiguation)
- Thwing (disambiguation)
