= The Things (short story) =

Science fiction short story by Peter Watts

"The Things" is a science fiction short story by Peter Watts, revisiting the universe of John Carpenter's 1982 film The Thing (derived itself from John W. Campbell's story "Who Goes There?") from the viewpoint of the titular alien. It was first published on Clarkesworld, in January 2010.

== Synopsis ==
The events of The Thing as well as other happenings are told from the perspective of the alien, a shape-shifting sentient biomass that can absorb and imitate other lifeforms. The alien thinks of itself as an "explorer, an ambassador, a missionary" of the biomass it consists of, the primary instinct of which is to "commune", i.e. absorb and matriculate on a cellular level with other biologies. Confused, damaged, and unfamiliar with earthly fauna, the alien eventually learns the horrifying secret of man: Humans are individuals, "thinking cancers" who do not want to be assimilated and therefore seek to repel and even destroy it, unlike all other lifeforms it has encountered across the universe. The alien realizes that humans will not ever be able to understand its offerings and concludes that violent integration is the only way to save humanity from its isolation as individuals.

== Reception ==
The Things won the 2011 Shirley Jackson Award for Best Short Story, and was a finalist for the 2011 Hugo Award for Best Short Story, the 2011 Theodore Sturgeon Memorial Award, and the 2011 BSFA Award for Best Short Fiction. The audio version was a finalist for the 2010 Parsec Award for short fiction.

Wired called it "not only a startlingly effective portrayal of alien psychology, but also a thoughtful exploration of religion and the missionary impulse." Publishers Weekly called it a depiction of "blindly expansionist colonialism".

Watts has reported being told by Simon Pegg that many members of the 1982 film's cast and crew enjoyed the story.

At Io9, Annalee Newitz praised it for "successfully represent(ing) a truly alien point of view", and called it "mind-bending". Gardner Dozois similarly lauded Watts for his "excellent job of showing a totally alien way of looking at life", but noted that people who (like him) were more familiar with the 1951 film than with the 1982 remake "may be a little confused".

Chad Orzel was considerably more negative, calling it "far from impressive", with "two main weaknesses forced on the story by the basic concept": the extent to which it requires familiarity with the 1982 film, and Watts' effort to "basically retcon the goofy biology of the movie alien, which was based on the goofy biology of a John Campbell short story from the pulp magazine era."

== Adaptations ==
The Russian comic-adaptation «НЕЧТОжества» was published in 2017. It was created by artist Evgeniya Karpukhina.
