= Our Thing =

Our Thing may refer to:

- Cosa Nostra (literally Our Thing), an organized crime group
- American Mafia, also sometimes known as "Our Thing", an organized crime group
- Our Thing (album), an album by Joe Henderson
- "Our Thing", a song by Elliott Smith, a non-album track from XO
- UnserDing (Our Thing), a radio program produced by German broadcaster Saarländischer Rundfunk

== See also ==
- Thang (disambiguation)
- Thing (disambiguation)
- The Things (disambiguation)
- Thring, a surname
- Thwing (disambiguation)
