= The Thing (video game) =

2002 video game

- North American cover art
- Developer: Computer Artworks (Note: 2024 remaster developed by Nightdive Studios.)
- Publisher: Black Label Games (Note: PlayStation 2 and Xbox versions published by Black Label Games and Konami; 2024 remaster published by Nightdive Studios.)
- Directors: William Latham; Mark Atkinson
- Producer: Chris Hadley
- Designer: Andrew Curtis
- Programmers: Diarmid Campbell; Mark Atkinson
- Artist: Joel Smith
- Composer: Keith Tinman
- Platforms: Windows; PlayStation 2; Xbox; Remaster: Nintendo Switch; PlayStation 4; PlayStation 5; Windows; Xbox One; Xbox Series X/S
- Release: August 20, 2002: Windows; NA: August 20, 2002; EU: September 20, 2002 Xbox; NA: September 3, 2002; EU: September 20, 2002 PlayStation 2; NA: September 10, 2002; EU: September 20, 2002 Remastered Switch, PlayStation 4, PlayStation 5, Windows, Xbox One, Xbox Series X/S; WW: December 5, 2024
- Genres: Third-person shooter, survival horror
- Mode: Single-player

The Thing is a 2002 squad-based third-person shooter survival horror video game developed by Computer Artworks and co-published by Vivendi Universal Games (under the Black Label Games label) and Konami for Microsoft Windows, PlayStation 2, and Xbox. Versions for the Game Boy Color and Game Boy Advance were also planned, but were both cancelled early in development.

Set as a sequel to John Carpenter's 1982 film of the same name, the story focuses on Captain Blake, a member of a United States Army Special Forces team sent to the Antarctic outpost featured in the film to determine what has happened to the research team, only to find himself caught in an invisible fight for survival against the titular shape-shifting alien, who seemingly has regained life despite being destroyed at the end of the film. Other survivors encountered and ordered by Blake assist the battle against the creature's different forms, all while being fully aware that they can trust nobody. The game was endorsed by Carpenter, who has a cameo appearance in the game.

The Thing was a commercial success, selling over one million units worldwide across all platforms, and receiving generally positive reviews. A sequel was in the early stages of development, but was canceled when Computer Artworks went into receivership in 2003. A remastered version of the game was released on December 5, 2024.

== Gameplay ==
The basic gameplay in The Thing is that of a traditional third-person shooter; the player character, Blake, can run and shoot, strafe, crouch, interact with the environment, interact with NPCs and use items, such as flashlights, fire extinguishers or flares. The player also has the option to enter first-person mode for more accurate targeting during combat. When in first-person mode, however, the character cannot move, except to side-step a little to the left and right. Weaponry includes pistols, grenades, sniper rifles, flamethrowers, shotguns, submachine guns, assault rifles, grenade launchers and fixed heavy machine guns. Other items featured in the game are health packs, explosives, ammunition, portable blood test-kits and adrenaline injections.

Blake fights a boss in The Thing. The HUD shows his health (red bar), currently selected weapon and ammo count (on the right), and his left hand item (in this case flame grenades).

Enemies come in three main varieties. "Scuttlers" are small Things formed from the limbs and appendages of infected personnel. They are fast, but weak, and can be killed simply by shooting. "Walkers" are larger than scuttlers, and much stronger. To kill them, the player must weaken them using gunfire before then using the flamethrower, as only fire can completely kill them. Bosses are larger and much more powerful than Walkers, and although each one requires a specific strategy to defeat, the principle is the same; weaken it with gunfire before burning it.

One of the main features of The Thing's gameplay is the inclusion of multiple NPCs who join Blake at various points throughout the game. At any one time, the player can control up to four characters; Blake and three NPCs. There are three types of NPC in the game; engineers, soldiers and medics. Engineers can repair fuse boxes, which control locked doors, computers and save points. Soldiers have more health, and are better shots than engineers or medics. They are thus more suited to combat. Medics are capable of healing both Blake and any other injured NPCs, and carry unlimited health packs. The player can issue basic commands to each NPC, such as ordering them to follow Blake, ordering them to remain where they are, ordering them to give Blake their weapon, and, in the case of engineers, ordering them to fix a fuse box.

NPC AI is determined primarily by the "Fear/trust system". The trust system determines whether the NPCs will follow Blake's orders and join him in combat. To do so, the player must ensure the NPC trusts Blake, and does not suspect him of being a Thing. NPCs have four levels of trust; red, amber, green and 100%. Red means they are convinced Blake is a Thing and will attack him. Amber means they are not sure if he is a Thing, and although they won't attack him, they won't follow his orders. Green means they trust him and will follow his orders. 100% means they have complete faith in him, will follow his orders, and even if he attacks another NPC, they will support him. To gain the trust of NPCs, Blake can give them weapons and ammo, heal them, put himself at risk to protect them, or use a blood test kit on himself to prove he is not a Thing. Actions which deplete trust include accidentally shooting teammates, taking away teammate's weapons or ammo, or pointing a weapon at them for a sustained period of time to force them to do something.

The fear system dictates how scared a given NPC is. There are three levels of fear; normal, scared and "Crack-up". When an NPC enters "Crack-up" mode, Blake has only a limited amount of time to reduce their fear level, or the NPC will kill themselves, attack Blake and other NPCs, attack the environment, or die of a heart attack. Each NPC responds differently to different surroundings; for example, medics tend to scare easier than soldiers. Generally, however, fear increases when entering rooms covered in blood, entering dark locations, finding particularly disfigured corpses, being attacked by multiple enemies, and hearing enemies but not being able to see them. When an NPC is scared, it affects their performance; soldiers become less accurate, engineers take longer to repair fuse boxes and medics don't heal characters as quickly. Blake can reduce fear by giving NPCs adrenaline, topping up their ammo, moving away from particular locations, or successfully defeating enemies.

The game also features an infection system, which determines whether or not an NPC is infected by the Thing. Although most NPCs are scripted to transform into a Thing at specific points in the game, they can also be infected at any time prior to this. When the team comes under attack by enemies, the possibility of infection is based upon a probability system whereby any teammate who comes into direct contact with an enemy can be infected. Although infection does not alter their immediate behavior, it will result in them turning into a walker-Thing after a set period of time, at which point they will attack the team.

The Windows PC port features patches that fix issues present on the consoles. Furthermore, "Patch 1.2 adds a very handy mouse-look mode, which makes the game play more like a modern PC game."

== Plot ==
The game begins at U.S. Outpost 31 in Antarctica, three months after the events of the film. Two teams of U.S. Special Forces have arrived to investigate the U.S. camp and the nearby Norwegian camp. Captain J.F. Blake (voiced by Per Solli) is the leader of Bravo Team, who are investigating the U.S. camp, whilst Alpha Team, under the command of Captain Pierce, investigate the Norwegian camp. Both teams are under the overall command of Colonel Whitley (William B. Davis), who is in constant communication via radio. Whilst investigating Outpost 31, Bravo Team soon discover the small spacecraft made by the Blair-Thing and a tape recorder with a message from R.J. MacReady, resigned to their fate. They then find information detailing how the base has been infiltrated by an extraterrestrial lifeform that is capable of imitating the physical appearance and characteristics of any other living organism it assimilates. They also find the body of Childs, one of the two survivors at the end of the film, who has died from hypothermia. The film's other survivor, MacReady, is nowhere to be found. Under orders from Whitley, Bravo Team set up C-4 explosives throughout the facility, which are detonated remotely, destroying the outpost.

Whilst the rest of Bravo Team are airlifted to safety, Blake heads to the Norwegian camp to locate and reinforce Alpha Team, with whom contact has been lost. He soon learns they have been attacked and scattered by a horde of "scuttlers"; small limbs and appendages of much larger Things. Eventually Blake finds Pierce. However, he has become paranoid, believing everyone to be infected and demanding Blake agrees to a blood test to prove he is still human. Blake does so, and he and Pierce set out to find a way to reestablish communication with Whitley. However, they are soon separated, and with no other choice, Blake continues on, finding the radio room, but discovering someone has stolen the radio and fled into a nearby warehouse.

En route to the warehouse, Blake encounters Pierce in an observatory. However, he is infected, and rather than allow himself to turn into a Thing, Pierce shoots himself in the head. Blake continues to pursue the man with the radio, eventually discovering that he is a Thing. Blake kills him, and takes the radio. Moving on, he enters the "Pyron" sub-facility beneath the Norwegian base, learning of a company called Gen-Inc., who have installed a research team under the command of Dr. Sean Faraday (John Carpenter). Gen-Inc. had been conducting biological experiments on the Things when their team was infected, and now only a few survivors remain within the facility. Blake rescues Faraday and attempts to leave. However, he is prevented from doing so by Whitley, who shoots him with a tranquillizer gun, and reveals to Faraday that he has infected himself with the Thing gene, claiming it to be controllable, something of which he is living proof, and therefore demonstrating its capability as a weapon. When Faraday attempts to eradicate the Thing virus, Whitley kills him.

Blake awakens in the now abandoned "Strata" research facility, and learns that his cells have a unique resistance to infection by the Thing virus. After escaping his confinement, he unearths a government conspiracy whereby Gen-Inc. isolated a microbiological form of the Thing called the "Cloud virus", which was intended for use in biological warfare. However, the Thing infected everyone at the facility. Blake learns that Whitley was in charge of the entire operation, and has injected himself with a strain of the virus known as "Cloud Virus B4" in an attempt to cure his terminal cancer.

Blake fights his way through the facility, battling numerous black ops under Whitley's command, as well as many Things. Learning that Whitley plans to distribute the Thing virus around the world using a fleet of airplanes, he is able to destroy them before they take off. Eventually, Blake confronts Whitley himself. He sets him on fire, but Whitley is unhurt. He explains that an airlift team is on its way and when it arrives, he will begin global infection. Whitley flees further into the base, pursued by Blake. At the partly excavated site of the original Thing's spaceship, Whitley transforms into a massive Thing creature. Blake encounters a helicopter pilot, who helps him defeat the Whitley-Thing with a mounted M60 machine gun. As the helicopter flies away from the base, the pilot reveals himself to be R.J. MacReady.

== Development ==
The Thing is a phenomenal franchise that gamers have been requesting for a long time. This franchise presents an incredible opportunity to draw upon Universal's rich movie history and today's technology to create a one-of-a-kind gaming experience.

— Jim Wilson; Universal Interactive president

In 2000, when Universal Interactive began looking through Universal Studios' back-catalogue of feature films with potential for adaptation as video game franchises, they quickly decided one of the most lucrative such intellectual properties was the 1982 film directed by John Carpenter, The Thing. The film was based on the 1938 John W. Campbell short story "Who Goes There?", which had already been filmed by Howard Hawks in 1951 as The Thing from Another World. Carpenter's version was the most widely known iteration of the story, however, and the ambiguous ending to the film was seen as particularly attractive in terms of a video game which could explore what happens after the events of the film. Universal and Konami announced the game on September 20, 2000, before development had begun, confirming it would not be an adaptation of the film, but a sequel. They also revealed the game would be released for "next generation consoles", of which only the Xbox was initially confirmed, as well as the Game Boy Color and Game Boy Advance, the Handheld version was rumored to support with the Mobile Game Boy Adapter (Note: Japanese: モバイルアダプタGB, Hepburn: Mobairu Adaputa Jī Bī) device (although both versions were quietly canceled early in production).

If ever there was a franchise with fantastic games' potential, this is it! Move over Alien, move over Predator, The Thing has arrived and it is crueler, more intelligent and more terrifying than any other previous opponent! Computer Artworks is delighted to be selected by Universal Interactive Studios to bring this cult film to the world of games. Combined with Konami's huge marketing muscle we are looking forward to a dynamic chart success.

— William Latham; director

Based upon Computer Artworks' 2000 video game Evolva, Universal invited them to make a pitch for the game. For the pitch, Computer Artworks reskinned a level from Evolva with an Antarctic theme and a Thing-like creature as a boss fight. The pitch impressed Universal sufficiently, and the deal was signed. According to the game's director, William Latham, "Universal were very good to work with. They told us to come up with original ideas. It wasn't like a Harry Potter license. There weren't strict guidelines, as long as we retained the quality of the original work." Drawing inspiration from Aliens, the 1956 version of Invasion of the Body Snatchers, Half-Life and Area 51 conspiracy theories, Computer Artworks began work on the game in November 2000. On January 16, they announced the game would also be released for Windows, with a release date slated for mid-2002. The game was first shown at Universal Interactive's "Gamer's Day" on August 13, where it was confirmed it would also be coming to PlayStation 2. A non-playable demo was shown, and a Q&A session was held with the developers. Universal revealed details of the fear/trust and infection systems, which they said would form an integral aspect of the basic gameplay.

A playable demo for the PlayStation 2 was released on March 25, 2002. In an interview with GameSpot on April 1, Universal Interactive producer Peter Wanat explained "the trust-fear dynamic was born out of the film and the simple fact that we needed to give the main character NPCs to interact with. That whole not knowing who is human and who is "the thing" was a big part of the movie and worked for the game really well." Wanat cited games such as Resident Evil, Silent Hill, Grand Theft Auto III, and Max Payne as influences. However, he stated;

The gameplay is more action horror. We have built on all the elements of survival horror games in the past, but what we wanted to do was get away from the slow "plodding for hours" style of gameplay, which made us more likely to fall asleep than wet our pants from fear. So we made the shooting aspects more frenzied in order to really wake the player up. So when we do slow the pace back down, your sense that any minute it might get hairy again really starts to mess with you.

The trust system in The Thing. In this screenshot, Carter does not trust Blake, and will not follow him (top), perform an action for him (left) or give him a weapon (bottom). The only option available to the player is to give Carter a weapon (right). Upon doing so, Carter will trust Blake, and the other options will become available.

Speaking in 2014, Latham reiterated Wanat's claims that the fear/trust and infection systems came from a desire to reproduce a strong element from the film;

It was early days for squad-based games, and the fear, trust and infection mechanic was quite innovative for the time. It came from very early meetings where we all watched the film to come up with brand identifiers. We decided there should be a novel AI element that mimicked what happened within the film: you never know who's going to turn.

Similarly, designer Andrew Curtis said;

We always planned The Thing to be more action-horror, and having had some experience in squad-based gaming with Evolva, it seemed right to have the game as squad-based so we could support the core ideas of fear, trust and infection. It was more about the tension of not knowing what was going to happen next - was the guy next to you going to try and shoot you, go insane or morph into a freakish beast with thrashing tentacles?

Originally the game was to be more open world based, with the possibility that each NPC could turn into a Thing at any moment completely randomized. Curtis also hoped the player could get to the end of the game with many, perhaps all, of the NPCs still alive. However, this kind of open-endedness proved impossible to implement, with Curtis, pointing out "It was of course very naïve as it caused huge problems with the squad command menu and dynamically balancing the encounters and resources required for the NPC." Ultimately, NPC characters were scripted to change into Things at specific points, irrespective of the player's actions. This led to a much criticized aspect of the game; the player can test an NPC to find he is human only for him to change into a Thing mere seconds later. Programmer Diarmid Campbell explains;

The infection system was conceived as a simulation that had the capacity to play out differently each time you played the game, leading to potential replayability. However, the game was also very story-led with set-pieces that required specific characters getting infected at certain times. These two aspects were constantly pulling in different directions. I think we ended up with a slightly messy compromise with good story elements and a genuinely new mechanic but also some logical inconsistencies which, ironically, became glaringly obvious if you played the game more than once.

Similarly, Latham states "We had to scale it back. There were a few cheats to make it entertaining. We tried to mimic human behavior, but at the end of the day it didn't matter too much how you treated your teammates."

The Thing also features a vocal ending theme "After Me", performed by Memphis-based Nu metal band Saliva, from its second studio album Every Six Seconds.

In August 2002, Vivendi Universal formed a new publishing division called Black Label Games; a label which Ken Cron (Vivendi Universal Games CEO) stated "will focus on delivering innovative, high-quality titles to satisfy the growing consumer appetite for increasingly sophisticated content." The game transitioned from Universal Interactive over to the new label.

The console versions are co-published with Konami, with Vivendi Universal handling distribution.

== Reception ==
Reception

Aggregate score
Aggregator	Score		
Aggregator	PC	PS2	Xbox
Metacritic	77/100	78/100	78/100

Review scores
Publication	Score		
Publication	PC	PS2	Xbox
Eurogamer		5/10	
GameSpot	7.7/10	8.4/10	8.4/10
GameSpy	3/5	4/5	4/5
IGN	8.5/10	8.3/10	8.3/10
Official U.S. PlayStation Magazine		3/5	
Official Xbox Magazine (US)			8/10
PC Gamer (US)	70%		

Awards
Publication	Award
Game Developers Conference	Game Innovation Spotlight (2003)
Golden Joystick Awards	2002 edition: Best Use of a Film Licence

The Thing received "generally favorable reviews" on all three platforms; the PlayStation 2 version holds an aggregate score of 78 out of 100 on Metacritic, based on twenty-seven reviews; the Xbox version a 78 out of 100, based on twenty-one reviews; and the PC version a 77 out of 100, based on nineteen reviews.

Eurogamer's Kristan Reed scored the PlayStation 2 version a 5 out of 10, arguing that the trust/fear system "is nowhere near as much of a neat gameplay innovation as the hype had some people believe [...] As a squad based game it would work far better if you ever had to care a great deal for anyone's survival. As it is, most of the team seem to split off once a level's over (or turn into aliens at pre-determined moments during it), so you're left merely using each NPC as a means of progression." He was also critical of the graphics, which he argued "look old school, with bad texturing, uninteresting particle effects, and vanilla architecture." He concluded, "If you can pick up The Thing cheap you won't be too disappointed; it's by no means a bad game, but it's all the more disappointing thanks to the fact that it could and should have been brilliant."

GameSpy's Tom Chick scored the PC version a 3 out of 5, writing "The Thing starts out strong, but it's the sort of game you don't have to feel bad about not finishing. Of course, you're paying for a full game, so if dollar value is your main criteria, you might be better off renting John Carpenter's movie, reading the original short story, and then having a laugh at the walking carrot in the 1951 version." Tom Ham scored both the PlayStation 2 and Xbox versions a 4 out of 5, writing "not only is the game a solid action-adventure frenzy, it also manages to tell a tale that is truly chilling. Combined with topnotch graphics, incredible use of sound, and a very cool trust/fear interface, The Thing manages to do what so many movie licensed games have failed to do -- succeed."

GameSpot's Erik Wolpaw scored the PC version a 7.7 out of 10, and although he was very critical of the trust/fear system and the controls, he concluded "The Thing is kind of short, it's not especially effective at making you feel afraid, its most intriguing gameplay elements are somewhat extraneous, and it suffers from a wonky control scheme. Yet, thanks to some high production values and consistently interesting action scenes, The Thing rises above these flaws. It could have been great, but in light of the checkered history of movie-licensed games, being good at all is a pretty impressive achievement." Ryan MacDonald scored the PlayStation 2 version an 8.4 out of 10, writing "When you look at everything the game offers in terms of its gameplay, presentation, and story, it's hard not to appreciate The Thing whether you're a fan of the film it's based on or just a fan of the survival horror genre in general." He also scored the Xbox version an 8.4 out of 10, calling it "The best of the three, combining sharp graphics similar to those found in the PC version with the superior console-style control found in the PlayStation 2 version." GameSpot later named The Thing the second-best Xbox game of September 2002.

IGN's Douglass C. Perry scored the PlayStation 2 and Xbox versions an 8.3 out of 10. Although he was critical of the scripted nature of the infection system, he concluded "The deeper you play, the more satisfying and challenging it becomes, and the more it draws you in. The Thing is well-paced, designed with an excellent variety of levels [...] Everything is consistent with the movie, the theme of which has been handled with exquisite care and thought. With the exception of the blood test goofs and the rather thin storyline, The Thing warrants your time and money." Steve Polak scored the PC version an 8.5 out of 10, writing "The Thing is, for the most part, an immersive and enjoyable game. The visuals and sound are top-notch and the sense of desperation you feel when you are stuck outside and about to succumb to the elements or being hunted by packs of the foul creatures is very real. The squad-based elements and the way you keep your men from losing their minds also adds to the depth of the play experience."

=== Sales and awards ===
The game was a commercial success, selling over one million units worldwide. At the 2003 Game Developers Conference, The Thing won the "Game Innovation Spotlight" award. It was nominated for GameSpot's annual "Best Action Adventure Game on Xbox" award, which went to Tom Clancy's Splinter Cell. During the 6th Annual Interactive Achievement Awards, The Thing received a nomination for "Computer Action/Adventure Game of the Year" by the Academy of Interactive Arts & Sciences.

== Canceled sequel ==
A sequel went into development after the first game proved a critical and commercial success, but it was canceled when Computer Artworks went into receivership in October 2003. According to Diarmid Campbell, "We had the contract in place to make the sequel and were pretty excited about it. We had a very cool prototype of 'dynamic infection' and some really imaginative thing 'burst-outs'. I particularly liked the one where the person would split in half and their top half would jump to the ceiling and start swinging around like an orangutan with his intestines turned into tentacles." However, the project never developed beyond the proof of concept stage, with Computer Artworks producing some concept art, showing locations and enemies, and two short demo videos, but nothing else.

== Remaster ==
The Thing was remastered by Nightdive Studios. It was released for Nintendo Switch, PlayStation 4, PlayStation 5, Windows, Xbox One and Xbox Series X/S on December 5, 2024. There is trophy support for PlayStation and achievements for Xbox and Steam players.
