= Jed (wolfdog) =

Animal actor

- Jed in The Thing (1982)
- Species: Wolfdog
- Sex: Male
- Born: 1977; Bellingham, Washington, U.S.
- Died: June 1995 (aged 17–18); Acton, California, U.S.
- Occupation: Animal actor
- Employer: Walt Disney Pictures; Universal Pictures
- Notable role: The Thing; White Fang
- Years active: 1982–1995
- Tricks: Action and stunt
- Owners: Gary Winkler (1977–1981); Clint Rowe (1981–1991); Jean Simpson (1991–1994); Clint Rowe (1994–1995 Death)
- Residence: United States
- Appearance: Grey and white coat

Jed was an American animal actor, known for his roles in the movies White Fang (1991), White Fang 2: Myth of the White Wolf (1994), The Journey of Natty Gann (1985), and The Thing (1982). He was born in 1977, and died in June 1995. He was a Vancouver Island wolf–Alaskan Malamute hybrid.

== Life and career ==
Jed was born at Whatcom Humane Society in Bellingham, Washington where Gerhardt "Gary" Winkler, Henry Winkler's second cousin, adopted him as part of his collection of Siberian Huskies and Alaskan Malamutes. His first role was a brief one as a Norwegian dog in John Carpenter's The Thing (1982). The character he played in the film was the first form to be taken by a shapeshifting alien creature. Some scenes required him to behave in an unsettling and unnatural way.

Jed's performance in The Thing has been lauded by the many fans of the movie. His next film appearance was in Disney's The Journey of Natty Gann, where he played a wolf who befriended and protected the protagonist. In 1991, Jed starred as Jack London's titular character White Fang in the Walt Disney film of the same name, starring a young Ethan Hawke.

Jed was trained by Clint Rowe, who was involved in the films that Jed was cast in and was also associated with the film Turner and Hooch. After filming Disney's sequel to White Fang, Jed permanently remained with Clint Rowe in Acton, California, until his death in June 1995.

== Filmography ==
- The Thing (1982), as The Thing (uncredited)
- The Journey of Natty Gann (1985), as the Wolf
- White Fang (1991), as White Fang
- White Fang 2: Myth of the White Wolf (1994), as White Fang (uncredited)

== See also ==
- List of individual dogs
