= Who Goes There? =

1938 American science fiction novella

- Author: Don A. Stuart
- Language: English
- Genre: Science fiction, horror
- Published in: Astounding Science Fiction
- Publication date: August 1938
- Publication place: United States
- Media type: Novella
- Pages: 158 as Frozen Hell (paperback)

Who Goes There? is a science fiction horror novella by American author John W. Campbell, written under the pen name Don A. Stuart. Its story follows a group of researchers and support personnel trapped in a scientific outpost in Antarctica that has been infested by shapeshifting monsters able to absorb and perfectly imitate any living being, including humans.

Who Goes There? was first published in the August 1938 issue of Astounding Science Fiction magazine and was also printed as The Thing from Another World, as well as included in the collection by the same title. Its extended version, found in an early manuscript titled Frozen Hell, was published under this title in 2019.

The story greatly influenced the genre of sci-fi horror. It was directly adapted to film as The Thing from Another World by Christian Nyby in 1951 and as The Thing by John Carpenter in 1982. Its many other adaptations, and works inspired by it, have spanned various media.

== History ==
In December 1936, John W. Campbell himself had published a short story titled "Brain Stealers of Mars" in Thrilling Wonder Stories, which also features shape-shifting, mind-reading aliens. The earlier story has a humorous tone, but strikes a philosophical note as members of another alien race describe living stoically alongside the shapeshifters.

Who Goes There? was first published in the August 1938 issue of Astounding Science Fiction in a 12-chapter version, which also appears in Adventures in Time and Space and The Antarktos Cycle: Horror and Wonder at the Ends of the Earth under the title The Thing from Another World. An extended 14-chapter version was later included in The Best of John W. Campbell and the collection Who Goes There?. Campbell renewed the copyright in 1965. In 1973, the story was voted by the Science Fiction Writers of America as one of the stories representing the "most influential, important, and memorable science fiction that has ever been written." It was promptly published with the other top voted stories in The Science Fiction Hall of Fame, Volume Two.

=== Frozen Hell ===
In 2018, it was discovered that Who Goes There? was actually a shortened version of Campbell's unpublished larger novel with working titles Frozen Hell and Pandora (a reference to the legend of Pandora). Two of its draft versions, including an entirely different opening, were found in a box of manuscripts sent by Campbell to Harvard University. The discovery was made by author and biographer Alec Nevala-Lee, during his research on a biography of Campbell and other authors from the Golden Age of Science Fiction. Campbell first attempted selling the story to Argosy, but was rejected by its editor John "Jack" Francis Byrne. After some rewriting and significant trimming, it was eventually accepted by Astounding's editor F. Orlin Tremaine.

A Kickstarter campaign was launched to publish the full novel that same year. When completed, the campaign had raised more than $155,000, compared to its original $1,000 goal. An edited version of the two original drafts was published by Wildside Press under the full title Frozen Hell: The Book That Inspired The Thing, illustrated by Bob Eggleton and with a preface by Nevala-Lee and an introduction by Robert Silverberg. E-book versions of the novel began distributing digitally to campaign backers on January 16, 2019, with physical copies following in June the same year.

== Plot ==
A group of American researchers, isolated in their scientific station in Antarctica towards the end of winter, discover an alien spaceship buried in the ice, where it crashed twenty million years before. They try to thaw the inside of the spacecraft with a thermite charge but end up accidentally destroying it when the ship's magnesium hull is ignited by the charge. They manage to recover an alien creature from the ancient ice, which the researchers believe was searching for heat when it was frozen. Thawing revives the alien (simply referred to as the Thing), a being which can assume the appearance, memories, and personality of a living organism it devours, while maintaining its body mass for further reproduction. Unknown to them, the Thing immediately kills and then imitates the crew's physicist, a man named Connant; with some 90 pounds of its matter left over, it tries to become a sled dog. The crew discovers the dog-Thing and kills it midway through the transformation process. Pathologist Blair, who had lobbied for thawing the Thing, goes insane with paranoia and guilt, vowing to kill everyone at the base to save mankind; he is isolated within a locked cabin at their outpost. Connant is also isolated as a precaution, and a "rule-of-four" is initiated in which all personnel must remain under the close scrutiny of three others.

The crew realizes that they must isolate their base and therefore disable their airplanes and vehicles, and pretend that everything is normal during radio transmissions to prevent any rescue attempts. The researchers try to figure out who may have been replaced by the Thing to destroy the imitations before they can escape and take over the world. The task is found to be almost impossibly difficult when they realize that the Thing is shapeshifting and telepathic, reading minds and projecting thoughts. A sled dog is conditioned by human blood injections (from Dr. Copper and expedition commander Garry) to provide a human-immunity serum test, as in rabbits. The initial test of Connant is inconclusive, as they realize that the test animal received both human and alien blood, meaning that either Copper or Garry is an alien. Assistant commander McReady takes over and deduces that all the other animals at the station, save the test dog, have already become imitations; all are killed by electrocution and their corpses are burned.

Everyone suspects each other by now but must stay together for safety, deciding who will take turns sleeping and standing watch. Tensions mount and some men begin to go mad, thinking that they are already the last human, or wondering if they could know whether they were human any longer. Ultimately, Kinner, the cook, is murdered and accidentally revealed to be a Thing. McReady realizes that even small pieces of the creature will behave as independent organisms. He then uses this fact to test which men have been "converted" by taking blood samples from everyone and dipping a heated wire in the vial of blood. Each man's blood is tested, one at a time, and the donor is immediately killed if his blood recoils from the wire. Fourteen men, including Connant and Garry, are revealed to be Things. The remaining men go to test the isolated Blair, and on the way, see the first albatross of the Antarctic spring flying overhead; they shoot the bird to prevent a Thing from infecting it and flying to civilization.

When they reach Blair's cabin, they discover that he is a Thing. They realize that it has been left to its own devices for a week, coming and going as it pleased, as it is able to squeeze under doors by transforming itself. With the creatures inside the base destroyed, McReady and two others enter the cabin to kill the Thing that was once Blair. McReady forces it out into the snow and destroys it with a blowtorch. Afterwards, the trio discover that the Thing was dangerously close to finishing the construction of a nuclear-powered anti-gravity device that would have allowed it to escape to the outside world.

== Characters ==
=== Humans ===
Although the expedition based at Big Magnet comprises 37 members, only 16 are named in the story, and all but three by last name alone. By the end of the story, 15 of them have been replaced by alien impostors.

- Barclay: present at alien excavation.
- Benning: aviation mechanic. He survives. He appears in the 1982 adaptation renamed George Bennings with the occupation of meteorologist, and is portrayed by Peter Maloney.
- Blair: biologist, present at alien excavation. Blair goes insane after the Thing escapes, due to his desire to thaw the Thing leading to the subsequent disaster. Blair is locked in the tool shed, where he is replaced by a Thing. Blair appears in the 1982 adaptation portrayed by A. Wilford Brimley.
- (Bart) Caldwell: a member of the team.
- Clark: dog handler. Clark is later revealed to be a Thing. He appears in the 1982 adaptation, played by Richard Masur.
- Connant: physicist, cosmic ray specialist. He is the first member of the team to be assimilated. In Frozen Hell, he is given the first name Jerry.
- Dr. Copper: physician, present at the alien excavation. Copper appears in the 1982 adaptation portrayed by Richard Dysart.
- (Samuel) Dutton: revealed to be a Thing.
- Garry: expedition commander. Garry is eventually revealed as a Thing and killed. Garry appears in the 1982 adaptation portrayed by Donald Moffat.
- Kinner: scar-faced cook. Kinner is later revealed to be a Thing. His film counterpart is renamed Nauls and played by T.K. Carter.
- McReady: expedition second-in-command, meteorologist, present at alien excavation. McReady appears in the 1982 adaptation portrayed by Kurt Russell, now with the name "R.J. MacReady" and the occupation of helicopter pilot. MacReady reappears in the video game played by Russell and in the comics based on the film.
- (Vance) Norris: muscular physicist. Norris appears in the 1982 adaptation portrayed by Charles Hallahan, though he is given Kinner's fate and much of Kinner's characterization.
- Pomroy: livestock handler.
- Ralsen: sledge keeper.
- Van Wall: chief pilot, present at alien excavation.

=== Non-humans ===
- "The Thing", the antagonist, is a malevolent, shapeshifting alien life form. It appears in all three film adaptions. In the first film (1951), the Thing is depicted as a tall, menacing humanoid alien that is composed of vegetable matter. In the two later film adaptations, the Things retain their ability to shapeshift, although they do not have telepathic abilities.
- Charnauk: lead Alaskan husky, first openly attacked by the Thing.
- Chinook and Jack: two other huskies.

== Adaptations and spin-offs ==
=== Film and television ===
The Thing from Another World (1951) is a loose adaptation of the original story. Here, the alien is a humanoid invader (i.e., two arms, two legs, a head) from an unknown planet. A plant-based life form, the alien and its race need animal blood to survive. He, or rather it, is a one-alien army, capable of creating an entire army of invaders from seed pods contained within its body.

The John Carpenter 1982 adaptation The Thing, from a screenplay by Bill Lancaster, sticks more closely to Campbell's original story. Carpenter remade the film due to The Thing from Another World being one of his favorite films, and the 1951 adaptation featured on a television in Carpenter's original Halloween. Carpenter's idea was not to compete with the direction of the earlier film. In both the novella and this adaptation, the Thing can imitate any animal-based life form, absorbing the respective hosts' personalities and memories along with their bodies (although the telepathy aspect is omitted). When the story begins in an American outpost, the creature has already been discovered and released from the ice by a separate Norwegian expedition. This version maintains the digestions and metamorphoses alluded to in the original novella, via practical effects such as animatronics.

A prequel to the Carpenter version, also titled The Thing, was released in 2011. It was directed by Matthijs van Heijningen Jr. and written by Eric Heisserer, combining traditional special effects of the original film with computer generated imagery. In response to this, the special effects artist Alec Gillis crowdfunded and made the film Harbinger Down in 2015.

==== Projects ====
During the early 2000s, Frank Darabont and David Leslie Johnson-McGoldrick of Darkwoods Productions worked on Return of the Thing, a four-part miniseries project for Sci Fi Channel.

In 2020, a new film was announced to be produced by Jason Blum's Blumhouse Productions and released and distributed by Universal Pictures (as a part of the former's first-look deal). The project is based on the Frozen Hell edition of the story. John Carpenter later confirmed that he was involved with the project. In 2023, Carpenter also revealed that there may be a direct sequel to his original film, The Thing 2.

=== Literature ===
William F. Nolan, author of Logan's Run, wrote an unfilmed screen treatment of Who Goes There? for Universal Studios in 1978; it was published in 2009 in the Rocket Ride Books edition of Who Goes There?. Nolan's alternate take on Campbell's story reduced the number of characters and downplayed monster elements in favor of an "impostor" theme.

An early draft of Lancaster's screenplay for The Thing was novelised by Alan Dean Foster in 1982 and released simultaneously with the film. Because it was an early draft, it featured several scenes that differed greatly from those found in the finished film, and two of the supporting characters have different names.

In 2010, science fiction writer Peter Watts published a short story in Clarkesworld Magazine titled "The Things" in which the alien entity from Who Goes There? is the first-person narrator. The characters and events are the same as those in the 1982 John Carpenter adaptation. Clarkesworld also released an audio version of this story as part of their podcast series.

In 2019, Wildside Press published Short Things, a anthology of short stories inspired by Who Goes There? and The Thing. Edited by John Betancourt, Short Things features written contributions by G. D. Falksen ("Appolyon"), Paul Di Filippo ("Thingmaker"), Mark McLaughlin ("The Horror on a Superyacht"), Alan Dean Foster ("Leftovers"), Darrell Schweitzer ("The Interrogator"), Nina Kiriki Hoffman ("Good As Dead"), Kristine Kathryn Rusch ("The Mission, at T-Prime"), Chelsea Quinn Yarbro ("The"), Kevin J. Anderson ("Cold Storage"), Pamela Sargent ("Two Wars"), Allen M. Steele ("According to a Reliable Source"), Allan Cole ("The Monster at World's End"), and Betancourt himself ("The Nature of the Beast"). It also contains illustrations by Dan Brereton, Marc Hempel and Mark Wheatley, among others.

In 2024, Wildside Press published Betancourt's prequel novel, The Things from Another World. Illustrated by Bob Eggleton, it was released after a Kickstarter campaign as "the first in a new trilogy of novels that explore the backstory of the Things and the future of humanity within a galaxy-wide conflict dating back millions of years."

==== Comics ====
In December 1952, EC Comics published an adaptation in Weird Fantasy #16. In 1976, the story was also adapted in Starstream #1 with script by Arnold Drake and art by Jack Abel.

In 1991, Dark Horse Comics published a two-issue miniseries, The Thing from Another World, written by Chuck Pfarrer and illustrated by John Higgins. It was followed in 1992 by a four-issue sequel, The Thing from Another World: Climate of Fear, written by John Arcudi and illustrated by Jim W. Somerville, and then further in 1993 by The Thing from Another World: Eternal Vows, written by Dave de Vries and illustrated by Paul Gulacy. An alternative sequel to the film, The Thing from Another World: Questionable Research, written by Edward Martin III and drawn by Ted Naifeh, was serialised by Dark Horse in 1993. A standalone prequel story, The Thing: The Northman Nightmare, written by Steve Niles and illustrated by Patric Reynolds, was published digitally by Dark Horse in 2011.

=== Audio ===
The story has been adapted as a radio drama multiple times, the earliest was for the Exploring Tomorrow radio series in 1958 (under the title The Escape), hosted by Campbell himself. However, no recordings of this episode are known to exist. Subsequently, the story was adapted as part of the BBC radio drama series Chillers (2002) and the revival of the classic radio drama Suspense (2013).

An audiobook version of Frozen Hell, narrated by Yuri Lowenthal, was released by Wildside Press in 2022.

=== Games ===
In 2002, Universal Interactive and Konami co-published the video game The Thing, a third-person shooter and survival horror sequel to the 1982 film. Rockstar Dundee was working on another video game adaptation of the film but it was cancelled after the studio became part of Rockstar Games in 2020. A remastered version of the 2002 game was developed and published by Nightdive Studios in 2024.

The Thing (2010 card game) and The Thing: Infection at Outpost 31 (2017 board game) are both based on the 1982 film.

Who Goes There?, a board game from Certifiable Studios, was released in 2018, following a Kickstarter campaign, which raised over $612,000 compared to its $54,097 goal. In 2020, Certifiable Studios launched a Kickstarter for a second edition of the game, promising updated mechanics and additional characters. It is available either as a complete game or as an add-on for those who have already bought the first edition.

== Cultural impact ==
=== Literature ===
A. E. van Vogt was inspired by Who Goes There? to write "Vault of the Beast" (1940), which he submitted to Astounding Science Fiction. Van Vogt later recalled: "I read half of it standing there at the news-stand before I bought the issue and finished it. That brought me back into the fold with a vengeance. I still regard that as the best story Campbell ever wrote, and the best horror tale in science fiction."

Jack Finley's 1954 science fiction horror novel The Body Snatchers is considered to be inspired by Campbell's story. It was then itself adapted into films multiple times.

Héctor Germán Oesterheld and Alberto Breccia wrote the comic "Tres ojos" (Spanish: "Three Eyes"), heavily influenced by Who Goes There? and its first cinematic adaptation, for their Sherlock Time series. It was published in Argentinean comics magazine Hora Cero (issues 89–104) from May to August 1959.

The 1981 Doctor Who comic "Skywatch-7" was heavily inspired by Who Goes There?, featuring a Zygon attacking a UNIT base in Antarctica. It was written by Alan McKenzie under the pseudonym "Maxwell Stockbridge".

=== Film and television ===
The film Horror Express (1972) borrows heavily from Campbell's story, but was not an official adaptation nor is Campbell or his story credited in the film. It moves the setting to the Trans-Siberian Railway in the year 1906, where a fossilised hominid that was found buried in the ice is being transported by an archaeologist. After the creature thaws, it comes to life and stalks the passengers on the train. A blood test reveals it to be the host for an alien being that came to Earth in prehistoric times and capable of possessing any living being it comes into contact with. The alien is capable of jumping from person to person as well as absorbing their memories, prompting a search among the train passengers to determine who the alien now is, while it attempts to obtain the knowledge it needs to build a space craft.

The Seeds of Doom, the 1976 serial which concluded the thirteenth season of the science fiction TV series Doctor Who, combined elements from Campbell's original storyline (an expedition in Antarctica unearths an ancient alien specimen that has lain dormant in the ice for thousands of years) with elements of the 1951 film version (the alien is a carnivorous walking vegetable, not a shape-shifting impersonator).

Ridley Scott and Dan O'Bannon partially based their screenplay for Alien (1979) on Who Goes There?. Film critic Roger Ebert noted similarities between Alien and The Thing from Another World.

The 1993 episode "Ice" of The X-Files borrows its premise from the storyline.

The 1993 episode "Aquiel" of Star Trek: The Next Generation contains an isolated space outpost and the murderer is eventually revealed to be a shapeshifting lifeform.

In the 1995 episode "The Adversary" of Star Trek: Deep Space Nine, a shapeshifting alien infiltrates the crew of a starship. The episode explores similar themes of paranoia and contains a "blood test" scene. The writers have cited The Thing from Another World as inspiration.

The 2013 episode "The Thingy!" of the family action-comedy series The Aquabats! Super Show! also borrows the story's premise, albeit in a much more comedic tone.

The 2020 film Friend of the World is influenced by The Thing with themes of body horror and isolation. A title on its soundtrack is named after the novella.

=== Games ===
The story is referenced, and embedded within The Rack of Baal (1985), a 'choose-your-own-adventure' gamebook written by Mark Smith and Jamie Thomson, about a time-travelling special agent called "The Falcon". A section of the plot plays out on a frozen world occupied by a single mining station crewed by only a few people. One inhabitant is called 'Sil McReady', who, in a cynical inversion of the original story, actually turns out to be infected with the alien organism.

The premise of the 2024 survival horror video game Still Wakes the Deep was inspired by Carpenter's film adaptation as well as by Who Goes There? itself. Lead designer Rob McLachlan explained: "A group of professionals, cut off and alone, and facing what feels like an undefeatable enemy, creates just the sort of character drama needed to support the velocity of our story. Paranoia, fear, isolation, and brutal destruction of the human crew are our backdrop."

=== Other ===
All three versions of the film are screened annually in March for the overwinter crew after the last plane departs with the summer crew at the U.S. Amundsen–Scott South Pole Station, and as part of the Midwinter celebrations on the solstice in June at the UK Rothera Research Station. Carpenter himself spoke with the crew at Amundsen-Scott via zoom in 2024 to introduce the movie marathon.

The Thing is one of the aliens featured in Barlowe's Guide to Extraterrestrials (1979; second edition 1987). Barlowe's main illustration depicts the Thing halfway through its transformation into a sled dog. In 2006, Dark Horse Comics released a pre-painted snap together model kit of the alien as described in the original short story. It was sculpted and painted by Andrea Von Sholly. The model was unlicensed and was simply titled 'The Space Thing'.

== See also ==
- At the Mountains of Madness, an Antarctica-set science fiction horror story by H. P. Lovecraft that was also first published in Astounding.
- John Martin Leahy, a pulp writer whose 1928 short story "In Amundsen's Tent" is a precursor to Lovecraft's At the Mountains of Madness and Campbell's Who Goes There?
