= White Fang 2: Myth of the White Wolf =

- Theatrical release poster
- Directed by: Ken Olin
- Written by: David Fallon
- Produced by: Preston Fischer
- Starring: Scott Bairstow; Charmaine Craig; Alfred Molina; Geoffrey Lewis
- Cinematography: Hiro Narita
- Edited by: Elba Sanchez-Short
- Music by: John Debney
- Production company: Walt Disney Pictures
- Distributed by: Buena Vista Pictures Distribution
- Release date: April 14, 1994
- Running time: 102 minutes
- Country: United States
- Language: English
- Box office: $8.9 million

White Fang 2: Myth of the White Wolf is a 1994 American Northern adventure film directed by Ken Olin, and starring Scott Bairstow, Alfred Molina, and Geoffrey Lewis. Based on characters created by Jack London, it is a sequel to the 1991 White Fang. Filming entirely took place in Aspen, Colorado as well as British Columbia, Canada's Metro Vancouver region. Released in theaters by Walt Disney Pictures on April 14, 1994, it was later released on VHS on October 19, 1994, by Walt Disney Home Video.

== Plot ==
Going to San Francisco, Jack Conroy leaves his wolfdog White Fang with his friend, Henry Casey. The two form a bond but find trouble when washed up on shore while sailing to bring their gold into town.

Meanwhile, Native American chief Moses Joseph has a dream about White Fang and his niece Lily. He says that Lily will guide them to find the wolf, whom he believes will help save the starving tribe. Lily sails to the river and hears White Fang barking. She sees White Fang, who disappears. Henry appears in his place, leading Lily to believe that the wolf had changed into Henry. She rescues Henry and brings him back to her home. While making his way through the wilderness to find Henry, White Fang finds a wolf pack and follows it. However, he decides not to join them and continues his journey.

Henry goes back to town and sees many hungry people, and Reverend Leland Drury explains the poor state the town is in. Henry decides to return to the village and gives Lily a white shawl as a gift. That night, as he is with the tribe, Henry hears White Fang howling and reunites with him. That night, Henry has a similar dream to the one Moses had, but this time including Henry himself.

Moses gives Henry a bow and arrows and sends him to the forest to practice his hunting skills. Peter, Moses's son, and Henry practice together. Lily tries to convince her uncle to let her join Henry, but Moses refuses as women don't hunt.

When the time comes, Henry, White Fang, and Peter go into the forest. Lily secretly slips into the forest to join them. After Henry is almost wounded by a trap, Peter is shot at. He tasks Henry to find the caribou and runs to distract a gunman on horseback. Henry and White Fang escape, but his leg gets caught in a snare. He is nearly killed by a man in a hunting blind, but is saved by Lily. She releases him from the trap, and they arrive at the hunting grounds to find the path blocked by a manmade wall so that the caribou herd cannot pass through.

They go to find out who blocked the caribou but fall into a hole, which turns out to be an airshaft to a gold mine. They discover that Reverend Drury is behind the blockade, as he is running an illegal mining operation. They decide to steal dynamite to clear the path, but along the way, Henry spots the Reverend. Henry accosts the Reverend when he threatens one of the Native American miners and the Reverend offers him a cut of the mine's profits if he walks away. Henry refuses and shoots the Reverend in the arm as he and Lily run to escape the mine. Henry finds another airshaft and hoists himself up to get out but Lily is captured by Leland's men. Henry escapes the mine, and White Fang defends him from the remaining miners while he sets the dynamite. The explosion clears the path and frees the caribou.

Meanwhile, the Reverend has loaded the gold and a bound Lily onto a wagon and is making a break for it. Henry and White Fang race through the forest to save Lily. As the wagon speeds past the cliff edge, White Fang and Henry jump onto the wagon. White Fang lunges at Reverend Drury, sending them both tumbling down the cliffside. Henry frees Lily from her bonds, and the Reverend is killed by the stampeding herd.

Henry and Lily retrieve a wounded White Fang and return to the village with him. Lily gives Henry back his gold, which she had found in the remains of his boat. As Henry prepares to leave, the village thanks him for saving them from starvation. Just as he is about to leave, Lily comes running toward him wearing the white shawl he had given her. She says "she chooses" him, and they embrace while White Fang's mate emerges from the trees and joins him. Three months later, White Fang and the female wolf have a litter of pups. Henry and Lily arrive at the den and are greeted warmly by the new family.

== Cast ==
- Scott Bairstow as Henry Casey, Jack Conroy's best friend and White Fang's new caretaker
- Charmaine Craig as Lily Joseph, a Haida princess who thinks she is the human incarnation of the wolf spirit her uncle glimpsed in a dream
- Alfred Molina as Reverend Leland Drury, a religious crook who wants to starve the Haida off their land so he can mine for gold
- Geoffrey Lewis as Mr. Heath, Reverend Leland's sidekick
- Al Harrington as Moses Joseph, Lily's uncle and the chief of the Haidas
- Anthony Michael Ruivivar as Peter Joseph, Lily's cousin and Moses' son
- Matthew Cowles as Lloyd Halverson, a surly trapper
- Victoria Racimo as Katrin Joseph, Lily's aunt
- Ethan Hawke as Jack Conroy, a young prospector who has bequeathed his gold mine and White Fang to Henry Casey
- Paul Coeur as Adam John Hale, a Haida major
- Woodrow W. Morrison as Bad Dog
- Reynold Russ as Leon
- Nathan Young as One-Ear
- Charles Natkong Sr. as Sshaga-Holy Man
- Edward Davis as Sshaga-Apprentice
- Bryon Chief-Moon as Matthew
- Tom Heaton as Miner 1
- Trace Yeomans as Chief's Mother
- Thomas Kitchkeesic as Native Boy
- Jed the Wolfdog as White Fang, Henry Casey's wolfdog companion

== Production ==
Walt Disney Pictures began shooting the film in April 1993. All wild animals in this film were professionally trained by employees of San Bernardino, California's Jungle Exotics. The grizzly bear and white wolf in this film were additionally trained by employees of Vancouver's Creative Animal Talent.

== Reception ==
On the review aggregator website Rotten Tomatoes, White Fang 2 was considered "Fresh", currently holding an approval rating of 71% with an average rating of 6.3/10, based on seven critic reviews. Audiences polled by CinemaScore gave the film an average grade of "A−" on an A+ to F scale.

Roger Ebert gave the film three out of four stars, stating: "What's best about the film is a kind of fresh-air exuberance, an innocence. The adventures in this movie are fun - not frightening, violent, or depressing. The villains are bad, but not subhuman, and at the end I was positively grateful for a scene where the bad guy tries to get away in a wagon full of gold, with the heroine tied up behind him, and Henry and the dog trying to save her. This was so old-fashioned it was almost daring."

Lois Alter Mark of Entertainment Weekly gave the film a B rating, concluding that White Fang 2 would be a better film if the filmmakers gave the "four-legged hero" more screen time. "If only White Fang 2: Myth of the White Wolf had kept the camera on its four-legged hero and let animal trainer Joe Camp (Homeward Bound) work his magic, it too could have been as effective as jujubes in keeping kids glued to their seats."

Robert Faires of The Austin Chronicle gave the film three out of five stars. He also opined that the movie gets better when the animals are on the screen. "It's best when the wolves are moving. Maybe when the third one is made - the final scene screams ‘White Fang: The Next Generation’ - they'll leave the humans out of it and just run with the pack." The Movie Scene also gave the film three out of five stars, stating that White Fang 2 is not a bad film, but it is inferior to its predecessor and that the movie is pleasant for the young audiences, but is not a great entertainment for adult people. "What this all boils down to is that White Fang 2: Myth of the White Wolf is solid entertainment for its intended young audience but offers little for any adult watching it with their kids."

Rita Kempley of The Washington Post didn't like the film. She praised the animals' performances, but criticized the human actors. "The animal actors are superb - you really think White Fang is a goner in a couple of instances - but the humans have basically reached the level of their own incompetence. Perhaps no one in the cast was able to obey Chief Moses Joseph's injunction to set the inner wolf free. The audience, on the other hand, will surely be howling."
