= William Latham (computer scientist) =

British computer artist (born 1961)

William Latham (born 1961) is a British computer artist, most known as the creator of the Organic Art product, as well as for creating album covers and artwork for the dance group The Shamen. Latham is the founder of the company Computer Artworks, which released the Organic Art product through Time Warner Interactive. Latham has authored a book called Evolutionary Art and Computers together with Stephen Todd, published 1992, based on their work at the IBM(UK) Scientific Centre in Winchester, generating 3-d computer models of organic life forms, using genetic algorithm based techniques to mutate base forms into artistic creations. Since 2007, Latham has been Professor of Computing at Goldsmiths, University of London.
