= R. J. MacReady =

Protagonist of The Thing (1982 film)

- The Thing character
- Macready (Kurt Russell) as seen in The Thing
- First appearance: The Thing (1982)
- Last appearance: The Thing (2002)
- Created by: John Carpenter
- Portrayed by: Kurt Russell

In-universe information
- Nickname: Mac
- Gender: Male
- Occupation: Helicopter pilot

R. J. MacReady, also known as Mac, is the protagonist of the 1982 science fiction horror film The Thing. He is portrayed by Kurt Russell.

== Fictional character biography ==
=== Background ===
R. J. MacReady served as a helicopter pilot in the Vietnam War. Later, at some point, he worked for Hughes Aircraft as a test pilot, before resigning after a conflict with the company's management team. MacReady was eventually stationed as the helicopter pilot at U.S Outpost 31 in Antarctica.

In the original story that served as the basis for the film, Who Goes There?, MacReady is instead named McReady and serves as a meteorologist at the station as well as the expedition's second in command, but otherwise maintains a similar role as the later adaptations.

=== The Thing (1982) ===
After a Norwegian helicopter pursuing and firing at an Alaskan Malamute comes across Outpost 31, a misfired grenade destroys the helicopter and kills the pilot. The passenger is killed by station commander Garry and the dog is placed in a kennel.

MacReady investigates the Norwegian base, only to find it annihilated and all researchers deceased. MacReady learns that the Norwegians had dug something out of the ice and finds the burned remains of a monstrous deformed two-headed creature. Returning to their base, they find the malamute, which has turned into a monster, in the process of assimilating the other dogs, leading to Childs torching it with a flamethrower. Blair performs an autopsy on the creature and reveals that the dog had been assimilated by an alien creature capable of absorbing and perfectly imitating other life forms.

MacReady returns to the Norwegian base and discovers that the Norwegian team had uncovered a spacecraft in the ice. While MacReady is away, Bennings is assimilated, and MacReady returns to find Blair has sabotaged the helicopters and tractors, killed the remaining dogs and is demolishing the communications room. MacReady subdues Blair and locks him in the tool shed. The crew becomes increasingly paranoid and discovers that the remaining blood samples had been destroyed and Fuchs had committed suicide before The Thing could assimilate him fully. After recovering Fuchs' body, MacReady is locked outside of the base during a blizzard due to suspicions by Nauls after uncovering a torn piece of his coat in the snow.

MacReady breaks into the storage room and threatens the remaining survivors with dynamite. In the midst of this confrontation, Norris suffers a heart attack. Copper attempts to resuscitate Norris via defibrillation, which causes the Norris-Thing to transform and murder him. After burning the Norris-Thing as it attempts to escape, MacReady is forced to kill Clark who attempts to kill him.

After Clark's death, the rest of the crew agree to MacReady running a blood sample test with a hot wire to see whose blood reacts defensively. The backup pilot Palmer is revealed to have been assimilated and kills Windows before being blown up by MacReady, who then torches Windows' body for safety measures.

Three of the remaining survivors (MacReady, Garry, and Nauls) head to the tool shed to check on Blair to do another blood test, only to find he has escaped and gone underground to construct a small flying vehicle. Childs abandons his post at the main gate and MacReady, Garry, and Nauls begin destroying the facility in an attempt to kill the creature, which leads to Garry and Nauls being murdered by the infected Blair. MacReady faces off against the creature, attacking it with a stick of dynamite then proceeding to detonate the facility. Wandering through the wreckage, MacReady meets up with Childs, who claims to have gotten lost in the storm chasing Blair. MacReady is skeptical, but with no way to check if Childs is human or not, the two acknowledge their futility and share a drink as the cold closes in.

=== Comic books ===
R. J. MacReady's storyline from the end of The Thing (1982) continues in comic book form released on Dark Horse Comics from 1991 to 1994. In the comics, MacReady is eventually rescued by a whaling ship, but steals its onboard helicopter and heads back to the ruined research station, only to be ambushed and briefly taken prisoner by an American Navy SEAL team. It doesn't take long until the team experiences the horror of the Thing themselves and learn that MacReady is not crazy. He comes across Childs, with whom he eventually reaches an Argentinian research station on Tierra del Fuego. There the infections continue to occur at a rapid pace, including in the livestock animals kept by the research team, but Childs seemingly passes a blood test while MacReady appears to have become one of the Things. However, Childs eventually reveals himself to be indeed a Thing himself, having successfully tampered with the blood test, including using an ashtray that was already contaminated while testing MacReady. He remembers that while Childs tested himself, he was in contact with his own blood sample and was thus able to manipulate it to appear untainted. MacReady comes across and is nearly killed by a "Mega-Thing", a composite of all the infected humans and animals at the Argentinian base, but American bomber-jets arrives in the nick of time and napalm-bombs the monster, destroying it. Eventually MacReady follows the trail of the Thing to a fictional town called Wallace Harbour on Stewart Island, New Zealand, where the infections has arrived via journeying sealife. MacReady continues to fight the infected organisms until at last he falls down from exhaustion and sleep deprivation on a shore on the island, muttering "still so much to do" as he collapses, leaving him at a cliffhanger ending.

=== The Thing (2002 video game) ===
MacReady returns in the 2002 video game sequel to The Thing to assist the U.S. Rescue Team investigating Outpost 31 in destroying The Thing. MacReady's survival is never explained, though the game is set 3 months after the events at Outpost 31. MacReady has also gotten access to a new working helicopter. One interpretation is that MacReady was captured by bio-technology research company Gen Inc and held as a potential test subject only to escape and steal one of their helicopters. The character appears in the final scene, revealing his identity to Captain Blake and flying his helicopter into the Antarctic horizon.

== Production and development ==
Despite being involved in the production before casting, Kurt Russell was the last person to be cast in the film. By the time Russell was cast, second unit filming had already begun. MacReady was designed to have been modernized for the contemporary audiences. Screenwriter Bill Lancaster had originally aimed for The Thing to have been an ensemble piece where one person eventually emerged as the protagonist, rather than having a "Doc Savage type hero" from the start. Lancaster's original screenplay had both MacReady and Childs being assimilated in the ending, but director John Carpenter believed the ending to be "too shallow". Actors Tom Atkins and Jack Thompson were strong contenders for the role of MacReady before Russell was cast. Christopher Walken, Jeff Bridges and Nick Nolte were all approached by the studio, but were unavailable. Sam Shepard showed interest in the role but was never considered.

== Reception and legacy ==
Kurt Russell's portrayal of MacReady in the film was largely acclaimed by fans and critics. CBR listed MacReady as the 7th most groundbreaking John Carpenter character, citing Russell's performance as one of the primary reasons the film has returned to public consciousness after the negative initial reception the film received when it was first released.

MacReady and Childs' fate at the end of the film has also been subject to many interpretations. One popular interpretation is that Childs is The Thing, and MacReady is aware of this. When the two of them share a drink, MacReady had given Childs one of the bottles of gasoline he was using for Molotov Cocktails as seen earlier in the film. MacReady is testing Childs and if he drinks the gasoline with no reaction, he is a Thing.

In April 2023, it was announced that The Thing and characters from the film would be featured in the video game Funko Fusion, which released in 2024. The game includes R. J. MacReady, as well as Childs and Dr. Copper.

In November 2023, it was announced that The Thing would be featured in the video game, Pinball M. The Thing Pinball, a table based on the film, was released on November 30, 2023. The table includes R. J. MacReady and various other elements from the film.
