= The Journey of Natty Gann =

1985 film by Jeremy Kagan

- Theatrical release poster
- Directed by: Jeremy Kagan
- Written by: Jeanne Rosenberg
- Produced by: Mike Lobell
- Starring: Meredith Salenger; John Cusack; Ray Wise
- Cinematography: Dick Bush
- Edited by: David Holden
- Music by: James Horner
- Production companies: Walt Disney Pictures; Silver Screen Partners II
- Distributed by: Buena Vista Distribution
- Release date: September 27, 1985
- Running time: 101 minutes
- Country: United States
- Language: English
- Budget: $8 million
- Box office: $9.7 million (U.S. and Canada only)

The Journey of Natty Gann is a 1985 American coming-of-age adventure film directed by Jeremy Paul Kagan, produced by Walt Disney Pictures and released by Buena Vista Distribution on September 27, 1985. The film's cast included Meredith Salenger (in her first role), John Cusack, Scatman Crothers, Lainie Kazan, and Ray Wise.

== Plot ==
In 1935, teenage tomboy Natty Gann lives in Chicago with her unemployed widowed father, Sol. After being out of work because of the Great Depression, Sol applies for work as a lumberjack in Washington. However, to take the job, he must leave on almost no notice on a company bus. Unable to find Natty before departing, he leaves her a letter promising to send her the fare to join him as soon as he gets the first pay packet from his new job. Meanwhile, he makes arrangements with Connie, the shallow and insensitive innkeeper of their rooming-house, for Natty to stay on in the rooming-house under Connie's temporary supervision.

After overhearing Connie reporting her as an abandoned child, Natty runs away to find her father on her own, embarking on a cross-country journey riding the rails along with other penniless travelers and hobos. Along the way, she saves a wolf from a dog fighting ring. In return the animal, whom she calls Wolf, becomes her friend and protector in her attempt to return to her father. She has a brief, innocent romance with another young traveler, Harry, and encounters various obstacles that test her courage, perseverance, and ingenuity, such as being arrested after cattle rustling and remanded to a juvenile facility.

Natty manages to escape the detention center and confronts Charlie, the blacksmith who has been given control of the captured Wolf. Charlie turns out to be kind and fair-minded; he gives back Wolf as well as cooking her a meal. Charlie also gives Natty enough money for a train ticket. She is cheated of her ticket money by an unscrupulous ticket agent, and narrowly escapes his attempt to turn her in, returning to "riding the rails" illicitly on freight trains, where she is unexpectedly reunited with Harry in a rail-side shantytown.

When Natty's father calls the rooming-house innkeeper, Connie tells him Natty is gone. In a later phone call, he is grieved to learn that Natty's wallet was found underneath a derailed freight train — unbeknownst to him, she survived the crash. He is given a week's leave from the lumber company to search through the wreckage for her, but to no avail. He returns to the lumber camp and requests the most dangerous jobs, known as "widow's work", now that he seems to have little to live for.

Arriving on the west coast, Natty's journey takes several more challenging turns. Harry finds work through the federal Works Progress Administration in San Francisco, but she declines his invitation to go with him, preferring to find her father.

The logging operation does not list Sol Gann among their workers, but Natty is undeterred, searching fruitlessly for him by showing other loggers his photo in a pendant he has given her which is her last trace of her parents.

Wolf hears the calls of other wolves nearby, and Natty tearfully tells him to go join his own kind.

The company clerk catches her in one of the backwoods camps and makes arrangements for her to be sent back down the mountain for her own safety. The clerk then unexpectedly finds the returned letter her father had sent enclosing her train ticket to rejoin him and tells Natty of his location. Natty sets out on foot and sees a company truck pass by, loaded with injured men. In the truck, she glimpses her father.

She runs after it, calling out for him, but is eventually devastated when it outpaces her. She hears his voice call out for her and finds him standing in the road. Natty and her father then share an emotional embrace, with Wolf looking on from a nearby cliff.

== Cast ==
- Meredith Salenger as Natty Gann
- John Cusack as Harry
- Ray Wise as Sol Gann
- Lainie Kazan as Connie
- Scatman Crothers as Sherman
- Barry Miller as Parker
- Verna Bloom as Farm Woman
- John Finnegan as Logging Boss
- Garry Chalk as Chicago Worker
- Frank C. Turner as Farmer
- Gabrielle Rose as Exercise Matron
- Don S. Davis as Railroad Brakeman
- Alek Diakun as Station Master
- Grant Heslov as member of Parker's Gang
- Bruce M. Fischer as Charlie Linfield
- Jack Rader as Employment Agent
- Matthew Faison as Buzz
- Jordan Pratt as Frank
- Zachary Ansley as Louie
- Campbell Lane as Chicago Moderator
- Max Trumpower as Chicago Worker
- Douglas Podzun as Dog Fight Spectator
- Jed the Wolfdog as Wolf

== Music ==
Elmer Bernstein originally scored the picture, having to rewrite much of his material in the process; ultimately most of his music was replaced with a new score by James Horner. Both scores were released on compact disc – Bernstein's in 2008 as part of a four-disc set of rejected scores by Varèse Sarabande (also including Gangs of New York and The Scarlet Letter) and Horner's in 2009 by Intrada Records.

== Reception ==
The film has received positive reviews. Review aggregator Rotten Tomatoes gave the film a rating of 91%, based on 32 reviews, with a rating average of 7.13/10. Critics praised the actors' performances and the film's portrayal of Depression-era life, while occasionally lamenting its pace and level of sentimentality.

== Awards and nominations ==
At the Young Artist Awards, Salenger won for Best Leading Young Actress in a Feature Film, and the film itself was nominated for Best Family Motion Picture (Drama). Albert Wolsky received an Academy Award nomination for Best Costume Design.

== Home media ==
The film has been released in the United States on VHS in April 1986, then again in 2002. The DVD version was released using the pan and scan format. The title was also made available for streaming and download in SD and HD versions (without pan and scan). It was released on Blu-Ray as part of Disney's Movie Club on July 17, 2018.
