= Thwing =

Thwing may refer to:

== Places ==
- Thwing, East Riding of Yorkshire, English village, United Kingdom

== People ==
- Alfred L. Thwing (1876–1945), American lawyer and politician
- Annie Haven Thwing, (1851–1940), American historian and children's author
- Charles Franklin Thwing, (1853–1937), American clergyman and educator
- Edward Thwing (1635–1600), English Catholic priest and martyr
- Thomas Thwing, (1635–1680), English Catholic priest and martyr
- John Twenge, (1319–1379), sometimes called John Thwing

== See also ==
- Thing (disambiguation)
- Thring, a surname
- Twing
