= Thing (The Thing) =

- Who Goes There? character
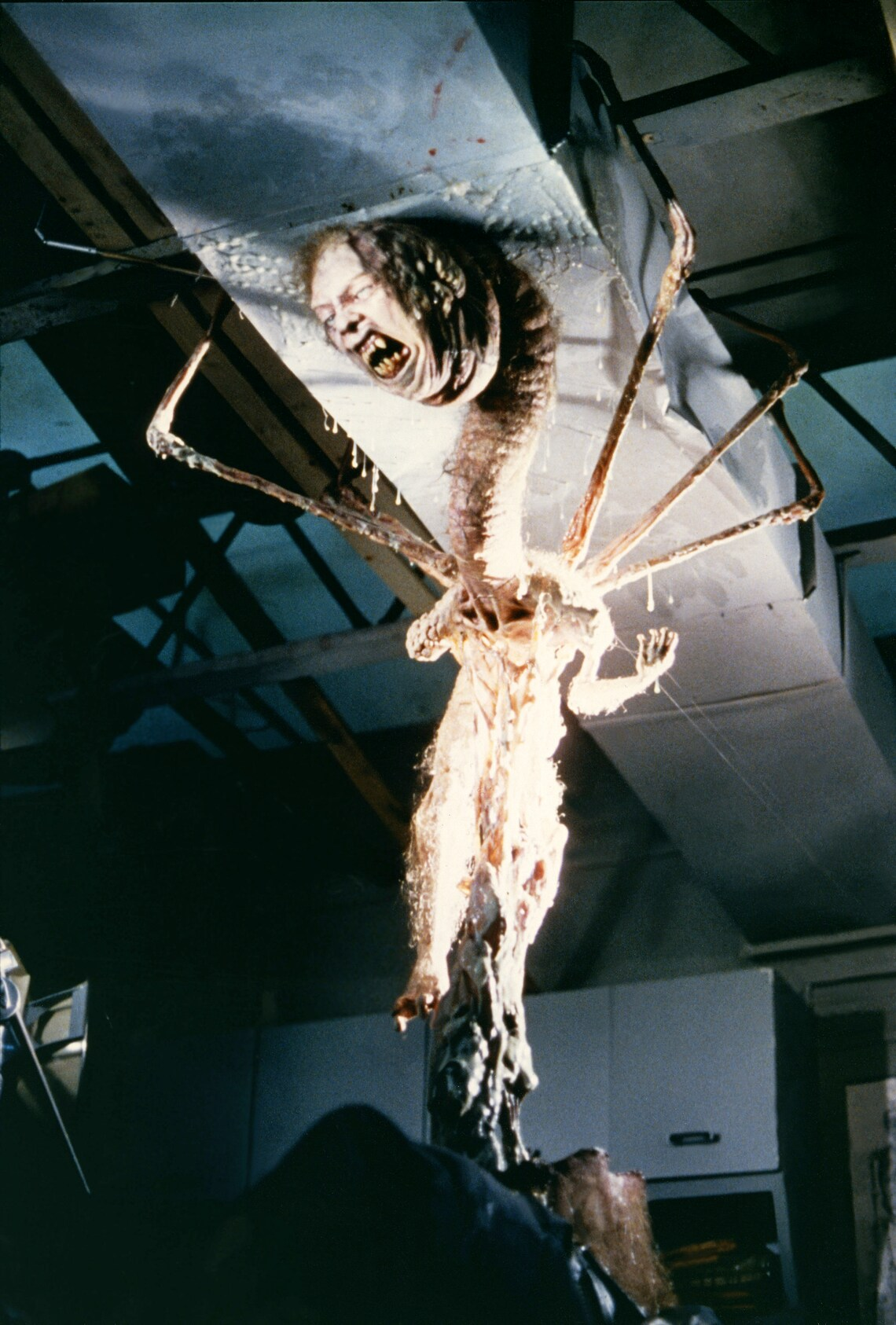
- The Thing in a publicity photo of the 1982 film
- First appearance: Who Goes There?; August 1938
- Last appearance: The Thing; October 2011
- Created by: John W. Campbell
- Portrayed by: James Arness (1951); Jed (1982); Peter Maloney (1982); Charles Hallahan (1982); David Clennon (1982); Wilford Brimley (1982); Paul Braunstein (2011); Kim Bubbs (2011); Trond Espen Seim (2011); Kristofer Hivju (2011); Joel Edgerton (2011)
- Stunt performer: Anthony Cecere (1982)

The Thing is a fictional shapeshifting and telepathic alien and a science fiction antagonist. It first appeared in the novella Who Goes There? by John W. Campbell, which has been adapted into various media, including films, literature, and video games.

== Fictional character biography ==
In Who Goes There?, the Thing is discovered by a team of Antarctic scientists frozen in its spaceship, which had crashed on Earth 20 million years before. After it thaws, it kills and takes the form of the team's physicist, Connant, unbeknownst to the others. It uses its leftover body mass to transform into a sled dog. The team discovers the dog-Thing and kill it as it is transforming. The pathologist of the crew, Blair, goes insane with guilt as he was the one who had lobbied to thaw the Thing. He vows to kill everyone at the research station in order to save mankind from the Thing, and is locked in a cabin. The crew destroy their vehicles in order to isolate the base, but pretend that everything is fine in radio transmissions in order to prevent rescue attempts.

The crew attempts to discover who among them may have been assimilated and replaced by the Thing in order to kill the imitations before they escape. In a blood test, they discover that either Doctor Copper or commander Gary is an imitation, but the result is inconclusive. Assistant commander McReady (known as R. J. MacReady in the 1982 film) takes over the crew and determines that all the animals at the station, except for the dog used for the blood test, have become imitations. As such, the crew kills all of them and burns their bodies.

By this point, the entire crew suspects one another, and the men begin to go mad wondering if they are the last human left, or if they would be able to tell if they were themselves not human. After the cook, Kinner, is murdered and revealed to be the Thing, McReady discovers that every part of the Thing functions as an individual organism. He then uses this fact to test each surviving crew member by dipping a hot wire into samples of their blood. When a blood sample recoils from the heat, the owner is instantly killed. Fourteen crew members are revealed to be the Thing and are killed. The remaining men go to test Blair, who is still isolated in the cabin, and discover that he had already been converted. After McReady destroys the Thing with a blowtorch, it is revealed that it had almost completed building a nuclear-powered anti-gravity device that would have allowed it to escape to the outside world.

== Production history ==
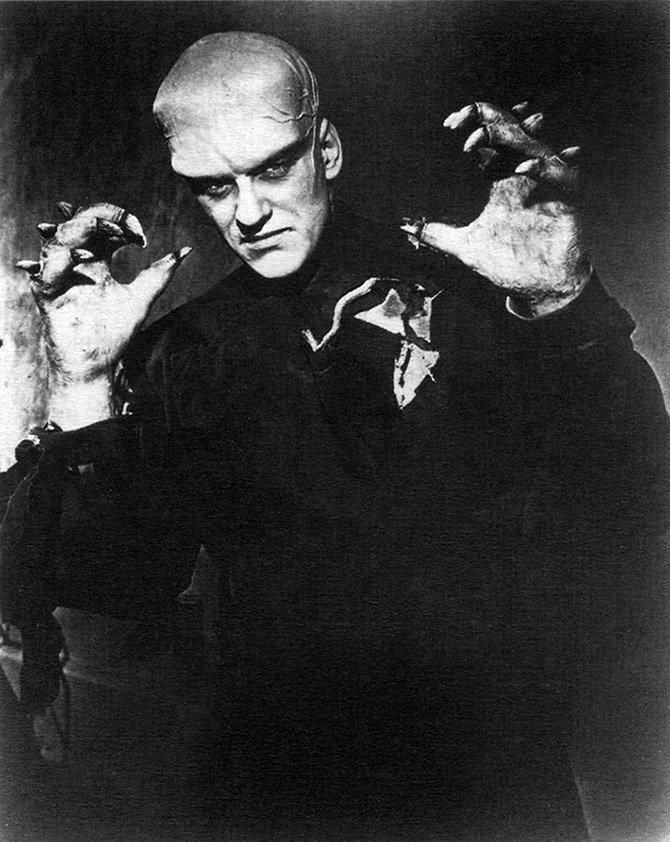
James Arness as the Thing in The Thing from Another World

In 1951, The Thing from Another World was released as an adaptation of the story. James Arness portrays the Thing, which in this version is a humanoid plant-based organism that feeds on animal blood. The Thing was portrayed in a costume.

In 1982's The Thing by John Carpenter, $200,000 of the budget was originally dedicated to creature effects, which at the time was more than Universal Pictures had ever allocated to a monster film. After designs for the creature were completed, the film's crew estimated that they would need around $750,000 for the effects, which Universal agreed to. The effects were designed by Rob Bottin, except for the Thing's dog form, which was designed by Stan Winston.

In 2011, a prequel to the 1982 film was released, directed by Matthijs van Heijningen Jr. The creature effects were initially created using a hybrid of computer-generated and practical effects, though most of the practical effects were replaced with CGI during production.

== Character symbolism ==
In the 1951 film, the Thing has been considered symbolic of the threat of communism during the Cold War. In the 1982 film, the Thing sows distrust among the crew members, representing anti-communist paranoia and the Red Scares.

== Reception ==
In 1982, Cinefantastique described the titular alien in John Carpenter's The Thing as "the most unloved monster in movie history", writing that the creature was disliked by critics, filmgoers, and the makeup union. Despite this negative reception, the Thing's portrayal with practical effects was praised as technically brilliant in contemporary reviews. The 2011 film also received a negative response, with IGN comparing the film to the alien itself, calling it "an insidious, defective mimic of the real, er, thing". In particular, the creature's computer-generated depiction was compared negatively to the 1982 film's practical effects.

== See also ==
- List of horror film villains
