= The Thing from Another World =

1951 science fiction film

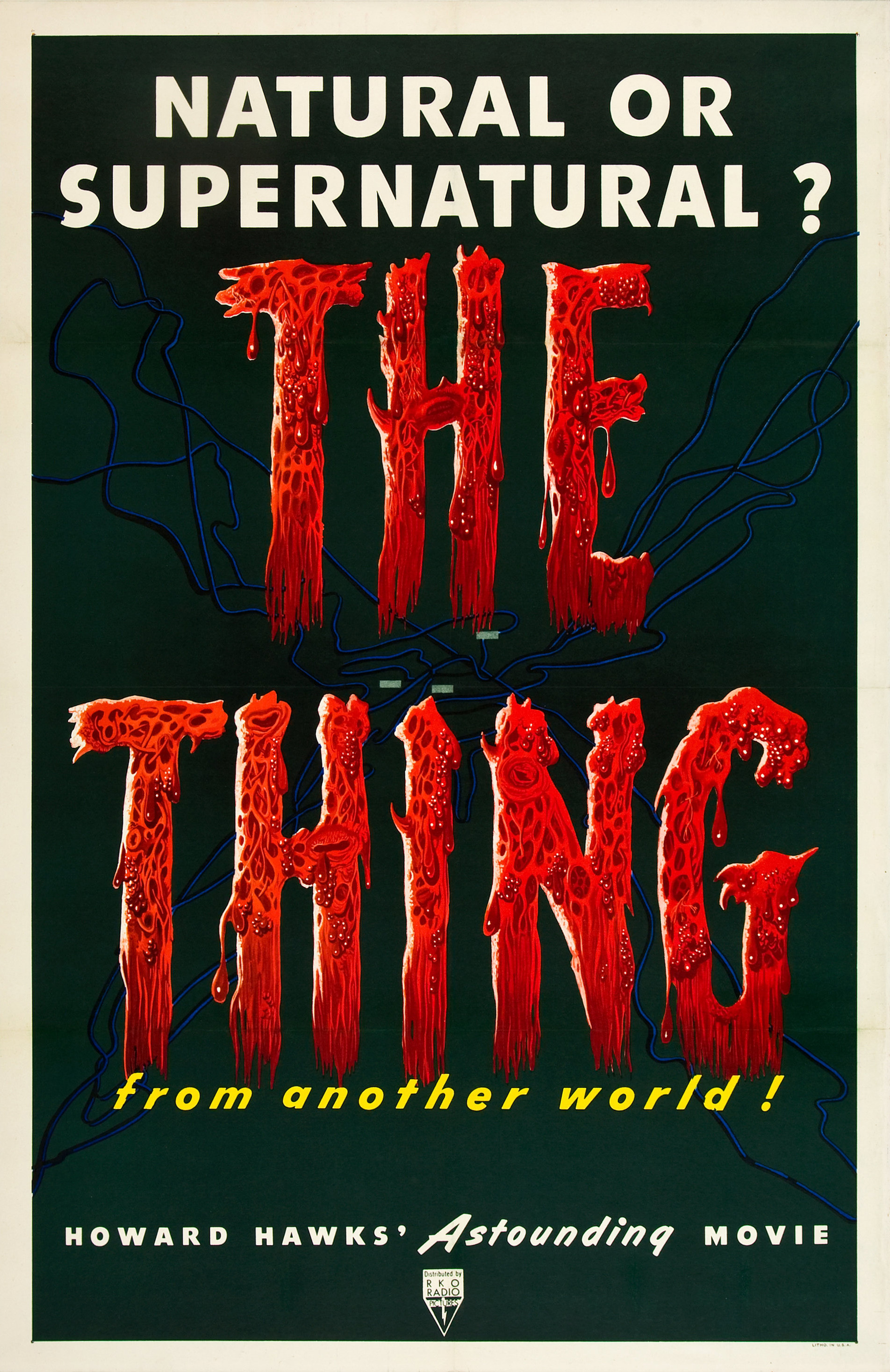
- Theatrical release poster
- Directed by: Christian Nyby (Note: See section #Director for details on Howard Hawks' disputed involvement as director.)
- Screenplay by: Charles Lederer; Uncredited: Howard Hawks; Ben Hecht
- Based on: "Who Goes There?"; 1938 novella; by John W. Campbell Jr.
- Produced by: Edward Lasker; Howard Hawks
- Starring: Margaret Sheridan; Kenneth Tobey; Robert Cornthwaite; Douglas Spencer; James Young; Dewey Martin; Robert Nichols; James Arness
- Cinematography: Russell Harlan, ASC
- Edited by: Roland Gross
- Music by: Dimitri Tiomkin
- Production company: Winchester Pictures Corporation
- Distributed by: RKO Radio Pictures
- Release date: April 7, 1951 (US)
- Running time: 87 minutes
- Country: United States
- Language: English
- Box office: $1.95 million (US rentals)

The Thing from Another World, sometimes referred to as just The Thing, is a 1951 American black-and-white science fiction horror film directed by Christian Nyby, produced by Edward Lasker for Howard Hawks' Winchester Pictures Corporation, and released by RKO Radio Pictures. The film stars Margaret Sheridan, Kenneth Tobey, Robert Cornthwaite, and Douglas Spencer. James Arness plays The Thing. The Thing from Another World is based on the 1938 novella Who Goes There? by John W. Campbell Jr. (writing under the pseudonym of Don A. Stuart).

The film's storyline concerns a United States Air Force crew and scientists who find a crashed flying saucer frozen in the Arctic ice and a humanoid body nearby. Returning to their remote arctic research outpost with the body still in a block of ice, they are forced to defend themselves against the still alive and malevolent plant-based alien when it is accidentally thawed out.

In 2001, the film was selected for preservation in the United States National Film Registry by the Library of Congress as being "culturally, historically or aesthetically significant."

== Plot ==
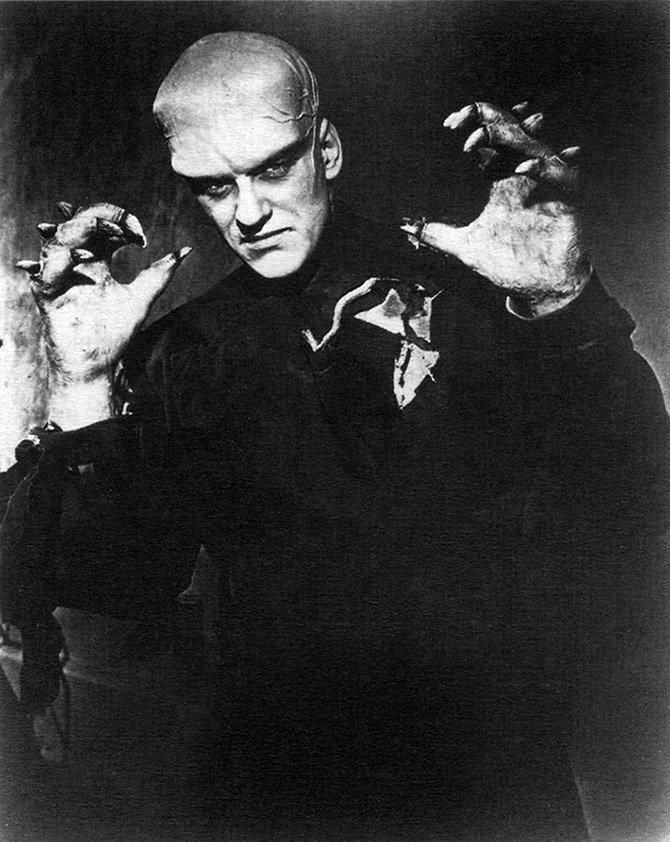
James Arness as The Thing

In Anchorage, journalist Ned Scott, looking for a story, visits the officer's club of the Alaskan Air Command, where he meets Captain Pat Hendry, his co-pilot and flight navigator. General Fogarty orders Hendry to fly to Polar Expedition Six at the North Pole, per a request from its lead scientist, Nobel laureate Dr. Arthur Carrington; Carrington has radioed that an unusual object has crashed nearby. With Scott, Corporal Barnes, crew chief Bob, and a pack of sled dogs, Hendry pilots a Douglas C-47 Skytrain transport aircraft to the remote outpost.

Upon arrival, Scott and the airmen meet radio operator Tex, and the scientists. Hendry later rekindles his romance with Nikki Nicholson, Carrington's secretary. Several scientists fly with the airmen to the crash site, finding a large object buried beneath the ice. As they spread out to determine the object's shape, they realize that they are outlining a flying saucer. The team attempts to free it from the ice with thermite, but a violent reaction with the craft's metal alloy completely destroys it. Their Geiger counter, however, detects something buried nearby in the ice. A frozen body, it is excavated intact in a large block and flown back to the base as an Arctic storm closes in.

Given the discovery, Hendry assumes command of the outpost and, pending radio instructions from General Fogarty, denies Scott permission to send out his story and refuses the scientists' demands to examine the body. Tex sends an update to Fogarty, and the airmen settle for the storm. A watch is posted; relieving the first shift, Barnes is disturbed by the creature's glare through the clearing ice and covers it with an electric blanket he believes is turned off. The block slowly thaws and the creature emerges, threatens Barnes, then proves immune to several gunshots. Escaping into the storm, it fights with the sled dogs, kills two, but loses most of its right forearm.

An airman recovers the stump after the attack and the scientists examine its tissue, concluding that the creature is an advanced form of plant life. Carrington is convinced of its superiority to humans and becomes intent on communicating with it. The airmen begin a search, which leads to the outpost's greenhouse. Carrington stays behind with other scientists, having noticed evidence of alien activity there. They discover a hidden third sled dog, which had been bled dry, revealing the creature as a vampire that feeds on blood. Carrington and the scientists post a secret watch of their own, hoping to encounter it before the airmen do.

The next morning, the airmen continue their search. Tex informs them that Fogarty is aware of their discovery and demands further information, prevented from reaching him by the fierce storm. A scientist appears, badly injured, and tells the group that the creature has killed and bled two colleagues. When the airmen investigate, they are attacked, but manage to barricade the creature inside the greenhouse. Hendry confronts Carrington and orders him to remain in his lab and quarters.

Carrington, obsessed with the creature, shows several other scientists that he has been growing small alien plants from seeds taken from the severed arm and feeding them with blood plasma pilfered from the base’s supply. Hendry learns the entire stock is missing, which leads him to Carrington. Fogarty transmits orders to keep the creature alive, but it escapes from the greenhouse and attacks the airmen in their quarters. They douse it with kerosene and set it aflame, forcing it to flee. After regrouping, they realize the creature has sabotaged the base furnaces’ oil supply, plummeting indoor temperatures the −60 °F (−51 °C) storm. They retreat to the station's generator room to keep warm, and rig a high-voltage electrical trap. The creature appears. Carrington pleads with it, but is knocked violently aside, and the creature is electrocuted. On Hendry's order, it is reduced to a pile of ash.

When the weather clears, Hendry and Nicholson are careening toward marriage, and Scotty is finally able to radio his story of a lifetime to a roomful of reporters in Anchorage. He ends his broadcast with the warning: "Tell the world. Tell this to everybody, wherever they are. Watch the skies everywhere. Keep looking. Keep watching the skies...".

== Cast ==
- Margaret Sheridan as Nikki Nicholson
- Kenneth Tobey as Captain Patrick Hendry
- Robert Cornthwaite as Dr. Arthur Carrington
- Douglas Spencer as Ned "Scotty" Scott
- James Young as Lieutenant Eddie Dykes
- Dewey Martin as Bob, The Crew Chief
- Robert Nichols as Lieutenant Ken "Mac" MacPherson
- William Self as Corporal Barnes
- Eduard Franz as Dr. Stern
- Sally Creighton as Mrs. Chapman
- James Arness as The Thing

== Production ==
In 1950, Lederer and Hecht convinced Hawks to buy the rights to Who Goes There?, who did so for $1,250.

In an unusual practice for the era, no actors are named during the film's dramatic opening title sequence; cast credits appear at the end of the film. Overlapping dialogue is used in the film to add realism, which proved challenging to master.

The film was partly shot in Glacier National Park, with interior sets built at a Los Angeles ice storage plant.

The scene where the alien is set aflame and repeatedly doused with kerosene was one of the first full-body fire stunts filmed.

=== Screenplay ===
The film was loosely adapted by Charles Lederer, with uncredited rewrites from Howard Hawks and Ben Hecht, from the 1938 novella "Who Goes There?" by John W. Campbell. The story was first published in Astounding Science Fiction under the pseudonym, Don A. Stuart, as Campbell had just become Astounding's managing editor. Author A. E. van Vogt, a prolific contributor to Astounding who had been inspired to take up writing science fiction by reading "Who Goes There?", had wanted to write the script.

The screenplay changes the fundamental nature of the alien from Campbell's novella as a life form capable of assuming the physical and mental characteristics of any living thing it encounters (as realized in John Carpenter's 1982 adaptation of the original source, The Thing.) into a humanoid life form with a vegetable cellular structure which must feed on blood to survive. The plant-like internal structure of the creature makes it impervious to bullets, but not to other forces destructive to life such as fire and electricity.

Film critic Bill Warren has argued that the film reflects a post-Hiroshima skepticism about science and prevailing negative views toward scientists who meddle with things better left alone. This suspicion of science is a recurring theme in horror works, including the source material for the film, "Who Goes There" (1938), and other notable works like H.P. Lovecraft's "At the Mountains of Madness" (1936), as well as older novels such as Frankenstein (1818) and The Island of Doctor Moreau (1896).

=== Director ===
There is debate as to whether the film was directed by Howard Hawks for Hawks' own Winchester Pictures, which released the film through RKO Radio Pictures Inc., with Christian Nyby receiving the credit so that Nyby could obtain his Director's Guild membership, or whether Nyby directed it with considerable input from Hawks. Hawks gave Nyby only $5,460 of RKO's $50,000 director's fee and kept the rest, but Hawks always denied that he directed the film.

Cast members disagree on Hawks' and Nyby's contributions: Tobey said that "Hawks directed it, all except one scene" while Fenneman maintained that "Hawks would once in a while direct, if he had an idea, but it was Chris' show". Cornthwaite said that "Chris always deferred to Hawks ... Maybe because he did defer to him, people misinterpreted it."

One of the film's stars, William Self, later became President of 20th Century Fox Television. In describing the production, Self said, "Chris was the director in our eyes, but Howard was the boss in our eyes." Although Self has said that "Hawks was directing the picture from the sidelines", he also has said that "Chris would stage each scene, how to play it. But then he would go over to Howard and ask him for advice, which the actors did not hear ... Even though I was there every day, I don't think any of us can answer the question. Only Chris and Howard can answer the question."

At a reunion of The Thing cast and crew members in 1982, Nyby said:

Did Hawks direct it? That's one of the most inane and ridiculous questions I've ever heard, and people keep asking. That it was Hawks' style. Of course it was. This is a man I studied and wanted to be like. You would certainly emulate and copy the master you're sitting under, which I did. Anyway, if you're taking painting lessons from Rembrandt, you don't take the brush out of the master's hands.

== Reception ==
=== Box office ===
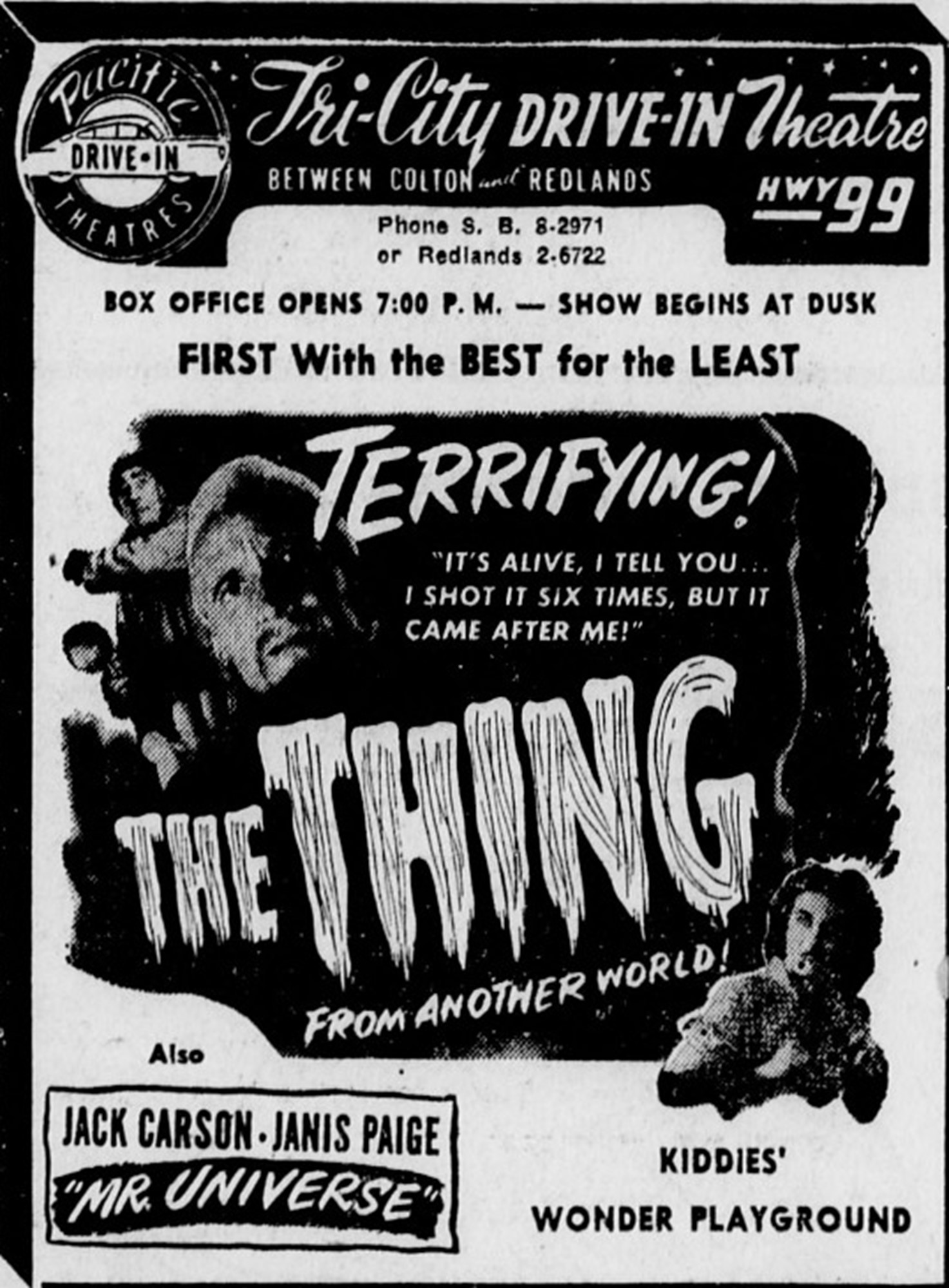
Drive-in advertisement from 1951

The Thing from Another World was released in April 1951. By the end of that year, the film had accrued $1,950,000 in distributors' domestic (U.S. and Canada) rentals, making it the year's 46th biggest earner, beating all other science fiction films released that year, including The Day the Earth Stood Still and When Worlds Collide.

=== Critical response ===
Bosley Crowther in The New York Times observed, "Taking a fantastic notion (or is it, really?), Mr. Hawks has developed a movie that is generous with thrills and chills…Adults and children can have a lot of old-fashioned movie fun at 'The Thing', but parents should understand their children and think twice before letting them see this film if their emotions are not properly conditioned". "Gene" in Variety complained that the film "lacks genuine entertainment values". In 1973, science fiction editor and publisher Lester del Rey compared the film unfavorably to the source material, calling it "just another monster epic, totally lacking in the force and tension of the original story". Isaac Asimov thought it to be one of the worst movies he had ever seen. For his part, Campbell acknowledged that an adaptation would have to change elements from the original, which he considered too scary for most audience members, and hoped that at least the movie would succeed in getting people interested in science fiction.

The film is now considered to be one of the best films of 1951 and one of the great science fiction films of the 1950s. It garnered an 87% "Fresh" rating at the film review aggregator website Rotten Tomatoes from 69 reviews as of October 2025, with the consensus that the film "is better than most flying saucer movies, thanks to well-drawn characters and concise, tense plotting". Additionally, Time magazine named The Thing from Another World "the greatest 1950s sci-fi movie".

== Recognition ==
American Film Institute lists

- AFI's 100 Years...100 Thrills – #87

== Related productions ==
- In 1972, director Eugenio Martín and producer Bernard Gordon made Horror Express, a Spanish-British co-production that serves as a second, looser adaptation of Campbell's novella.
- In 1982, John Carpenter adapted the original novella as The Thing. In 1980, Fantasy Newsletter had reported that Wilbur Stark had bought the rights to several old RKO Pictures fantasy films, intending to remake them, and suggested the most significant of these purchases was The Thing from Another World. This soon led to the making of a more faithful, though initially poorly received, adaptation of Campbell's story, directed by Carpenter, released in 1982 as The Thing, with Stark as executive producer. It paid homage to the 1951 film by using the same "slow burning letters through background" opening title sequence. Carpenter's earlier film, Halloween (1978), also paid homage when the protagonist is shown watching The Thing from Another World on television.
- In 1989, Turner Home Entertainment released a colorized version of the original film on VHS, billed as an "RKO Color Classic".

== See also ==
- 1951 in film
- List of films featuring extraterrestrials
