= Matthijs van Heijningen Jr. =

Dutch filmmaker, writer and producer (born 1965)

- Born: 26 July 1965 (age 60); Amsterdam, Netherlands
- Occupations: Director, producer, writer
- Years active: 1983–present

Matthijs van Heijningen Jr. (Dutch pronunciation: [mɑˈtɛis fɑn ˈɦɛinɪŋə(n)]; (Note: In isolation, van is pronounced [vɑn].) born 26 July 1965) is a Dutch director, writer and producer best known for directing The Thing (2011).

== Career ==
Matthijs van Heijningen Jr. began directing at an early age with promotional trailers for Toyota, Peugeot, Renault, Stella Artois, Pepsi, and Bud Light.

In 1996, van Heijningen made his film directing debut with the Dutch short-film thriller Red Rain. In 2011, he directed The Thing, a prequel to John Carpenter's The Thing. Van Heijningen was due to direct Army of the Dead, but the project ended up being directed by Zack Snyder after lingering in development hell for a number of years.

In 2020, van Heijningen directed his second feature The Forgotten Battle, a Netflix original war film depicting the Battle of the Scheldt. Netflix's first ever original Dutch film.

== Filmography ==
Director

Year	Title	Director	Writer	Producer
1996	Red Rain (short film)	Yes	Yes	Yes
2011	The Thing	Yes	No	No
2020	The Forgotten Battle	Yes	Yes	No
2024	De Joodse Raad (miniseries)	Yes	No	Yes

Producer

- Dada (1994)
- Witness (1994)
- En Route (1994)

Other credits

Year	Title	Role
1983	De Lift	Set Decorator
1984	Ciske de Rat	Assistant lighting technician
1991	Saudade	Cinematographer
1992	Voor een verloren soldaat	Assistant editor

== Personal life ==
He is the son of Dutch film producer Matthijs van Heijningen.

He lives in the Leidsebuurt in Amsterdam.
