= Wellwood (film) =

American science-fiction film

- Directed by: Eliza Hooper
- Written by: Reid Collums
- Produced by: Tiana Armstrong; Alec Gillis; Aaron Kybartas; Tom Woodruff Jr.
- Starring: Keisha Castle-Hughes; Lance E. Nichols; Camille Balsamo; Siena D'Addario
- Production company: Amalgamated Dynamics
- Release date: March 24, 2025
- Country: United States
- Language: English

Wellwood is a 2025 science fiction film directed by Eliza Hooper.

== Premise ==
The film centers around a married couple Laura and Nick. Laura is diagnosed with terminal illness. Nick makes an extraterrestrial discovery that he decides will cure his wife.

== Cast ==
- Keisha Castle-Hughes as Deputy Gracie Marsh
- Lance E. Nichols as Sheriff Bradley
- Camielle Balsamo as Laura Harper
- Sienna D'Addario as Victoria
- Reid Collums as Nick Harper

== Production ==
The film began production in early 2018 in New Orleans. The film is directed by Eliza Hooper with the film being Hooper's first major project as director. The film hails from Amalgamated Dynamics based in Southern California. Tiana Armstrong, Alec Gillis, Aaron Kybartas and Tom Woodruff Jr. served as executive producers. The film was edited by Matthew Ellena. Music for the film comes from American composer/singer-songwriter Xander Singh. Cinematographer Daniel Kenji Levin oversaw the film's cinematography and sound mixers Bryn Scott Hubbard and Devin Lawrence as well as foley artist Reece Miller comprised the film's sound department.
