= Godzilla: King of the Monsters (2019 film) =

2019 American film by Michael Dougherty

- Theatrical release poster
- Directed by: Michael Dougherty
- Screenplay by: Michael Dougherty; Zach Shields
- Story by: Max Borenstein; Michael Dougherty; Zach Shields
- Based on: Godzilla, King Ghidorah, Mothra and Rodan by Toho Co., Ltd.
- Produced by: Mary Parent; Alex Garcia; Thomas Tull; Jon Jashni; Brian Rogers
- Starring: Kyle Chandler; Vera Farmiga; Millie Bobby Brown; Bradley Whitford; Sally Hawkins; Charles Dance; Thomas Middleditch; Aisha Hinds; O'Shea Jackson Jr.; David Strathairn; Ken Watanabe; Zhang Ziyi
- Cinematography: Lawrence Sher
- Edited by: Roger Barton; Richard Pearson; Bob Ducsay
- Music by: Bear McCreary
- Production company: Legendary Pictures (Note: The final billing credits reflect that the film is the sole production of Legendary; Toho Co., Ltd. and Huahua Media are given an "in association with" credit. However, secondary sources credit Toho and Wanda Qingdao Studios as part of the production companies. The latter is a filming facility and not a production company. Additionally, Godzilla: King of the Monsters was filmed in Atlanta and parts of Mexico, not in Qingdao where Wanda Qingdao Studios is based.)
- Distributed by: Warner Bros. Pictures (Worldwide); Toho Co., Ltd. (Japan)
- Release dates: May 13, 2019 (Beijing); May 31, 2019 (United States)
- Running time: 131 minutes
- Country: United States (Note: Several secondary sources name Japan and China as the countries that co-produced the film due to involvement from Japanese studio Toho Co., Ltd. and Chinese companies Huahua Media and Wanda Qingdao Studios. However, the film's final billing credits name American studio Legendary Pictures as the sole production studio, with Toho and Huahua Media retaining an "In Association With" credit. A report by The Hollywood Reporter verified that Huahua Media invested a "major" financial stake in the film in April 2019 — after development, principal photography, and post-production had already been completed by Legendary. Huahua Media's role extended to only marketing the film in the Middle Kingdom and a share of the worldwide box office. Twenty-five percent of production costs were covered by Toho, which entitled them a larger share of revenue outside of royalties. Wanda Qingdao Studios is a filming facility and not a production studio; production was filmed in North America and not Qingdao where Wanda Qingdao Studios is based.)
- Language: English
- Budget: $170–200 million (Note: Entertainment Weekly, Box Office Mojo, and Deadline Hollywood reported that the film's production budget was $170 million; however, Deadline also noted that other analysts marked the budget at $185 million. In July 2018, the Hindustan Times reported the budget to be $200 million. This figure was also echoed by Variety in June 2019.)
- Box office: $387.3 million

Godzilla: King of the Monsters (Note: Released as Godzilla II: King of the Monsters in selected markets.) is a 2019 American monster film directed and co-written by Michael Dougherty. Produced by Legendary Pictures and distributed by Warner Bros. Pictures, it is a sequel to Godzilla (2014), the third film in Legendary's Monsterverse franchise, and the 35th film in the Godzilla franchise. (Note: It is the third Godzilla film to be completely produced by an American studio. The American releases of Godzilla (Godzilla, King of the Monsters!), King Kong vs. Godzilla, and The Return of Godzilla (Godzilla 1985) featured additional footage produced by independent American studios. The footage featured Western actors and merged it with the original Japanese footage in order to appeal to American audiences. Invasion of Astro-Monster was the first Godzilla film to be co-produced between a Japanese studio (Toho) and an American studio (UPA). The 1998 film Godzilla produced by TriStar Pictures is the first Godzilla film to be completely produced by an American studio.) The film stars Kyle Chandler, Vera Farmiga, Millie Bobby Brown, Bradley Whitford, Sally Hawkins, Charles Dance, Thomas Middleditch, Aisha Hinds, O'Shea Jackson Jr., David Strathairn, Ken Watanabe, and Zhang Ziyi. In the film, eco-terrorists release King Ghidorah, who awakens other "Titans" across the world, forcing Godzilla and Mothra to surface and engage Ghidorah and Rodan in a decisive battle.

The sequel was greenlit during the opening weekend of Godzilla, with Gareth Edwards expected to return to direct a trilogy. In May 2016, Edwards left the project. In October 2016, Dougherty and Shields were hired to rewrite the script. In January 2017, Dougherty was announced as the director. Principal photography began in June 2017 in Atlanta, Georgia, and wrapped in September 2017. The film is dedicated to executive producer Yoshimitsu Banno (director of Godzilla vs. Hedorah) and original Godzilla suit performer Haruo Nakajima, both of whom died in 2017.

Godzilla: King of the Monsters was theatrically released on May 31, 2019, to mixed reviews from critics, with praise for its visual effects, action sequences, cinematography, and musical score but with criticism to the plot, pacing, tone and characters. The film was a box office disappointment, grossing $387.3 million worldwide against a production budget of $170–200 million and marketing costs of $100–150 million, marking it the lowest-grossing film in the Monsterverse though it performed slightly better internationally.

A sequel, Godzilla vs. Kong, was released on March 24, 2021.

== Plot ==
Five years after the revelation of giant monsters, called "Titans", (Note: As depicted in Godzilla (2014)) Dr. Emma Russell, a paleobiologist working for the Titan-studying organization Monarch, and her daughter Madison witness the birth of a giant larva named Mothra. Emma calms Mothra with the "Orca", a device that emits bioacoustic frequencies to attract Titans or alter their behavior. A group of eco-terrorists, led by former British Army Colonel Alan Jonah, attacks the base and abducts Emma and Madison, while Mothra flees and pupates under a nearby waterfall.

Monarch scientists Dr. Ishirō Serizawa and Vivienne Graham approach former employee Dr. Mark Russell, Emma's ex-husband and Madison's father, to help track them down. Mark is initially reluctant due to his hatred toward Godzilla, whom he blames for his son Andrew's death in San Francisco, (Note: It is presumed that Andrew died while Godzilla fought the MUTOs in Godzilla (2014)) but eventually agrees. The Monarch team follows Godzilla to Antarctica, where Jonah plans to free a three-headed Titan codenamed "Monster Zero". Emma frees and awakens Monster Zero, which kills Graham and other members of Monarch's team, battles Godzilla, and flies off. The Monarch team realizes that Emma is working with the terrorists. From a bunker, Emma contacts Monarch, arguing that the Titans must all be awakened to heal Earth from the human impact on the environment, pointing to Monarch research indicating that Titans can terraform and replenish ecosystems using their radiation.

Conflicted, Madison begs her mother to reconsider, but Emma awakens Rodan in Mexico, who is lured toward Monster Zero. Monster Zero defeats Rodan and pursues the Monarch team, but Godzilla ambushes him, severing his left head. During the fight, the U.S. military launches a prototype weapon called the "Oxygen Destroyer", which seemingly kills Godzilla, but does not affect Monster Zero, who regrows his lost head and awakens the other dormant Titans worldwide; Rodan, who survived, submits to his rule. Horrified and disillusioned, Madison disowns Emma.

Through analyzing Monster Zero's abilities and mythological texts, Monarch deduces that he is King Ghidorah, a highly destructive alien who likely seeks to xenoform Earth to his liking. A fully transformed Mothra flies to Monarch's Bermuda base to communicate with Godzilla, who is recuperating in an ancient, radioactive underwater city, which the Monarch team discovers in a nuclear submarine. Deducing that it will take too long for Godzilla to heal on his own, Serizawa sacrifices himself by manually detonating a nuclear warhead next to Godzilla to speed up the process. The explosion destroys Godzilla's lair, but revives him and increases his power.

Emma realizes that Ghidorah's reign over the other Titans is bringing destruction far worse than anything humans could inflict, but Jonah ignores her pleas to try and stop it. Madison overhears her mother's plan to lure Ghidorah to Boston using the Orca, and steals the device to implement it herself. Arriving at Fenway Park, she broadcasts a frequency that calms the Titans, but unwittingly attracts them to her location. Ghidorah, attracted by the frequency, lands in Boston and almost kills Madison, but Godzilla, backed up by Monarch and military forces, arrives to battle him. Mark leads a team to rescue Madison, while learning that Godzilla's radiation levels are still increasing and will lead to a thermonuclear explosion. Mothra arrives to help Godzilla, but she is intercepted by Rodan, whom she defeats despite sustaining injuries.

Ghidorah overpowers Godzilla, but Mothra sacrifices herself and transfers her energy to Godzilla. The Russells are reunited and reactivate the Orca to lure Ghidorah away from Godzilla, buying time for him to recover. Emma stays behind with the Orca to distract Ghidorah, allowing her family and the Monarch team to escape. After absorbing Mothra's energy, Godzilla enters a newly empowered state and vaporizes Ghidorah's body and Emma with several nuclear pulses, before incinerating Ghidorah's remaining head with his atomic breath. Rodan and several other Titans converge on Godzilla and bow to him.

During the end credits, news clippings and Monarch public files show that the Titans are healing Earth, a suspected second Mothra egg has been discovered, and some Titans are converging on Skull Island. Ancient cave paintings depict Godzilla and a Kong-like Titan locked in battle. (Note: As depicted in Godzilla vs. Kong (2021)) In a post-credits scene, Jonah and his forces purchase Ghidorah's decapitated left head in Mexico.

== Cast ==
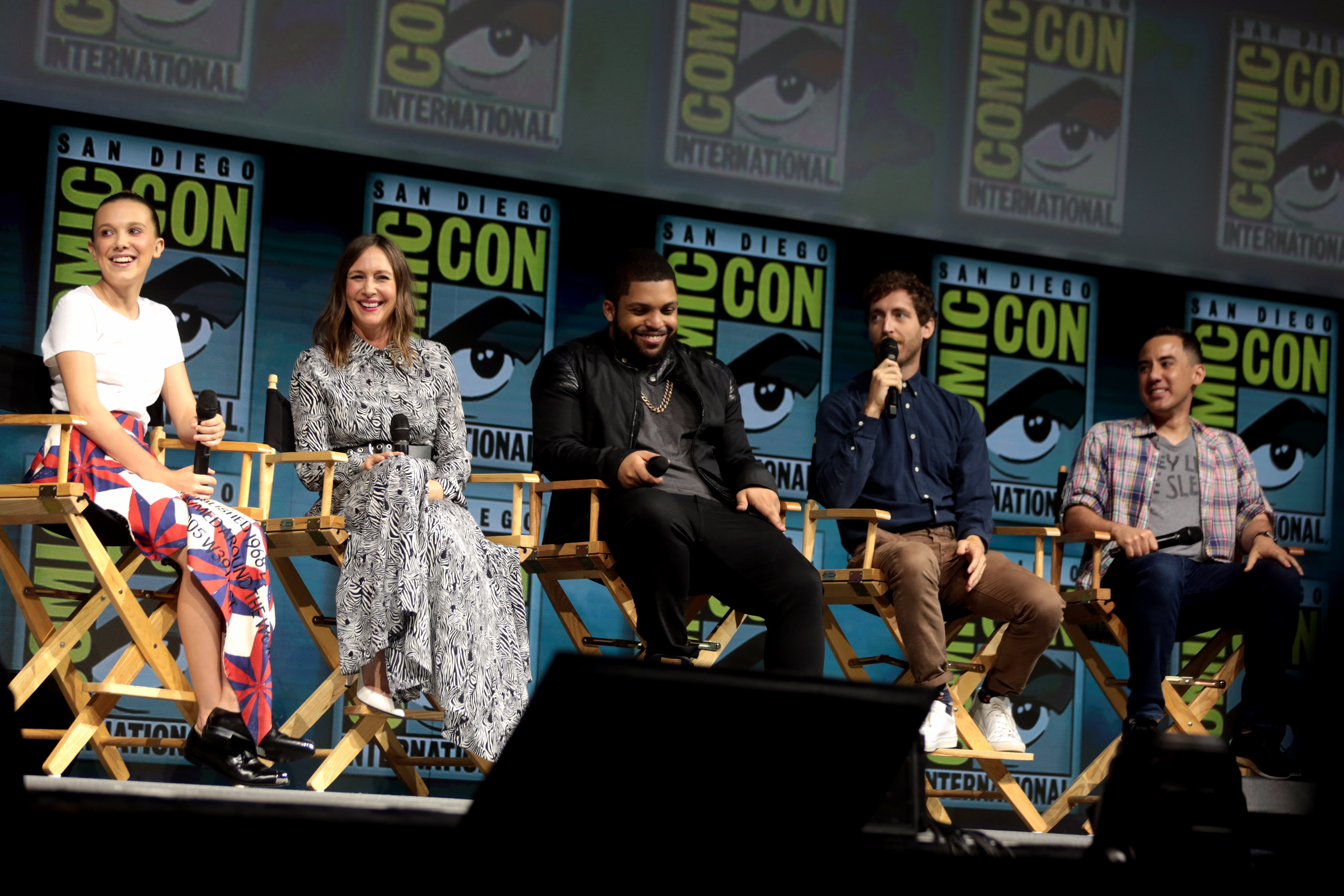
From left to right: Millie Bobby Brown, Vera Farmiga, O'Shea Jackson Jr., Thomas Middleditch, and Michael Dougherty speaking at the 2018 San Diego Comic Con.

- Kyle Chandler as Dr. Mark Russell:
  Emma's ex-husband, Madison's father, an animal behavior and communication specialist who formerly worked for Monarch, and co-inventor of the "Orca", a device that enables communication with the Titans, but can also "potentially control them using their bioacoustics on a sonar level". After suffering the loss of his son, Mark has an unfavorable opinion of the Titans, Godzilla in particular. Despite this, he joins a rescue mission along with Dr. Serizawa and Dr. Graham to save Emma and Madison from Alan Jonah and his terrorist group. Chandler spoke of the film's themes being about "healing the planet".
- Vera Farmiga as Dr. Emma Russell:
  Mark's ex-wife, Madison's mother and a renegade Monarch paleobiologist with a history of environmental activism in league with eco-terrorist Alan Jonah. She is the co-inventor of the Orca. Unlike Mark, Emma believes that humans and Titans can co-exist peacefully. She does not see Godzilla as evil, but as a potential savior in an age of catastrophic climate change. Farmiga stated that Emma views Godzilla in the same manner one views Mother Nature, specifying, "when these devastating natural occurrences come, it's because the environment has been mistreated and is showing righteous anger." Emma and Madison conspire with a mysterious organization interested in her technology, with their own plans for the creatures. Farmiga described her character as being a "DJ for the monsters", stating, "she has figured out a way to communicate with the creatures", she also described the film being about "saving the environment". Farmiga noted that while the previous film focused on a father/son relationship, King of the Monsters focuses on a mother/daughter relationship. Due to this, Farmiga believes the film may pass the Bechdel test.
- Millie Bobby Brown as Madison Russell:
  Emma and Mark's 12-year-old daughter. Scientifically gifted like her parents, Madison seeks to follow in her mother's footsteps. Although she is a co-conspirator in her mother's plan to release the Titans, Madison is more conflicted about it and Emma tricked her into it with lies and half-truths, claiming that it was to help people and save the world in Andrew's memory.
  - Lexi Rabe as Young Madison Russell
- Bradley Whitford as Dr. Rick Stanton:
  A crypto-sonographer working for Monarch. Dougherty confirmed that Dr. Stanton is loosely modeled after Rick Sanchez from Rick and Morty. Dougherty had the character "drink a lot" to keep the character in line with the spirit of Sanchez.
- Sally Hawkins as Dr. Vivienne Graham:
  A paleozoologist working for Monarch as Serizawa's right-hand woman. Hawkins reprises her role from Godzilla (2014).
- Charles Dance as Alan Jonah:
  A former British Army SAS Colonel and MI-6 agent who defected after becoming disillusioned by humanity during his time in the service. Obsessed with "leveling the global playing field" and restoring the natural order, he became the mercenary leader of an anarchist eco-terrorist group funded through the trafficking of Titan DNA. He conspires with Emma to help her use the Orca to further their shared agenda. Dougherty described Jonah as a mysterious character with conflicting ideas about the Titans' role in the world, believing that mankind has damaged the planet and that bringing back the Titans will potentially set things right.
- Thomas Middleditch as Sam Coleman:
  Monarch's Director of Technology, leader on the development of the Monarch Sciences network, and communications liaison with the U.S. government.
- Aisha Hinds as Colonel Diane Foster:
  A decorated Green Beret and the leader of the G-Team, the special military branch established by Monarch specializing in battles involving Titans if necessary.
- O'Shea Jackson Jr. as Jackson Barnes:
  A Green Beret chief warrant officer who is a member of the G-Team
- David Strathairn as Admiral William Stenz:
  An Admiral in the 7th Fleet of the United States Navy. He is the commander of the U.S. Navy task force and was previously in charge of tracking down the MUTOs. Strathairn reprises his role from Godzilla (2014).
- Ken Watanabe as Dr. Ishirō Serizawa:
  A high-ranking scientist working for Monarch. His father Eiji Serizawa was one of Monarch's founding members, so he is seen by many as the agency's de facto leader. Watanabe reprises his role from Godzilla (2014). Watanabe noted the film's themes, stating, "In the 21st century we need to think about natural disasters. This creature is symbolic of that natural disaster. We cannot control them, but we must live on this planet."
- Zhang Ziyi as Dr. Ilene Chen and Dr. Ling Chen:
  Dr. Ilene Chen is a mythologist working for Monarch, specializing in deciphering the mythological backgrounds of the Titans in connection with tales and legends throughout history. With her twin sister Dr. Ling Chen, Ilene is a third generation Monarch operative in her family, having joined the agency like their grandmother and mother before them. The Chens come from several generations of twins in their family, with an early pair visiting Infant Island, depicted in Mothra (1961) as Mothra's home. Dougherty intended the Chen sisters and their connection to Mothra to be a modernized version of the Shobijin, Mothra's twin fairies, explaining, "It was important to me to find ways to modernize the ideas that she has followers. Modernize the priestesses. There are still certain realms of believability to keep in take. You have to ease people into the more fantastical aspects." He noted that the twins were a "perfect example" showing humans and monsters cooperating and forming a "symbiotic relationship with each other". Dougherty also felt that the twins should be portrayed by Asian actresses, same as in the Toho films.

Joe Morton appears as an older Dr. Houston Brooks, a character that originally appeared in Kong: Skull Island, where he was portrayed by Corey Hawkins. Additionally, CCH Pounder portrays Senator Williams, Anthony Ramos portrays Staff Sergeant Anthony Martinez, Elizabeth Ludlow plays First Lieutenant Lauren Griffin, Jonathan Howard portrays Asher Jonah, and Randy Havens portrays Dr. Tim Mancini. Tyler Crumley plays Mark and Emma's son and Madison's brother Andrew. Kevin Shinick cameos as a weatherman. Through motion capture, T.J. Storm reprises his role as Godzilla, while Jason Liles, Alan Maxson, and Richard Dorton portray the heads of King Ghidorah. Liles also portrays Rodan via motion capture. Dougherty, co-writer Zach Shields, Seth Green, Clare Grant, Eli Roth, Stephen Moyer, and Jermaine Turner make uncredited appearances as members of a fighter jet squadron attacked by Rodan.

== Production ==
=== Crew ===
- Michael Dougherty – director, co-writer
- Zach Shields – co-writer, executive producer
- Barry H. Waldman – executive producer
- Dan Lin – executive producer
- Roy Lee – executive producer
- Yoshimitsu Banno – executive producer (posthumous)
- Kenji Okuhira – executive producer
- Alexandra Mendes – co-producer
- Scott Chambliss – production designer
- Louise Mingenbach – costume designer
- Guillaume Rocheron – visual effects supervisor
- Tom Woodruff Jr. – effects and creature designer

Personnel taken from the press release and The Global Dispatch.

=== Development ===
During the production of the previous film, Godzilla (2014), director Gareth Edwards stated that he did not want to be "sidetracked by other things" and wanted the film to work on its own with a "definitive ending." After a successful opening of $103 million internationally, producers Legendary Pictures quickly announced a sequel was in development. They elaborated that the goal was to produce a trilogy with Edwards attached to direct. At San Diego Comic-Con in July 2014, Legendary confirmed that they had acquired the rights to Rodan, Mothra, and King Ghidorah from Toho Co., Ltd. A short teaser clip showing concept art of all three with the ending tagline "Let them fight" was shown. In August 2014, Legendary announced that the sequel would be released on June 8, 2018, and that Max Borenstein (writer of the 2014 film) would return to write the screenplay.

In April 2015, Aaron Taylor-Johnson stated that he was unsure if he would reprise his role for the sequel and that his return depended on Edwards' decision. In October 2015, Legendary announced plans to unite Godzilla and Kong in a film titled Godzilla vs. Kong, then-set for a 2020 release date. Legendary is creating a shared cinematic franchise "centered around Monarch" that "brings together Godzilla and ... King Kong in an ecosystem of other giant super-species, both classic and new." While Legendary would maintain its home at Universal Pictures, it would continue to collaborate with Warner Bros. for the franchise. In May 2016, Warner Bros. announced that Godzilla 2 had been pushed back from its original June 8, 2018 release date to March 22, 2019, and shortly afterward, that Edwards had left the sequel to work on smaller-scale projects. Edwards also felt that Legendary "needed to get on with things" instead of waiting for him to finish work on Rogue One, but expressed his hope to work on Godzilla again one day.

In October 2016, it was announced that Michael Dougherty and Zach Shields (both of whom had worked on Krampus) would write the screenplay for Godzilla 2. A day later, it was reported that Dougherty was also in negotiations to direct Godzilla 2. That same month, Legendary announced that production would also take place at parent company Wanda's Qingdao Movie Metropolis facility in Qingdao, China, along with Pacific Rim: Uprising. In December 2016, Legendary announced that the official title for Godzilla 2 would be Godzilla: King of the Monsters. In January 2017, Dougherty was officially confirmed as the director. Dougherty stated that he was offered to direct first before being offered to re-write the script. When asked about his reaction to being asked to direct, Dougherty stated, "'Yes.' That was my reaction very, very quickly. I felt flattered, honored...and that continues to this day. It was a dream come true. And lots of pressure. Immense, immense pressure." Dougherty described the film as:

"The world is reacting to Godzilla in the same way we would react to any other terrifying incident, in that we are overreacting, but there's paranoia and endless speculation about whether he is the only one out there or whether we're threatened by others like his kind."

While Dougherty loved the 2014 film's slow-build, he said that he would "take the gloves off for this film. No holding back." While comparing King of the Monsters to the 2014 film, Dougherty said "I would call (my movie) the Aliens to Gareth's Alien". Dougherty elaborated by noting the balance between serious and "fun, tongue-in-cheek moments" from Aliens and that King of the Monsters would take a similar approach.

=== Writing ===
In September 2014, it was reported that Max Borenstein would return to write the script. While promoting Kong: Skull Island, Borenstein mentioned that one thing he aimed to do in the Godzilla sequel is make Godzilla more empathetic for the audience:

"When [Godzilla] blows his blue flame down the throat of the other creature—a creature we never empathized with in any way—we're empathizing with Godzilla. That's the thing about the movie that I'm most proud of, and I think Gareth did an amazing job pulling that off. I think that's what sets up our Godzilla franchise in a way that the second Godzilla movie can pick up on to begin to make Godzilla a more relatable, emphatic figure. But it needed that groundwork because you don't immediately invest emotionally in something that looks like a giant dragon or lizard."

Legendary's only mandate was to include Monarch, Rodan, Mothra, and King Ghidorah. For Dougherty's script, he and his team "started over from scratch". Dougherty began with a rough two-page treatment that contained basic beats and rough sketches of the characters. Subsequently, a writer's room was assembled that was run by Dougherty and co-writer/executive producer Zach Shields, with Borenstein participating. Ten writers contributed to building on the treatment. The script took a year to come together. Dougherty also changed, revised, and improved lines during filming and post-production. He felt the struggles of writing the script were balancing the monster spectacle "while still creating a story with human characters that we care about." While the previous film focused on Ford with Monarch in the background, Dougherty wanted the film to be focused on Monarch, feeling there was an opportunity to craft the organization as a group of heroes. Due to this, the film became an ensemble piece.

Dougherty and Shields chose a human story line where the science fiction elements could be replaced with themes such as climate change or eco-terrorism and stand out on its own without the monsters. Dougherty felt that the third act proved the most challenging in terms of writing as many of the human and monster story arcs converged and needed to be resolved. Shields confirmed that Emma's speech to Monarch went through several rewrites. Shields and Dougherty wanted the speech to present a moral question to audiences whether they would put their faith in humanity or Mother Nature.

In the original script, Mark and Sam were originally written as old friends. This was changed in later drafts from Sam to Serizawa to have him be the guiding force for Mark. Dougherty added the Oxygen Destroyer as a representation of "humanity's inability to not interfere." Dougherty and Shields chose to have Godzilla killed during the film's mid-point due to this being an idea that has not been done in previous Godzilla films. Shields noted that this was also to parallel Godzilla and Mark's characters, stating, "Kyle's loss of faith in the beginning, and finding it in this moment when he realizes, you know, God is dead." In Dougherty and Shields's treatment and early drafts, full sequences of the non-Toho Titans rising after Ghidorah's call were written but later trimmed due to budgetary concerns. Borenstein had originally written Mechagodzilla into the film. However, Dougherty scrapped the character during development.

=== Creature design ===
"So the concept we're running with is that this world belonged to them. If anything, we're the invasive species, and we've simply rediscovered something that's always been there and that they are in some ways, the old gods. The first gods. And that's something we're also trying to bring to this film for a more mythological, almost biblical, backdrop to the creatures."

— Dougherty on his approach for the monsters

The film reclassifies the monsters' designation from "MUTOs" to "Titans". For the monsters, Dougherty wanted their designs to emit a godly presence and evoke a sense of worship, stating, "Primitive man saw these creatures, and you want to give them a presence that would make him drop to his knees and bow to this god...It can't just look like big dinosaurs. Jurassic Park has that covered. These have to be distinct. They have to be their own thing. They're Titans." The director instructed the designers to look at the original designs from every era and "distill those silhouettes and those key traits into something more modern." It was important for the director that the Titans were not just treated as monsters but "very large animals with a distinct thought process."

For Godzilla, Dougherty wished to put back the "God in Godzilla". He liked the design that Gareth Edwards and Matt Allsopp conceived but wanted to tweak it by adding the dorsal plates of the 1954 iteration, as well as making the claws and feet bigger to make Godzilla look like a more powerful predator. The director had the sound design team expand on Godzilla's roar by making it sound closer to the roars of the 1954 incarnation, stating, "I think they did a great job with Godzilla's roar in the first movie. I pushed them a little bit further to bring it even closer to the (1954) original even more."

For Rodan, elements of volcanic rock were added to the scales and skin color to make Rodan look capable of living inside of a volcano. Dougherty wanted Rodan's design to resemble something that "Mother Nature could have created." The designers were instructed to not just look at Pteranodons but at various birds such as vultures, eagles, and hawks due to birds being related to dinosaurs. Dougherty described Rodan as a "bit of a rogue...you never quite know where his loyalties lie". The director further described Rodan as a "massive A-bomb" that brings "speed and ferocity." Tom Woodruff Jr. and Amalgamated Dynamics provided the creature design for Rodan. The Rodan pursuit scene was the first pre-viz sequence produced to be used as a pitch to Legendary.

For Mothra, Dougherty wanted to create something that was "beautiful, and feminine, and elegant, and looked like a true goddess, but also dangerous if she had to be." He attempted to remain faithful to the color palette of the original 1961 incarnation and retain the eye-spots on her wings. The eye-spots were designed to resemble Godzilla's eyes in order to create a connection between Mothra and Godzilla. Mothra was designed to resemble real moths and given longer legs in order to defend herself against other monsters, another attribute inspired by moths. Dougherty researched various moth species and discovered that some looked "scary" and "predatory". He wished to maintain a sense of realism for Mothra, stating, "...the approach for Mothra is to create an insectoid, huge creature that looks believable from every angle, and especially in motion." The director found Mothra the most difficult Titan to design because he wished to avoid making Mothra look like a blown-up moth. Legacy Effects provided the creature design for Mothra.

For King Ghidorah, Dougherty wanted to create a "unique" design that still resembled King Ghidorah, and worked closely with Toho to make sure the new design respected past incarnations. Each head was given its own personality, with the center being the alpha and the others its lackeys. He studied various animals, specifically king cobras, in order to add a sense of realism to the design. The designers were instructed to look at different scales from various reptiles to avoid having Ghidorah's scales looking similar to Godzilla or the original King Ghidorah. The director told the design team to maintain an Eastern dragon influence for Ghidorah and to avoid any Western dragon influence, stating, "They're not traditional western dragons. So those were marching orders from the beginning...We don't want it to look like Game of Thrones' dragons." Legacy Effects also provided the design for Ghidorah. While noting that the film is not a comedy, Dougherty likened Ghidorah to Rip Van Winkle, having a sense of curiosity and cruelty. Producer Alex Garcia described Ghidorah as "not part of the natural order."

Dougherty confirmed that the film would feature original, non-Toho monsters. The names of the non-Toho Titans were revealed as Baphomet, Typhon, Abaddon, Bunyip, Methuselah, Behemoth, Scylla, Tiamat, Leviathan, and Mokele-Mbembe. Dougherty created new monsters because he felt it was part of the "Toho tradition" to add new monsters to the Godzilla pantheon. Dougherty had originally hoped for Legendary to acquire other Toho monsters such as Anguirus, Biollante, and Gigan. However, the film's budget prevented them from acquiring additional Toho characters. However, the skeletal remains of a creature seemingly resembling Anguirus, who first appeared in the 1955 film Godzilla Raids Again, is briefly seen outside of Godzilla's lair. Dougherty stated that it "might or might not be Anguirus".

For the roars, the director felt it was important "getting the noises right." He gave the sound designers a "super cut" of the monster roars from the Shōwa Godzilla films, and had them start from there. He stated that the monsters would have new roars that would resemble the original incarnations. Dougherty had the Shōwa roars on a massive speaker system to use on-set for scenes where actors had to run from or react to the monsters.

=== Pre-production ===
In late January 2017, Millie Bobby Brown was the first to be cast for the film, in her feature film debut. In February 2017, Kyle Chandler and Vera Farmiga were cast as the parents to Brown's character. In March 2017, it was reported that O'Shea Jackson Jr. was in talks for a role in the film. In April 2017, Aisha Hinds was confirmed to join the cast of the film. In May 2017, Anthony Ramos, Randy Havens, Thomas Middleditch, and Charles Dance were added to the cast, and Sally Hawkins was confirmed to return. A press release confirmed Watanabe's return for the sequel. In June 2017, Bradley Whitford and Zhang Ziyi were added to the cast, with the latter playing a "major role" in the Monsterverse. In July 2017, Elizabeth Ludlow was added to the cast. In April 2018, Jason Liles, Alan Maxson, and Richard Dorton were cast to provide the motion capture for the heads of King Ghidorah, with Dorton performing the left head, Liles performing the middle head, and Maxson performing the right head. Other actors perform the body. Liles also provided the performance capture for Rodan.

Matthew E. Cunningham was hired as a Senior Illustrator during the research and development stage. Cunningham designed most of the vehicles after the storyboard artist worked with Dougherty. Senior conceptual designer George Hull provided a series of concept paintings of vehicles and monster imagery. Production designer Scott Chambliss managed all the art directors. Artists would sometimes show concept art to the writers, producers, and director; however, Chambliss had final say on what would be shown to Dougherty and the producers. After the illustrations were approved, they were delivered for pre-vis. The visual effects used concept art and pre-viz as a reference. Legacy Effects, who had worked on Edwards' Godzilla, were brought back to provide additional concept art.

=== Filming ===
Principal photography began on June 19, 2017, in Atlanta, Georgia under the working title Fathom. Dougherty confirmed that the film would feature practical effects and creature designs by Tom Woodruff Jr. Lawrence Sher served as director of photography. Parts of the film were shot in the Historic Center of Mexico City between August 19–22, 2017. Dougherty announced the film had wrapped production on September 27, 2017.

=== Visual effects and post-production ===
Visual effects for the film were provided by Moving Picture Company (MPC), DNEG, Method Studios, Raynault VFX, Rodeo FX and Ollin VFX. Guillaume Rocheron was the main visual effects supervisor. In November 2018, post-production on the film officially ended. The brief shots of the non-Toho Titans were "late additions" during post-production. Dougherty said that an earlier cut of the film was nearly three hours long. Dougherty affectionately referred to the three-hour cut as Godzilla: The Miniseries. He considered splitting the film into two parts but decided against it, feeling that the final cut is faithful to the core of his original vision.

== Music ==
On July 21, 2018, Dougherty revealed that Bear McCreary would compose the film's score, incorporating themes from Akira Ifukube's previous Godzilla scores. Regarding his involvement, McCreary stated, "I am thrilled to be the composer for Godzilla: King of the Monsters, and honored beyond words to have the opportunity to contribute to one of cinema's longest-running musical legacies." McCreary further expanded on his plans and involvement, stating;

"I've known Michael Dougherty for a long time, as we both run in the same film-nerd circles. I have always appreciated his love of film music, chatting with him for hours on end over the years about the scores we both love. I was thrilled for him when he landed the gig to direct Godzilla, because I knew what it meant to him. When he later asked me to join the project, I was overwhelmed with excitement, and awe, grateful for the chance to join him in contributing to the legacy of our favorite monster. We knew from the beginning that we wanted to incorporate classic [Akira] Ifukube themes, and yet I think fans will be excited to hear how they have evolved. There are some fun surprises in store. Fitting the material and Michael's visionary film, this score is the most massive I have ever written, and I can't wait for fans to experience it!"

The first trailer featured a rearrangement of Claude Debussy's Clair de Lune by Michael Afanasyev for Imagine Music. The Beautiful TV spot and final trailer featured two different renditions of "Over the Rainbow". An alternate mix of Nessun dorma was featured in the extended IMAX preview. LL Cool J's "Mama Said Knock You Out" was featured in the Exclusive Final Look trailer. In November 2018, a sample of McCreary's Godzilla theme was leaked online after it was used during a panel at Tokyo Comic Con. In April 2019, WaterTower Music released two tracks from the soundtrack, "Old Rivals", composed by McCreary, and a cover of Blue Öyster Cult's "Godzilla" by Serj Tankian. Brendon Small, Gene Hoglan, and other members of Dethklok contributed to the Tankian cover.

McCreary called the cover "the most audacious piece of music" of his career, citing the orchestra, choir, taiko chanting, taiko drumming, heavy metal rhythm section, Hoglan's double-kick drums, and Tankian's vocals used to produce the track. McCreary stated "For [the character] Godzilla, I chose to incorporate and adapt the legendary Akira Ifukube's iconic theme, and for Mothra, Yūji Koseki's immortal 'Mothra's Song'."

The Japanese band Alexandros contributed the single "Pray" for the film's Japanese release. On this decision, Dougherty commented, "we feel incredibly fortunate to have had [Alexandros] contribute such an anthemic song that captures not only the gravitas of the film, but also perfectly complements its dramatic conclusion." The single was released on May 13, 2019. The soundtrack was released by Waxwork Records in 2019 on a triple LP.

== Marketing ==
The marketing costs were reported to range $100–150 million. In June 2017, Legendary's official Twitter account for Kong: Skull Island began posting videos revealing a timeline and background information of Monarch's discoveries, which teased elements for Godzilla: King of the Monsters and Godzilla vs. Kong. During the 2017 San Diego Comic-Con, Legendary revealed an image of a stone sculpture featuring Mothra, two larvae, and an egg. On July 12, 2018, two first-look images featuring Godzilla unleashing his atomic breath skyward, and Millie Bobby Brown and Vera Farmiga, were released, along with a few plot details.

On July 18, 2018, a teaser clip was released featuring Brown, and the viral Monarch website went live with documents providing information on the monsters. On July 21, 2018, the first trailer was shown at San Diego Comic-Con and later released online that same day. In October 2018, Legendary Comics held a panel titled Godzilla: Secrets of the Monsterverse at the L.A. Comic Con, which presented a sneak peek at the prequel comic Godzilla: Aftershock. In November 2018, a panel for the film was held at the Tokyo Comic-Con where Dougherty revealed concept art, a teaser for an upcoming trailer, and the S.H.MonsterArts figures with designs of the Titans.

In early December 2018, teaser clips of Rodan, Mothra, and King Ghidorah from a then-upcoming trailer were released online. On December 9, 2018, a new trailer premiered at Comic Con Experience. On December 10, 2018, the film's first teaser poster and CCXP trailer were released. On December 13, 2018, character posters for Rodan, Mothra, and Ghidorah were released. In January 2019, Dougherty released a new image of King Ghidorah via Twitter, and in February 2019, four new character posters of Godzilla, Rodan, Mothra, and King Ghidorah were released to celebrate the Chinese New Year.

In March 2019, the film was featured on the cover of Total Film which revealed exclusive photos and information. An extended preview was exclusively presented at WonderCon and CinemaCon, later in the month. Warner Bros. attached the extended preview to all IMAX screenings of Shazam! and The Curse of La Llorona, while US theater chain AMC Theatres (of which the parent company of Legendary, Wanda Group, are a majority stakeholder in) attached the preview to their IMAX screenings of Avengers: Endgame. In April 2019, the main theatrical poster was released online. On April 21, 2019, the extended preview was released on HBO's streaming services, and then on April 23, 2019, the final trailer was released online.

The Chinese investor and film marketer Huahua Media invested an undisclosed sum to market the film in China. The deal also grants the company participation in the film's box office. In May 2019, a Godzilla head was built on top of the Cinerama Dome to promote the film. That same month, the IMAX and RealD 3D posters were released. Robin Lopez created several TV spots, titled Robzilla: King of the Mascots, promoting the film and the NBA playoffs. The website Joe created a mock-trailer, titled Pugzilla: King of the Dogsters, by replacing the Titans with cats and dogs. Dougherty shared the video on his Twitter. On May 22, 2019, a clip featuring Brown and Ghidorah premiered on The Tonight Show. On May 23, 2019, a new Chinese poster was released.

=== Merchandise ===
A prequel graphic novel, Godzilla: Aftershock, was released in May 2019. Aftershock was written by Arvid Nelson and illustrated by Drew Edward Johnson. S.H. MonsterArts figures of kaiju in the movie were released for sale in June 2019. The film's novelization was released on May 31, 2019; the art book The Art of Godzilla: King of the Monsters was released on June 4, 2019. NECA, Jakks Pacific, and Bandai all produced toy lines for the film featuring its monsters.

== Release ==
=== Theatrical ===
Godzilla: King of the Monsters was released on May 31, 2019, in IMAX, 3D, Dolby Cinema, RealD 3D, 4DX, and ScreenX formats by Warner Bros. Pictures, except in Japan where it was distributed by Toho. The film was originally scheduled to be released on June 8, 2018. However, in May 2016, it was pushed back to March 22, 2019, and later again to its current release date. The film was released in ScreenX formats in some markets. In the United States, the film was given a PG-13 rating for "sequences of monster action, violence, and destruction, and for some language." In April 2019, a private screening was held for the press at Toho Studios in Tokyo, which was followed by a 30-minute Q&A with Dougherty and Ken Watanabe. In early May 2019, advanced screenings were held for audiences ahead of the film's release, and on May 17, 2019, a VIP press screening was held in Los Angeles at the AMC Century City theater.

The film had its red-carpet premiere in Beijing on May 13, 2019. It then had its second red-carpet premiere at Grauman's Chinese Theatre in Hollywood on May 18, 2019. A group of Taiko drummers delivered a performance signaling the opening of the ceremony prior to the actors' arrival. Prior to the Hollywood premiere, Warner Bros. hosted a block party. A green-screen photo booth was made available that allowed attendees to be placed in scenes from the film. Regal Cinemas offered collectible tickets to IMAX attendees, along with a mini-poster of the ticket image. The collectible tickets were offered in two sizes: Standard (measuring 4" × 7.5") and Godzilla-sized (5.125" × 9.5"). In June 2019, the film received a one-month theatrical extension in China.

=== Home media ===
The film was released on Digital HD on August 13, 2019, and released on DVD, Blu-ray, Blu-ray 3D and Ultra HD Blu-ray on August 27, 2019. The 4K release includes HDR10, HDR10+, Dolby Vision high dynamic range, and a Dolby Atmos soundtrack. Best Buy released a retail exclusive of its own as a 4K UHD Combo steelbook release. The film's home media release debuted at number 1 on the NPD VideoScan First Alert chart. In the United States and Canada, the DVD earned $12.9 million and the Blu-ray earned $23.6 million, totaling $36.6 million in domestic video sales.

Toho released multiple editions of the film on 4K, Blu-ray, and DVD in Japan on December 18, 2019, which included retail exclusives from Amazon, the Godzilla Store, and Tsutaya. Toho also released a four-disc, limited-edition set which included the 4K Blu-ray, standard Blu-ray, DVD, bonus features Blu-ray, and an S.H. MonsterArts Godzilla figure. The Godzilla Store exclusive of the four-disc set featured a limited-edition Movie Monster Series figure of the film's version of Burning Godzilla. The retail exclusives included limited special clear files. In January 2020, the film made its pay cable debut on HBO.

== Reception ==
=== Box office ===
Godzilla: King of the Monsters grossed $110.5 million in the United States and Canada, and $276.8 million in other territories, for a worldwide total of $387.3 million. Reports on the film's break even point varies; Erik Childress of Rotten Tomatoes estimated the film would have needed to gross $550–600 million to break even. Chris Agar of Screen Rant estimated by the rule of thumb that the film required $400 million worldwide "just to make its money back."

In the United States and Canada, the film was released alongside Rocketman and Ma, and was projected to gross $55–65 million from 4,108 theaters in its opening weekend. The film made $19.6 million on its first day, including $6.3 million from Thursday night previews, which was lower than the $9.3 million made by the 2014 film but more than Kong: Skull Island's $3.7 million. It went on to debut to $47.8 million, finishing first at the weekend box office but below expectations. Deadline Hollywood said the film "lacked urgency," having debuted its first trailer over a year before the film's release, and not separating its appearance from previous Godzilla films. The film fell 67% in its second weekend to $15.5 million, finishing in fourth, and then to $8.1 million the following weekend, finishing seventh.

Worldwide, the film was initially projected to earn around $180 million from 75 other territories in its opening weekend, for a global total of $230–235 million. It was speculated that the amount could go higher if the film over-performed in China, where it was projected to debut to $75–90 million. The film held early previews in China on May 25, 2019, where it grossed $2.5 million. King of the Monsters made $12.7 million from 51 countries on Thursday and $31.4 million from 75 countries on Friday. In China, the film grossed $54.15 million through Friday and Saturday. The film ended up grossing a total of $130 million internationally and $177.8 million including North American tallies, far below projections. Its largest markets were China ($70 million), the United Kingdom ($4.4 million), France ($2.6 million) and South Korea ($2.2 million). The film dropped 64% to $47.1 million in its second weekend of international play, for a ten-day running total of $213.7 million.

=== Critical response ===
The Observer stated reviews were "mixed to negative". The Indian Express called reviews "largely negative". Screen Rant described responses as "so negative". Yahoo! Finance noted the reviews to be a "pretty mixed bag". Scott Mendelson from Forbes stated the film earned "mixed reviews", but later stated the film earned "mixed-negative reviews".

On the review aggregator website Rotten Tomatoes, 42% of 353 critics' reviews are positive, with an average rating of 5.1/10. The website's consensus reads: "Godzilla: King of the Monsters delivers spectacular kaiju action -- and reaffirms that cutting-edge effects are still no substitute for a good story." Metacritic, which uses a weighted average, assigned the film a score of 48 out of 100, based on 46 critics, indicating "mixed or average" reviews. Audiences polled by CinemaScore gave the film an average grade of "B+" on an A+ to F scale, the same grade earned by the first two Monsterverse installments, while those at PostTrak gave it an overall positive score of 85% (with an average 4.5 out of 5 stars) and a 75% "definite recommend".

Benjamin Lee of The Guardian gave the film 2 out of 5 stars, writing that it "has rare moments of visual splendour but they can't disguise a laughable script with a ramshackle narrative." Chris Evangelista of /Film gave the film a score of 6.5 out of 10, criticizing the human characters and writing that "The ultimate kaiju smack-down shouldn't be this boring." Kate Erbland of IndieWire gave the film a grade of "C−", calling it "dark, wet, and inept," while Mike Ryan of Uproxx also gave the film a negative review, writing that "When a movie is just nonstop monster action, guess what happens? It all becomes the new 'normal' and it becomes boring." Ben Travis, writing for Empire Online, gave the film 1 out of 5 stars, stating, "Globe-trotting but not adventurous, action-packed but not remotely exciting, utterly overstuffed and completely paper-thin."

Owen Gleiberman of Variety wrote that the film "makes for a spectacular clash of the titans, but this one has a less commanding balance of schlock and awe," compared to its predecessor. Conversely, Alonso Duralde of the TheWrap praised the film for taking an "all-thriller-no-filler approach both to monsters and the human drama." Scott Collura of IGN.com gave the film a score of 7.8 out of 10, calling it "a fun exercise in giant monster madness that indulges in all the kaiju fights fans and even casual viewers could hope for." For Bloody Disgusting, William Bibbiani wrote

Godzilla: King of the Monsters is a big, kinda silly, but otherwise exciting blockbuster. It's gorgeous, it's epic in the extreme, and it features some of the most impressive monster fights you've ever seen. Maybe someday Americans will make a Godzilla movie that isn't just 'badass,' but which also works on another level and resonates in a meaningful way.

James Whitbrook of Io9 said the film "is little more than beautifully stunning sound and fury, sadly signifying nothing for its human stars—beyond them being a vector in which the movie can thickly spread on some b-movie cheese that lends the whole endeavor a sort of 'classic monster movie with a modern budget' vibe."

=== Accolades ===
Award	Date of ceremony	Category	Recipient(s)	Result	Ref.
Australian Effects & Animation Festival	August 16, 2019	MPC Film for Feature Films, VFX	Godzilla: King of the Monsters	Bronze	
Blue Ribbon Awards	February 18, 2020	Best Foreign Film	Godzilla: King of the Monsters	Nominated	
Golden Raspberry Awards	March 16, 2020	Worst Prequel, Remake, Rip-off or Sequel	Godzilla: King of the Monsters	Nominated	
Indiana Film Journalists Association Awards	December 16, 2019	Best Vocal / Motion Capture Performances	Jason Lilee, Alan Manson, and Richard Dorton	Won	
IFMCA	February 20, 2020	Best Original Score for a Fantasy/Science Fiction/Horror Film	Bear McCreary	Nominated	
IFMCA	February 20, 2020	Film Composer of the Year	Bear McCreary (also for Child's Play, Happy Death Day 2U, The Professor and the Madman, Eli, and Rim of the World)	Won	
Golden Trailer Awards	May 29, 2019	Best Summer Blockbuster	"Over the Rainbow" (Statement Advertising)	Nominated	
Golden Trailer Awards	May 29, 2019	Best Fantasy Adventure	"Life" (Trailer Park, Inc.)	Nominated	
Golden Trailer Awards	July 22, 2021	Best Fantasy Adventure TV Spot (for a Feature Film)	Godzilla: King of the Monsters (Create Advertising Group)	Won	
Golden Trailer Awards	July 22, 2021	Most Innovative Advertising for a Feature Film	"Cinemark" (Framework)	Nominated	
Guild of Music Supervisors Awards	February 13, 2019	Best Music Supervision for Trailers	Bobby Gumm (Trailer Park)	Nominated	
Hollywood Professional Association	November 21, 2019	Outstanding Sound – Theatrical Feature	Erik Aadahl, Jason W. Jennings, Nancy Nugent, Tim LeBlanc and Tom Ozanich	Won	
People's Choice Awards	November 10, 2019	Favorite Action Movie of 2019	Godzilla: King of the Monsters	Nominated	
People's Choice Awards	November 10, 2019	Favorite Female Movie Star of 2019	Millie Bobbie Brown	Nominated	
Reel Music Awards	March 23, 2020	Original Score for a Fantasy/Science Fiction/Horror Feature	Bear McCreary	Won	
Rondo Hatton Classic Horror Awards	April 6, 2020	Best Film	Godzilla: King of the Monsters	Runner-up	
Saturn Awards	September 13, 2019	Best Fantasy Film	Godzilla: King of the Monsters	Nominated	
Saturn Awards	September 13, 2019	Best Performance by a Younger Actor	Millie Bobby Brown	Nominated	
Saturn Awards	September 13, 2019	Best Music	Bear McCreary	Nominated	
Saturn Awards	September 13, 2019	Best Special Effects	Guillaume Rocheron, Eric Frazier, Brian Connor and Peter Nofz	Nominated	
Young Entertainer Awards	November 6, 2021	Best Supporting Young Actor - Feature Film	Gabriel L. Silva	Nominated	

== Sequel ==
In September 2015, Legendary's Kong: Skull Island was moved from Universal to Warner Bros., which sparked media speculation that Godzilla and King Kong would appear in a film together. In October 2015, Legendary confirmed that they would unite Godzilla and King Kong in Godzilla vs. Kong. They planned to create a shared cinematic franchise "centered around Monarch" that "brings together Godzilla and Legendary's King Kong in an ecosystem of other giant super-species, both classic and new."

Godzilla vs. Kong was theatrically released internationally on March 24, 2021, and released in the United States on March 31, 2021, simultaneously in theaters and on HBO Max.

== Bibliography ==
- Bernstein, Abbie (2019). The Art of Godzilla: King of the Monsters. Titan Books. ISBN 9781789090680.
- Dougherty, Michael; Shields, Zach; Jackson Jr., O'Shea (2019). Godzilla: King of the Monsters Audio Commentary (Blu-ray). Warner Bros Home Entertainment.
- Kalat, David (2010). A Critical History and Filmography of Toho's Godzilla Series (second ed.). McFarland. ISBN 9780786447497.
- Ryfle, Steve (1998). Japan's Favorite Mon-Star: The Unauthorized Biography of the Big G. ECW Press. ISBN 1550223488.
- Yount, Kyle (2019). TJ Storm, Godzilla Motion Capture Actor (Podcast). Kaijucast.
