= Harbinger Down =

2015 American science fiction monster horror film

- Teaser Poster
- Directed by: Alec Gillis
- Written by: Alec Gillis
- Produced by: Tom Woodruff Jr.
- Starring: Lance Henriksen; Giovonnie Samuels; Matt Winston
- Music by: Christopher Drake
- Production companies: Amalgamated Dynamics; Dark Dunes Productions
- Release date: August 7, 2015
- Running time: 82 minutes
- Country: United States
- Language: English

Harbinger Down (also known as Inanimate in the United Kingdom) is a 2015 American independent science-fiction monster horror film written and directed by Alec Gillis and produced by Tom Woodruff Jr., the founders of the special effects company StudioADI, and starring Lance Henriksen.

The film follows a group of graduate students aboard the crabbing trawler Harbinger who are studying the effects of global warming on a pod of Belugas in the Bering Sea. They recover a crashed Soviet spacecraft encased in a block of ice that is apparently virulently infected with mutated tardigrades, and after thawing, they are attacked by the mutated creatures.

Funded by fan donations through Kickstarter, the film predominantly features practical creature effects created by ADI, including animatronics, prosthetic makeup, stop motion and miniature effects. Computer generated imagery was used only to enhance these effects (such as digitally erasing control wires and gimbals). Director Alec Gillis made the film in response to his special effects being replaced with CGI in The Thing (2011).

== Plot ==
In 1982, a Soviet moon lander crashes into the Bering Sea. In 2015, biology professor Stephen and graduate students Ronelle and Sadie go on an experimental tour to study the effects of global warming on whales. Sadie's grandfather, Graff, takes them to sea in his fishing trawler Harbinger, crewed by Bowman, Roland, Big G, Dock, Svetlana and Atka.

One night, Sadie is awakened by the crew working and their equipment detects whale activities in the area. After trying unsuccessfully to wake the others, Sadie investigates on her own. With Sadie operating the sonar equipment and the crew's help, they discover and retrieve the crashed lander, encased in ice. Ronelle and Stephen are awakened by the commotion. Stephen claims ownership of the lander, but Graff disputes this and declares it belongs to Sadie.

Bowman encourages Sadie to investigate the lander before Stephen can claim it for himself. While Big G distracts Stephen, Sadie inspects the lander and discovers the Soviet cosmonaut died of an unknown infection, taking a skin sample to analyze. Learning Sadie had examined the lander before him, Stephen becomes frustrated and threatens to destroy her career unless she signs over the discovery to him. Graff threatens to take the issue to the courts, but Sadie gives in. Sadie later learns that the lander was carrying tardigrades, a hardy terrestrial life-form that can survive in extreme conditions. However, cosmic radiation caused them to mutate and become capable of shapeshifting.

After the cosmonaut's body goes missing, Stephen examines the lander and becomes contaminated with the tardigrades, and the reanimated cosmonaut's body kills Roland. Stephen begins stripping on deck despite the sub-zero temperatures. As the others drag him back in, stalks sprout from his back and spray a dark liquid over everyone. Sadie confirms that they are all potentially contaminated. The group use liquid nitrogen to freeze Stephen's body and the lander.

When Dock begins to show signs of infection, Svetlana locks him in a cage and prepares to incinerate him. The others object to the plan until Dock also sprouts tentacle-like growths. The ship's power gets cut, and the backup battery kicks in. As they work to restore it, the organism kills Atka, during which Svetlana is revealed to be a Russian spy. Holding Sadie, Bowman, Big G, Ronelle and Graff at gunpoint, she explains that the tardigrades were part of a Soviet experiment to create radiation-resistant cosmonauts. She intends to sink the boat after boarding a nearby Russian submarine. Before she can kill everyone, however, the organism attacks, dragging off Ronelle and Svetlana.

Survivors Graff, Sadie, Bowman and Big G search for explosive charges that Svetlana has hidden throughout the boat. The last four charges are hidden in the bilge, a tight area which only Sadie has access to. As she collects the explosives, the others discover that the tardigrades consumed and absorbed their latest catch, two tons of crab. They call down to warn Sadie, who realizes she is standing amid the tardigrades and escapes in time, but Graff is infected. He instructs Big G to restart the boat and Sadie to pilot it before asking Bowman to kill him.

Big G restarts the ship but is killed by the mutated Svetlana. Before Bowman can freeze Graff with the liquid nitrogen, the creature impales him. Graff instructs Sadie to scuttle the boat and save herself. She steers it toward an iceberg and escapes while the creature bursts through the deck. Via the portable radio, the US Coast Guard alerts her that a rescue helicopter is in her vicinity. The helicopter approaches as Sadie passes out and lies motionless on the ice.

== Cast ==
- Lance Henriksen as Graff
- Giovonnie Samuels as Ronelle
- Matt Winston as Stephen
- Camille Balsamo as Sadie
- Reid Collums as Bowman
- Mike Estime as Dock
- Milla Bjorn as Svetlana
- Winston James Francis as "Big G"
- Jason Speer as Sergei
- Edwin H. Bravo as Atka
- Sean Serino as Tamara
- Morgana Ignis as Tardigrade
- Kraig W. Sturtz as Roland

== Production ==
=== Background ===
"We looked at that and said, 'There are still people who like what we do!' because we had been getting beaten up a bit over the last five or six years in feature films. So we decided to put up a couple of other videos, like our Green Goblin test makeup for the first Spider-Man film, and that video got an even bigger fan response than The Thing did, so we thought, 'Well, maybe people would be interested in our work for Ridley Scott's I Am Legend', and again, there was another big outpouring of, 'Why didn’t they use makeups like that instead of the digital characters they used?'"
— Alec Gillis describing the Internet's response to the behind-the-scenes videos of their special effects.

In 2010, Amalgamated Dynamics was hired by Universal Studios to create the practical special effects for the 2011 The Thing prequel. However, before the film was released, the majority of ADI's effects work on the film was digitally replaced in post production by computer-generated imagery. This decision was upsetting to the crew of Amalgamated Dynamics, as this was not the first film of theirs where they later found their work replaced.

After the release of The Thing, in response to fan queries about what became of ADI's effects for the film, Alec Gillis and Tom Woodruff Jr. uploaded a behind-the-scenes video to YouTube which showcased their original practical effects prior to their replacement. According to Gillis and Woodruff, the video received such an overwhelmingly positive response that it inspired them to use their official YouTube Channel to feature their archived videos of creature effects from throughout their career. Gillis said that it was the tipping point that prompted them to go ahead with their dream of producing their own film. "Honestly, we were resistant to it at first, so it wasn't until I looked around my shop and saw an empty facility that I realized we were actually at the mercy of studios that didn't actually care about our techniques anymore. They view it as a commodity and a product, and they've corporatized the structure of creating art and in the end it all becomes disposable. That's not how the fans see our work."

The film's in-story events open on June 25, 1982, a tribute to the release date of John Carpenter's The Thing.

=== Kickstarter campaign ===
On May 8, 2013, Alec Gillis began a Kickstarter drive for Harbinger Down, advertising the film as being a monster horror film that was, "in the spirit of two of the greatest sci-fi/horror films of all time, ALIEN and THE THING", and that would feature only practical techniques to create the film's monsters, including the use of animatronics, prosthetic makeup, stop motion and miniature effects, with the film's creatures featuring no digital animation outside of rod/rig removal and digital compositing. With a budget goal of $350,000, the film would have Lance Henriksen attached to star, composers Joel McNeely and Michael Larrabee creating the musical score, and would also feature the efforts of Oscar-nominated model builders Pat McClung, Robert Skotak and Dennis Skotak.

By 7 June 2013, Amalgamated Dynamics funded Harbinger Down, making it the most successfully funded sci-fi/horror project in Kickstarter history, at $384,181. Gillis stated that while the money raised by the campaign would be sufficient to fund the "nuts and bolts" of the film, the film's special effects would have to be created at Gillis and Woodruff's own expense due to the film's low budget. The success of the Kickstarter campaign went on to draw the attention of producer Sultan Saeed Al Darmaki, who provided additional funding for the film through his company Dark Dunes Productions.

=== Principal photography ===
Principal photography began on January 27, 2014. The cast includes Lance Henriksen, Giovonnie Samuels, Camille Balsamo, Reid Collums, and Matt Winston.

== Release ==
=== Theatrical ===
Harbinger down was first released on August 7, 2015 in the United States before being released internationally later that year.

=== Home and streaming ===
The film was released on OTT platforms on December 5, 2016.

== Reception ==
Harbinger Down was poorly received by critics. The review aggregator website Rotten Tomatoes reported that 38% of critics have given the film a positive review based on 8 reviews, with an average rating of 3.80 out of 10.

Joe Leydon of Variety gave the film moderate praise, writing, "Made by and for aficionados of '80s-era sci-fi/horror thrillers, 'Harbinger Down' ranks somewhere between self-consciously cheesy SyFy Channel fare and better-than-average direct-to-video product in terms of production values, performance levels and overall ability to sustain interest while generating suspense. Theatrical exposure will be fleeting, but this small-budget, high-concept trifle could attract home-screen traffic if favorable word of mouth is sparked by the enthusiasm of genre-friendly websites and bloggers." Biologists Mark Blaxter and Arakawa Kazuharu note the film as an example of tardigrades having "rare but entertaining walk-on parts" in science fiction and fantasy.

Joel Hike of LetterBoxd gave the film a 2.5/5 and says, "The film looks quite good, making good use of what I assume is a real ship as their set. The atmosphere and the cinematography are fine as well."

Esme Gray of Triskaidekafiles, on October 8, 2025, said, "Overall, Harbinger Down is a flawed movie with a bunch of good ideas (Borrowed from some of the best horror movies made, to be honest, but like I said...), but is still worth seeing for a fun story with a new creature, and ends up being satisfying with its conclusion. I may not have fallen in love with the movie, but it still delivered on most of the promises of the initial concept. Harbinger Down is a worthy addition to the paranoia shapechanging alien monster genre, and worth your time."
