= Randy Havens =

American actor

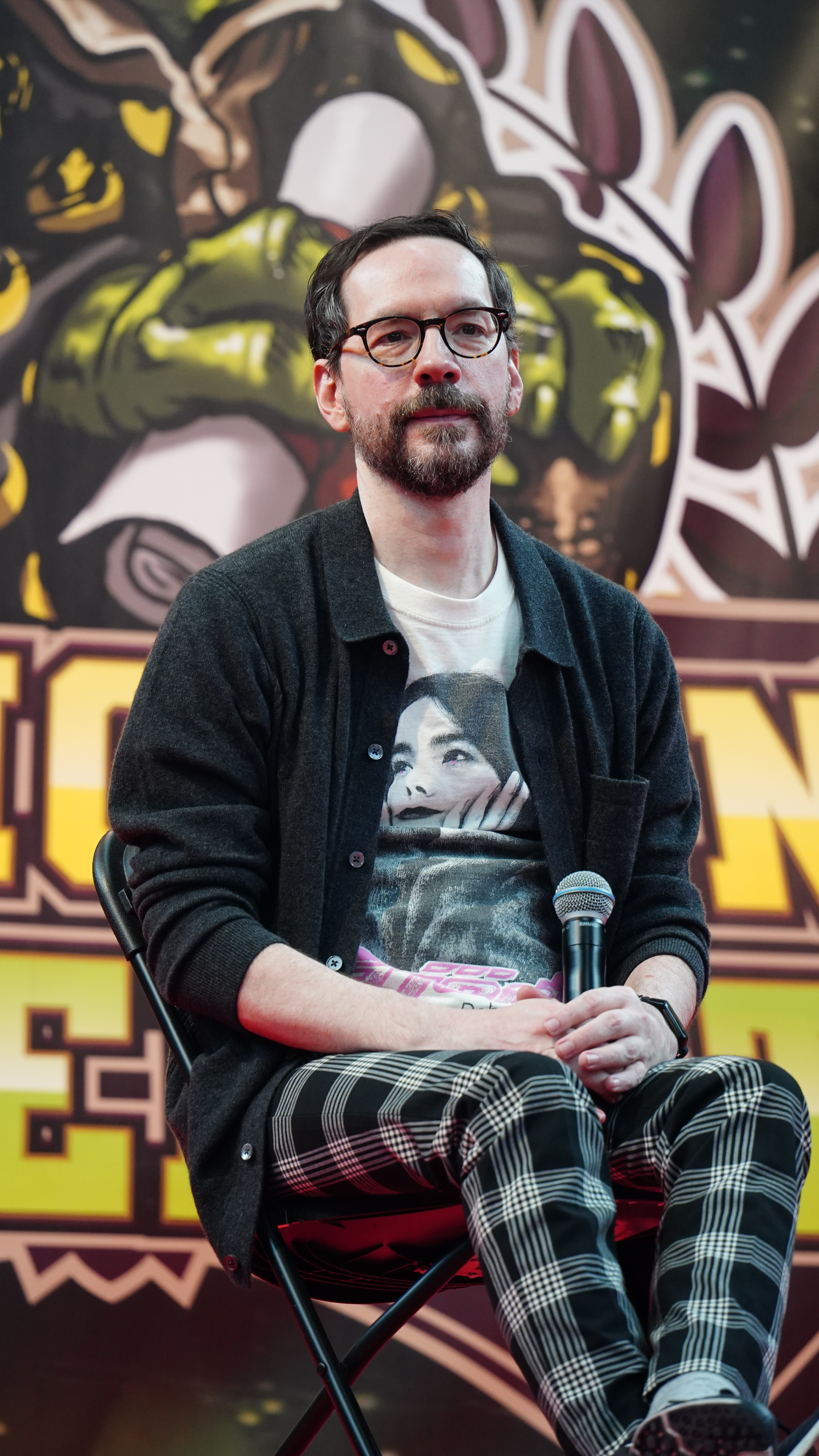
- Havens in 2026
- Occupation: Actor
- Years active: 2004–present

Randy Havens is an American actor. He is best known for his recurring role as science teacher Scott Clarke in the Netflix science fiction series Stranger Things.

== Career ==
Havens has worked as a film and television actor since 2004, mostly appearing in supporting and guest roles across a range of productions.

=== Stranger Things ===
In Stranger Things, Havens portrays Scott Clarke, the science teacher and audiovisual club adviser at Hawkins Middle School. The character provides scientific explanations and practical assistance to the series’ main protagonists and appears in multiple seasons of the show. After an absence in season 4, Havens returned as Clarke in the final season.

=== Other work ===
Havens' appearances in notable film productions include playing Michael in Instant Family, Dr. Tim Mancini in the 2019 film Godzilla: King of the Monsters, Till in Guardians of the Galaxy Vol. 3, and "Star-Crossed Man" in The Suicide Squad (2021).

His television work also includes a recurring role as Stan in the AMC series Halt and Catch Fire.

April 2026, Havens signed with Luber Roklin Entertainment for representation.

== Filmography ==
=== Film ===
Year	Title	Role	Notes
2010	Good Intentions	Shirt Shopper	
2014	Let's Be Cops	Dave	credited as Randall P. Havens
2017	Logan Lucky	CMS Cashier Manager	
2017	Geostorm	Trey Grant	Uncredited
2018	The Front Runner	Alan Weinberg	
2018	Boy Erased	Lee's Dad	
2018	Instant Family	Michael	
2019	Godzilla: King of the Monsters	Dr. Tim Mancini	credited as Randall P. Havens
2019	Richard Jewell	Sound Tech	
2021	Fear Street: Part Three - 1666	George Fier	
2021	The Suicide Squad	Star-Crossed Man	
2021	The Eyes of Tammy Faye	Steve Pieters	
2023	Guardians of the Galaxy Vol. 3	Till	
2024	Guacamole Yesterdays	Franklin	
2025	The Electric State	Sentre GPO	Uncredited

=== Television ===
Year(s)	Title	Role	Notes
2014-2015	Halt and Catch Fire	Stan	Recurring: season 1-2
2016-2025	Stranger Things	Scott Clarke	Recurring: season 1-3, 5
2021-2022	Stargirl	Paul Deisinger	Recurring: season 2-3
2025	Grosse Pointe Garden Society	Kenny	
