= Oriental Movie Metropolis =

Film studio in Qingdao, China

Coordinates: 35.90571911031206°N 120.09601714168774°E

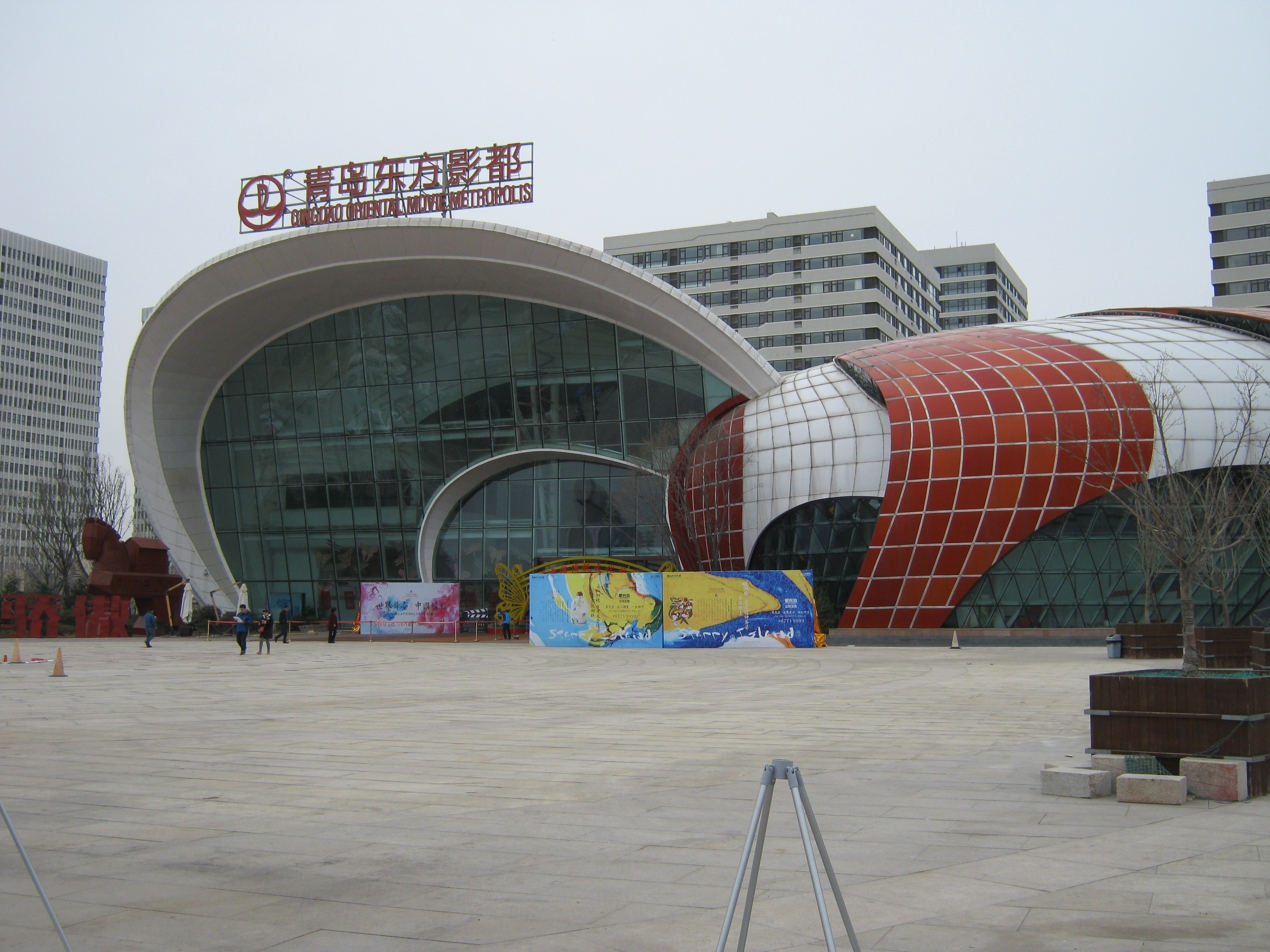

Oriental Movie Metropolis is a major Chinese studio facility, combining film and television production and several other facilities. The Metropolis was funded by Wang Jianlin, one of China's wealthiest men and head of the Dalian Wanda Group, until rising debt forced Wanda to sell ownership of the facility to Sunac, another Chinese real estate developer. The Metropolis is based in Qingdao, China. It is part of a broader redevelopment of a previously undeveloped piece of land 25 km from central Qingdao, and partly funded by the sale of residential apartment buildings also being constructed that benefit from proximity to the studios.

It is described by its owners as the "Movie Metropolis of the East" or "Hollywood of the East", and is the biggest movie production complex in the world, featuring some of the world's largest and most technologically advanced facilities.

Oriental Movie Metropolis officially opened on 28 April 2018.

== Description ==
The studio is planned to be fully operational in August 2018. It will cover 376 hectares (930 acres). The Oriental Movie Metropolis will also be the home to a celebrity wax museum, a film museum, an IMAX research lab, Asia's largest movie theaters, a convention center, shopping mall, resort hotels, indoor theme parks, a marina, international schools, an international hospital, an advanced temperature-controlled underwater stage and the world's largest indoor stage. The Metropolis will have its own international film festival.

The goal of the Oriental Movie Metropolis is to become an industry powerhouse. According to Wang Jianlin, China's film box office revenue will surpass North America's by 2018 and double it by 2023. 130 films are planned for production each year, including 30 foreign movies.

== History ==
In May 2012, the Wanda Group bought the AMC Theatres movie chain for US$2.6 billion., although it gave up majority control in a subsequent sale of shares to Silver Lake Overall, the Wanda Group is investing US$4.9 billion to build the studios and the recreational activities.

A handful of movie stars and executives from the film industry were paid to attend the grand opening of the Metropolis on September 22, 2013, including Leonardo DiCaprio, Nicole Kidman, Christoph Waltz, Kate Beckinsale, Ewan McGregor, John Travolta, Catherine Zeta-Jones, Harvey Weinstein, Rob Friedman, Cheryl Boone Isaacs, Zhang Ziyi, Jet Li, Tony Leung, Donnie Yen, Huang Xiaoming, and Zhao Wei, among others.

On January 11, 2016, Wanda Group announced that it concluded an agreement with shareholders to acquire Legendary Entertainment for US$3.5 billion, making it the largest acquisition of an American media company by a Chinese firm. In October 2016, Legendary announced that filming of Godzilla: King of the Monsters would take place at the Oriental Movie Metropolis facility along with Pacific Rim: Uprising.
