= Tom Woodruff Jr. =

American actor (born 1959)

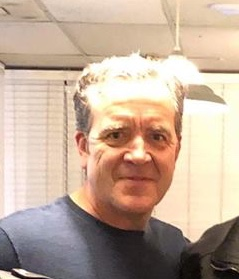
- Woodruff Jr. in 2018
- Born: January 21, 1959 (age 67); Williamsport, Pennsylvania, U.S.
- Education: Lycoming College
- Occupations: Actor; director; producer; special effects supervisor
- Years active: 1984–present
- Spouse: Tami Spitler (m. 1983)
- Children: 3

Tom Woodruff Jr. (born January 21, 1959) is an American actor, director, producer and special effects supervisor. He won an Academy Award for Best Special Effects for his work on the 1992 dark fantasy film Death Becomes Her; that same year he was also nominated for the same award for Alien 3.

Some of his most notable works include: Starship Troopers (1997), Cast Away (2000), It (2017) and Jurassic World: Fallen Kingdom (2018).

== Early life ==
Woodruff was born in Williamsport, Pennsylvania on January 21, 1959. He grew up in nearby Loyalsock Township, Pennsylvania and attended Loyalsock Township High School and graduated in 1977. Upon graduating high school, he enrolled at Lycoming College in Pennsylvania where he earned a dual degree in business administration and theater. Woodruff grew up a fan of films with monsters and creatures and created an interest in doing similar effects, working around the lack of materials in his city – in his own words, the only theatrical makeup supplies to be found was greasepaint at the back of a local pharmacy - such as using art class to create masks based on Planet of the Apes out of plaster bandages.

== Career ==
=== Arrival in Hollywood (1980s) ===
After graduating college, Woodruff moved to Los Angeles with his wife in 1982, pursuing his dream of working with special effects. He worked in a camera store while using his free time to visit studios seeking a job, and after six months he managed to become a make-up artist in the 1983 movie Metalstorm: The Destruction of Jared-Syn. After production wrapped one of his co-workers would bring Woodruff as a make-up assistant in Star Trek III: The Search for Spock, with that film's lead make-up artist Tom Burman bringing Woodruff along to The Adventures of Buckaroo Banzai Across the 8th Dimension. Once Woodruff worked in 1984's The Terminator as an assistant special effects supervisor, he would join Stan Winston Studios, working with the effects crew on the 1986 films The Vindicator and Aliens, in the latter also making his debut on screen playing a Salvager. This would soon be followed by Woodruff playing many creatures in the movie he did effects for, such as Gill-man in the 1987 comedy-action film The Monster Squad, the eponymous demon from Pumpkinhead, and the Alien.

=== Amalgamated Dynamics (1990–2010) ===
In 1988, as Stan Winston prepared to direct A Gnome Named Gnorm and scale back on big effects work, Woodruff and fellow Stan Winston Studios effects supervisor Alec Gillis left his company and founded effects studio Amalgamated Dynamics in Chatsworth, Los Angeles. The company soon became highly requested in Hollywood, with movies such as Alien 3, Death Becomes Her (both nominated for the Academy Award for Best Visual Effects, won by the latter), Demolition Man, Wolf and Starship Troopers. To date the company has worked on over 150 film and television projects, growing in size and scope, starting from just the duo working in three to four movies at once to a team of 95 people in 2004's Alien vs. Predator. In the 2010s, Woodruff has continued to do practical effects in films such as Grown Ups 2, Ender's Game, Paul Blart: Mall Cop 2, Harbinger Down, Unnatural, It, Jurassic World: Fallen Kingdom and Godzilla: King of the Monsters.

In 1993 his alma mater Lycoming College awarded Woodruff the Dr. James E. Douthat Outstanding Achievement Award for alumni.

In early 2017 Woodruff and his company Amalgamated Dynamics announced they would be creating and designing the cosmetics for Pennywise in the Andy Muschietti directed horror film It. In addition to Pennywise Woodruff and business partner Alec Gillis designed and built the dead bodies for the corridors for the film. Woodruff in particular designed and made the teeth for Pennywise with a great deal of comfort needed for actor Bill Skarsgård portraying Pennywise to be able to speak clearly and smile in a way needed for the film. His contributions in this area were recognized by Muschietti after the film's release when he said "... without all the hard work from Tom, Alec and all the guys Pennywise wouldn't have had such a big impact on the audience that it did.

Woodruff and his team received praise for their work on It. They were nominated for Best Makeup by Hawaii Film Critics Society and again at the 44th Saturn Awards.

Woodruff and Amalgamated Dynamics were the designers and builders of the life like dinosaurs in Jurassic World: Fallen Kingdom.

=== Recent and future projects (2019–present) ===
In 2019 Woodruff served as the lead creature character designer for Godzilla: King of the Monsters. Also in 2019 he served as an executive producer for the short film Playtime which was released on March 9, 2019. He played Burke in the horror film The Mortuary Collection. In 2019 it was revealed Woodruff and his company would be used during the filming of Godzilla vs. Kong. The film completed filming in early 2020 and Woodruff was credited as miniature effects supervisor. In late 2019 it was announced Woodruff would serve as the creature designer for the upcoming Guest House film. Director Benjamin L. Brown confirmed Woodruff would have a role in his upcoming horror film Severed Road. Woodruff is also the executive producer in the upcoming science fiction film Wellwood. In 2022, Woodruff worked in both Smile and Prey.

== Personal life ==
In 1983 Woodruff married fellow Loyalsock and Lycoming grad Tami Spitler. The couple have three children named David, Taylor and Connor. In 2013 Woodruff delivered the commencement speech at his alma mater Lycoming College. In 2019 Woodruff and his wife moved back home to Pennsylvania, settling back in their home-town of Loyalsock Township. Woodruff's son, David T. Woodruff, works in special effects and costumed acting like his father today.

== Filmography ==
=== Film ===
Tom Woodruff Jr. filmography
Year	Work	Role					Notes
Year	Work	Actor	Director	Producer	Special effects / Make-up	Visual effects / Animation	Notes
1983	Metalstorm: The Destruction of Jared-Syn				Yes		
1983	Star Trek III: The Search for Spock				Yes		
1983	The Adventures of Buckaroo Banzai Across the 8th Dimension				Yes		
1984	The Terminator				Yes		
1986	Aliens	Yes			Yes		Credited as Salvager
1986	The Vindicator				Yes		
1986	Invaders from Mars					Yes	
1987	The Monster Squad	Yes			Yes		Portrayed Gill-man
1988	Pumpkinhead	Yes					Portrayed Pumpkinhead
1988	Alien Nation				Yes		
1989	Leviathan	Yes			Yes		
1990	Tremors	Yes			Yes		Credited as Grabboid
1992	Alien 3	Yes			Yes		Credited as Lead Alien
1992	Death Becomes Her				Yes		
1993	Demolition Man				Yes		
1994	Wolf				Yes		Animatronic designer: mechanical wolf
1995	Mortal Kombat	Yes			Yes		Credited as Goro
1995	Jumanji	Yes			Yes		
1996	Michael	Yes					
1996	Tremors 2: Aftershocks				Yes		
1997	Alien Resurrection	Yes					
1997	Starship Troopers				Yes		
1998	The X-Files	Yes			Yes		
1999	My Favorite Martian				Yes		
2000	Hollow Man	Yes					
2000	Cast Away				Yes		
2000	Mattress of Solitude	Yes					Short film; portrayed Batman
2000	Bedazzled	Yes					
2001	Evolution	Yes			Yes		
2001	Bubble Boy				Yes		
2001	Tremors 3: Back to Perfection				Yes		
2002	John Q.				Yes		
2002	The Santa Clause 2				Yes		
2003	Looney Tunes: Back in Action	Yes			Yes		
2003	Scary Movie 3				Yes		
2004	Tremors 4: The Legend Begins				Yes		
2004	Alien vs. Predator	Yes			Yes		Credited as Grid and uncredited as Weyland technician
2005	Elektra	Yes			Yes		
2006	Failure to Launch				Yes		
2006	The Santa Clause 3: The Escape Clause				Yes	Yes	
2007	Aliens vs. Predator: Requiem	Yes			Yes		Portrayed Predalien
2007	My Cousins Keeper	Yes	Yes	Yes			
2009	Race to Witch Mountain	Yes					Credited as Siphon
2009	Cirque du Freak: The Vampire's Assistant	Yes					Portrayed Wolfman
2009	Old Dogs	Yes					Portrayed Gorilla
2010	Skyline				Yes		
2011	The Thing					Yes	
2011	Zookeeper	Yes			Yes		
2012	Astronaut: The Last Push	Yes					
2012	Beautiful Wave	Yes					Credited as Coach Parks
2013	Percy Jackson: Sea of Monsters					Yes	
2013	Fire City: King of Miseries	Yes	Yes				
2013	Grown Ups 2				Yes		
2013	Ender's Game				Yes		
2015	Paul Blart: Mall Cop 2				Yes		
2015	Harbinger Down			Yes	Yes		
2015	Kids vs Monsters				Yes		
2015	Unnatural				Yes		
2016	Change of Heart			Yes	Yes		
2017	It				Yes		
2018	Jurassic World: Fallen Kingdom				Yes		
2018	Sorry to Bother You	Yes					Credited as Equisapien
2018	The Predator				Yes		
2019	Godzilla: King of the Monsters					Yes	
2019	Playtime			Yes			
2019	The Mortuary Collection	Yes					Credited as Burke
2020	Guest House	Yes			Yes		Portrayed John
2021	Godzilla vs. Kong				Yes		
2022	Prey				Yes		
2022	Smile				Yes		
TBA	Severed Road	Yes					
TBA	Wellwood			Yes			

=== Television ===
Year	Series	Role	Notes
1989	Monsters	Herbert	
1990	Tales from the Crypt	Utility Monster	
1998	Beyond Belief: Fact or Fiction	Kirby the Gorilla	
1999	Chicago Hope	Stevie	
1999	Seven Days	Kiki the Gorilla	
2011	The Tonight Show with Jay Leno	Bernie the Gorilla	
2012	Harry's Law	Gorilla	
2013	Blood and Guts with Scott Ian	Himself	
	Horror Halku	Demon Rufus	
2016	Zoo	Gorilla Suit Performer	
2019	Room 104	Elmer	

== Awards and nominations ==
Year	Ceremony	Category	Film	Result	Notes
1991	Saturn Awards	Best Special Effects	Tremors	Nominated	Nomination shared with: Alec Gillis
1992	Academy Awards	Best Visual Effects	Death Becomes Her	Won	Win shared with: Ken Ralston; Alec Gillis; George Gibbs
1992	Academy Awards	Best Visual Effects	Alien 3	Nominated	Nomination shared with: Richard Edlund; Alec Gillis; George Gibbs
1992	British Academy Film Awards	Best Special Effects	Death Becomes Her	Won	Win shared with: Ken Ralston; Alec Gillis; George Gibbs
1992	British Academy Film Awards	Best Special Effects	Alien 3	Nominated	Nomination shared with: Richard Edlund; Alec Gillis; George Gibbs
1993	Awards Circuit Community	Best Special Effects	Death Becomes Her	Won	Win shared with: Ken Ralston; Alec Gillis; George Gibbs
1993	Awards Circuit Community	Best Special Effects	Alien 3	Nominated	Nomination shared with: Richard Edlund; Alec Gillis; George Gibbs
1993	Saturn Awards	Best Special Effects	Death Becomes Her	Won	Win shared with: Ken Ralston; Alec Gillis; George Gibbs
1993	Saturn Awards	Best Special Effects	Alien 3	Nominated	Nomination shared with: Richard Edlund; Alec Gillis; George Gibbs
1995	Saturn Awards	Best Make-Up	The Santa Clause	Nominated	Nomination shared with: Alec Gillis
1998	Saturn Awards	Best Special Effects	Starship Troopers	Won	Win shared with: Phil Tippett; Scott E. Anderson; Alec Gillis; John Richardson
1998	Saturn Awards	Best Special Effects	Alien Resurrection	Nominated	Nomination shared with: Erik Henry; Alec Gillis
1999	Saturn Awards	Best Make-Up	The X-Files	Nominated	Nomination shared with: Alec Gillis; Michael Mill; Greg Nelson
2001	Saturn Awards		The 6th Day	Nominated	Nomination shared with: Jeff Dawn; Alec Gillis; Charles Porlier
2012	Rondo Hatton Awards	Best Short Film	Joe Comes to Life	Nominated	—
2012	Saturn Awards	Best Make-Up	The Thing	Nominated	Nomination shared with: Alec Gillis
2017	Fangoria Chainsaw Awards	Best Makeup & SFX	The Monster	Won	Win shared with: Alec Gillis
2018	Hawaii Film Critics Society	Best Makeup	It	Nominated	Nomination shared with: Alec Gillis
2018	44th Saturn Awards	Best Makeup	It	Nominated	Nomination shared with: Alec Gillis
2023	Fangoria Chainsaw Awards	Best Creature FX	Prey	Won	Nomination shared with: Alec Gillis

== See also ==
- List of People from Lycoming County, Pennsylvania
