= Amalgamated Dynamics =

American visual effects company

Amalgamated Dynamics, Inc.
- Founded: 1988; 38 years ago
- Founders: Tom Woodruff Jr.; Alec Gillis
- Website: studioadi.com

Amalgamated Dynamics, Inc. (ADI) is an American visual effects company specializing in animatronics and prosthetic make-up, headquartered in Chatsworth, California. It was founded in 1988 by Stan Winston alumni Tom Woodruff Jr. and Alec Gillis, who hails from Phoenix, Arizona. Notable work includes Death Becomes Her, for which they won an Academy Award for Best Visual Effects, Starship Troopers, which was also nominated for an Academy Award, and the practical creature effects seen in the Alien franchise from Alien 3 onward. Woodruff also portrays creatures in the films ADI works on, such as the Alien.

In 2013, Amalgamated Dynamics successfully ran a Kickstarter campaign to fund their independent horror film titled Harbinger Down, which was directed by Gillis and produced by Woodruff Jr. The film was released in August 2015 and features exclusively practical creature effects. The impetus for the project began when ADI were frustrated that their practical effects for the 2011 prequel The Thing, which were modelled carefully on those in the original 1982 film, were replaced with computer-generated imagery by order of the studio. During 2022 it was revealed through social media that Alec Gillis and Tom Woodruff Jr. would part ways with Alec establishing Studio Gillis and the two pursuing separate endeavours. Gillis would also establish sister company Pro Machina, Inc. which specialises in the creation of miniature effects.

== Filmography ==
=== As Amalgamated Dynamics ===
==== 1980s ====
- Teen Witch (1989)

==== 1990s ====
- Tremors (1990)
- The Grifters (1990)
- Point Break (1991)
- Alien 3 (1992)
- Death Becomes Her (1992)
- Demolition Man (1993)
- Wolf (1994) – animatronic designers: mechanical wolf
- The Santa Clause (1994)
- Mortal Kombat (1995)
- Jumanji (1995)
- Tremors 2: Aftershocks (1996)
- Mars Attacks! (1996)
- Michael (1996)
- Alien Resurrection (1997)
- Starship Troopers (1997)
- The X-Files (1998)
- My Favorite Martian (1999)
- The Astronaut's Wife (1999)
- Bats (1999)

==== 2000s ====
- Nutty Professor II: The Klumps (2000)
- Hollow Man (2000)
- Bedazzled (2000)
- The 6th Day (2000)
- Cast Away (2000)
- Evolution (2001)
- Bubble Boy (2001)
- Tremors 3: Back to Perfection (2001)
- John Q (2002)
- Panic Room (2002)
- Spider-Man (2002)
- The Santa Clause 2 (2002)
- Scary Movie 3 (2003)
- Looney Tunes: Back in Action (2003)
- Spider-Man 2 (2004)
- Alien vs. Predator (2004)
- Elektra (2005)
- Stealth (2005)
- Failure to Launch (2006)
- All the King's Men (2006)
- The Santa Clause 3: The Escape Clause (2006)
- Wild Hogs (2007)
- Spider-Man 3 (2007)
- Aliens vs. Predator: Requiem (2007)
- The Incredible Hulk (2008)
- Lonely Street (2009)
- Race to Witch Mountain (2009)
- Dragonball: Evolution (2009)
- X-Men Origins: Wolverine (2009)
- G-Force (2009)
- Cirque du Freak: The Vampire's Assistant (2009)
- Old Dogs (2009)

==== 2010s ====
- Skyline (2010)
- Beastly (2011)
- X-Men: First Class (2011)
- Zookeeper (2011)
- The Thing (2011)
- Beautiful Wave (2012)
- Odd Thomas (2013)
- Grown Ups 2 (2013)
- Percy Jackson: Sea of Monsters (2013)
- Ender's Game (2013)
- Godzilla (2014)
- Kids vs Monsters (2015)
- Maze Runner: The Scorch Trials (2015)
- Harbinger Down (2015)
- Fire City: End of Days (2015)
- Rakka (2017)
- It (2017)
- Jurassic World: Fallen Kingdom (2018)
- Sorry to Bother You (2018)
- The Predator (2018)
- Godzilla: King of the Monsters (2019)

==== 2020s ====
- Guest House (2020)
- Godzilla vs. Kong (2021)
- Prey (2022)
- Smile (2022)
- No One Will Save You (2023)

=== As Studio Gillis ===
==== 2020s ====
- I'm a Virgo (2024)
- Alien: Romulus (2024)
- Smile 2 (2024)
- Werewolves (2024)
- Predator: Killer of Killers (2025)
- Predator: Badlands (2025)
